= Islington (disambiguation) =

Islington is a district in London.

Islington may also refer to:

== Places ==
=== United Kingdom ===
- Related to the district of London:
  - London Borough of Islington, the local authority containing the district
  - Metropolitan Borough of Islington, the historical former authority
  - Islington East (UK Parliament constituency), 1885–1974
  - Islington North (UK Parliament constituency), 1885–present
  - Islington South (UK Parliament constituency), 1885–1950
  - Islington South West (UK Parliament constituency), 1950–1974
  - Islington South and Finsbury (UK Parliament constituency), 1974–present
  - Islington West (UK Parliament constituency), 1885–1950
  - Islington (electoral division), Greater London Council
  - Islington East (London County Council constituency), 1889–1965
  - Islington North (London County Council constituency), 1889–1965
  - Islington South West (London County Council constituency), 1949–1965
  - Islington West (London County Council constituency), 1889–1949
  - The Islington, a live music venue
- Islington, a village in Tilney St Lawrence, Norfolk
- Islington, a district in Liverpool City Centre
- Islington Mill, a mill building in Salford

=== Australia ===
- Islington, New South Wales, a suburb of Newcastle, New South Wales
- Islington, South Australia, now Dudley Park, a suburb of Adelaide

=== Canada ===
- Islington-City Centre West, a central business district in Toronto
- Islington Avenue, a major street in Toronto
- Islington station (Toronto), a Toronto subway station
- Heart's Delight-Islington, a town in Newfoundland and Labrador

=== United States ===
- Islington, a neighborhood of Westwood, Massachusetts

=== Other places ===
- Islington, Jamaica, a village in the parish of Saint Mary
- Islington, Mpumalanga, a populated place in South Africa
- Islington, New Zealand, a suburb of Christchurch

== People ==
- James Islington, an Australian author

== Other uses ==
- Islington (horse) (foaled 1999), a Thoroughbred racehorse
- Islington College, Kathmandu, Nepal
- The Angel Islington, a character in the fantasy series Neverwhere

== See also ==
- Islington Station (disambiguation)
- New Islington, Manchester
- Ilsington, a village in Devon, England
- Ingliston, an area in Edinburgh, Scotland
