= List of Vanity Fair (British magazine) caricatures (1900–1904) =

<< List of Vanity Fair caricatures (1895–1899) >> List of Vanity Fair caricatures (1905–1909)

Publication date	Subject	Caption	Caricaturist	Notes	Pic.
4 Jan 1900	Maharaja Rajinder Singh	Patiala	MR	P 21	
11 Jan 1900	Arthur Yates	Arthur	Cloister	M 0770	
10 Jan 1900	Gen. Sir Redvers Buller	Redrag	Spy	M 0771	
25 Jan 1900	Col. Audley Dallas Neeld	Composite Regiment	Cloister	M 0772	
2 Feb 1900	Sir Edward Sassoon, 2nd Baronet	Hythe	Spy	S 717	
8 Feb 1900	Denison Faber	ex Opera	STUFF	M 0773	
15 Feb 1900	Sir Thomas Pyne CSI	Afghan engineering	Spy	M 0774	
22 Jan 1900	James Forbes	LCDR	Spy	M 0775	
1 Mar 1900	James Lowther	Thanet	Spy	S 718	
8 Mar 1900	President Paul Kruger	Oom Paul	Drawl	M 0776	
15 Mar 1900	Charles Cavendish, 3rd Baron Chesham	Imperial Yeomanry	Spy	S 719	
22 Mar 1900	Percy Thornton	Clapham	Spy	S 720	
29 Mar 1900	William Ward	CUBC	Spy	M 0777	
5 Apr 1900	Henry Buckley	Company Law	Spy	J 55	
12 Apr 1900	Dr Nathaniel Edward Yorke-Davies	Dietetics	Spy	M 0778	
19 Apr 1900	Donald Smith, 1st Baron Strathcona and Mount Royal	Canada in London	Spy	S 721	
26 Apr 1900	Richard Cavendish	North Lancashire	Spy	S 722	
30 May 1900	William Fisher MP	Fulham	Spy	S 723	
10 May 1900	Thomas Bucknill	Tommy	Spy	J 56	
17 May 1900	John Hope, 7th Earl of Hopetoun	The Lord Chamberlain	Spy	S 724	
24 May 1900	Hubert de Burgh-Canning, 2nd Marquess of Clanricarde	Old Wares	Spy	S 725	
31 May 1900	Sidney Robert Greville	A Private Secretary	Spy	M 0779	
7 Jun 1900	Albert I, Prince of Monaco	Prince of Monaco	Spy	P 22	
14 Jun 1900	Gen. Sir George Stuart White	Ladysmith	Spy	M 0780	
21 Jun 1900	Frederick Roberts, 1st Earl Roberts	Bobs	Spy	S 726	
28 Jun 1900	Capt. Hedworth Lambton	HMS Powerful	Spy	M 0781	
5 Jul 1900	Gen. Robert Baden-Powell	Mafeking	Drawl	M 0782	
12 Jul 1900	Gen. John French	The Cavalry Division	GDG	M 0783	
19 Jul 1900	Sir Frederick Treves	Freddie	Spy	M 0784	
26 Jul 1900	Otto Madden	Otto Madden	GDG	M 0785	
2 Aug 1900	Arthur de Rothschild	Eros	Spy	M 0786	
9 Aug 1900	Martinus Steyn	ex President Steyn	wag	M 0787	
16 Aug 1900	Albert de Rutzen	A Model Magistrate	Wag	M 0788	
23 Aug 1900	John Reiff	Johnny	Spy	M 0789	
30 Aug 1900	Lester Reiff	Lester	Spy	M 0790	
6 Sep 1900	Sir Arthur Bigge	Her Majesty's private secretary	Spy	M 0791	
13 Sep 1900	Walter Rothschild	The Aylesbury Division	Spy	S 727	
20 Sep 1900	George Wyndham	Dover and War	Spy	S 728	
27 Sep 1900	Winston Churchill	Winston	Spy	M 0792	
4 Oct 1900	John Fletcher Moulton, Baron Moulton	Patents	Spy	M 0793	
11 Oct 1900	Sir John Dillwyn-Llewellyn, 1st Baronet	Swansea	Spy	M 0794	
18 Oct 1900	Hugh Cecil, 1st Baron Quickswood	Greenwich	Spy	S 729	
25 Oct 1900	Tommy Burns-Hartopp	Long Burns	CB	M 0795 Master of the Quorn Hunt	
1 Nov 1900	Richard Webster, 1st Viscount Alverstone	Dick	Spy	J 57	
8 Nov 1900	Adm. Lord Walter Kerr	A Sea Lord	Spy	M 0796	
15 Nov 1900	George Farwell	Powers	FTD	J 58	
22 Nov 1900	Robert Malcolm Kerr	The City of London Court	Spy	J 59	
29 Nov 1900	Lord Roberts and his commanders	A General Group	Spy	WS; Standing are [L-R], Plumer, Hunter, Macdonald, Buller, Baden-Powell, Dundonald, Kitchener, Pole-Carew and Carrington. Seated at right are White and French. Roberts' foot rests on the March 8 print of Kruger; double print	
6 Dec 1900	Justice Gainsford Bruce	Slow and Steady	Spy	J 60	
13 Dec 1900	Col. V. Dawson	Irish Guards	Spy	M 0797	
20 Dec 1900	Robert Gascoyne-Cecil, 3rd Marquess of Salisbury	The Prime Minister	Spy	S 730	
27 Dec 1900	John Earle Welby	A Father of the Belvoir	CB	M 0798	
3 Jan 1901	Maharaja Sayajirao Gaekwad III	The Gaekwar	MR	P 23	
10 Jan 1901	Edward Villiers, 5th Earl of Clarendon MP JP	The Lord Chamberlain	Spy	S 730	
17 Jan 1901	Adm. Sir Algernon Heneage	Pompo	Spy	M 0799	
24 Jan 1901	Mr Justice H. H. Cozens-Hardy	Fair, if not beautiful	Spy	J 61	
31 Jan 1901	J. J. Hornby	The Head	Spy	M 0800	
31 Jan 1901	Queen Victoria	Queen Victoria	GUTH	Monochrome reprint of 1897-06-17	
7 Feb 1901	Maj. Henry Mackinnon	CIV	Spy	M 0801	
14 Feb 1901	George Somerset, 3rd Baron Raglan	Under Secretary for War	Spy	S 731	
21 Feb 1901	Gen. Reginald Pole-Carew	Polly	Spy	M 0802	
28 Feb 1901	Arthur Ainger	M’tutor	Spy	M 0803	
7 Mar 1901	Joseph Chamberlain	The Colonies	Spy	S 732	
14 Mar 1901	Archibald Primrose, 5th Earl of Rosebery	Little Bo-Peep	Spy	S 733	
21 Mar 1901	William Baker	MTS	wag	M 0804	
28 Mar 1901	John Rigby	A blunt Lord Justice	Spy	J 62	
4 Apr 1901	Albert Yorke, 6th Earl of Hardwicke	Tommy Dodd	Spy	S 734	
11 Apr 1901	Alfred Plowden	Marylebone	wag	M 0805	
18 Apr 1901	Mr Richard Middleton	The Conservative Party	Spy	M 0806	
25 Apr 1901	Vice-Adm. Sir H. H. Rawson	Fresh from the Channel Fleet	Spy	M 0807	
2 May 1901	Gen. Sir Ian Hamilton	Mixed Forces	Spy	M 0808	
9 May 1901	Canon Edward Lyttelton	Haileybury	Spy	M 0809	
16 May 1901	Charles Whitmore	Chelsea	Spy	S 735	
23 May 1901	Arthur Winnington-Ingram	London	Spy	S 736	
30 May 1901	Col. Sir Edward Ward	A Permanent Warrior	Spy	M 0810	
6 Jun 1901	Edward Austen-Leigh	The Flea	Spy	M 0811	
13 Jun 1901	Sir William Anson, 3rd Baronet	All Souls	Spy	S 737	
20 Jun 1901	Edmond Rostand	Cyrano	GUTH	M 0812	
27 Jun 27	Frederick Walker	The High Master of St Paul's School	Spy	M 0813	
4 Jul 1901	Reginald Saumarez de Havilland	Havvy	Spy	M 0814	
11 Jul 1901	Cecil Legard	A Judge	CB	M 0815	
18 Jul 1901	St. John Brodrick	War	Spy	S 738	
27 Jul 1901	Mr Gilbert Jessop	The Croucher	Spy	M 0816	
1 Aug 1901	Surgeon-General James Jameson	Army Medical	Spy	M 0817	
8 Aug 1901	Sir Morris Fitzgerald	Knight of Kerry	Spy	M 0818	
15 Aug 1901	George Ridding	Southwell	Spy	M 0819	
22 Aug 1901	Sir Godfrey Lagden	Basutoland	Spy	M 0820	
29 Aug 1901	Gen. T. Kelly-Kenny	6th Division	Spy	M 0821	
5 Sep 1901	Gen. Neville Lyttelton	4th Division	Spy	M 0822	
12 Sep 1901	Fred Rickaby	Rick	Spy	M 0823	
19 Sep 1901	Sir Thomas Lipton	Shamrock	Spy	M 0824	
26 Sep 1901	Francis Warre-Cornish	The Vice-Provost	Spy	M 0825	
3 Oct 1901	William Palmer, 2nd Earl of Selborne PC	Admiralty	Spy	S 741	
10 Oct 1901	Sir Claude Macdonald	Tokio	Spy	M 0825	
17 Oct 1901	Edward Weatherby	The Match-Book	Spy	M 0826	
24 Oct 1901	Count Leo Tolstoy	War and Peace	SNAPP	M 0827	
31 Oct 1901	Sir Edward Seymour	China	Spy	M 0828	
7 Nov 1901	John Butcher	York City	Spy	M 0829	
14 Nov 1901	Alberto Santos-Dumont	The Deutsch Prize	GEO HUN	M 0829	
21 Nov 1901	Albert Bosanquet	Bosey	Spy	J 63	
28 Nov 1901	Group of fox-hunters, including the 9th Duke of Marlborough and Lady Angela Forbes	Kirby Gate	CB	WS; a meet of the Quorn in Leicestershire; double print	
5 Dec 1901	Gen. H. L. Smith-Dorrien	Doreen	Spy	M 0830	
12 Dec 1901	Henrik Ibsen	The Master Builder	SNAPP	M 0831	
19 Dec 1901	Randall Davidson, Bishop of Winchester	Prelate of the garter	Spy	S 743	
26 Dec 1901	Nripendra Narayan	Cuch Behar		P 24	
2 Jan 1902	Evelyn Baring, 1st Earl of Cromer	The maker of modern 'Egypt'	Spy	S 744	
9 Jan 1902	Maj-Gen. Sir Henry Trotter	Home District	Spy	M 0832	
16 Jan 1902	Hamilton Cuffe, 5th Earl of Desart	Public Prosecutions	Spy	M 0833	
23 Jan 1902	Sir Matthew Joyce	steady-going	Spy	J 64	
30 Jan 1902	Mr John Otho Paget	Otho	CB	M 0834	
6 Feb 1902	John Hamilton-Gordon, 7th Earl of Aberdeen	Aberdeenshire	Spy	S 745	
13 Feb 1902	Mr Justice C. F. Eady	Plausible	Spy	J 65	
20 Feb 1902	Sir John Stone	East Birmingham	Spy	S 746	
27 Feb 1902	Charles Santley	Student and Singer	Spy	M 0835	
6 Mar 1902	John Walton	A Radical lawyer	Spy	S 747	
13 Mar 1902	John MacNeill	South Donegal	Spy	S 748	
20 Mar 1902	Dr Robert Spicer	Rhinology	Spy	M 0836	
27 Mar 1902	Sir Frank Lascelles	Berlin	Spy	M 0837	
3 Apr 1902	Lord Alwyne Compton	North Bedfordshire	Spy	S 749	
10 Apr 1902	Charles Cripps	Vicar General	Spy	S 750	
17 Apr 1902	Richard Seddon	King Dick	How	M 0838	
24 Apr 1902	Viscount Tadasu Hayashi	Japan	Spy	M 0839	
1 May 1902	Sir Felix Semon	Laryngology	Spy	M 0840	
8 May 1902	Douglas Cochrane, 12th Earl of Dundonald	A Cavalry reformer	Spy	S 751	
15 May 1902	Spencer Cavendish, 8th Duke of Devonshire	Education and Defence	Spy	S 752	
22 May 1902	D. L. A. Jephson	The Lobster	Spy	M 0841	
29 May 1902	Adolphus, Duke of Teck	The Duke of Teck	Spy	P 25	
5 Jun 1902	Robert Abel	Bobby	Spy	M 0842	
12 Jun 1902	Prince Charles of Denmark	A Prince of Denmark	Spy	P 26	
19 Jun 1902	King Edward VII	His Majesty the King	Spy	So 25	
26 Jun 1902	Victor Emanuel III	Italia	Lib	So 26	
3 Jul 1902	Adm. Sir Archibald Lucius Douglas	North America and West Indies	Spy	M 0843	
10 Jul 1902	George Charles Bell	Marlborough College	Spy	M 0844	
17 Jul 1902	Maj Prince Francis of Teck	Frank	Spy	P 27	
24 Jul 1902	Sir Joseph Walton	A lawyer on the Bench	Spy	J 66	
31 Jul 1902	Gen C. de Wet	De Wet	EBN	M 0845	
7 Aug 1902	Adm Raymond-Émile Gervais	l'Amiral	GUTH	M 0846	
14 Aug 1902	Alexander Bruce, 6th Lord Balfour of Burleigh	Secretary for Scotland	Spy	S 753	
21 Aug 1902	H. M. Villiers	St Paul's Knightsbridge	Spy	M 0847	
28 Aug 1902	Stanley Jackson	A Flannelled Fighter	Spy	M 0848	
4 Sep 1902	President Theodore Roosevelt	USA	Flagg	M 0849	
11 Sep 1902	Frederick Temple, Archbishop of Canterbury	Just	Spy	S 754	
18 Sep 1902	Gen. Sir Edwin Markham	RMC	Spy	M 0850	
25 Sep 1902	Whitelaw Reid	New York Tribune	Spy	M 0851	
2 Oct 1902	Arthur Diosy	The Japan Society	Spy	M 0852	
9 Oct 1902	Rev Bertram Pollock	Wellington College	Spy	M 0853	
16 Oct 1902	Sir Edmund Barton	Australia	Spy	M 0854	
23 Oct 1902	Sir Joseph Dimsdale, 1st Baronet	The Lord Mayor	Spy	S 755	
30 Oct 1902	Sir William Broadbent	Orthodoxy	Spy	M 0855	
6 Nov 1902	Adm. John Fisher	Jacky	Spy	M 0856	
13 Nov 1902	Gen. Herbert Plumer	Self reliant	Spy	M 0857	
20 Nov 1902	Sir Joseph Wilkinson	GWR	Spy	M 0858	
27 Nov 1902	The Lord Chief Justice and other senior lawyers	Heads of the Law	Spy	WS; Lord Justice Sterling, Mr Justice Barnes, The Master of the Rolls, Lord Justice Cozens-Hardy, Mr Justice Bigham, The Lord Chief Justice, Mr Justice Wright, Lord Justice Romer, Lord Justice Williams and Lord Justice Mathew; double print	
4 Dec 1902	Walter Durnford	Walter D	Spy	M 0859	
11 Dec 1902	William McEwan	McEwan & Co.	Spy	M 0860	
18 Dec 1902	Sir Alexander Stephen	Russian, Persian and Turkish	Spy	M 0861	
25 Dec 1902	Gen. Sir Frederick Forestier-Walker	Shookey	Spy	M 0862	
1 Jan 1903	Col. Douglas Dawson	A Military Secretary	Spy	M 0863	
8 Jan 1903	William Pirrie	Harland and Wolff	Spy	M 0864	
15 Jan 1903	Sir Michael Herbert	Washington	Spy	M 0865	
22 Jan 1903	Adm. Richard Meade, 4th Earl of Clanwilliam	An Admiral of the Fleet	Spy	S 755	
29 Jan 1903	Mozaffar al-Din Shah Qajar	Persia	Spy	So 27	
5 Feb 1903	Sir Edward Grey	A Liberal Imperialist	Spy	S 756	
12 Feb 1903	Ras Makunan	An Abyssinian General	Spy	M 0866; father of Haile Selassie I	
19 Feb 1903	Sir Francis Laking	The King's Physician	Spy	M 0867	
26 Feb 1903	Frederick Ridgeway	Kensington	Spy	M 0868	
5 Mar 1903	Arthur Wellesley, 4th Duke of Wellington	Stratfield Saye	Spy	S 757	
12 Mar 1903	Chang Ta-Jen	China in London	Spy	M 0869	
19 Mar 1903	Sir Charles John Owens	South Western transport	Spy	M 0870	
26 Mar 1903	Rear-Adm. William May MVO	Navy Control	Spy	M 0871	
2 Apr 1903	Capt. Wilfrid Hubert Chapman	CUBC	Spy	M 0872	
9 Apr 1903	Sir William Huggins	Spectroscopic astronomy	Spy	M 0873	
16 Apr 1903	Aubrey Coventry	Orleans	Cloister	M 0874	
23 Apr 1903	Sir Ernest Satow	Peking	Spy	M 0875	
30 Apr 1903	Seymour Berkeley Portman-Dalton	Kempton	Cloister	M 0876	
7 May 1903	Jan Kubelík	Kubelik	Spy	M 0877	
14 May 1903	Baron Adolph Deichmann	Four-in-hand	Spy	M 0878	
21 May 1903	Sir William Crookes	Ubi Crookes ibi lux	Spy	M 0879	
28 May 1903	Henry Montagu Butler	Trinity	Spy	M 0880	
4 Jun 1903	Arthur Benson	Fasti Etonenses	Spy	M 0881	
11 Jun 1903	Sir Edward Clarke	Sir Edward	Spy	M 0882	
18 Jun 1903	Samuel Mure Fergusson	Muir	Spy	M 0883	
25 Jun 1903	FM Sir Henry Norman	Chelsea Hospital	Spy	M 0884	
2 Jul 1903	Hubert Murray Burge	Winchester	Spy	M 0885	
9 Jul 1903	Forrest Fulton	The Recorder	Spy	J 60	
16 Jul 1903	Harold Hilton	Hoylake	Spy	M 0886	
23 Jul 1903	Alexander Shand, 1st Baron Shand	A Scots lawyer	Spy	J 61	
30 Jul 1903	The Charles Chetwynd-Talbot, 20th Earl of Shrewsbury	Cabs	Spy	S 758	
6 Aug 1903	Lionel Palairet	Repton, Oxford and Somerset	Spy	M 0887	
13 Aug 1903	Capt Alfred Hutton	Cold Steel	Jest	M 0888	
20 Aug 1903	George Hirst	Yorkshire	Spy	M 0889	
27 Aug 1903	Col Robert Broadwood	Natal	Spy	M 0890	
3 Sep 1903	Plum Warner	Plum	Spy	M 0891	
10 Sep 1903	Daniel Maher	Danny	Ao	M 0892	
17 Sep 1903	Capt Percy Scott	Gunnery	Spy	M 0893	
24 Sep 1903	Mr E. Marshall-Hall	Southport Division	Spy	S 759	
1 Oct 1903	John Evelyn Watts	JE Watts	Ao	M 0894	
10 Oct 1903	Frants Ernst de Bille	Denmark in England	Spy	M 0895	
15 Oct 1903	Adm. of the Fleet Sir Henry Keppel	94	Ao	M 0896	
22 Oct 1903	Sir Edward Letchworth	The Grand Secretary	Spy	M 0897	
29 Oct 1903	Mr A Carnegie	Free Libraries	Spy	M 0898	
11 Oct 1903	Sir Sir Robert Rodney Wilmot, 6th Baronet	Berks and Bucks	Ao	M 0899	
12 Nov 1903	Prince Emanuele Filiberto, Duke of Aosta	The Duke of Aosta	Lib	P 28	
19 Nov 1903	Robert McCall	Ulsterman KC	Spy	M 0900	
26 Nov 1903	Sir Sir Alexander Fuller-Acland-Hood 4th Baronet	1st Conservative Whip	Spy	S 760	
3 Dec 1903	Adm. Sir Frederick Bedford	Western Australia	Spy	M 0901	
10 Dec 1903	Pope Pius X	His Holiness Pius X	Lib	So 28	
17 Dec 1903	Sir Frederick Peel	A Railway Commissioner	Spy	M 0902	
24 Dec 1903	Alexander, Count Benckendorff	Russia in England	Spy	M 0903	
31 Dec 1903	Capt. Charles Beatty	Charlie	GDG	M 0904	
7 Jan 1904	E. W. Beckett	Whitby	Spy	S 761	
14 Jan 1904	Sir Alexander Mackenzie	RAM	Spy	M 0905	
21 Jan 1904	Victor Spencer, 1st Viscount Churchill	Conservative Whip	Spy	S 762	
28 Jan 1904	Mr Charles Sydney Goldmann	A self-made African	Spy	M 0906	
4 Feb 1904	Sir Oliver Lodge	Birmingham University	Spy	M 0907	
11 Feb 1904	William Compton, 5th Marquess of Northampton	The lordship of Compton	Spy	S 763	
18 Feb 1904	Rufus Isaacs	Rufus	Spy	M 0908	
25 Feb 1904	Gen. Sir H. A. deV. Maclean	The Kaid	Spy	M 0909	
3 Mar 1904	Henry Northcote, 1st Baron Northcote	The Australia Commonwealth	Spy	S 764	
10 Mar 1904	The William Amherst, 3rd Earl Amherst	The Pro Grand Master	Spy	S 765	
17 Mar 1904	George Lambton	Stanley House	Spy	M 0910	
24 Mar 1904	Edgar Sheppard	a great Marrier	Spy	M 0911	
31 Mar 1904	Hermann Adler	The Chief Rabbi	Spy	M 0912	
7 Apr 1904	Ivo Bligh, 8th Earl of Darnley	Ivo	Spy	S 766	
14 Apr 1904	Sir Frederick Bridge	Westminster Bridge	Spy	M 0913	
21 Apr 1904	Edward Stuart Talbot	Rochester	Spy	M 0914	
28 Apt 1904	Sir Richard Douglas Powell	Chests	Spy	M 0915	
5 May 1904	Charles Lyttelton, 8th Viscount Cobham	Cricket, Railways and Agriculture	Spy	S 767	
12 May 1904	Sir Mortimer Durand	Washington Post	Spy	M 0916	
19 May 1904	Sir Arthur Jelf	Ermined urbanity	Spy	J 62	
26 May 1904	Arthur James	a hard rider	Spy	M 0917	
2 Jun 1904	Horace Avory	slim	Spy	M 0918	
9 Jun 1904	Sir Charles Cayzer	Chief of the 'Clans'	Spy	M 0919	
16 Jun 1904	Bertram Freeman-Mitford, 1st Baron Redesdale	The Nobleman of the Garden	Spy	M 0920	
23 Jun 1904	Stewart Stirling	the Hatter	Spy	M 0921	
30 Jun 1904	Charles Day Rose MP	Newmarket	Spy	M 0922	
7 Jul 1904	John Redmond	the Irish petrel	Spy	S 768	
14 Jul 1904	H. H. Asquith	brains	Spy	S 769	
21 Jul 1904	Count Charles Maximilien de Lalaing	The Belgian Minister	Spy	M 0923	
28 Jul 1904	George Burns, 2nd Baron Inverclyde	A Cunarder	Spy	M 0924	
4 Aug 1904	Samuel Smith MP	Sammy	Spy	M 0925	
11 Aug 1904	C. H. Hemphill	The Irish Serjeant	Spy	M 0926	
18 Aug 1904	Ughtred Kay-Shuttleworth, 1st Baron Shuttleworth	Shuttleworth	Spy	S 770	
25 Aug 1904	S. G. Holland	How Much?	Spy	M 0927	
1 Sep 1904	Laurence Doherty	Thrice Champion	Spy	M 0928	
8 Sep 1904	Maj-Gen. Henry Hutchinson	Patronage	Spy	M 0929	
15 Sep 1904	Bernard Bosanquet	an artful bowler	Spy	M 0930	
22 Sep 1904	Harry Primrose, Lord Dalmeny	In his father's steps	Spy	M 0931	
29 Sep 1904	Herbert Jones	A King's jockey	Ao	M 0932	
6 Oct 1904	Edward Ponsonby, Lord Duncannon	Duncannon	Spy	M 0933	
13 Oct 1904	Lewis Waller	Romantic Drama	jmp	M 0934	
20 Oct 1904	Sir Richard Jebb	Ajax MP	Spy	M 0935	
27 Oct 1904	Maj. John Eustace Jameson	The Major from Clare	Spy	M 0936	
3 Nov 1904	Henry Paulet, 16th Marquess of Winchester	The Premier Marquess	Spy	M 0937	
10 Nov 1904	Aga Khan III	The Aga Khan	Spy	M 0938	
17 Nov 1904	Arthur Pearson	Joe's Stage Manager	Spy	M 0939	
24 Nov 1904	Rev R. J. Campbell	Fearless but Intemperate	Spy	M 0940	
1 Dec 1904	Sir Alfred Scott-Gatty	The Minstrel Boy	Spy	M 0941	
8 Dec 1904	Frederick Smith	head of the greatest publishing house in Christendom	Spy	M 0942	
15 Dec 1904	Sir Hiram Maxim	In the clouds	Spy	M 0943	
22 Dec 1904	Pierre and Marie Curie	Radium	jmp	Pe 1	
29 Dec 1904	Auguste Rodin	He thinks in marble	jmp	M 0944	

Next List of Vanity Fair (British magazine) caricatures (1905-1909)
