= List of Vanity Fair (British magazine) caricatures (1890–1894) =

<< List of Vanity Fair caricatures (1885–1889) >> List of Vanity Fair caricatures (1895–1899)

The following is from a list of caricatures published 1890–1894 by the British magazine Vanity Fair (1868–1914).

Publication date	Subject	Caption	Caricaturist	Notes	Pic.
4 Jan 1890	Sir Myles Fenton	A Railway Knight	Spy	M 0455	
11 Jan 1890	Edward Frederick Smyth Pigott	Examiner of Plays	PAL	M 0456	
18 Jan 1890	Archibald Stuart-Wortley	Sports and Arts	Spy	M 0457	
25 Jan 1890	Stewart Pixley	Bullion	Spy	M 0458	
1 Feb 1890	George Rowland Hill	Rugby Union	Spy	M 0459	
8 Feb 1890	Nathaniel Lindley	Partnership	Spy	J 27	
15 Feb 1890	Oliver Robinson, Earl de Grey	The Best game Shot in England	Spy	M 0460	
22 Feb 1890	Francis Carruthers Gould	FCG	Lib	M 0461	
1 Mar 1890	J. Hare	Mr John Hare	Spy	M 0462	
8 Mar 1890	Sir William Christopher Leng	The Sheffield Daily Telegraph	Spy	M 0463	
15 Mar 1890	Sir William Grantham	Mr Justice Grantham	Spy	J 28	
22 Mar 1890	Stanley Duff Muttlebury	One of the Presidents	Spy	M 0464	
29 Mar 1890	Sir Charles Russell	Cross Examination	QUIZ	S 570	
5 Apr 1890	Bernard John Angle	Jack in the Box	FCG	M 0465	
12 Apr 1890	Philippe, Duke of Orléans	Ier Conscrit de France	GUTH	P 11	
19 Apr 1890	John Jaffray	The Birmingham Daily Post	Spy	M 0466	
26 Apr 1890	Lord Marcus Beresford	Starting	Lib	M 0467	
3 May 1890	Francis Greville, Baron Brooke	He sits for Colchester	Spy	S 571	
10 May 1890	J Sims Reeves	The 'English Tenor'	Spy	M 0468	
17 May 1890	James Weatherby	Mr James Weatherby	Lib	M 0469	
24 May 1890	Prince George	Our Sailor Prince	Spy	P 12	
31 May 1890	Frank Crisp	Mr Frank Crisp	Spy	M 0470	
7 Jun 1890	Andrew Barclay Walker	Sir Andrew Barclay Walker	Lib	M 0471	
14 Jun 1890	James Monro	Metropolitan Police	Spy	M 0472	
21 Jun 1890	James Woodburn	James Woodburn	Spy	M 0473	
28 Jun 1890	Albert Deacon	Tea	Spy	M 0474	
5 Jul 1890	Sir Henry Mitchell	Bradford Goods	Spy	M 0475	
12 Jul 1890	Herbert Beerbohm Tree	Mr Herbert Beerbohm Tree	Spy	M 0476	
19 Jul 1890	Horace Hutchinson	Mr Horace Hutchinson	Spy	M 0477	
26 Jul 1890	Maurice de Hirsch, Baron Hirsch	Baron Hirsch	Lib	M 0478	
2 Aug 1890	Prince Arthur, Duke of Connaught and Strathearn	Our Soldier prince	Spy	P 13	
9 Aug 1890	Sir Charles Edward Pollock	One of the Family	Quiz	J 29	
16 Aug 1890	Arthur Bower Forwood	Mr AB Forwood	Lib	S 572	
23 Aug 1890	Sir Robert Jardine, 1st Baronet	Sir Robert Jardine	Spy	S 573; head of Jardine Matheson	
30 Aug 1890	Henry Lorton Bourke	The Lord Harry	FCG	M 0480	
6 Sep 1890	Sir James Miller, 2nd Baronet	Sir James Miller	Lib	M 0481	
13 Sep 1890	Edward King	a persecuted Bishop	Spy	M 0482	
20 Sep 1890	Reuben David Sassoon	Mr Reuben Sassoon	Spy	M 0483	
27 Sep 1890	Jonathan Hutchinson	Mr Jonathan Hutchinson	Spy	M 0484	
4 Oct 1890	Tom Loates	Tom Loates	Spy	M 0485	
11 Oct 1890	Victor Child Villiers, 7th Earl of Jersey	New South Wales	Spy	S 573	
18 Oct 1890	Marcus Milner	Mr Marcus Henry Milner	Lib	M 0486	
25 Oct 1890	James Vaughan	Bow Street	Spy	M 0487	
1 Nov 1890	Alderman Joseph Savory	A new Lord Mayor	Spy	M 0488	
8 Nov 1890	Hardinge Giffard, 1st Baron Halsbury	From the Old Bailey	Spy	S 574	
15 Nov 1890	Sir ERC Bradford	Scotland Yard	Spy	M 0489	
22 Nov 1890	Joseph Fletcher Green	Shipping	Spy	M 0490	
29 Nov 1890	Prince George, the Duke of Connaught, and others	In Vanity Fair	Various	WS; collage of past prints; double print	
6 Dec 1890	Howard John Kennard	Beggar General to the Metal Trades	Lib	M 0491	
13 Dec 1890	Sir Roland Vaughan Williams	The Mandarin	Quiz	J 30	
20 Dec 1890	William Grenfell	Taplow Court	Spy	M 0492	
27 Dec 1890	Joseph Henry Houldsworth	The new Steward	Spy	M 0493	
3 Jan 1891	Sir Philip Magnus	Technical Education	s.Tel	M 0493	
10 Jan 1891	Christopher Wyndham Wilson	Mr Christopher W Wilson	Spy	M 0494	
17 Jan 1891	Alfred Cock	He has leathern lungs and a voice of brass	STUFF	M 0495	
24 Jan 1891	Gen Sir James Charlemagne Dormer	Madras	BINT	M 0496	
31 Jan 1891	Sir George Grove	G	Spy	M 0497	
7 Feb 1891	Cornelius Marshall Warmington	Directors' liability	STUFF	S 576	
14 Feb 1891	Richard D'Oyly Carte	Royal English Opera	Spy	M 0498	
21 Feb 1891	William Black	Mr William Black	Spy	M 0499	
28 Feb 1891	Prince Henri, Duke of Aumale	The Duc D'Aumale	GUTH	P 14	
7 Mar 1891	Arthur Wing Pinero	Lady Bountiful	Spy	M 0500	
14 Mar 1891	Sir Francis Knollys	Sir Francis Knollys	Spy	M 0501	
21 Mar 1891	Oliver Russell, 2nd Baron Ampthill	OUBC	Spy	M 0502	
28 Mar 1891	Cecil Rhodes	The Cape	Spy	M 0503	
4 Apr 1891	Charles Scotter	London and South Western Railway	Spy	M 0504	
11 Apr 1891	Sir Francis Jeune	Matrimonial Causes	STUFF	J 31	
18 Apr 1891	Charles de Freycinet	French Warfare	GUTH	S 577	
25 Apr 1891	Sir John Bridge	Chief Magistrate	Spy	M 0505	
2 May 1891	Victorien Sardou	Thermidor	GUTH	M 0506	
9 May 1891	Charles Frederick Gill	Gill Brass	Spy	M 0507	
16 May 1891	Capt Francis Pavy	Railway Trusts	Spy	M 0508	
23 May 1891	Thomas Beard	Under Sheriff	Spy	M 0509	
30 May 1891	Sir Edward Fry	Specific Performance	Spy	J 32	
6 Jun 1891	John Blundell Maple	Cheap fares	Spy	S 578	
13 Jun 1891	Squire Bancroft	B	Spy	M 0510	
20 Jun 1891	John Aird	North Paddington	Spy	S 579	
27 Jun 1891	Robert Wright	He declined a knighthood but thought better of it	STUFF	J 33	
4 Jul 1891	Hassan I, Sultan of Morocco	The Emperor of Morocco	Pry	So 18	
11 Jul 1891	Edward Guinness, 1st Baron Iveagh	Guinness Trust	Spy	M 0511	
18 Jun 1891	Rear-Adm Edward Field	The Yellow Admiral	Spy	S 580	
25 Jul 1891	Michael Biddulph	South Herefordshire	Spy	S 581	
1 Aug 1891	H. H. Asquith	East Fife	Spy	S 582	
8 Aug 1891	Jean de Reszke	Polish Tenor	Spy	M 0512	
15 Aug 1891	A. N. Hornby	Monkey	STUFF	M 0513	
22 Aug 1891	Maj-Gen Charles Taylor du Plat	Senior Equerry	Spy	M 0514	
29 Aug 1891	Sir John Stainer MA MusDoc	Oxford Music	Spy	M 0515	
5 Sep 1891	William Maclagan, Archbishop of York	From the Army to the Church	Spy	M 0516	
12 Sep 1891	Jan van Beers	The Modern Wiertz	Spy	M 0517 Jan van Beers the Younger	
19 Sep 1891	Charles Stanhope, 8th Earl of Harrington	Yeoman-like Polo	Lib	S 583	
26 Sep 1891	Harry Foster	A Sheriff	Spy	M 0518	
3 Oct 1891	Col Herbert Eaton	Brown	Spy	M 0519	
10 Oct 1891	Frederic Farrar	Chaplain to the Commons	Spy	M 0520	
17 Oct 1891	Tunkoo Abubeker Bin Ibrahim	Johore	KYO	So 19	
24 Oct 1891	Herbert Mornington Cannon	Morny	Spy	M 0521	
31 Oct 1891	Sir Peter Henry Edlin	London Sessions	Spy	J 34	
7 Nov 1891	Hwfa Williams	Sandown Park	Spy	M 0522	
14 Nov 1891	John Hall Gladstone	Chemistry and Optics	Spy	M 0523	
21 Nov 1891	Gen Sir Michael Biddulph	The Regalia	Spy	M 0524	
28 Nov 1891	Capt Edward Rodney Owen	Roddy	Spy	M 0525	
5 Dec 1891	Group of jurists	Bench and Bar	STUFF	WS; double print	
12 Dec 1891	Sir Robert Romer	Bob	STUFF	J 35	
19 Dec 1891	James Lowther	Foreign Affairs	Spy	S 584	
26 Dec 1891	George Frederic Watts	He paints portraits & ideas	Spy	M 0526	
2 Jan 1892	Edward Temple Gurdon	Rugby Union	STUFF	M 0527	
9 Jan 1892	William Brownlow, 3rd Baron Lurgan	Billy	Spy	S 585	
16 Jan 1892	Edward Linley Sambourne	Sammy	Spy	M 0528	
23 Jan 1892	Sir Cecil Clementi Smith	Straits Settlements	KYO	M 0529	
30 Jan 1892	Edward Hale	Badger	Spy	M 0530	
6 Feb 1892	Charles Willie Mathews	He can marshal evidence	Spy	M 0531	
13 Feb 1892	Canon Alfred Ainger	Temple Reader	Spy	M 0532	
20 Feb 1892	Hamo Thornycroft	Bronze Statuary	Spy	M 0533	
27 Feb 1892	Lord Walter Gordon-Lennox	Treasurer of the Household	Spy	S 586	
5 Mar 1892	John Ball	Mr John Ball jun	Lib	M 0534	
12 Mar 1892	Sir Charles Bowen	Judicial Politeness	Spy	J 36	
19 Mar 1892	Jabez Balfour	Burnley	Spy	S 587	
26 Mar 1892	Hugo Charteris, Lord Elcho	Derby Day	Spy	S 588	
2 Apr 1892	Henry Arthur Jones	Author-Manager	Spy	M 0535	
9 Apr 1892	Robert Brudenell Carter	a Literary Oculist	STUFF	M 0536	
16 Apr 1892	Henry Wiggin	Wiggin!	STUFF	S 589	
23 Apr 1892	Col Vivian Dering Majendie	Explosives	Spy	M 0537	
30 Apr 1892	Sir James Fergusson, 6th Baronet	a Postmaster General	Spy	S 590	
7 May 1892	Humphrey Sturt	East Dorsetshire	Spy	S 591	
14 May 1892	Col Henry Byng	Byngo	STUFF	M 0538	
21 May 1892	Charles Hawtrey	From Eton to the Stage	Spy	M 0539	
28 May 1892	Gainsford Bruce	Holborn	Spy	S 592	
4 Jun 1892	Thomas Hardy	Tess	Spy	M 0540	
11 Jun 1892	Robert Hermon-Hodge	Accrington	Spy	S 593	
18 Jun 1892	George Curzon	Persia and India	Spy	S 594	
25 Jun 1892	Edward Lloyd	English tenor	Lib	M 0541	
2 Jul 1892	Francis Schnadhorst	the Caucus	STUFF	M 0542	
9 Jul 1892	Andrew Stoddart	A big hitter	STUFF	M 0543	
16 Jul 1892	Col William Cornwallis-West	Denbighshire	Spy	S 595	
23 Jul 1892	Philip Albert Muntz	Metal	Spy	S 596	
30 Jul 1892	Charles Wallwyn Radcliffe Cooke	The Constitutional Union	Spy	S 597	
6 Aug 1892	Sammy Woods	Sammy	STUFF	M 0544	
13 Aug 1892	Sir Algernon West	Algy	Spy	M 0545	
20 Aug 1892	Charles Cochrane-Baillie, 2nd Baron Lamington	a Traveller	Spy	S 598	
27 Aug 1892	Sir Frederick Bramwell, 1st Baronet	An Arbitrator	Spy	M 0546	
3 Sep 1892	Clement Jackson MA	Jacky	Spy	M 0547	
10 Sep 1892	Sir Sir Charles Dalrymple, 1st Baronet	Ipswich senior	Spy	S 599	
17 Sep 1892	Charles Adderley, 1st Baron Norton	Colonial Self-Government	Spy	S 600	
24 Sep 1892	Martin Hawke, 7th Baron Hawke	Yorkshire Cricket	Spy	S 601	
1 Oct 1892	Samuel Wilks	Philosophical Pathology	Spy	M 0548	
8 Oct 1892	John Seymour Keay	Prosy facts and figures	Spy	S 602 MP for Elginshire	
15 Oct 1892	John Burns	Battersea	Spy	S 603	
22 Oct 1892	John William Maclure	The Whitehead torpedo	Spy	S 604	
29 Oct 1892	Sir George Findlay	North Western	Spy	M 0549	
5 Nov 1892	Kenneth Howard	Dear Boy	Spy	M 0550	
12 Nov 1892	John Redmond	Elisha	Spy	S 605	
19 Nov 1892	George Denman	He was an ornament on the Bench	STUFF	J 37	
26 Nov 1892	William Ernest Henley	The National Observer	Spy	M 0551	
3 Dec 1892	Mixed Political Wares	Methodical & Methodist / Babble & Bluster / Faithful & Faddist	Spy	WS; Campbell-Bannerman and Fowler (left); Gladstone and Harcourt (centre); Spencer and Ripon (right); triple print	
10 Dec 1892	LRobert Milnes, 2nd Baron Houghton	a young Viceroy	Spy	S 606	
17 Dec 1892	Maj-Gen Paul Methuen, 3rd Baron Methuen	The Home District	Spy	S 607	
24 Dec 1892	Luke Fildes	He painted 'the Doctor'	Spy	M 0552	
31 Dec 1892	Walter Herries Pollock	The Saturday Review	Spy	M 0553	
7 Jan 1893	Herbert Vaughan, Archbishop of Westminster	Westminster	Spy	M 0554	
14 Jan 1893	Sir Richard Collins	Smith's Leading Cases	Quiz	J 38	
21 Jan 1893	Alfonso XIII	A born King		So 20	
28 Jan 1893	Beilby Lawley, 3rd Baron Wenlock	Madras	BINT	S 608	
4 Feb 1893	Jules Quesnay de Beaurepaire	As Procureur Général	GUTH	M 0555	
11 Feb 1893	J. Comyns Carr	An Art Critic	Spy	M 0556	
18 Feb 1893	Sir John Gorell Barnes	Admiralty Jurisdiction	Spy	J 39	
25 Feb 1893	James Bryce	Privy Councillor, Professor and Politician	STUFF	S 609	
4 Mar 1893	Col William Carington	Bill	Spy	M 0557	
11 Mar 1893	Alphonse Daudet	He wrote 'Sapho'	GUTH	M 0558	
18 Mar 1893	William Fletcher	Flea	Spy	M 0559	
25 Mar 1893	Henry Lopes	An Old Fashioned Judge	Quiz	J 40	
1 Apr 1893	James Bellamy, President of St John's College, Oxford	St John's, Oxford	Spy	M 0560	
8 Apr 1893	Herbert Warren, President of Magdalen College, Oxford	Magdalen College, Oxford	Spy	M 0561	
13 Apr 1893	Herbert Cozens-Hardy	North Norfolk	Spy	M 0562	
20 Apr 1893	William Hunter Kendal	Mr WH Kendal	Spy	M 0563	
27 Apr 1893	Algernon St Maur, 14th Duke of Somerset	An old fashioned Duke	Spy	S 610	
4 May 1893	Gerald Strickland, Count of Catena	Count Strickland	Hay	M 0564	
11 May 1893	Harry Robert Graham	West St Pancras	Spy	S 611	
18 May 1893	Sir Frederick Seager Hunt, 1st Baronet	West Marylebone	Spy	S 612	
25 May 1893	Rudolf Virchow	Cellular Pathology	Spy	M 0565	
1 Jun 1893	Sir James Sivewright	Imperialist Afrikander	Spy	M 0566	
8 Jun 1893	Fred Crisp	He Owns 'Chancellor'	Spy	M 0567	
15 Jun 1893	Alpheus Morton	Peterborough	Spy	S 613	
22 Jun 1893	W.S. Penley	Charley's Aunt	Spy	M 0568	
29 Jun 1893	Henry Thring, 1st Baron Thring	He has written on Companies	Spy	S 614	
6 Jul 1893	Princess Victoria Mary of Teck	Victoria Mary of Teck	Leslie Ward	L 12; issued on the occasion of her marriage to the Prince of Wales. Her signature shown in facsimile. One of the few 'Spy cartoons' to bear Ward's real name	
13 Jul 1893	Charles Frederic Hamond	Newcastle-upon-Tyne	Spy	S 615	
20 Jul 1893	Arthur Hepburn Hastie	he is a smart fellow and an honest lawyer	Spy	M 0569	
27 Jul 1893	Sir John Richard Somers Vine	The Imperial Institute	Spy	M 0570	
3 Aug 1893	Benoît-Constant Coquelin	Coquelin Ainé	GUTH	M 0571	
10 Aug 1893	Sir Ralph Payne-Gallwey, 3rd Baronet	Letters to young Shooters	Spy	M 0572	
17 Aug 1893	Walter W. Winans	The Record Revolver Shot	VA	M 0573	
24 Aug 1893	Pietro Mascagni	Cavalleria Rusticana	Lib	M 0574	
31 Aug 1893	Sir John Rigby	Mr Solicitor	STUFF	S 616	
7 Sep 1893	Henry Somerset, 8th Duke of Beaufort	Badminton	Spy	S 617	
14 Sep 1893	Michael Morris, Baron Morris	an Irish lawyer	Spy	S 618	
21 Sep 1893	Arthur Newton	The Marlborough Street Solicitor	Spy	M 0576	
28 Sep 1893	Sir Herbert Maxwell, 7th Baronet	Wigtownshire	Spy	S 619	
5 Oct 1893	Sir William Ellison-Macartney	Fighting Ulster	Spy	S 620	
12 Oct 1893	Thomas Henry Bolton	Buonaparte B	Spy	S 621	
19 Oct 1893	Robert Yerburgh	Chester	Spy	S 622	
26 Oct 1893	William Allan	The Gateshead Giant	Spy	S 623	
2 Nov 1893	Frederick Morgan	Fred	Spy	S 624	
9 Nov 1893	Edward Carson	Dublin University	Lib	S 625	
16 Nov 1893	Harry Levy-Lawson	Cirencester	Spy	S 626	
23 Nov 1893	Sir William Wills, 1st Baronet	Birdseye	Spy	M 0575	
30 Nov 1893	On the Terrace	A Political Spectacle ("The Ayes have it – the Noes have it")	Spy	WS; J Chamberlain, A Chamberlain, Gorst, Temple, Balfour, Harcourt, McCarthy, Mundella; double print	
7 Dec 1893	Sir Lewis Cave	That won't do you know	Spy	J 42	
14 Dec 1893	Sir William Rann Kennedy	Our weakest Judge	Spy	J 43	
21 Dec 1893	John Bligh, 6th Earl of Darnley	Cobham Hall	Spy	S 627	
28 Dec 1893	Pierre Louis Albert Decrais	M Decrais	GUTH	M 0576	
4 Jan 1894	Grand Duke Michael Michailovitch of Russia	Michael Michailovitch	wag	P 15	
11 Jan 1894	Edward Blake	South Longford	Spy	S 628	
18 Jan 1894	Frederick Harrison	L & NWR	Spy	M 0577	
25 Jan 1894	John George Dodson, 1st Baron Monk Bretton	Lord Monk Bretton	Spy	S 629	
1 Feb 1894	Henry Parnell, 3rd Baron Congleton	Lord Congleton	Spy	S 630	
8 Feb 1894	John Cumming Macdona	St Bernards	Spy	S 631	
15 Feb 1894	Harry Cust	The Pall Mall Gazette	Spy	S 632	
22 Feb 1894	George Alexander	Aubrey Tanqueray	Spy	M 0578	
1 Mar 1894	James Rochfort Maguire	West Clare	Spy	S 633	
8 Mar 1894	Alderman William Treloar	Ludgate Hill	Spy	M 0579	
15 Mar 1894	Hugh Benjamin Cotton	Benjie	Spy	M 0580; son of Lord Justice Cotton	
22 Mar 1894	Charles Fogg-Elliot	Fogg	Spy	M 0581	
29 Mar 1894	Edward Stanley, Baron Stanley	Westhoughton	Spy	S 634	
5 Apr 1894	James Edwards Sewell Warden of New College, Oxford	The Shirt	Spy	M 0582	
12 Apr 1894	David Erskine	Sergeant-at-Arms	Spy	M 0583	
19 Apr 1894	C. B. Fry	Oxford Athletics	Spy	M 0584	
26 Apr 1894	Frederick Selous	Big Game	VA	M 0585	
3 May 1894	William Molyneux, 4th Earl of Sefton	The Earl of Sefton	Lib	S 635	
10 May 1894	John Willis Clark	Cambridge Registrary	Spy	M 0586	
17 May 1894	John Burdon-Sanderson	Oxford physiology	Spy	M 0587	
24 May 1894	Robinson Ellis	Latin Literature	Spy	M 0588	
31 May 1894	George Newnes	East Cambridgeshire	Spy	S 636	
7 Jun 1894	Rudyard Kipling	Soldiers Three	Spy	M 0589	
14 Jun 1894	Charles Grey Mott	a Railway Director	Spy	M 0590	
21 Jun 1894	William Montagu Tharp	Chippenham Park	Spy	M 0591	
28 Jun 1894	Thomas F. Bayard	The United States	Spy	M 0592	
5 Jul 1894	Sir Henry Loch	The Cape High Commissioner	Spy	M 0593	
12 Jul 1894	Edward Marjoribanks, 2nd Baron Tweedmouth	A Late Whip	Spy	S 637	
19 Jul 1894	Arthur George Brand	North Cambridgeshire	Spy	S 638	
26 Jul 1894	Sir John Dugdale Astley, 3rd Baronet	The Literary Mate	Spy	M 0594	
2 Aug 1894	Warren De la Rue	Old Warren	Spy	M 0595	
9 Aug 1894	Capt Herbert Naylor-Leyland	Colchester	Spy	S 639	
16 Aug 1894	George Dawson-Damer, 5th Earl of Portarlington	The Dasher	Spy	S 640	
23 Aug 1894	Rudolph Feilding, 9th Earl of Denbigh	HAC	Spy	S 641	
30 Aug 1894	Jean Casimir-Perier	The French Republic	GUTH	M 0596	
6 Sep 1894	Col ARM Lockwood	West Essex	Spy	S 642	
13 Sep 1894	Gavin Campbell, 1st Marquess of Breadalbane	The Queen's Lord Steward	Spy	S 643	
20 Sep 1894	Baron Alphonse James de Rothschild	Alphonse	GUTH	M 0597	
27 Sep 1894	George Jay Gould	Vigilant	Spy	M 0598	
4 Oct 1894	Arnold Keppel, 8th Earl of Albemarle	Arnold	Spy	S 644	
11 Oct 1894	Sir Balthazar Walter Foster	The Ilkeston Division	Spy	S 645	
18 Oct 1894	Schomberg Kerr Mcdonnell	He was Lord Salisbury's Private Secretary	Spy	M 0599; son of the Earl of Antrim	
25 Oct 1894	Charles Gibson Millar	Saide, RYS	Spy	M 0600	
1 Nov 1894	Sir Joseph Barnby	Albert Hall	Spy	M 0601	
8 Nov 1894	Sir George Carlyon Hughes Armstrong, 1st Baronet	The Globe	Spy	M 0602	
15 Nov 1894	Thomas Henry Ismay	White Star	Lib	M 0603	
22 Nov 1894	Francis Paget	The House	Spy	M 0604	
29 Nov 1894	Vice-Adm Sir Edmund Fremantle	on 1 China station	PAT	M 0605	
6 Dec 1894	Members of the RYS during Cowes Week	The RYS (At Cowes)	Spy	WS; Wilhelm II, Lord Dunraven, Rear-Adm Montagu, the Prince of Wales, Lord Ormonde and Lord Lonsdale	
13 Dec 1894	William Luson Thomas	The Graphics	Spy	M 0606	
20 Dec 1894	Clement King Shorter	Three Editors	Spy	M 0607; editor of the Illustrated London News, Album and Pick-Me-Up	
27 Dec 1894	Sir Robert Hart, 1st Baronet	Chinese Customs	jmp	M 0608	

Next List of Vanity Fair (British magazine) caricatures (1895-1899)
