= List of Vanity Fair (British magazine) caricatures (1895–1899) =

<< List of Vanity Fair caricatures (1890–1894) >> List of Vanity Fair caricatures (1900–1904)

| Publication Date | Subject | Caption | Caricaturist | Notes | Pic. |
|---|---|---|---|---|---|
| 3 Jan 1895 | Capt. Lord Charles Beresford | Steam Reserve | Spy | M 0609 | |
| 10 Jan 1895 | Sir Robert Reid | Mr Attorney | Spy | S 646 | |
| 17 Jan 1895 | R. C. Lehmann | Rudy | Spy | M 0610 | |
| 24 Jan 1895 | Sir Arthur Kekewich | A hasty Judge | Spy | J 44 | |
| 31 Jan 1895 | Alphonse, Baron Chordron de Courcel | The French Ambassador | GUTH | M 0611 | |
| 7 Feb 1895 | Lord Frederick Spencer Hamilton | The Pall Mall Magazine | Spy | S 647 | |
| 14 Feb 1895 | Barney Barnato | Barney | Spy | M 0612 | |
| 21 Feb 1895 | Phil May | Phil | Spy | M 0613 | |
| 28 Feb 1895 | Robert Uniacke-Penrose-Fitzgerald | Cambridge Borough | Spy | S 648 | |
| 7 Mar 1895 | Count Paul Metternich | Count Paul Metternich | Spy | M 0614 | |
| 14 Mar 1895 | Robert Haldane-Duncan, 3rd Earl of Camperdown | The Earl of Camperdown | Spy | S 649 | |
| 21 Mar 1895 | Frederick Powell | Oxford Modern History | Spy | M 0615 | |
| 26 Mar 1895 | Charles Murray Pitman | OUBC | Spy | M 0616 | |
| 8 Apr 1895 | Edward Caird | Balliol | Spy | M 0617 | |
| 11 Apr 1895 | Dr Richard Garnett | Printed Books | Spy | M 0618 | |
| 18 Apr 1895 | Félix Faure | The eminently respectable | GUTH | S 650 | |
| 25 Apr 1895 | Vajiravudh, Prince Royal of Siam | A Prince Royal | Spy | P 16 | |
| 2 May 1895 | Johnston Forbes-Robertson | Forbie | Spy | M 0619 | |
| 9 May 1895 | Victor Cavendish | Heir presumptive to a Dukedom | Spy | S 651 | |
| 16 May 1895 | Alfred Harmsworth | He is Conservative candidate for Portsmouth | Spy | M 0620 | |
| 23 May 1895 | Edward Littleton, 3rd Baron Hatherton | Lord Hatherton | STUFF | S 652 | |
| 30 May 1895 | Dr Robert Farquharson | West Aberdeenshire | Spy | S 653 | |
| 6 Jun 1895 | Pierre Loti | Pierre Loti | GUTH | M 0621 | |
| 13 Jun 1895 | August Manns | Crystal Palace | Spy | M 0622 | |
| 20 Jun 1895 | Arthur Wrottesley, 3rd Baron Wrottesley | A Staffordshire Peer | STUFF | S 654 | |
| 27 Jun 1895 | William Beach | West Hampshire | Spy | S 655 | |
| 4 Jul 1895 | Montague Shearman | AAA | wag | M 0623 | |
| 11 Jul 1895 | Sir Henry Hoyle Howorth | a Lancashire Lad | Spy | S 656 | |
| 18 Jul 1895 | Dean Samuel Hole of Rochester | Roses | FTD | M 0624 | |
| 25 Jul 1895 | Alfred James Bethell | Go, Gas & Gold | Spy | M 0625 | |
| 1 Aug 1895 | Boson de Talleyrand-Périgord, Prince of Sagan | Le Prince du Chic | GUTH | P 17 | |
| 8 Aug 1895 | Samuel Whitbread | Parliamentary Procedure | Spy | M 0626 | |
| 15 Aug 1895 | James Thompson | Caledonian Railway | Spy | M 0627 | |
| 22 Aug 1895 | Tom Simpson Jay | J | Spy | M 0628 | |
| 29 Aug 1895 | Eduard Strauss | Eduard Strauss | EBN | M 0629 | |
| 5 Sep 1895 | John Loraine Baldwin | I Zingari | Spy | M 0630 | |
| 12 Sep 1895 | Albert George Sandeman | The Bank of England | Spy | M 0631 | |
| 19 Sep 1895 | Seymour John Fortescue | An Equerry in Waiting | Spy | M 0632 | |
| 26 Sep 1895 | Lewis Harcourt | Lulu | Spy | S 657 | |
| 3 Oct 1895 | Col. Sir Henry Colville | Odger | Spy | M 0633 | |
| 10 Oct 1895 | William Legge, 6th Earl of Dartmouth | The Earl of Dartmouth | STUFF | S 658 | |
| 17 Oct 1895 | Derek Keppel | Derek | Spy | M 0634 | |
| 24 Oct 1895 | James Mellor Paulton | Harry | Spy | S 659 | |
| 31 Oct 1895 | Edward Macnaghten, Baron Macnaghten | He succeeded Lord Blackburn | Spy | S 660 | |
| 7 Nov 1895 | Albert Frederick Calvert | Westralia | Spy | M 0635 | |
| 14 Nov 1895 | Gen. Jacques Duchesne | Madagascar | GUTH | M 0636 | |
| 21 Nov 1895 | William Alexander | Derry | Spy | M 0637 | |
| 28 Nov 1895 | A group of Masters of Fox Hounds | A Masters' Meet | Spy | WS; Lord Lonsdale, Lord Portman, Lord Willoughby de Broke, Capt Park Yates, and Thomas Garth; double print | |
| 5 Dec 1895 | Harry Kent Paxton | Pakky | Spy | M 0638 | |
| 12 Dec 1895 | Crown Prince Frederick of Denmark | The Crown Prince of Denmark | Spy | P 18 | |
| 19 Dec 1895 | Capt. Frederick Lugard | An earnest African | Spy | M 0639 | |
| 26 Dec 1895 | Anthony Hope | Anthony Hope | Spy | M 0640 | |
| 2 Jan 1896 | Charles Pelham, 4th Earl of Yarborough | Brocklesby | Spy | S 661 | |
| 9 Jan 1896 | Harry McCalmont | Giralda | Spy | S 662 | |
| 16 Jan 1896 | George Montgomerie, 15th Earl of Eglinton | A good sportsman | Spy | S 663 | |
| 23 Jan 1896 | George du Maurier | Trilby | Spy | M 0641 | |
| 30 Jan 1896 | Edmund Byrne | Chitty's Leader | Spy | S 664 | |
| 6 Feb 1896 | Charles Vane-Tempest-Stewart, 6th Marquess of Londonderry | The London School Board | FTD | S 665 | |
| 13 Feb 1896 | Richard Haldane | A Hegelian Politician | Spy | S 666 | |
| 20 Feb 1896 | Alfred Austin | the Laureate | Spy | M 0642 | |
| 27 Feb 1896 | Capt. O. H. Ames | Ossie | Spy | M 0643 | |
| 5 Mar 1896 | Arthur Bourchier | AB | Spy | M 0644 | |
| 12 Mar 1896 | Justice James Charles Mathew | Commercial Court | Spy | J 45 | |
| 19 Mar 1896 | W. E. Crum | Crumbo | Spy | M 0645 | |
| 26 Mar 1896 | W. Fitzherbert | Fitz | Spy | M 0646; President, Cambridge University Athletic Club | |
| 1 Apr 1896 | Maj. F. C. Rasch | South-East Essex | Spy | S 667 | |
| 9 April 1896 | L. S. Jameson | Dr Jim | Spy | M 0647 | |
| 15 Apr 1896 | Col. Laurence Oliphant | Bully | Spy | M 0648 | |
| 23 Apr 1896 | Thomas Thynne, 5th Marquess of Bath | Frome | Spy | S 668 | |
| 30 Apr 1896 | Augustus Helder | Whitehaven | Spy | S 669; his portrait also sketched in corner | |
| 7 May 1896 | Sir Francis Evans | Union Steamship | Spy | S 670 | |
| 14 May 1896 | Arthur Richard Jelf QC | Oxford Circuit | Spy | M 0649 | |
| 21 May 1896 | Andrew Barclay Walker | Ailsa | WE Miller | M 0650 | |
| 28 May 1896 | Robert William Hanbury | A Financial Secretary | Spy | S 671 | |
| 4 Jun 1896 | Richard Curzon, Viscount Curzon | South Bucks | Spy | S 672 | |
| 11 Jun 1896 | Group of lady cyclists | Cycling in Hyde Park | Hal Hurst | SS; double print | |
| 18 Jun 1896 | Gilbert Sackville, 8th Earl De La Warr | Bexhill and Dunlop | Spy | S 673 | |
| 25 Jun 1896 | Sir Alfred Wills | Benevolence on the Bench | Spy | J 46 | |
| 2 Jul 1896 | Hall Caine | The Manxman | JBP | M 0651 | |
| 9 Jul 1896 | Capt. Walter Edgeworth-Johnstone | Hard Hitter | Spy | M 0652 | |
| 16 Jul 1896 | R. A. H. Mitchell | Mike | Spy | M 0653 | |
| 23 Jul 1896 | Sir Lewis McIver | the Member for Scotland | Spy | S 674 | |
| 30 Jul 1896 | Frederick Inderwick | Divorce Court | Spy | M 0654 | |
| 6 Aug 1896 | Ailwyn Fellowes | North Huntingdonshire | Spy | S 675 | |
| 13 Aug 1896 | Li Hung Chang | Li | GUTH | M 0655 | |
| 20 Aug 1896 | Charles Gordon-Lennox, Earl of March | Goodwood | Spy | M 0656 | |
| 27 August 1896 | Arthur Guest | A South Western Director | Spy | M 0657 | |
| 3 Sept 1895 | Col. George Malcolm Fox | Swordsmanship | Spy | M 0658 | |
| 10 Sept 1896 | Herbrand Russell, 11th Duke of Bedford | Rousseau | Spy | S 676 | |
| 17 Sept 1896 | William Gully | Mr Speaker | Spy | S 677 | |
| 24 Sept 1896 | George Meredith | Our first novelist | Max | M 0659 | |
| 1 Oct 1896 | Sir William MacCormac | Gun shot wounds | Spy | M 0660 | |
| 8 Oct 1896 | John Douglas-Scott-Montagu | A Southern Scott | Spy | S 678 | |
| 15 Oct 1896 | William Woodall | Hanley | Spy | S 679 | |
| 22 Oct 1896 | Andrew Murray | Lord Advocate | Spy | S 680 | |
| 29 Oct 1896 | Thomas Colleton Garth | A Very Old Master | Spy | M 0661 | |
| 5 Nov 1896 | Sam Loates | Sam Loates | Spy | M 0662 | |
| 12 Nov 1896 | Gabriel Hanotaux | Affaires Etrangeres | GUTH | M 0663; sketch of Cardinal Richelieu in corner | |
| 19 Nov 1896 | C. C. Clarke | The Consol Market | Spy | M 0664 | |
| 26 Nov 1896 | Group of racehorse owners and trainers | On the Heath | Spy | WS; James Jewitt, Richard Marsh, Tom Jennings Sr, John Dawson, Matthew Dawson, Porter, James Ryan; double print | |
| 3 Dec 1896 | Henry Verney, 18th Baron Willoughby de Broke | Warwickshire | Spy | S 681 | |
| 10 Dec 1896 | Gerald Balfour | A Chief Secretary | Spy | S 682 | |
| 17 Dec 1896 | Ernest Terah Hooley | Papworth | Spy | M 0665 | |
| 24 Dec 1896 | Gen. Frederick Marshall | Fred | Spy | M 0666 | |
| 31 Dec 1896 | Col. Sir George Archibald Leach | An agriculturist | FTD | M 0667 | |
| 7 Jan 1897 | Rennell Rodd | Diplomacy and Poetry | Spy | M 0668 | |
| 14 Jan 1897 | Alfred Watson | The Badminton | Spy | M 0669 | |
| 21 Jan 1897 | George Moore | Esther Waters | Sic | M 0670 | |
| 28 Jan 1897 | Sir James Stirling | Equity | Spy | J 47 | |
| 4 Feb 1897 | Max Pemberton | A Puritan's Wife | Spy | M 0671 | |
| 11 Feb 1897 | Sir Vincert Caillard | Ottoman Public Debt | Spy | M 0672 | |
| 18 Feb 1897 | John Lawson Johnston | Dietetics | Spy | M 0673 | |
| 25 Feb 1897 | Israel Zangwill | A Child of the Ghetto | Sic | M 0674 | |
| 4 Mar 1897 | Edward Poynter | PRA | Spy | M 0675 | |
| 11 Mar 1897 | Cyril Maude | Squirrel | Spy | M 0676 | |
| 18 Mar 1897 | Sir John Lawrance | Long Lawrance | Spy | J 48 | |
| 25 Mar 1897 | Capt. Wentworth Johnstone | Wenty | Spy | M 0677 | |
| 1 Apr 1897 | Gilbert Jordan | OUAC | Spy | M 0678 | |
| 6 Apr 1897 | Douglas McLean | Ducker | Spy | M 0679 | |
| 15 Apr 1897 | Sir Alfred Milner | High Commissioner | Spy | M 0680 | |
| 22 Apr 1897 | Mandell Creighton | Ecclesiastical History | FTD | S 683 | |
| 29 Apr 1897 | Lord Kelvin | Natural Philosophy | Spy | S 684 | |
| 6 May 1897 | Charles Tritton | The Norwood Division | Spy | S 685 | |
| 13 May 1897 | Henry Fielding Dickens | His father invented Pickwick | Spy | M 0681 | |
| 20 May 1897 | Capt. Sir Alfred Jephson | The Imperial Institute | Spy | M 0682 | |
| 27 May 1897 | Augustus Legge | Lichfield | STUFF | S 686 | |
| 3 Jun 1897 | Group of lady cyclists, including Princess Brancovan and Duchesse Doudeauville | Au Bois De Boulogne (Aux Chalets du Cycle) | GUTH | SS; double print | |
| 10 Jun 1897 | George Faudel-Phillips | Mansion House | Spy | M 0683 | |
| 17 Jun 1897 | Queen Victoria | A Cimiez (Promenade Matinale) | GUTH | Diamond Jubilee supplement | |
| 24 Jun 1897 | John Hay | USA | Spy | M 0684 | |
| 1 Jul 1897 | Edward Ridley | The New Judge | FTD | J 49 | |
| 8 Jul 1897 | John Gilbert Talbot | Oxford University | Spy | S 687 | |
| 15 Jul 1897 | Charles Darling | Little Darling | Spy | S 688 | |
| 22 Jul 1897 | Maj-Gen Reginald Talbot | Aldershot Cavalry | Spy | M 0685 | |
| 27 Jul 1897 | Menelik II, Emperor of Abyssinia | Abyssinia | Glick | So 21 | |
| 5 Aug 1897 | S. R. Crockett | The Stickit Minister | FR | M 0686 | |
| 12 Aug 1897 | Capt. George Colborne Nugent | A Sub-Editor | Spy | M 0687 | |
| 19 Aug 1897 | Sir Wilfrid Laurier | Canada | Spy | M 0688 | |
| 26 Aug 1897 | K. S. Ranjitsinhji | Ranji | Spy | M 0689 | |
| 2 Sep 1897 | Henry Percy, Baron Warkworth | South Kensington | Spy | S 689 | |
| 9 Sep 1897 | Col. Reginald Wingate | In the Mahdi's Camp | Spy | M 0690 | |
| 16 Sep 1897 | Sir Gordon Sprigg | The Cape | Spy | M 0691 | |
| 23 Sep 1897 | Gerald Lascelles | The New Forest | Spy | M 0692 | |
| 30 Sep 1897 | Prince Henry of Orleans | Prince Henry of Orleans | GUTH | P 19 | |
| 7 Oct 1897 | Sir John Forrest | WA | jmp | M 0693 | |
| 14 Oct 1897 | Henry Anstruther | St Andrew's District | Spy | S 690 | |
| 21 Oct 1897 | Nicholas II | The Little Father | GUTH | So 23 | |
| 28 Oct 1897 | Charles Boyle, Viscount Dungarvan | Sol | Spy | M 0694 | |
| 4 Nov 1897 | Francis Henry Bacon | A Judicial Joker | Spy | J 50 | |
| 11 Nov 1897 | Thomas Merthyr Guest | Blackmore Vale | CG | M 0695 | |
| 18 Nov 1896 | Sir Mancherjee Bhownagree | North East Bethnal Green | Spy | S 691 | |
| 25 Nov 1897 | Of Empire Makers and Breakers | A Scene at the South Africa Committee | STUFF | WS; Webster, Labouchere, Rhodes, Harcourt, and Chamberlain; double print | |
| 2 Dec 1897 | Joseph Hollman | a great Cellist | CG | M 0695 | |
| 9 Dec 1897 | Max Beerbohm | Max | Sic | M 0696 | |
| 16 Dec 1897 | Frederick Jackson | Franz Josef Land | Spy | M 0697 | |
| 23 Dec 1897 | Arthur Robins | The Soldiers' Bishop | Spy | M 0698 | |
| 30 Dec 1897 | Alfred Cooper | Alfred | Spy | M 0699 | |
| 6 Jan 1898 | Evelyn Boscawen, 7th Viscount Falmouth | The star | Spy | M 0700 | |
| 13 Jan 1898 | Count Edward Gleichen | Glick | Spy | M 0701 | |
| 20 Jan 1898 | Algernon Henry Bourke | Algy | Spy | M 0702 | |
| 27 Jan 1898 | Jules Méline | a Premier of France | GUTH | M 0703 | |
| 3 Feb 1898 | John Bigham | We Shall See | Spy | J 51 | |
| 10 Feb 1898 | Luiz de Soveral | Portugal | Spy | M 0704 | |
| 17 Feb 1898 | Arthur Channell | An amiable Judge | Spy | J 52 | |
| 24 Feb 1898 | Count Franz Deym | Austro-Hungary | Spy | M 0705 | |
| 3 Mar 1898 | William Rutherford | Westminster | Spy | M 0706 | |
| 10 Mar 1898 | Ralph Sneyd | Ralph | STUFF | M 0707 | |
| 17 Mar 1898 | John Witt | A Sporting Lawyer | Spy | M 0708 | |
| 24 Mar 1898 | William Orchardson | Artist and RA | Spy | M 0709 | |
| 31 Mar 1898 | Capt. David Longfield Beatty | A hard rider | GAF | M 0710 | |
| 7 Apr 1898 | Dunbar Barton | Mid Armagh | Spy | S 692 | |
| 14 Apr 1898 | W. G. Grace | Cricket | Spy | Reprint of 1877-06-09 | |
| 21 Apr 1898 | William Archibald Spooner | Spooner | Spy | M 0711 | |
| 28 Apr 1898 | Albert Grey, 4th Earl Grey | A Chartered Administrator | Spy | S 693 | |
| 5 May 1898 | Benoît-Constant Coquelin | Coquelin Ainé | GUTH | M 0712 | |
| 12 May 1898 | Ian Malcolm | North West Suffolk | Spy | S 694 | |
| 19 May 1898 | Canon Robert Eyton | a fashionable Canon | FTD | M 0713 | |
| 26 May 1898 | Ferdinand Walsin Esterhazy | Major Ferdinand Esterhazy | GUTH | M 0714 | |
| 2 Jun 1898 | Horace Farquhar, 1st Baron Farquhar | Horace | Spy | S 695 | |
| 9 Jun 1898 | Edmund Stuart, 15th Earl of Moray | a fifteenth Earl | Spy | S 696 | |
| 16 Jun 1898 | Henry Higgins | Grand Opera | Spy | M 0715 | |
| 23 Jun 1898 | William Danckwerts | Danky | Spy | M 0716 | |
| 30 Jun 1898 | Cosmo Bonsor | The Wimbledon Division | Spy | S 697 | |
| 7 Jul 1898 | Sir Walter Hely-Hutchinson | Natal | Spy | M 0717 | |
| 14 Jul 1898 | Sir Henry Burdett | Hospitals | QUIZ | M 0718 | |
| 21 Jul 1898 | Baron Hermann von Eckardstein | A German attaché | Spy | M 0719 | |
| 28 Jul 1898 | Neil Haig | I Say | GAF | M 0720 | |
| 4 Aug 1898 | Henry Deane | Bargrave | Spy | M 0721 | |
| 11 Aug 1898 | John Baring, 2nd Baron Revelstoke | Barings | Spy | S 698 | |
| 18 Aug 1898 | João Arthur Souza Corrêa, Chevalier de Souza Correa | Brazil | Spy | M 0722 | |
| 25 Aug 1898 | Capt. E. G. Wynyard | Hampshire | CG | M 0723 | |
| 1 Sep 1898 | Sir Oswald Mosley, 4th Baronet | John Bull | Spy | M 0724 | |
| 8 Sep 1898 | Gen. Sir William Lockhart | Tirah | Spy | M 0725 | |
| 15 Sep 1898 | Gen. Julian Hall | Julian | Spy | M 0726 | |
| 22 Sep 1898 | Charles Spencer-Churchill, 9th Duke of Marlborough | Blenheim Palace | Spy | S 699 | |
| 29 Sep 1898 | Col Arthur Brookfield | East Sussex | Spy | S 700 | |
| 6 Oct 1898 | Henri Brisson | Justice to Dreyfus | GUTH | M 0727 | |
| 13 Oct 1898 | Maj. Michael Rimington | Descended from Edward Longshanks | GAF | M 0728 | |
| 20 Oct 1898 | Victor Maurel | A fine baritone | Spy | M 0729 | |
| 27 Oct 1898 | Sir Henry Aubrey-Fletcher, 4th Baronet | Mid Sussex | Spy | S 701 | |
| 3 Nov 1898 | Henry Portman, 2nd Viscount Portman | An old Master | Spy | S 702 | |
| 10 Nov 1898 | Sir Thomas Sanderson | Foreign Affairs | Spy | S 703 | |
| 17 Nov 1898 | James Welldon | Calcutta | Spy | M 0730 | |
| 24 Nov 1898 | Sir Walter Phillimore, 2nd Baronet | A judicial Churchman | Spy | J 53 | |
| 1 Dec 1898 | A Committee of Taste | The Lord Protect Us! | Furniss | WS; Balfour, Chamberlain, Harcourt, Lecky and Courtney examine a bust of Cromwell; double print | |
| 8 Dec 1898 | Walpole Greenwell | Walpole | Spy | M 0731 | |
| 11 Dec 1898 | The Pilgrim Resting on His Way | | GAW | | |
| 15 Dec 1898 | Henry Vane, 9th Baron Barnard | Raby Castle | GAF | S 704 | |
| 22 Dec 1898 | James Hannay | Marlborough Street | Spy | M 0732 | |
| 29 Dec 1898 | Edwin Austin Abbey RA | Fairford Abbey | Spy | M 0733 | |
| 5 Jan 1899 | George Monckton-Arundell, 8th Viscount Galway | Serlby | Spy | S 705 | |
| 12 Jan 1899 | Jonathan Backhouse | Jed | GAF | M 0734 | |
| 19 Jan 1899 | Charles Brooke, Rajah of Sarawak | Sarawak | Spy | M 0735 | |
| 26 Jan 1899 | Sir Trevor Lawrence, 2nd Baronet | Horticulture | Spy | M 0736 | |
| 2 Feb 1899 | President William McKinley | An American Protector | Flagg | M 0737 | |
| 9 Feb 1899 | Théophile Delcassé | French Foreign Affairs | GUTH | M 0738 | |
| 16 Feb 1899 | James Hamilton, Marquess of Hamilton | He will be the 3rd Duke | Hadge | M 0739 | |
| 23 Feb 1899 | Lord Kitchener of Khartoum | Khartoum | Spy | S 706 | |
| 2 Mar 1899 | Roland Williams | a Rustic Judge | CGD | J 54 | |
| 9 Mar 1899 | Paul Cambon | French Ambassador | GUTH | M 0740 | |
| 16 Mar 1899 | Henry White | A Diplomatic Cousin | Spy | M 0741 | |
| 23 Mar 1899 | Harcourt Gilbey Gold | Tarka | Spy | M 0742 | |
| 30 Mar 1899 | John Hargreaves | Cattistock | CG | M 0743 | |
| 6 Apr 1899 | William Ward Tailby | A Leicestershire man | GAF | M 0744 | |
| 13 Apr 1899 | John Balfour | JB | Spy | M 0745 | |
| 20 Apr 1899 | Sir Edgar Vincent | Eastern finance | Spy | M 0746 | |
| 27 Apr 1899 | Maj-Gen. Sir Archibald Hunter | our youngest General | Spy | M 0747 | |
| 4 May 1899 | Sir Gilbert Greenall, 1st Baronet | Belvoir | CB | M 0748 | |
| 11 May 1899 | Sir William Vernon Harcourt | A retired Leader | Cloister | S 707 | |
| 18 May 1899 | Émile Loubet | The new French President | GUTH | M 0749 | |
| 25 May 1899 | Tod Sloan | An American Jockey | GDG | M 0750 | |
| 1 Jun 1899 | Prince Victor Napoleon | Victor | GUTH | P 20 | |
| 8 Jun 1899 | Col. Frank Rhodes | Soldier and Correspondent | Spy | M 0751 | |
| 15 Jun 1899 | Col. Sir Rudolf von Slatin | Salatin | Spy | M 0752 | |
| 22 Jun 1899 | David Lindsay, Lord Balcarres MP | Bal | Spy | S 708 | |
| 29 Jun 1899 | Canon James Fleming | Chester Square | Spy | M 0753 | |
| 6 Jul 1899 | Adm. Lord Charles Beresford | The Commercial Traveller | Cloister | S 709 | |
| 13 Jul 1899 | Reginald Ward | Copper | Spy | M 0754 | |
| 20 Jul 1899 | William Lygon, 7th Earl Beauchamp | New South Wales | Spy | S 710 | |
| 27 Jul 1899 | Dr Carl Muck | Wagnerian Opera | wag | M 0755 | |
| 3 Aug 1899 | Austen Chamberlain MP | East Worcestershire | Spy | S 711 | |
| 10 Aug 1899 | Henry Campbell-Bannerman | The Opposition | Spy | S 712 | |
| 17 Aug 1899 | Franklin Lushington | He believes in the Police | Spy | M 0756 | |
| 24 Aug 1899 | Edward Cook | The Daily News | Spy | M 0757 | |
| 31 Aug 1899 | William Jackson | North Leeds | Spy | S 713 | |
| 7 Sep 1899 | Capt. Alfred Dreyfus | at Rennes | JB GUTH | M 0758 | |
| 14 Sep 1899 | Arthur Annesley | Oxford City | Spy | S 714 | |
| 21 Sep 1899 | Joseph Wood | Harrow | GAF | M 0759 | |
| 28 Sep 1899 | Joseph Hodges Choate | United States Embassy | Spy | M 0760 | |
| 5 Oct 1899 | Dr James Stuart | Hoxton Division | STUFF | S 715 | |
| 12 Oct 1899 | Le Comte Jules-Albert de Dion | Automobile | GUTH | M 0761 | |
| 19 Oct 1899 | Gojong of the Korean Empire | Emperor Of Corea | Pry | So 24 | |
| 26 Oct 1899 | Maj. Edward Montagu-Stuart-Wortley | Eddie | Spy | M 0762 | |
| 2 Nov 1899 | Thomas Fowler | Corpus | FTD | M 0763 | |
| 9 Nov 1899 | Lord Edward Cecil | at Mafeking | Spy | M 0764 | |
| 16 Nov 1899 | Capt. George Holford | An Equerry | Spy | M 0765 | |
| 23 Nov 1899 | The trial of Dreyfus | At Rennes | JB GUTH | WS; Col Jouaust, Capt Dreyfus, MM Labori and Demange, Gens Billot, Mercier, Zurlinden, Roget, Gonse and Boisdeffre, Col Picquart, MM Hanotaux and Cavaignac, and others; double print | |
| 30 Nov 1899 | Dr Thomas Stevenson | Medical Jurisprudence | wag | M 0766 | |
| 7 Dec 1899 | Sir Ernest Cassel | Egyptian Finance | Spy | M 0767 | |
| 14 Dec 1899 | John Seymour Lucas RA | A Connoisseur | N | M 0768 | |
| 21 Dec 1899 | John William Strutt, 3rd Baron Rayleigh FRS | Argon | FTD | S 716 | |
| 28 Dec 1899 | Ignacy Paderewski | Easy execution | Spy | M 0769 | |

Next List of Vanity Fair (British magazine) caricatures (1900-1904)
