= List of Vanity Fair (British magazine) caricatures (1885–1889) =

<< List of Vanity Fair caricatures (1880–1884) >> List of Vanity Fair caricatures (1890–1894)

The following is from a list of caricatures published 1885–1889 by the British magazine Vanity Fair (1868–1914).

Publication date	Subject	Caption	Caricaturist	Notes	Pic.
1885-01-03	Henry Wellesley, 3rd Duke of Wellington	the Iron Duke's Grandson	Ape	S 457	
1885-01-10	Anthony Thorold	Rochester	Spy	M 0322	
1885-01-17	Col James Patrick Mahon	Mhagthamma	Spy	S 458	
1885-01-24	Sir Samuel Wilson	a squatter	Spy	M 0323	
1885-01-31	Wilfrid Scawen Blunt	a prophet	Ape	M 0324	
1885-02-07	Sir George Chetwynd, 4th Baronet	racing	Spy	M 0325	
1885-02-14	Sir William Rose	the Clerk to Parliaments	Spy	M 0326	
1885-02-21	Charles Wilson	Hull	Ape	S 459	
1885-02-28	Sir Thomas Colebrooke, 4th Baronet	Lanarkshire	Spy	S 460	
1885-03-07	Sir James Fitzjames Stephen	The Criminal Code	Spy	J 14	
1885-03-14	John Delacour	John	Spy	M 0327	
1885-03-21	Sig Luigi Arditi	Il Bacio	Ape	M 0328	
1885-03-28	Sir Joseph William Chitty	The Umpire	Spy	J 15	
1885-04-04	John Roberts Jr.	The champion Roberts	Spy	M 0329	
1885-04-11	Robert William Edis FSA	Architecture militant	Ape	M 0330	
1885-04-18	Edward Brydges Willyams	Cornwall	Spy	S 461	
1885-04-25	William Edward Baxter	Montrose	Spy	S 462	
1885-05-02	Thomas Hay Sweet Escott	the Fortnightly Review	Ape	M 0331	
1885-05-09	Sir John Eardley-Wilmot, 2nd Baronet	South Warwickshire	Spy	S 463	
1885-05-16	Hassan Fehmy Pasha	The Turkish Alliance	Spy	S 464	
1885-05-23	Justin McCarthy	Irish history	Spy	S 465	
1885-05-30	Maj Augustus George Frederick Jocelyn	The Father of the Rag	Ape	M 0332	
1885-06-06	Benjamin Harrison	the Revised Version of the Bible	Spy	M 0333	
1885-06-13	Sir Edward Robert Sullivan, 5th Baronet	Common-sense in politics	Ape	M 0334	
1885-06-20	Edmond Warre	The head	Spy	M 0335	
1885-06-27	Sir Frederick Milner, 7th Baronet	York	Ape	M 0336	
1885-07-04	Edward Gibson	Dublin University	Spy	S 466	
1885-07-11	William Pery, 3rd Earl of Limerick	a Freemason	Ape	S 467	
1885-07-18	Charles Ellicott	Revision	Spy	S 468; Bishop of Gloucester and Bristol	
1885-07-25	Frederick Gough-Calthorpe, 5th Baron Calthorpe	Fred	Spy	S 469	
1885-08-01	Samuel Allsopp	Burton Beer	Spy	S 470	
1885-08-08	Maj-Gen Sir Peter Lumsden	Afghan frontier	Spy	M 0337	
1885-08-15	Edward Birkbeck	the fisherman's friend	Ape	S 471	
1885-08-22	Richard Corney Grain	Corney Grain	Spy	M 0338	
1885-08-29	Henri Blowitz	The Times	Ape	M 0339; smaller picture of him with back to viewer in bottom corner	
1885-09-05	William Cotton	the City	Spy	S 472	
1885-09-12	Tom Cannon	Tom Cannon	Spy	M 0340	
1885-09-19	Paul Lessar	The Affghan frontier	Ape	M 0341	
1885-09-26	Aretas Akers-Douglas	The Kent Gang	Ape	S 473	
1885-10-03	William Houldsworth	Manchester	Ape	S 474	
1885-10-10	Richard John Lloyd Price of Rhiwlas	pointers	Spy	M 0342	
1885-10-17	John Passmore Edwards	The Echo	Ape	S 475	
1885-10-24	Capt Richard Francis Burton	The Arabian Nights	Ape	M 0343	
1885-10-31	Charles Ritchie	Sugar Bounties	Ape	S 476	
1885-11-07	Sir Robert Harvey, 1st Baronet, of Langley Park	Bucks	Spy	S 477	
1885-11-14	Paolo Tosti	For ever and for ever	Ape	M 0344	
1885-11-21	Tom Nickalls	Tom	PAT	M 0345	
1885-11-28	Dudley Ryder, 3rd Earl of Harrowby	the Sugar of Toryism	Ape	S 478	
1885-11-30	The Paddock at Newmarket	Newmarket 1885	Lib	WS; double print; The Prince of Wales; Caroline Agnes Horsley-Beresford, Dowager Duchess of Montrose ("Mr Manton"); Duchess of Manchester; Duke of Portland; Duke of Hamilton; Marquis of Londonderry; Marquis of Hartington; Earl Spencer; George Manners Astley, 20th Baron Hastings; Sir John Astley, 3rd Baronet; Henry Chaplin; Leopold de Rothschild; William George Craven; Captain James Octavius Machell; Edmund Tattersall; Robert Peck; Mat Dawson; and Fred Archer	
1885-12-05	Baron de Staal	The Russian Ambassador	Ape	S 479	
1885-12-12	Samuel Pope	Jumbo	Spy	M 0346	
1885-12-19	Sir George Arthur, 3rd Baronet	The Mite	Spy	M 0347	
1885-12-26	George Wilkinson	Truro	Spy	S 480	
1886-01-02	Canon Robinson Duckworth	A Court parson	Ape	M 0348	
1886-01-09	Col Edward King-Harman	The King	Spy	S 481	
1886-01-16	Arthur Cairns, 2nd Earl Cairns	the Woolsack	Spy	S 482	
1886-01-23	Frederic Harrison	An Apostle of Positivism	Ape	M 0349	
1886-01-30	Richard William Church	St Paul's	Lib	M 0350	
1886-02-06	Maj-Gen Sir Charles Warren	Bechuanaland	Ape	M 0351	
1886-02-13	Harry Tyrwhitt-Wilson	near the Rose	Spy	M 0352	
1886-02-20	Sir James Taylor Ingham	Bow Street	Spy	M 0353	
1886-02-27	General Lord Mark Ralph George Kerr	Lord Mark	Spy	M 0354	
1886-03-06	Count Costantino Nigra	Italy	Ape	S 483	
1886-03-13	Henry Bodkin Poland	for the Crown	Spy	M 0355	
1886-03-20	Lt-Col Lord Charles John Innes-Ker	Charley	Spy	M 0356; son of the Duke of Roxburghe	
1886-03-27	Sir Edward Thornton	safe Ambassador	Ape	S 484	
1886-04-03	Tim Healy	Tim	Spy	S 485	
1886-04-10	Sir John Kennaway, 3rd Baronet	Devonshire	Spy	S 486	
1886-04-17	Herbert Gardner	amateur theatricals	Spy	S 487	
1886-04-24	Lionel Louis Cohen	the Stock Exchange	Lib	S 488	
1886-05-01	John Balfour	the Lord Advocate	Spy	S 489	
1886-05-08	Edmund Tattersall	Tattersall's	Lib	M 0357	
1886-05-15	Franz Liszt	the Abbé	Spy	M 0358	
1886-05-22	Charles Wood	Charlie Wood	Lib	M 0359	
1886-05-29	Lt-Col John Palmer Brabazon	Bwab	Ape	M 0360	
1886-06-05	Sir Henry Vivian, 1st Baronet	Swansea	Spy	S 490	
1886-06-12	James Selby	Old Times	Ape	M 0361	
1886-06-19	Oliver Wendell Holmes	the Autocrat of the Breakfast Table	Spy	M 0362	
1886-06-26	Joseph Arch	the agricultural labourer	Spy	S 491	
1886-07-03	William George Craven	Billy	Lib	M 0363	
1886-07-10	Hugh Lowther, 5th Earl of Lonsdale	Horses	Spy	S 492	
1886-07-17	Lt-Col William Walrond	Whip	Lib	S 493	
1886-07-24	George Astley, 20th Baron Hastings	Melton	Lib	S 494	
1886-07-31	Lawrence Dundas, 3rd Earl of Zetland	a gentleman	Spy	S 495	
1886-08-07	Maj-Gen Augustus FitzRoy, 7th Duke of Grafton	Charles II	Spy	S 496	
1886-08-14	George Leveson-Gower	My dear George	Spy	M 0364	
1886-08-21	Lord Arthur Hill	Orangeman	Spy	S 497	
1886-08-28	Andrew Fountayne-Wilson-Montagu	The Squire	Spy	M 0365	
1886-09-04	Robert Peck	Robert	Lib	M 0366	
1886-09-11	Charles Stuart-Wortley	Sheffield	Spy	S 498	
1886-09-18	Charles Towry-Law, 3rd Baron Ellenborough	Law	Spy	S 499	
1886-09-25	Sir John Simon	The Serjeant	Spy	S 500	
1886-10-02	Lord Edward Cavendish	a good fellow	Spy	S 501	
1886-10-09	Sir Albert Rollit	municipal corporations	Spy	S 502	
1886-10-16	Walter Long	Wiltshire	Spy	S 503	
1886-10-23	Sir Walter Barttelot, 1st Baronet	one of those	Spy	S 504	
1886-10-30	John Perkins	Downing	Hay	M 0366	
1886-11-06	Samuel Montagu	Whitechapel	Lib	S 505	
1886-11-13	Reginald Hanson, Lord Mayor Of London	The Lord Mayor	Ape	M 0367	
1886-11-20	Edmund Sturge	A Quaker	Spy	M 0368	
1886-11-27	Wilbraham Egerton, 2nd Baron Egerton of Tatton	Tatton	Ape	S 506	
1886-11-30	The Lobby of The House of Commons	The Lobby of The House of Commons	Lib	WS; Chamberlain, Parnell, Gladstone, Spencer-Churchill, Hartington and other members; double print	
1886-12-04	Mathew Dawson	Matt	Lib	M 0369	
1886-12-11	Sidney Herbert	Croydon	Ape	S 507	
1886-12-18	Col Francis Hughes-Hallett	Rochester	Ape	S 508	
1886-12-25	John O'Connor Power	the brains of Obstruction	Spy	M 0371	
1887-01-01	Charles Wilde, 2nd Baron Truro	Universal Knowledge	Ape	S 509	
1887-01-08	Louis Pasteur	Hydrophobia	T	M 0372	
1887-01-15	Gen Sir Sir Donald Stewart, 1st Baronet	Ahmed Khel	Ape	M 0373	
1887-01-22	Francis Egerton, 3rd Earl of Ellesmere	Bridgewater House	Ape	S 510	
1887-01-29	Sir Henry Holland	the Colonies	Ape	S 511	
1887-02-05	Lt-Gen Sir Sam Browne	Sir Sam	Ape	M 0374	
1887-02-12	Sir Charles Parker Butt	divorce	Ape	J 16	
1887-02-19	Hugh Fortescue, Viscount Ebrington	The Devon and Somerset	Ape	S 512; Master of the Devon and Somerset Staghounds	
1887-02-26	Col E. J. Saunderson	Irish loyalty	Ape	S 513	
1887-03-05	John Coleridge, 1st Baron Coleridge	The Lord Chief Justice	Ape	J 17	
1887-03-12	Gen Georges Ernest Boulanger	La Revanche	T	S 514	
1887-03-19	Col Francis Duncan	Finsbury	Ape	S 515	
1887-03-26	Capt John Colomb	The Rule of the Road at Sea	Ape	S 516	
1887-04-02	Lt-Gen Sir Edward Bruce Hamley	English Strategy	Ape	S 517	
1887-04-09	Joseph Leycester Lyne	Father Ignatius	Ape	M 0375	
1887-04-16	Brownlow Cecil, Baron Burghley	North Northamptonshire	Ape	S 518	
1887-04-23	Sir Julian Goldsmid, 3rd Baronet	St Pancras	Ape	S 519	
1887-04-30	William Field	Stay, please	Spy	J 18	
1887-05-07	John Dillon	the Plan of Campaign	Ape	S 520	
1887-05-14	Sir James Corry, 1st Baronet	a temperate Ulster man	Ape	S 521	
1887-05-21	Henry Rider Haggard	She	Spy	M 0376	
1887-05-28	George Pitt-Lewis	Barnstaple	Spy	S 522	
1887-06-04	Sir Henry Meysey-Thompson, 2nd Baronet	Coaching	Ape	M 0377	
1887-06-11	Col John Hargreaves MFH	Mr Hargreaves	Spy	M 0378	
1887-06-18	Gen Sir Frederick Stephenson	dear old Ben	Spy	M 0379	
1887-06-25	John Watts	Johnny Watts	Lib	M 0380	
1887-07-02	Arthur Peel	The Speaker	Spy	S 523	
1887-07-09	Sir Henry Barkly	The Cape of Good Hope	Spy	M 0381	
1887-07-16	James Leigh Joynes	Jimmy	Spy	M 0382; lower Master at Eton	
1887-07-23	Henry Ernest Schlesinger Benzon	The Jubilee Plunger	Spy	M 0383	
1887-07-30	Edward White Benson	The Primate	Spy	S 524	
1887-08-06	Charles Elton	Court Roll	Spy	S 525	
1887-08-13	Henry Manners	Lord Salisbury's Manners	Ape	M 0384	
1887-08-20	Frank Lockwood	York	Spy	S 526	
1887-08-27	Maharajah Sir Pertab Sing	Jodhpore	Spy	M 0385	
1887-09-03	George Barrett	George Barrett	Lib	M 0386	
1887-09-10	Henry Matthews	The Home Secretary	Spy	S 527	
1887-09-17	John Henniker Heaton	International Penny Postage	Spy	S 528	
1887-09-24	Arthur Balfour	the Irish Secretary	Spy	S 529	
1887-10-01	Sir Joseph Pease, 1st Baronet	Peace	Spy	S 530	
1887-10-08	Sir William Robert Grove	galvanic electricity	Spy	J 19	
1887-10-15	Sir Morrell Mackenzie	Disease of the Throat	Ape	M 0387	
1887-10-22	Thomas Sutherland	P&O	Ape	S 531	
1887-10-29	Sir Ford North	gentle manners	Spy	M 0388	
1887-11-05	William Ewart Gladstone	The Grand Old Man	Spy	S 532	
1887-11-12	W. H. Smith	First Lord of the Treasury	Spy	S 533	
1887-11-19	Maj Lord Arthur Somerset	Podge	Spy	M 0388	
1887-11-26	Alderman Polydore de Keyser	the Lord Mayor	Spy	M 0389	
1887-12-03	Capt James Octavius Machell	Jem	Spy	M 0390	
1887-12-06	Newmarket	Tattersall's, 1887	Lib	WS; double print	
1887-12-10	John Osborne	Johnny	Lib	M 0391	
1887-12-17	Edward Heneage	Grimsby	Spy	S 534	
1887-12-24	John Lambton, 3rd Earl of Durham	Coals	Spy	S 535	
1887-12-31	Henry Howard, 18th Earl of Suffolk	Dover	Lib	S 535	
1888-01-07	Sir Edward Ebenezer Kay	costs disallowed	Spy	J 20	
1888-01-14	Lord Alexander Victor Paget	Dandy	Spy	M 0392	
1888-01-21	George Grossmith	The Pinafore	Spy	M 0393	
1888-01-28	Ernest John Heriz Smith	Pembroke	Hay	M 0394	
1888-02-04	Sir Arthur Charles	the new Judge	Spy	M 0395	
1888-02-11	John Gennadius, Greek Minister (el)	Greece	Spy	M 0396	
1888-02-18	Charles Hall	Charley	Spy	S 536	
1888-02-25	T. P. O'Connor	Tay Pay	Spy	S 537	
1888-03-03	Reginald Chandos-Pole	Shandy	Spy	M 0397	
1888-03-10	Daniel Godfrey	Dan Godfrey	Spy	M 0398	
1888-03-17	Harvey Goodwin	Carlisle	Spy	M 0399	
1888-03-24	Thomas Russell	loyal and patriotic	Spy	S 538	
1888-03-31	Edward Pickersgill	Bethnal Green	Spy	S 539	
1888-04-07	George Brudenell-Bruce, 4th Marquess of Ailesbury	the Marquis	Lib	S 540	
1888-04-14	Alan Frederick Cathcart, 3rd Earl Cathcart	He has devoted his life to husbandry and has nine children	Spy	S 541	
1888-04-21	Sir James Hannen	the great unmarrier	Spy	J 21	
1888-04-28	John Francis Holcombe Read	Father Time	Lib	M 0400	
1888-05-05	Wellington Stapleton-Cotton, 2nd Viscount Combermere	Horses	Spy	S 542	
1888-05-12	Sir Edward Bates, 1st Baronet	Plymouth	Spy	S 543	
1888-05-19	Henry Cotton	guileless	Spy	J 22	
1888-05-26	James Brand	telephones	Lib	M 0401	
1888-06-02	Joseph Henry Blackburne	Chess	Ape	M 0402	
1888-06-09	Nathan Mayer Rothschild	Natty	Lib	S 544	
1888-06-16	Charles Floquet	Vive la Pologne	Ape	M 0403	
1888-06-23	John Macdonald	The Lord Advocate	Spy	S 544	
1888-06-30	Walter Gilbey	cart horses	Spy	M 0404	
1888-07-07	Francis Charles Philips	As in a Looking Glass	Ape	M 0405	
1888-07-14	George Herbert, 13th Earl of Pembroke, 10th Earl of Montgomery	The Earl and the Doctor	Ape	S 546	
1888-07-21	Spencer Cavendish, Marquess of Hartington MP	The Right Hon the Marquis of Hartington MP	Spy	S 547	
1888-07-28	Walter Read	WW	Lib	M 0406	
1888-08-04	Charles Kearns Deane Tanner	the blister	Spy	S 548	
1888-08-11	Col Cuthbert Larking	Cuthbert	Ape	M 0407	
1888-08-18	Gen George Upton, 3rd Viscount Templetown	Upty	Ape	M 0408	
1888-08-25	Cunninghame Graham	Trafalgar Square	Spy	S 549	
1888-09-01	William Bromley-Davenport	Macclesfield	Spy	S 550	
1888-09-08	James Payn	The Heir of the Ages	Ape	M 0409	
1888-09-15	Edward Baring, 1st Baron Revelstoke	Barings	Lib	S 551	
1888-09-22	Hugh Reginald Haweis	The Parson, The Play and the Ballet	Ape	M 0410	
1888-09-29	George Granville Bradley	The Dean of Westminster	Spy	M 0411	
1888-10-06	George Alexander Baird	Mr Abington	Lib	M 0412	
1888-10-13	Prince Albert Victor	Eddie	Hay	P 09	
1888-10-20	Frederick Ponsonby, 6th Earl of Bessborough	Fred	Spy	S 552	
1888-10-27	Sir John Charles Day	2nd Commissioner	Spy	J 23	
1888-11-03	Sir Archibald Levin Smith	3rd Commissioner	Spy	J 24	
1888-11-10	George Rodney, 7th Baron Rodney	a pupil	Lib	M 0413	
1888-11-17	Sir Savile Crossley	Lowestoft	Spy	S 553	
1888-11-24	Oscar Browning	OB	Hay	M 0414	
1888-12-01	Jesse Collings MP	3 acres and a cow	Spy	S 554	
1888-12-08	Group of jockeys and their horses	The Winning Post	Lib	WS; John Osborne, Tom Cannon, John Watts, Fred Webb, Fred Barrett, George Barrett, William Robinson and Fred Rickaby; double print	
1888-12-15	Robert Finlay	hard head	Ape	S 555	
1888-12-22	Sir William Bartlett Dalby	the ear	Ape	M 0415	
1888-12-29	George Thomas Kenyon	Denbigh Boroughs	Spy	S 556	
1889-01-05	Lord Randolph Churchill	In a new character	Lib	S 557	
1889-01-12	Henry Wellesley, Viscount Dangan	Viscount Dangan	Spy	S 558	
1889-01-19	Edmund Henry Morgan	Red Morgan	Hay	M 0416	
1889-01-26	Henry Arthur Morgan	Black Morgan	Hay	M 0417	
1889-02-02	Edmund Beckett, 1st Baron Grimthorpe	Bells	Spy	S 559	
1889-02-09	William Quilter	in Society and a Member of Parliament	Lib	S 560	
1889-02-16	Sir William Tindal Robertson	Brighton	Spy	S 561	
1889-02-23	George Osborne, Marquess of Carmarthen	Dolly	Hay	S 562	
1889-03-02	Sir George Russell, 4th Baronet	Wokingham	Spy	S 563	
1889-03-09	Richard Pigott	Richard Pigott	Spy	M 0418	
1889-03-16	James Whitehead	Bonnie Westmoreland	Hay	M 0419; Lord Mayor of London	
1889-03-23	JT Mackenzie of Kintail	the Universal Benefactor	Lib	M 0420	
1889-03-30	Henry Moore, 3rd Marquess of Drogheda	Punchestown	Hay	S 564	
1889-04-06	John Bright	John Bright	Ape	S 565; reprint of 1869-02-13	
1889-04-13	Col George E. Gouraud	Little Menlo	Ape	M 0421	
1889-04-20	George Allsopp	Beer	Lib	S 566	
1889-04-27	Carlo Pellegrini	Ape	AHM	M 0422	
1889-05-04	John Patrick Murphy	for the Times	Spy	M 0423	
1889-05-11	Gustave Eiffel	Gustave Eiffel	GUTH	M 0424	
1889-05-18	Henry Montagu Butler	the Master of Trinity	Hay	M 0425	
1889-05-25	Pablo de Sarasate	Sarasate	Ape	M 0426	
1889-06-01	Fred Barrett	Fred Barrett	Lib	M 0427	
1889-06-08	Harry Marks	Financial News	AHM	M 0428	
1889-06-15	Baron Ferdinand de Rothschild MP	Ferdy	Hay	S 567	
1889-06-22	William Mansfield, 2nd Baron Sandhurst	A Soldier's Son	Spy	S 568	
1889-06-29	Hylton Philipson	Oxford Cricket	Spy	M 0429	
1889-07-06	Prince Demtrey Soltykoff	Prince Soltykoff	Spy	M 0430	
1889-07-13	Thomas Gibson Bowles	Tommy	Spy	M 0431	
1889-07-20	Guy Nickalls	Wingfield Sculls	Spy	M 0432	
1889-07-27	Alexander Duff, 6th Earl Fife	A Princess's Husband	Spy	M 0433	
1889-08-03	Adm Sir John Edmund Commerell	Admiral Sir John Edmund Commerell, VC	Spy	M 0434	
1889-08-10	Fred Webb	Fred Webb	Lib	M 0435	
1889-08-17	Henry Tufton, 1st Baron Hothfield	Lord Hothfield	Spy	M 0436	
1889-08-24	Maj E. H. Egerton	Official Handicapper to the Jockey Club	Lib	M 0437	
1889-08-31	James Coates	Mr James Coates	Spy	M 0438	
1889-09-07	Henry Searle	Professional Champion Sculler of the World	Spy	M 0439	
1889-09-14	John Corlett	The Pink 'Un	Lib	M 0440	
1889-09-21	Sadi Carnot	President of the French Republic	PAL	S 569	
1889-09-28	Augustus Harris	Drury Lane	Spy	M 0441	
1889-10-05	Harry McCalmont	Mr HLB McCalmont	Spy	M 0442	
1889-10-12	J. Porter	Mr John Porter	Lib	M 0443	
1889-10-19	Maj-Gen Sir Francis Grenfell	Major Gen Sir Francis Grenfell KCB	Spy	M 0444	
1889-10-26	Chauncey Depew	President of the New York Central Road	Spy	M 0445	
1889-11-02	Capt John Thomas North	The Nitrate King	Spy	M 0446	
1889-11-09	Sir Henry Aaron Isaacs	A New Lord Mayor	Spy	M 0447	
1889-11-16	P. T. Barnum	Barnum	Spy	M 0448	
1889-11-23	Leslie Ward	Spy	PAL	M 0449	
1889-11-30	Henry Manisty	Mr Justice Manisty	QUIZ	M 0450	
1889-12-07	Henri Blowitz	'The Times' in Paris	GUTH	M 0451	
1889-12-14	Alexander Meyrick Broadley	He defended Arabi	Spy	M 0452	
1889-12-21	Charles Robert Barry	Lord Justice Barry	Lib	M 0453	
1889-12-28	Arthur Cecil	Mr Arthur Cecil	Spy	M 0454	

Next List of Vanity Fair (British magazine) caricatures (1890-1894)
