= Henry Mills (British politician) =

British politician

Henry Mills (1868 – 11 March 1928) was a British politician and anti-Sabbatarianist activist.

In 1888, Mills became the secretary of the National Sunday League, an organisation which opposed Sabbatarianism. Under his leadership, it succeeded in legalising musical concerts on Sundays, and it ran successful excursions to seaside resorts on Sundays. He served for nine years as a Liberal Party alderman on Islington Metropolitan Borough Council, and in 1905/06, he served as Mayor of Islington.

At the 1913 London County Council election, Mills was elected for the Progressive Party in Islington West. He stood as a Liberal Party candidate in the 1922 UK general election in Islington West, taking a close second place with 35.3% of the vote. He retained his council seat until his retirement, in 1928. He died a couple of days after the election.

Civic offices
Preceded by Andrew Mitchell Torrance	Mayor of Islington; 1905–1906	Succeeded by George Elliott
