= Islington West (London County Council constituency) =

London County Council constituency

- Former constituency for the London County Council

Former constituency
- Created: 1889
- Abolished: 1949
- Member(s): 2
- Replaced by: Islington South West

Islington West was a constituency used for elections to the London County Council between 1889 and 1949. The seat shared boundaries with the UK Parliament constituency of the same name.

== Councillors ==
| Year | Name | Party | Name | Party |
|---|---|---|---|---|
| 1889 | Donald Horne Macfarlane | Progressive | Robert Brudenell Carter | Moderate |
| 1892 | William Goodman | Progressive | George Joseph Chatterton | Moderate |
| 1895 | William Goodman | Progressive | George Heynes Radford | Progressive |
| 1907 | Henry James Clarke | Municipal Reform | Isidore Salmon | Municipal Reform |
| 1910 | Richard Cornthwaite Lambert | Progressive | Henry Lorenzo Jephson | Progressive |
| 1913 | Henry Mills | Progressive | Henry Lorenzo Jephson | Progressive |
| 1914 | Henry Mills | Progressive | William Anthony Nicholls | Progressive |
| 1919 | Henry Mills | Progressive | James Skinner | Progressive |
| 1922 | Henry Mills | Progressive | Frank Raffety | Progressive |
| 1925 | Henry Mills | Progressive | Sidney Charles Harper | Municipal Reform |
| 1928 | George Bryant Naish | Labour | Arthur George Prichard | Labour |
| 1946 | George Bryant Naish | Labour | Albert Evans | Labour |

== Election results ==
1889 London County Council election: Islington West
| Party | Candidate | Votes | % | ±% |
|---|---|---|---|---|
| Progressive | Donald Horne Macfarlane | 1,661 | | |
| Moderate | Robert Brudenell Carter | 883 | | |
| Moderate | James Boddely Keene | 854 | | |
| Progressive | James May | 798 | | |
| Moderate | William Goodman | 771 | | |
| Progressive | John Thomas Slater | 506 | | |
| Moderate win (new seat) | | | | |
| Progressive win (new seat) | | | | |

1892 London County Council election: Islington West
| Party | Candidate | Votes | % | ±% |
|---|---|---|---|---|
| Progressive | William Goodman | 1,511 | | |
| Moderate | George Joseph Chatterton | 1,471 | | |
| Moderate | Leonard Darwin | 1,425 | | |
| Progressive | George Heynes Radford | 1,418 | | |
| Independent | James May | 464 | | |
| Independent Labour | James Miller | 411 | | |
| Moderate hold | | Swing | | |
| Progressive hold | | Swing | | |

1895 London County Council election: Islington West
| Party | Candidate | Votes | % | ±% |
|---|---|---|---|---|
| Progressive | William Goodman | 2,287 | | |
| Progressive | George Heynes Radford | 2,211 | | |
| Moderate | George Joseph Chatterton | 1,483 | | |
| Moderate | J. R. Cousens | 1,422 | | |
| Independent Progressive | H. N. Cheesley | 160 | | |
| Social Democratic Federation | C. H. Groombridge | 72 | | |
| Social Democratic Federation | A. Blackwell | 26 | | |
| Progressive gain from Moderate | | Swing | | |
| Progressive hold | | Swing | | |

1898 London County Council election: Islington West
| Party | Candidate | Votes | % | ±% |
|---|---|---|---|---|
| Progressive | William Goodman | 2,456 | | |
| Progressive | George Heynes Radford | 2,361 | | |
| Moderate | George Joseph Chatterton | 1,431 | | |
| Moderate | D. H. Kyd | 1,361 | | |
| Progressive hold | | Swing | | |
| Progressive hold | | Swing | | |

1901 London County Council election: Islington West
| Party | Candidate | Votes | % | ±% |
|---|---|---|---|---|
| Progressive | William Goodman | 3,039 | 34.9 | +2.6 |
| Progressive | George Heynes Radford | 3,014 | 34.6 | +3.6 |
| Conservative | Felix Arthur Davies | 1,351 | 15.5 | −3.3 |
| Conservative | George Alexander Grant | 1,296 | 14.9 | −3.0 |
| Progressive hold | | Swing | | |
| Progressive hold | | Swing | +3.1 | |

1904 London County Council election: Islington West
| Party | Candidate | Votes | % | ±% |
|---|---|---|---|---|
| Progressive | William Goodman | 2,904 | | |
| Progressive | George Heynes Radford | 2,874 | | |
| Conservative | A. J. Adams | 1,705 | | |
| Conservative | Henry James Clarke | 1,695 | | |
| Majority | | | | |
| Municipal Reform gain from Progressive | | Swing | | |
| Municipal Reform gain from Progressive | | Swing | | |

1907 London County Council election: Islington West
| Party | Candidate | Votes | % | ±% |
|---|---|---|---|---|
| Municipal Reform | Henry James Clarke | 3,300 | | |
| Municipal Reform | Isidore Salmon | 3,226 | | |
| Progressive | Richard Cornthwaite Lambert | 2,933 | | |
| Progressive | Anthony John Mundella | 2,900 | | |
| Majority | | | | |
| Municipal Reform gain from Progressive | | Swing | | |
| Municipal Reform gain from Progressive | | Swing | | |

1910 London County Council election: Islington West
| Party | Candidate | Votes | % | ±% |
|---|---|---|---|---|
| Progressive | Richard Cornthwaite Lambert | 3,193 | 27.9 | |
| Progressive | Henry Lorenzo Jephson | 3,172 | 27.7 | |
| Municipal Reform | Henry James Clarke | 2,542 | 22.2 | |
| Municipal Reform | F. Russell Davies | 2,524 | 22.1 | |
| Majority | | | | |
| Progressive gain from Municipal Reform | | Swing | | |
| Progressive gain from Municipal Reform | | Swing | | |

1913 London County Council election: Islington West
| Party | Candidate | Votes | % | ±% |
|---|---|---|---|---|
| Progressive | Henry Mills | 2,999 | 27.9 | +0.0 |
| Progressive | Henry Lorenzo Jephson | 2,978 | 27.7 | +0.0 |
| Municipal Reform | C. W. French | 2,412 | 22.4 | +0.2 |
| Municipal Reform | Harold Frazer Wyatt | 2,372 | 22.0 | −0.1 |
| Majority | | 566 | 5.3 | −0.2 |
| Progressive hold | | Swing | -0.1 | |

1919 London County Council election: Islington West
| Party | Candidate | Votes | % | ±% |
|---|---|---|---|---|
| Progressive | Henry Mills | Unopposed | n/a | n/a |
| Progressive | James Skinner | Unopposed | n/a | n/a |
| Progressive hold | | Swing | n/a | |
| Progressive hold | | Swing | n/a | |

1922 London County Council election: Islington West
| Party | Candidate | Votes | % | ±% |
|---|---|---|---|---|
| Progressive | Henry Mills | 5,903 | 33.6 | n/a |
| Progressive | Frank Raffety | 5,746 | 32.7 | n/a |
| Labour | P. H. Black | 3,013 | 17.2 | n/a |
| Labour | G. Davison | 2,894 | 16.5 | n/a |
| Majority | | 2,733 | 15.5 | n/a |
| Progressive hold | | Swing | n/a | |
| Progressive hold | | Swing | n/a | |

1925 London County Council election: Islington West
| Party | Candidate | Votes | % | ±% |
|---|---|---|---|---|
| Progressive | Henry Mills | 4,029 | | |
| Municipal Reform | Sidney Charles Harper | 3,844 | | n/a |
| Labour | Ewart Culpin | 3,257 | | |
| Labour | E. Richards | 3,245 | | |
| Independent | J. H. Fassum | 323 | | n/a |
| Majority | | | | |
| Municipal Reform gain from Progressive | | Swing | | |
| Progressive hold | | Swing | | |

1928 London County Council election: Islington West
| Party | Candidate | Votes | % | ±% |
|---|---|---|---|---|
| Labour | George Bryant Naish | 4,424 | | |
| Labour | Arthur George Prichard | 4,377 | | |
| Municipal Reform | Moyra Goff | 2,825 | | |
| Municipal Reform | Alfred Lane Beit | 2,811 | | |
| Liberal | Thomas George Graham | 1,230 | | |
| Liberal | G. Moxham | 1,221 | | |
| Majority | | | | |
| Labour gain from Municipal Reform | | Swing | | |
| Labour hold | | Swing | | |

1931 London County Council election: Islington West
| Party | Candidate | Votes | % | ±% |
|---|---|---|---|---|
| Labour | Arthur George Prichard | 3,891 | | |
| Labour | George Bryant Naish | 3,800 | | |
| Municipal Reform | W. A. Button | 3,405 | | |
| Municipal Reform | Mavis Tate | 3,361 | | |
| Majority | | | | |
| Labour hold | | Swing | | |
| Labour hold | | Swing | | |

1934 London County Council election: Islington West
| Party | Candidate | Votes | % | ±% |
|---|---|---|---|---|
| Labour | Arthur George Prichard | 5,238 | | |
| Labour | George Bryant Naish | 5,210 | | |
| Municipal Reform | T. E. Beale | 3,518 | | |
| Municipal Reform | R. T. Walters | 3,485 | | |
| Majority | | | | |
| Labour hold | | Swing | | |
| Labour hold | | Swing | | |

1937 London County Council election: Islington West
| Party | Candidate | Votes | % | ±% |
|---|---|---|---|---|
| Labour | George Bryant Naish | 6,291 | | |
| Labour | Arthur George Prichard | 6,170 | | |
| Municipal Reform | R. T. Walters | 3,338 | | |
| Municipal Reform | G. Hampson | 3,304 | | |
| Liberal | W. C. Woodroofe | 330 | | |
| Liberal | John Seymour Spon | 216 | | |
| Majority | | | | |
| Labour hold | | Swing | | |
| Labour hold | | Swing | | |

1946 London County Council election: Islington West
| Party | Candidate | Votes | % | ±% |
|---|---|---|---|---|
| Labour | Albert Evans | Unopposed | N/A | N/A |
| Labour | George Bryant Naish | Unopposed | N/A | N/A |
| Majority | | Unopposed | N/A | N/A |
| Labour hold | | Swing | N/A | |
| Labour hold | | Swing | N/A | |
