= Islington, Mpumalanga =

Coordinates: 30°10′S 29°55′E

Islington
- Location within Mpumalanga Location within South Africa
- Country: South Africa
- Province: Mpumalanga
- District: Ehlanzeni
- Municipality: Bushbuckridge

Area
  - Total: 5.44 km^{2} (2.10 sq mi)

Population (2001)
  - Total: 4,004
  - Density: 736/km^{2} (1,910/sq mi)

Racial makeup (2011)
  - Black African: 100.0%

First languages (2011)
  - Tsonga: 96.8%
  - Sotho: 1.7%
  - Other: 1.4%
- Time zone: UTC+2 (SAST)
- PO box: 877026

Islington (or Khokhovela) is a settlement in the Ehlanzeni District Municipality in the Mpumalanga Province of South Africa. It is located east of Acornhoek.

== See also ==
- List of populated places in South Africa
