= Ahmed Khel =

Coordinates: 32°26′49″N 70°58′6″E

- Union council and town
- Interactive map of Ahmed Khel
- Country: Pakistan
- Region: Khyber-Pakhtunkhwa
- District: Lakki Marwat District
- Time zone: UTC+5 (PST)

Ahmed Khel is a town and union council in Lakki Marwat District of Khyber-Pakhtunkhwa, Pakistan.
