= Stickit minister =

In Scottish English, a stickit minister is a candidate for holy orders who either fails to pass the church's examination, or who gives an unsatisfactory sermon during his probationary period. Stickit minister is a colloquial idiom that connotes disgrace or dishonour. The Scottish Gaelic equivalent is ministear-maide.

There are two possible origins: One is, as the Scottish Gaelic version maide implies, that the minister is "wooden" and stick like, or alternatively that it refers to hesitancy, or "sticking". (stickit is the Lowland Scots for stuck). John Jamieson quotes an example: "Puir lad! The first time he tried to preach, he stickit his sermon", and further glosses: "A speech is stickit when the speaker hesitates and is unable to proceed".

The stickit minister was a recurring theme in Scottish literature during the 18th and 19th centuries; the most notable example is S. R. Crockett's short story "The Stickit Minister" (1893). A theme of this work is the humanity of Christianity. The stories offer examples of good ministerial behaviour and bad, and they theorise the role of faith in confronting hypocrisy, whether in others or in oneself.

The term is not related to the Religion of the Yellow Stick.
