= Islington Station =

Islington Station can refer to:

- Islington station (MBTA), a commuter rail station in Westwood, Massachusetts, United States
- Islington railway station, a commuter rail station in Adelaide, South Australia, Australia
- Islington railway station, New Zealand, a former station in Christchurch, New Zealand
- Islington station (Toronto), a subway station in Toronto, Ontario, Canada
- Highbury & Islington station, a railway and London Underground station in the London borough of Islington
- New Islington tram stop in Manchester, England
