= Edward Letchworth =

English freemasonry and author (1833–1917)

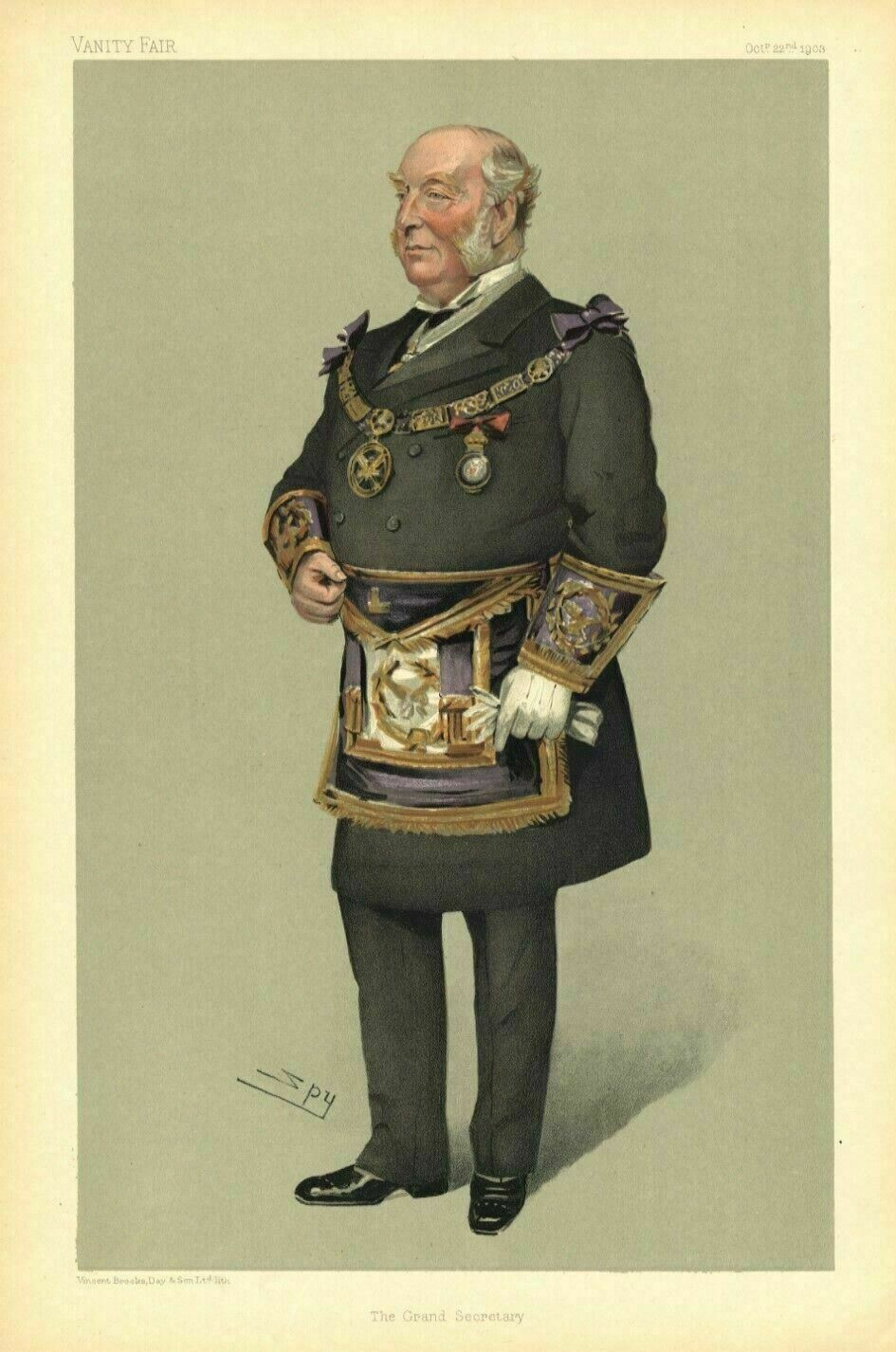
Letchworth, wearing masonc regalia, caricatured by Spy (Leslie Ward) in 1903 for Vanity Fair

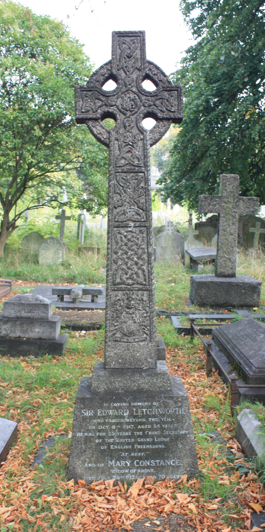
The grave of Sir Edward Letchworth, Brompton Cemetery

Sir Edward Letchworth (1833–1917) was a prominent figure in English freemasonry and author on the history of freemasonry.

== Life ==
He was born in 1833 into a Quaker family originally from the Letchworth area. He trained as a lawyer and was a keen volunteer soldier, serving in the Victoria Rifles from 1859 and from 1860 was an officer in the Middlesex Volunteers.

Originally initiated into the Jerusalem Lodge in 1875, he became a member of several lodges, rising rapidly to the rank of Grand Steward and was President of the Board of Grand Stewards in 1881. He was a member of the Garrick Club.

He was a Governor of St Bartholomew's Hospital and the Foundling Hospital.

From 1882 (following the death of Secretary Shadwell Clarke in 1891) until 1915 he was Secretary of the United Grand Lodge of England, with offices at Freemason's Hall, Great Queen Street, Holborn, London.

In 1914 Letchworth corresponded with Masons imprisoned at Ruhleben internment camp near Berlin during the First World War. During his period in office he attended the foundation of over 400 lodges.

He died on 8 October 1917 aged 84 and is buried in Brompton Cemetery in London.

== Artistic recognition ==
Much portrayed (and caricatured) artists creating his likeness include:

- Sir Leslie Ward (as "Spy")
- John Dick Bowie
- Walter William Ouless
- Harry Furniss

== Family ==
In 1902 (aged 69) he was married to Mary Constance (1851-1921), widow of Thomas Blaikie. They had no children.

== Publications ==
- Constitutions of the Free and Accepted Masons (1896)
- Constitutions of the Ancient Fraternity (1906)
- United Grand Lodge of England: Constitutions of the Free and Accepted Masons (1911)
