= Nathaniel Edward Yorke-Davies =

British physician and medical columnist

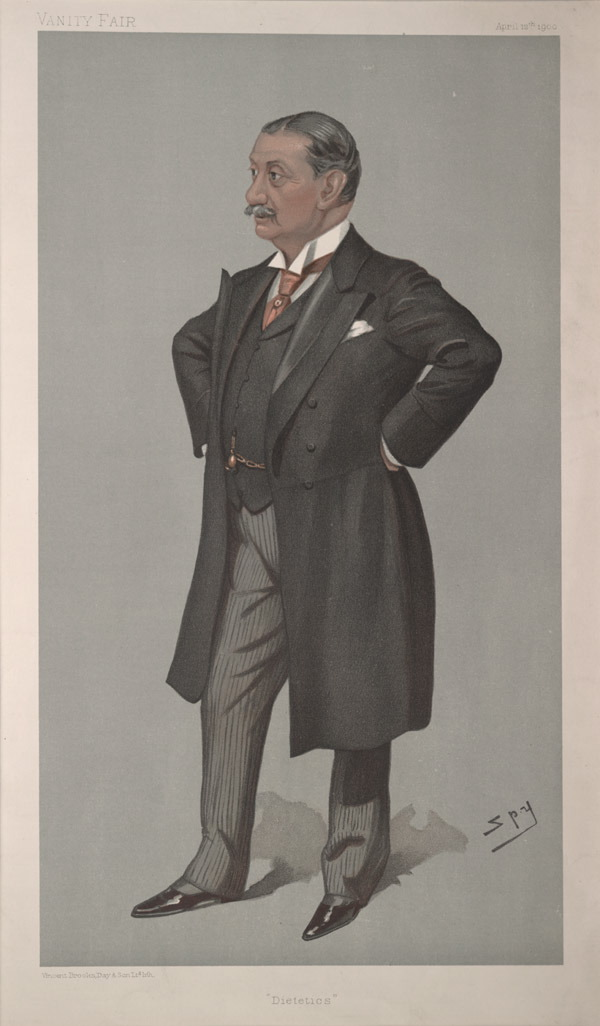
- "Dietetics". Caricature by Spy in Vanity Fair in April 1900
- Born: Nathaniel Edward Davies; 26 April 1841; Llanrwst, Denbighshire, Wales
- Died: 22 May 1914 (aged 73)
- Occupations: physician and dietetician
- Notable work: Foods for the Fat (1889); Living to Eat and Eating to Live (1891); Health and Condition (1894)

Nathaniel Edward Yorke-Davies (1841–1914) was a Welsh surgeon and dietician. His most famous patient was US President William Howard Taft.

== Early life and education ==
Yorke-Davies, whose father was headmaster at Llanrwst Grammar School, was educated at Cheltenham College and other schools before entering St Bartholomew's Hospital. He qualified L.S.A. in 1865, L.M. Dub. in 1865, M.R.C.S. Eng. in 1866, and L.R.C.P Lond. in 1871.

== Career ==
After a brief period of service in the Egyptian navy, he became a specialist in dietetics; he gained an international reputation in that speciality as an author of several books and numerous articles in medical and popular journals.

His 1889 book Foods for the Fat: A Treatise on Corpulency urged overweight people to a consult a physician, who would provide psychological support and an individualised plan for diet and exercise. His book criticised Banting's dietary plan for its extreme severity and Ebstein's dietary plan for recommending too much fat. The book remained popular for many years; the 17th edition appeared in 1906 and sold 35,000 copies.

Yorke-Davies provided his readers with recipes and advice on food intake based on hospital dietaries and in relation to expenditure of effort in work and physical activity. Food was to be carefully weighed, and reports of successful weight loss indicated that his dieters, too, were regularly weighed recording their week-by-week weight reduction. ... aside from the patients who consulted him at his Harley Street practice, others lived abroad and treatment took place via correspondence.

Gluten and bran baked goods made using Dr. Yorke-Davies's recipes were sold for the treatment of obesity and diabetes.

Upon his death he was survived by his widow, two sons, and a daughter.

== Selected publications ==
- One Thousand Medical Maxims and Surgical Hints. London: Chatto & Windus. 1883.
- Foods for the Fat: A Treatise on Corpulency and a Dietary for its Cure. Philadelphia: J.B. Lippincott. 1889.
- Wine and Health: How to Enjoy Both. London: Chatto & Windus. 1909.
