= Islington South West (London County Council constituency) =

London County Council constituency

- Former constituency for the London County Council

Former constituency
- Created: 1949
- Abolished: 1965
- Member(s): 3
- Created from: Islington South and Islington West

Islington South West was a constituency used for elections to the London County Council between 1949 and the council's abolition, in 1965. The seat shared boundaries with the UK Parliament constituency of the same name.

== Councillors ==
Year	Name	Party	Name	Party	Name	Party
1949	Duncan McArthur Jackson	Labour	Hugh L. Jones	Labour	George Percival Wright	Labour
1952	Fred Powe	Labour	Hugh L. Jones	Labour	Reginald Stamp	Labour
1956	Fred Powe	Labour	Herbert Lygoe	Labour	Reginald Stamp	Labour

== Election results ==
1949 London County Council election: Islington South West
Party	Candidate	Votes	%	±%
Labour	Duncan MacArthur Jackson	11,018		
Labour	Hugh Jones	10,578		
Labour	George Percival Wright	10,470		
Conservative	Tom Howard	8,075		
Conservative	V. E. Boatright	7,192		
Conservative	J. E. Ridsdale	6,872		

1952 London County Council election: Islington South West
Party	Candidate	Votes	%	±%
Labour	Hugh Jones	13,042		
Labour	Reginald Stamp	12,556		
Labour	Fred Powe	12,536		
Conservative	Tom Howard	5,672		
Conservative	V. E. Boatright	5,049		
Conservative	H. Cawley	5,025		
Labour hold		Swing		

1955 London County Council election: Islington South West
Party	Candidate	Votes	%	±%
Labour	Hugh Jones	7,531		
Labour	Fred Powe	7,390		
Labour	Reginald Stamp	7,260		
Conservative	L. C. Bassam	2,752		
Conservative	M. Ganderton	2,604		
Conservative	A. H. Rospo	2,598		
Liberal	I. H. Buckingham	700		
Liberal	M. H. Webber	388		
Liberal	A. V. Stitt	251		
Labour hold		Swing		

Herbert Lygoe was elected unopposed in 1956.

1958 London County Council election: Islington South West
Party	Candidate	Votes	%	±%
Labour	Fred Powe	7,456		
Labour	Herbert Lygoe	7,361		
Labour	Reginald Stamp	7,334		
Conservative	A. H. Rospo	1,760		
Conservative	G. Leeson	1,710		
Conservative	L. F. Bedford	1,646		
Labour hold		Swing		

1961 London County Council election: Islington South West
Party	Candidate	Votes	%	±%
Labour	Fred Powe	6,846		
Labour	Herbert Lygoe	6,777		
Labour	Reginald Stamp	6,696		
Conservative	R. A. Abbott	2,194		
Conservative	D. G. Gordon-Dean	2,158		
Conservative	T. B. Judson	2,057		
Communist	J. Moss	964		
Union Movement	F. C. Wade	886		
Union Movement	J. F. Kemp	865		
Union Movement	F. Bailey	854		
Liberal	R. H. Dodge	629		
Liberal	W. E. Ferguson	544		
Liberal	M. Levy	488		
Labour hold		Swing		
