= Robert Brudenell Carter =

British doctor (1828–1918)

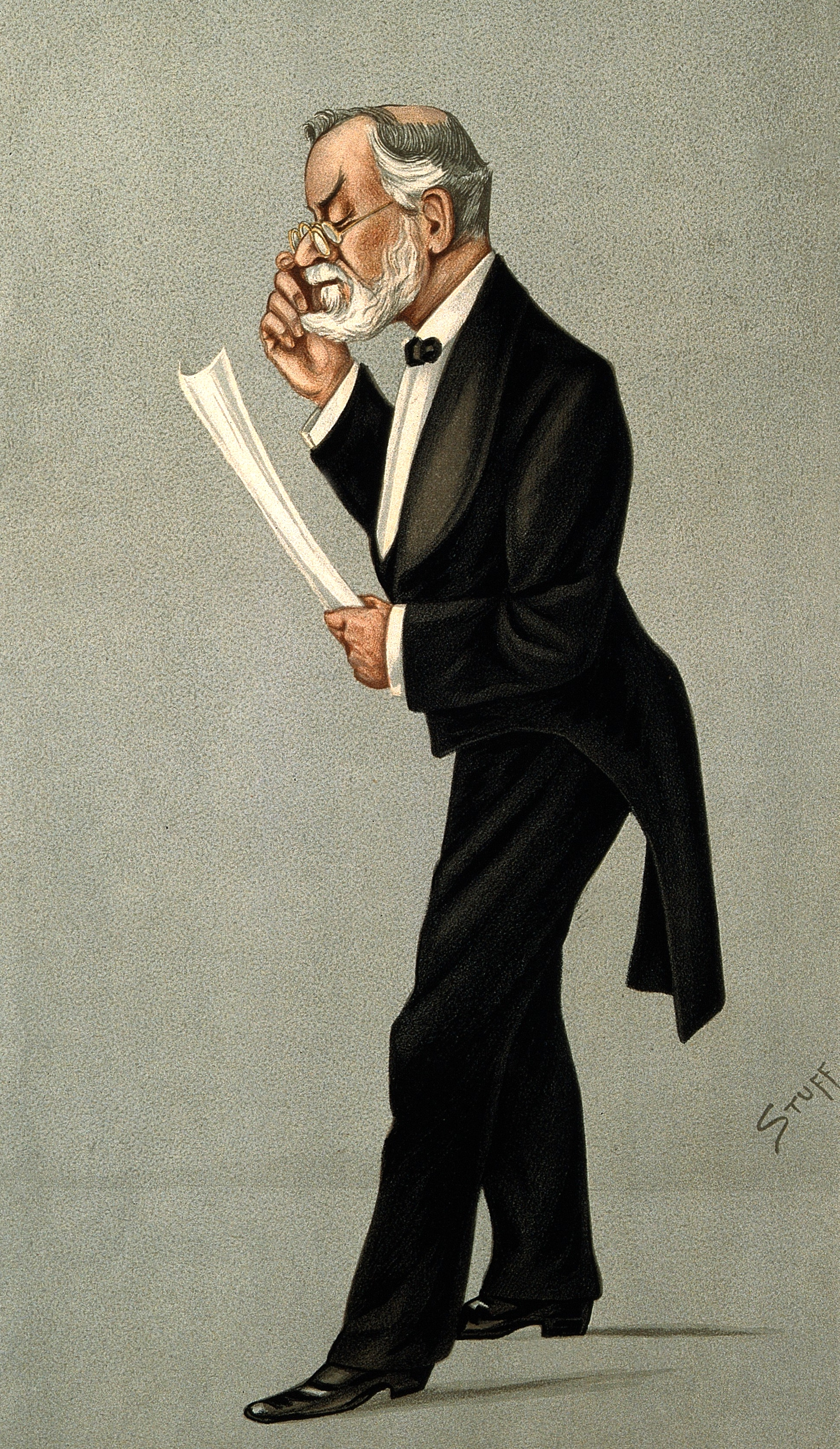
Caricature by "Stuff", Vanity Fair, 9 April 1892

Robert Brudenell Carter, FRCS (2 October 1828 – 23 October 1918) was a British physician and ophthalmic surgeon.

== Early life ==
Born in Little Wittenham, near Didcot, Berkshire, Carter was the son of a major in the Royal Marines and his mother died in giving birth to him. His father took no interest in him, and the newborn child came into the care of a family friend, Robert Brudenell, 6th Earl of Cardigan. As the baby was not expected to live, Brudenell ensured he was baptised, giving him his own Christian names. Carter was subsequently raised and eventually adopted by another family acquaintance.

== Medical career ==
Following a private education, Carter was apprenticed to a general practitioner, and entered the medical school of the London Hospital aged 19. He qualified as a Member of the Royal College of Surgeons in 1851 and as a Licentiate of the Society of Apothecaries in 1852. He opened a medical practice in Leytonstone in the suburbs of London and in 1853 published On the Pathology and Treatment of Hysteria. Soon after he moved to Putney in south London, and published his second book, On the Influence of Education and Training in Preventing Diseases of the Nervous System in 1855.

Before his second book had been published he had left for the Crimea, where he served as a staff surgeon in the British Army. Returning to England following the end of the conflict, he settled in Nottingham, where he helped to establish the Nottingham Eye Hospital in 1859. From this date Carter devoted his medical career entirely to ophthalmology. In 1862 he moved to Stroud, Gloucestershire, and was instrumental in the establishment of the Gloucester Eye Hospital in 1866. In 1864 he became a Fellow of the Royal College of Surgeons, and in 1868 moved to London and joined the staff of the Royal South London Ophthalmic Hospital in Southwark. He also began writing leading articles for The Times newspaper and The Lancet medical journal. From 1870 to 1883 he was ophthalmic surgeon at St George's Hospital and lecturer at the hospital's medical school. In 1875, he published A Practical Treatise on Diseases of the Eye , based on the lectures he gave to the students of St George's Hospital.

From 1887 to 1900 Carter was a member of the General Medical Council and also served as president of the Royal Medical Society. He was bitterly opposed to homeopathy, which he roundly condemned in his final book, Doctors and Their Work, Or, Medicine, Quackery, and Disease, published in 1903.

== Politics ==
Carter was briefly involved in local politics. In January 1889 the first elections to the London County Council were held, and he was nominated to contest the Islington West division. There were six candidates for the two seats to be filled, and Carter secured second place and election with 883 votes, 29 more than the third-placed candidate. Carter aligned himself with the Moderate Party on the council, which was allied to the parliamentary Conservative Party. When the next county council elections were held three years later, he failed to hold his seat, finishing last of four candidates.

Carter was a Knight of Grace of the Order of the Hospital of Saint John of Jerusalem, and was promoted to a Knight of Justice (KStJ) in the same order on 8 May 1902.

Carter died at his home near Clapham Common in 1918, aged 90, and was buried in West Norwood Cemetery.

== Works ==
- On the Influence of Education and Training in Preventing Diseases of the Nervous System (1855)
- A Practical Treatise on Diseases of the Eye (1875)
- Eyesight, Good & Bad: A Treatise on the Exercise and Preservation of Vision (1880)
- Our Homes, and how to Make Them Healthy (1883)
- Doctors and Their Work, Or, Medicine, Quackery, and Disease (1903)
