= List of Vanity Fair (British magazine) caricatures (1880–1884) =

<< List of Vanity Fair caricatures (1875–1879) >> List of Vanity Fair caricatures (1885–1889)

The following is from a list of caricatures published 1880–1884 by the British magazine Vanity Fair (1868–1914).

Publication Date	Subject	Caption	Caricaturist	Notes	Pic.
1880-01-03	Henry Savile	The Turf	Spy	M 0213	
1880-01-10	Samuel Ward	Uncle Sam	Spy	M 0214	
1880-01-17	Capt Lord Edric Gifford	VC	Spy	S 320	
1880-01-24	Émile Zola	French Realism	T	M 0215	
1880-01-31	Sir Roger Palmer, 5th Baronet	Roger	Spy	M 0216	
1880-02-07	Vice-Adm Sir Reginald Macdonald	Rim	Spy	M 0217	
1880-02-14	Col Robert Kingscote	The Court	Spy	S 321	
1880-02-21	Edward Whitley	Liverpool	Spy	S 322	
1880-02-28	Commander John Ramsay, Lord Ramsay	Liverpool	Spy	M 0218	
1880-03-06	Col James Keith Fraser	Keith	Spy	M 0219	
1880-03-13	Edward Clarke	Southwark	Spy	S 323	
1880-03-20	Markham Spofforth	He invented the Conservative Working Man	Ape	M 0220	
1880-03-27	Algernon Keith-Falconer, Lord Inverurie	Candidate for Chelsea	Spy	M 0221	
1880-04-03	Charles Allanson-Winn, 4th Baron Headley	a loyal Irishman	Ape	M 0222	
1880-04-10	Gen Sir Frederick Roberts	Bobs	WGR	M 0223	
1880-04-17	George Burrow Gregory	East Sussex	Spy	S 324	
1880-04-24	Lt-Col Henry Stracy	Henry	Ape	M 0224	
1880-05-01	M Jean-Louis-Ernest Meissonier	a great French painter	T	M 0225	
1880-05-08	Arthur Guinness, Baron Ardilaun	a practical patriot	Spy	S 325	
1880-05-15	Henry Calcraft	Board of Trade	Spy	M 0226	
1880-05-22	Baron Henry de Worms	Intelligent Toryism	Ape	S 326	
1880-05-29	David Plunket	hereditary eloquence	Ape	S 327	
1880-06-05	Sir William Gordon-Cumming, 4th Baronet	Bill	Ape	M 0227	
1880-06-12	Charles Bradlaugh	Iconoclast	Spy	S 328	
1880-06-19	Frederick Greenwood	He created The Pall Mall Gazette	Ape	M 0228	
1880-06-26	Sir Augustus Berkeley Paget	Promotion by marriage	T	S 329	
1880-07-03	William Pleydell-Bouverie, Viscount Folkestone	South Wilts	Ape	S 330	
1880-07-06	The Treasury Bench	Babble, Birth and Brummagem	T	SS; Gladstone, Hartington and Chamberlain	
1880-07-10	Lord Randolph Churchill	a younger Son	Spy	S 331	
1880-07-17	Charles Chetwynd-Talbot, 20th Earl of Shrewsbury	the premier Earl	Spy	S 332	
1880-07-24	Col Lewis Guy Phillips	Order at Wimbledon	Ape	M 0229	
1880-07-31	John Eldon Gorst	Tory organisation	Spy	S 333	
1880-08-07	Montague Guest	Monty	Spy	S 334	
1880-08-14	Sir Charles John Forbes, 4th Baronet	of Newe	Ape	M 0230	
1880-08-21	James Russell Lowell	Hosea Biglow	T	S 335	
1880-08-28	Frank Hugh O'Donnell	Roman Catholic Home-Rule	T	S 336	
1880-09-04	Henry Richard	Peace	Spy	S 337	
1880-09-11	Charles Stewart Parnell	Anti Rent	T	S 338	
1880-09-18	Henry Paget, 4th Marquess of Anglesey	the head of the Pagets	Ape	S 339	
1880-09-25	Leonard Courtney	Proper self-sufficiency	T	S 340	
1880-10-02	George Finch-Hatton, 11th Earl of Winchilsea	Youth	Spy	S 341	
1880-10-09	Ernest Brudenell-Bruce, 3rd Marquess of Ailesbury	Three Dowagers	T	S 342	
1880-10-16	Sir John Sinclair, 3rd Baronet	A Poet	Ape	S 343	
1880-10-23	Daniel O'Donoghue	The O'Donoghue	Spy	S 344	
1880-10-30	Percy Wyndham	Æsthetics	Spy	S 345	
1880-11-06	Sir Henry Bessemer	Steel	Spy	M 0231	
1880-11-13	Newton Wallop, Viscount Lymington	Young Oxford	Spy	S 346	
1880-11-20	Edmond François Valentin About	French fiction	T	M 0232	
1880-11-27	Capt John Bastard	Horses	Spy	M 0233	
1880-12-01	Lord Randolph Churchill, Arthur Balfour, Henry Drummond Wolff and John Eldon Gorst	The Fourth Party	Spy	WS	
1880-12-04	Léon Say	President No. 3	Ape	S 347	
1880-12-11	Alderman Sir Robert Carden	City justice	Spy	S 348	
1880-12-18	William James Erasmus Wilson	the Obelisk	Spy	M 0234	
1880-12-25	Victorien Sardou	Ficelle Dramatique	T	M 0235	
1881-01-01	George Conyngham, 3rd Marquess Conyngham	Mount	Spy	S 349	
1881-01-08	Francis Burnand	Punch	Ape	M 0236	
1881-01-15	Sir Richard Temple, 1st Baronet	Burra Dick	Spy	S 350	
1881-01-22	Joseph Boehm	the Queen's Sculptor	Spy	M 0237	
1881-01-29	Charles Boycott	Boycott	Spy	M 0238	
1881-02-05	Sir Bache Cunard, 3rd Baronet	A Cunarder	Spy	M 0239	
1881-02-12	John Morgan Howard	Energetic Toryism	Spy	M 0240	
1881-02-19	Lt-Col Charles George Gordon	The ever victorious army	Ape	M 0241	
1881-02-26	Valentine Browne, 4th Earl of Kenmare	The Lord Chamberlain	Spy	S 351	
1881-03-05	James Hamilton, Marquess of Hamilton MP	Hamlie	Spy	S 352	
1881-03-12	William Burdett-Coutts	The Baroness husband	Spy	M 0242	
1881-03-19	Sir Farrer Herschell	the Solicitor-General	Spy	S 353	
1881-03-26	J. C. Ryle	Liverpool	Ape	S 354	
1881-04-02	Robert Adair, 1st Baron Waveney	Suffolk	Spy	S 355	
1881-04-09	William Cecil, 3rd Marquess of Exeter	a real English gentleman	Ape	S 356	
1881-04-16	Horatio Nelson, 3rd Earl Nelson	the noblest of English names	Spy	S 357	
1881-04-23	George Bingham, 3rd Earl of Lucan	Balaklava	Ape	S 358	
1881-04-30	John Tollemache, 1st Baron Tollemache	Cheshire	Spy	S 359	
1881-05-07	Isma'il Pasha	The ex-Khedive	T	S 360	
1881-05-14	Sir Philip Rose, 1st Baronet	Lord Beaconsfield's friend	Spy	M 0243	
1881-05-21	W. S. Gilbert	Patience	Spy	M 0244	
1881-05-28	Frederick J. Archer	the favourite Jockey	Spy	M 0245	
1881-06-04	George Cadogan, 5th Earl Cadogan	Chelsea and the Colonies	Spy	S 361	
1881-06-11	Thomas Lister, 4th Baron Ribblesdale	Mufti	Spy	S 362	
1881-06-18	George Spencer-Churchill, Marquess of Blandford	B	T	M 0246	
1881-06-25	Alderman Robert Fowler	the City	T	S 363	
1881-07-02	Charles Cox	Colonial	Spy	M 0247	
1881-07-05	Her Majesty's Opposition	Birth, Behaviour and Business	T	SS; Lord JJ Manners, Sir SH Northcote, and Sir RA Cross	
1881-07-09	Col Henry Ewart	Croppy	T	M 0248	
1881-07-16	George Harris, 4th Baron Harris	Kent	Spy	S 364	
1881-07-23	Sir Matthew White Ridley, 5th Baronet	Ex-official	Ape	S 365	
1881-07-30	Gilbert Heathcote-Drummond-Willoughby, Baron Aveland	A great officer of State	Spy	S 366	
1881-08-06	Beauchamp Scott, 6th Earl of Clonmell	Earlie	Ape	S 367	
1881-08-13	George Coventry, 9th Earl of Coventry	Covey	Ape	S 368	
1881-08-20	Alexander Grantham Yorke	Alick	Spy	M 0249	
1881-08-27	Henry Percy, Earl Percy	Northumberland	T	S 369	
1881-09-03	Gen Frederic Thesiger, 2nd Baron Chelmsford	Isandula	Spy	S 370	
1881-09-10	John Walter	The Times	Spy	S 371	
1881-09-17	Hugh Fortescue, 3rd Earl Fortescue	Sanitas	T	S 372	
1881-09-24	Lord Henry Montagu-Douglas-Scott	South Hants	T	S 373	
1881-10-01	Henry Fitzalan-Howard, 15th Duke of Norfolk	Our little Duke	Spy	S 374	
1881-10-08	William McArthur	The Lord Mayor	Spy	S 375	
1881-10-15	Frederick Thellusson, 5th Baron Rendlesham	Property in Suffolk	T	S 376	
1881-10-22	Thomas Parker, 6th Earl of Macclesfield	A coachman	Spy	S 377	
1881-10-29	William Lowther	Westmorland	Spy	S 378	
1881-11-05	Sir Rainald Knightley, 3rd Baronet	a fine old Tory	Spy	S 379	
1881-11-12	Robert St Clair-Erskine, 4th Earl of Rosslyn	The Kirk of Scotland	T	S 380	
1881-11-19	Colin Blackburn, Baron Blackburn	a lord of appeal	Spy	S 381	
1881-11-26	Cornwallis Maude, 4th Viscount Hawarden	hereditary whip	T	S 382	
1881-12-03	Mordaunt Bisset	The General	Spy	S 383	
1881-12-07	Charles Stewart Parnell and John Dillon	Force no Remedy	Furniss	WS	
1881-12-07	William Ewart Gladstone and Charles Bradlaugh	The Gladstone Memorial		WS	
1881-12-10	Charles Spencer	Bradlaugh's Baby	Spy	S 384	
1881-12-17	Alexander Leslie-Melville, 10th Earl of Leven	amiability	Spy	S 385	
1881-12-24	Vice-Adm Sir John Edmund Commerell	A Jingo	T	M 0250	
1881-12-31	TAlgernon Fulke-Greville	Racing & Politics	Spy	M 0251	
1882-01-07	Hungerford Crewe, 3rd Baron Crewe	Lay Episcopacy	Spy	S 386	
1882-01-14	Samuel Smiles	Self-help	Spy	M 0252	
1882-01-21	Daniel Cooper	Sydney	Spy	M 0253	
1882-01-28	Sir Thomas Bateson, 2nd Baronet	Landed Estates in Ireland	Spy	S 387	
1882-02-04	Thomas Agar-Robartes, 1st Baron Robartes	Cornwall	Spy	S 388	
1882-02-11	William Henry Gladstone	His father's son	Spy	S 389	
1882-02-18	John Holms	Military changes	Spy	S 390	
1882-02-25	William FitzClarence, 2nd Earl of Munster	Brighton	Spy	S 391	
1882-03-04	Lawrence Palk, 1st Baron Haldon	Torquay	Spy	S 392	
1882-03-11	Sampson Lloyd	Fair Trade	Spy	M 0254; chairman, Lloyds Bank	
1882-03-18	Douglas Graham, 5th Duke of Montrose	Scotland and Racing	Spy	S 393	
1882-03-25	Edward Douglas-Pennant, 1st Baron Penrhyn	Slate	Spy	S 394	
1882-04-01	George Errington	the Vatican	T	S 395	
1882-04-08	Sir John Mowbray	Committee of Selection	Spy	S 396	
1882-04-15	Arthur Loftus Tottenham	Lofty	Spy	S 397	
1882-04-22	George Montagu, Viscount Mandeville	Kim	Spy	M 0255	
1882-04-29	Thomas Charles Bruce	Portsmouth	Spy	S 398	
1882-05-06	Herbert Gladstone	Young hopeful	Spy	S 399	
1882-05-13	Lewis Llewelyn Dillwyn	a wet Quaker	Spy	S 400	
1882-05-20	Dunbar Douglas, 6th Earl of Selkirk	Created in 1646	Spy	S 401	
1882-05-27	William Edward Hartpole Lecky	the eighteenth century	Spy	M 0256	
1882-06-03	William Cavendish-Bentinck, 6th Duke of Portland	the Young Duke	Spy	S 402	
1882-06-10	Montagu David Scott	East Sussex	Spy	S 403	
1882-06-17	John Anstruther-Thomson	Fife	Spy	M 0257; Deputy Lieutenant of Fife	
1882-06-24	Capt Arthur Gooch	Goochie	Spy	M 0258	
1882-07-01	John Henniker-Major, 5th Baron Henniker	a man of business	T	S 404	
1882-07-05	Thomas Baring, 1st Earl of Northbrook, Granville Leveson-Gower, 2nd Earl Granville, Roundell Palmer, 1st Earl of Selborne and Robert Gascoyne-Cecil, 3rd Marquess of Salisbury	Purse, Pussy, Piety and Prevarication	T	SS	
1882-07-08	Sir John Bennet Lawes, 1st Baronet	Agricultural Science	T	M 0259	
1882-07-15	Sir Harry Verney, 2nd Baronet	Bucks	Spy	S 405	
1882-07-22	Henry Fox-Strangways, 5th Earl of Ilchester	Fifth Earl	Spy	S 406	
1882-07-29	Sir Alexander Milne, 1st Baronet	Admiral of the Fleet	T	M 0260	
1882-08-05	Frederick Barne	the Jockey Club	Spy	M 0261	
1882-08-12	Bernard FitzPatrick	Barnie	Spy	S 407	
1882-08-19	Cyril Flower	The Senator	T	S 408	
1882-08-26	Cetshwayo	Restored	Spy	So 16	
1882-09-02	George Fordham	The Demon	Spy	M 0262	
1882-09-09	Thomas de Grey, 6th Baron Walsingham	a Naturalist	T	S 409	
1882-09-16	Lord Charles Bruce	Marlborough	Spy	S 410	
1882-09-23	Ivor Guest, 1st Baron Wimborne	Tennis	T	S 411	
1882-09-30	Sir Adolphus Liddell	Dodo	Spy	M 0263	
1882-10-07	Col John J Macdonnell	Mac	Spy	M 0264	
1882-10-14	John Henry Puleston	Devonport	Spy	S 412	
1882-10-21	Ellis Ashmead-Bartlett	The Patriotic League	Spy	S 413	
1882-10-28	George Armitstead	Dundee	Spy	S 414	
1882-11-04	Sir John Ellis	The Lord Mayor	Spy	M 0265	
1882-11-11	Henry Edwards	Weymouth	Spy	S 415	
1882-11-18	Maharajah Duleep Singh	The Maharajah	Spy	M 0266	
1882-11-25	Gen William Booth	the Salvation Army	Spy	M 0267	
1882-12-02	Henry Foley, 5th Baron Foley	a liberal Peer	Spy	S 416	
1882-12-05	Alexandra of Denmark	HRH The Princess of Wales	Chartran	WS	
1882-12-09	Sir Daniel Gooch, 1st Baronet	the Great Western	Spy	S 417	
1882-12-16	Dion Boucicault	the Sensation Drama	Spy	M 0268	
1882-12-23	Col Charles Lindsay	Army, Court and Volunteers	Spy	M 0269	
1882-12-30	William Hurrell Mallock	Is life worth living?	Spy	M 0270	
1883-01-06	Ahmed Urabi	Ahmed Arabi the Egyptian	FV	M 0271	
1883-01-13	Sir John Bennett	Clocks	Spy	M 0272	
1883-01-20	Tewfik Pasha	The Khedive	FV	M 0273; he holds the badge of the Order of Osmania	
1883-01-27	Francis Baring, Viscount Baring	Winchester	Spy	S 418	
1883-02-03	Sir Coutts Lindsay, 2nd Baronet	The Grosvenor Gallery	Jopling	M 0274	
1883-02-10	Capt Henry Montague Hozier	Lloyds	Jopling	M 0275; Secretary of Lloyd's and father of Clementine Churchill	
1883-02-17	Grace Vane, Dowager Duchess of Cleveland	Her Grace the Duchess Dowager of Cleveland	Chartran	L 01	
1883-02-24	Sir Henry Hoare, 5th Baronet	reformed Radical	Spy	M 0276	
1883-03-03	Richard A. Proctor	Astronomy	Spy	M 0277	
1883-03-10	Maj-Gen Edwyn Sherard Burnaby	a Crimean hero	T	S 419	
1883-03-17	Gen Sir Henry Ponsonby	The Privy Purse	T	M 0278	
1883-03-24	William Thackeray Marriott	Brighton	T	S 420	
1883-03-31	Sir Charles James Freake, 1st Baronet	an eminent builder	T	M 0279	
1883-04-07	Sir Julian Pauncefote	The Foreign Office	T	M 0280	
1883-04-14	Charles Baring	an old Coldstreamer	T	M 0281	
1883-04-21	Lt-Col Ralph Vivian	Ralph	T	M 0282	
1883-04-28	Rear-Adm Sir Anthony Hoskins	Naval Reserves	Spy	M 0283	
1883-05-05	Charles Russell	a splendid advocate	VER	S 421	
1883-05-12	Charles Bennet Lawes	Athlete and Sculptor	VER	M 0284	
1883-05-19	Lord Gerald FitzGerald	a Wandering Minstrel	Spy	M 0285; son of the Duke of Leinster	
1883-05-26	Richard Webster	Law and conscience	VER	M 0286	
1883-06-02	Thomas Thornhill	Tom	VER	S 422	
1883-06-09	Charles Tennant	Glasgow	VER	S 423	
1883-06-16	Robert Duff	Fetteresso	VER	S 424	
1883-06-23	Sir Edmund Lechmere, 3rd Baronet	St John of Jerusalem	T	S 425	
1883-06-30	Capt William George Middleton	Bay	T	M 0287	
1883-07-07	Charles Bateman-Hanbury-Kincaid-Lennox	Charlie	Spy	M 0288	
1883-07-14	Gen George Keppel, 6th Earl of Albemarle	Waterloo	T	S 426	
1883-07-21	Alan Gardner, 3rd Baron Gardner	Fox hunting	Spy	S 427	
1883-07-28	John Hinde Palmer	Lincoln	Spy	S 428	
1883-08-04	Thomas Coke, 2nd Earl of Leicester	Agriculture	Spy	S 429	
1883-08-11	George Cholmondeley, Earl of Rocksavage	Rock	Spy	M 0289	
1883-08-18	William Onslow, 4th Earl of Onslow	a Parliamentary Title	Spy	S 430	
1883-08-25	Gen St George Gerald Foley	The friend of Pelissier	Spy	M 0290; son of Baron Foley	
1883-09-01	Louisa Beresford, Marchioness of Waterford	The Marchioness of Waterford	Chartran	L 02; daughter of the Duke of Beaufort	
1883-09-08	Stephen Moore, 3rd Earl Mount Cashell	Ninety-one	Spy	S 431	
1883-09-15	Edward Digby, 9th Baron Digby	Lord Leicester's nephew	Spy	S 432	
1883-09-22	John Dalrymple, 10th Earl of Stair	White Dal	Spy	S 433	
1883-09-29	Ian Ogilvy-Grant, 8th Earl of Seafield	Sheep	Spy	S 434	
1883-10-06	Gladys, Countess of Lonsdale	Gladys, Countess of Lonsdale	Chartran	L 03	
1883-10-13	Charles Cecil Cotes	a Liberal Whip	Spy	S 435	
1883-10-20	Henry Corbet of Adderley Hall	Born in the Scarlet	Spy	M 0291	
1883-10-27	Maj Hugh Dawnay, 8th Viscount Downe	Smartness	Spy	S 436	
1883-11-03	Angela Burdett-Coutts, 1st Baroness Burdett-Coutts	The Baroness Burdett-Coutts	T	L 04	
1883-11-10	Francis Fane, 12th Earl of Westmorland	the affable Earl	Spy	S 437	
1883-11-17	Evelyn Ashley	Palmerston's Secretary	Spy	S 438	
1883-11-24	Edward Leeson, 6th Earl of Milltown	a persevering politician	Spy	S 439	
1883-11-27	The Cabinet Council, 1883	The Gladstone Cabinet	T	WS; Gladstone, Selborne, Granville, Derby, Spencer, Kimberley, Northbrook, Hartington, Carlingford, Harcourt, Childers, Dodson, Chamberlain, Dilke	
1883-12-01	Ida Bennet, Countess of Dalhousie	The Countess of Dalhousie	T	L 05	
1883-12-08	William McCullagh Torrens	Finsbury	Spy	S 440	
1883-12-15	Richard Quain	Lord Beaconsfield's Physician	Spy	M 0292	
1883-12-22	Howard Vincent	Criminal Investigation	Spy	M 0293	
1883-12-29	Lt-Col Henry Townshend Forester	The Lad	Spy	M 0294; son of Baron Forester	
1884-01-05	Lady Florence Dixie	The Lady Florence Dixie	T	L 06	
1884-01-12	Sir Edward Malet	Justice! Justice! Justice!	Spy	M 0295	
1884-01-19	Seymour Portman	Horse-race management	Spy	M 0296	
1884-01-26	Hubert von Herkomer	Painter, Sculptor, Blacksmith &c	FG	M 0297	
1884-02-02	Mary Coventry, Baroness Holland	The Lady Holland	T	L 07; daughter of the Earl of Coventry	
1884-02-09	Sir Charles Lennox Wyke	the Baron	Ape	M 0298	
1884-02-16	Capt Conway Seymour	Despatches	Spy	M 0299	
1884-02-23	Arthur Coventry	The Baby	Spy	M 0300	
1884-03-01	Candida Louisa Bartolucci, Marchioness of Tweeddale	The Marchioness of Tweedale	T	L 08	
1884-03-08	Shipley Erskine, Lord Cardross	Horsey	Spy	M 0301	
1884-03-15	Henry Brand	Ordnance	Spy	S 441	
1884-03-22	Lawrence Palk, 2nd Baron Haldon	a legislator	Spy	S 442	
1884-03-29	Thorold Rogers	a professor	Spy	S 443	
1884-04-05	Empress Elisabeth of Austria	HIM the Empress of Austria	Grimm	L 09	
1884-04-12	Lt-Gen George Higginson	a good soldier	Spy	M 0302	
1884-04-19	Joseph Parker	Congregational Union?	Ape	M 0303	
1884-04-26	Carl Haag	The glorious East	Go	M 0304	
1884-05-03	Georgina Weldon	Mrs Weldon	Spy	L 10	
1884-05-10	Charles Warton	Hear! Hear!! Hear!!! Hear!!!!	Ape	S 444	
1884-05-17	Frederick Hanbury-Tracy	gentle and liberal	Spy	S 445	
1884-05-24	Oscar Wilde	Oscar	Ape	M 0305	
1884-05-31	Alfred de Rothschild	Alfred	Spy	M 0306	
1884-06-07	Victoria, Princess Royal	The Princess Royal	Nemo	L 11	
1884-06-14	Algernon Percy, 6th Duke of Northumberland	the House of Percy	Spy	S 446	
1884-06-21	Donald Currie	the Knight of the Cruise of Mr Gladstone	Ape	S 447	
1884-06-28	Sir John Ramsden, 5th Baronet	Huddersfield	Spy	S 448	
1884-07-05	Vice-Adm Victor, Count Gleichen	The Queen's nephew	Go	P 08	
1884-07-12	John Coupland	the Quorn	Ape	M 0307	
1884-07-19	William Cornwallis Cartwright	Oxfordshire	Spy	S 449	
1884-07-26	Sir Walter Stirling, 2nd Baronet	two-and-eighty	Spy	M 0308	
1884-08-02	John Slagg	Manchester	Ape	S 450	
1884-08-09	Henry Broadhurst	the working-man Member	Spy	S 451	
1884-08-16	Police Inspector Ebenezer Denning	Parliamentary Police	Ape	M 0309	
1884-08-23	Count Helmuth von Moltke the Elder	Modern Strategy	Go	M 0310	
1884-08-30	George Charles Brodrick	Merton College	Spy	M 0311	
Sir John Christopher Willoughby, 5th Baronet	high prices	Spy	M 0312		
1884-09-13	George Bonnor	Australian cricket	Ape	M 0313	
1884-09-20	Alfred Lyttelton	English cricket	Ape	M 0314	
1884-09-27	Henri d'Orleans, duke of Aumale	The Orleans Family	Nemo	P 09	
1884-10-04	John Hubbard	old Mother Hubbard	Spy	S 452	
1884-10-11	Alexander III of Russia	my august master	Nemo	So 17	
1884-10-18	Charles Palmer	Shipping	Ape	S 453	
1884-10-25	Walter George	The Champion of champions	Ape	M 0315	
1884-11-01	Thomas Firr	the huntsman	Spy	M 0316	
1884-11-08	Frederick Knight	has sat for three and forty years	Spy	S 454	
1884-11-15	James Gordon Bennett, Jr.	New York Herald	Nemo	M 0317	
1884-11-22	Sir Thomas Chambers	The deceased wife's sister	Spy	S 455	
1884-11-29	Henry Hansard	Hansard	Ape	M 0318	
1884-12-06	Capt Arthur Smith	Doggie	Ape	M 0319	
1884-12-13	Leopold de Rothschild	Racing and Sporting	Spy	M 0320	
1884-12-20	Edward Bickersteth, Dean of Lichfield	Convocation	Spy	M 0321	
1884-12-27	Nikolay Girs	The Russian Foreign Office	Nemo	S 456	
