= List of Vanity Fair (British magazine) caricatures (1870–1874) =

<< List of Vanity Fair caricatures (1868–1869) >> List of Vanity Fair caricatures (1875–1879)

The following is from a list of caricatures published 1870–1874 by the British magazine Vanity Fair (1868–1914).

Publication Date	Subject	Caption	Caricaturist	Notes	Pic.
1870-01-01	Pope Pius IX	The Infallible	Coïdé	So 06	
1870-01-08	Chief Justice William Bovill	The majesty of the Law	Ape	J 03	
1870-01-15	Émile Ollivier	The Parliamentary Empire	Coïdé	M 0003	
1870-01-22	Henri Rochefort	La Voyoucratie	Coïdé	M 0004	
1870-01-29	Victor Emmanuel II	Il Re Galantuomo	Coïdé	So 07	
1870-02-05	Frederic Thesiger, 1st Baron Chelmsford	It is hardly to be believed that two political leaders should fall out only because their wives cannot agree	ATn	S 039	
1870-02-12	Sir John Pakington	He was Chairman of the Quarter Sessions and reconstructed the Navy	ATn	S 040	
1870-02-19	Sir Robert Collier	Sir John Coleridge serves under him	ATn	S 041	
1870-02-26	John Townshend, 5th Marquess Townshend	The Beggar's Friend	ATn	S 042	
1870-03-05	Sjt William Ballantine	He resisted the temptation to cross-examine a Prince of the blood	ATn	M 0005	
1870-03-12	Evelyn Dennison, Speaker of the House of Commons	The first of the Commoners of England	ATn	S 043	
1870-03-19	Sir Robert Peel	A professor of strong languages	ATn	S 044	
1870-03-26	Charles Gordon-Lennox, 6th Duke of Richmond	Highly respectable	ATn	S 045	
1870-04-02	Sir Frederick Pollock, 1st Baronet	A souvenir	ATn	J 04	
1870-04-09	Frederick Hamilton-Temple-Blackwood, 5th Baron Dufferin	An exceptional Irishman	ATn	S 046	
1870-04-16	Mansur Ali Khan of Bengal	A living monument of English injustice	ATn	So 08	
1870-04-23	Prince George, Duke of Cambridge	A military difficulty	ATn	S 047	
1870-04-30	Sir John Coleridge	A risen barrister	ATn	S 048	
1870-05-07	Adm Henry John Rous	As straight as a reed	ATn	M 0005	
1870-05-14	Francis, Duke of Teck	The most popular of princes he has married the most popular of princesses	ATn	M 0006	
1870-05-21	Sir Joseph Hawley	The purist of the Turf	ATn	M 0007	
1870-05-28	Ralph Bernal Osborne	The smart critic	ATn	S 049	
1870-06-04	William Vernon Harcourt	He was considered an able man till he assumed his own name	ATn	S 050	
1870-06-11	Edward Knatchbull-Hugessen	A promising apprentice	Ape	S 051	
1870-06-18	William Ward, 1st Earl of Dudley	Property	Ape	S 052	
1870-06-25	Thomas Heron Jones, 7th Viscount Ranelagh	He has succeeded in volunteering	Ape	M 0009	
1870-07-02	John Spencer, 5th Earl Spencer	The Messenger of Peace	Ape	S 053	
1870-07-09	George Sutherland-Leveson-Gower, 3rd Duke of Sutherland	Simple and unassuming himself, yet magnificent and generous towards his fellow men, he is the very Prince of Dukes	Ape	S 054	
1870-07-16	Hugh Grosvenor, 3rd Marquess of Westminster	The Richest man in England	Ape	S 055	
1870-07-23	Francis Charteris, Lord Elcho	His course has been if not a wise yet a consistent one and dictated by conscience only	Ape	S 056	
1870-07-30	Lord Henry Lennox	A man of Fashion and Politics	Ape	S 057	
1870-08-06	Charles Wood, 1st Viscount Halifax	He fell off his horse into a Peerage	Ape	S 058	
1870-08-13	Charles Newdigate Newdegate	A Jesuit in disguise	Ape	S 059	
1870-08-20	Hugh Rose, 1st Baron Strathnairn	He was made a Statesman because he was a soldier	Ape	S 060	
1870-08-27	Sir Henry Bulwer	A superannuated diplomat	Ape	S 061	
1870-09-03	Richard Monckton Milnes, 1st Baron Houghton	The cool of the evening	Ape	S 062	
1870-09-10	Alexander Beresford Hope	Batavian grace	Ape	S 063	
1870-09-17	Gen Louis Jules Trochu	The hope of France	Coïdé	M 0010	
1870-09-24	Frederick, Crown Prince of Prussia	Fritz	Coïdé	M 0011	
1870-10-01	Lord Robert Montagu	A Working Conservative	Ape	S 064	
1870-10-08	Sir Stafford Northcote	He does his duty to his party and is fortunate if it happens to be also his duty to his country	Ape	S 065	
1870-10-15	Otto von Bismarck	The ablest statesman in Europe	Coïdé	S 066	
1870-10-22	Thomas Carlyle	The Diogenes of the Modern Corinthians without his Tub	Ape	M 0012	
1870-10-29	Edward Bulwer-Lytton, 1st Baron Lytton	The representative of Romance	Ape	S 067	
1870-11-05	John Cranch Walker Vivian	Always pleasant, always genial	Ape	S 068; brother of Baron Vivian	
1870-11-12	John Jackson, Bishop of London	One who has grieved more than others over 'The Sinfulness of Little Sins'	Ape	S 069	
1870-11-19	John Campbell, Marquess of Lorne	If everywhere as successful as in love a great destiny awaits him	Ape	M 0013	
1870-11-26	Sir Roderick Murchison	A faithful friend and eminent Savant and the best possible of Presidents	Ape	M 0014	
1870-12-03	Baron Philipp von Brunnow	One of the most precious products of political Miscengenation	Ape	M 0015	
1870-12-10	Charles Spurgeon	No one has succeeded like him in sketching the comic side of repentance and regeneration	Ape	M 0016	
1870-12-17	Sir William Fergusson, 1st Baronet	There is no man of greater weight in his profession	Ape	M 0017	
1870-12-24	Sir Henry Storks	He is a living paradox; no one less subject to control, no one a greater slave of control	Ape	S 070	
1870-12-31	Alexander Mackonochie	He makes religion a tragedy, and the movements of his muscles a solemn ceremony	Ape	M 0018	
1871-01-07	William I of Prussia	Les Mangeoit Pour Soi Refraischir Devant Souper	Coïdé	So 08	
1871-01-14	Count Rudolph Apponyi	One of the lambs of the Political Fold	Ape	S 071	
1871-01-21	John Lawrence, 1st Baron Lawrence	One of the best types of administrative ability in modern times	Ape	S 072	
1871-01-28	Prof Thomas Henry Huxley	A great Med'cine-Man among the Inqui-ring Redskins	Ape	M 0019	
1871-02-04	Konstantinos Mousouros	The most interesting of all the diplomatic corps in London	Ape	S 073	
1871-02-11	William Monsell	The painstaking Irishman	Ape	S 074	
1871-02-18	George Hammond Whalley	The great believer in Roman Catholicism	Ape	S 075	
1871-02-25	Henry Edward Manning, Archbishop of Westminster	The next Pope	Ape	M 0020	
1871-03-04	Carlo Cadorna	A liberal and an enemy of the priests: he fitly represents the Power which has seized Rome and suppressed the Pope	Ape	S 076	
1871-03-11	George Ward Hunt	The fat of the land	Ape	S 077	
1871-03-18	Gerard Noel	A nice little fellow	Ape	S 078	
1871-03-25	Richard Dowse	An Irish wit and Solicitor-General	Ape	S 079	
1871-04-01	George Lyttelton, 4th Baron Lyttelton	A man of position	Ape	S 080	
1871-04-08	Dudley Ryder, 2nd Earl of Harrowby	The last generation	Ape	S 081	
1871-04-15	Robert Grosvenor, 1st Baron Ebury	A common-prayer reformer	Ape	S 082	
1871-04-22	George Phipps, 2nd Marquess of Normanby	By birth a man, by inheritance a Marquis and a Governor by his Sovereign's favour: he fills all his positions with credit	Ape	S 083	
1871-04-29	Sir Francis Grant	An able artist and an excellent President	Ape	M 0021	
1871-05-06	Sir Erskine May	Parliamentary Practice	Ape	M 0022	
1871-05-13	John Everett Millais	A converted pre-Raphaelite	Ape	M 0023	
1871-05-20	Michael Thomas Bass	Beer	Ape	S 084	
1871-05-27	Baron Mayer Amschel de Rothschild	The winner of the race	Ape	S 085	
1871-06-03	Capt Eyre Massey Shaw	He well deserves is popularity	Ape	M 0024	
1871-06-10	Arthur Orton claiming to be Sir Roger Tichborne	Baronet or butcher	Ape	M 0025	
1871-06-17	Algernon Borthwick	The Morning Post	Ape	M 0026	
1871-06-24	William Thomson, Archbishop of York	The Archbishop of Society	Ape	S 086	
1871-07-01	Sir John Shaw-Lefevre	La Reyne le veult	Ape	M 0027	
1871-07-08	John Spencer-Churchill, 7th Duke of Marlborough	A Conservative religionist	Ape	S 087	
1871-07-15	Edward Bootle-Wilbraham, 2nd Baron Skelmersdale	A Conservative whip	Ape	S 088	
1871-07-22	Alfred Tennyson	The Poet Laureate	Ape	M 0028	
1871-07-29	Edward Miall	The Nonconformist	Ape	S 089	
1871-08-05	George Bentinck	Big Ben	Coïdé	S 090	
1871-08-12	John Locke	The only man who is ever known to make Mr Gladstone smile	Coïdé	S 091	
1871-08-19	Henry Cole	King Cole	Coïdé	M 0029	
1871-08-26	Manuel Rances y Villanueva	The Spanish Minister	Coïdé	M 0030	
1871-09-02	João Carlos Saldanha de Oliveira Daun, 1st Duke of Saldanha	He might have been a King	Coïdé	M 0031	
1871-09-09	Russell Gurney	A Commissioner	Coïdé	S 092	
1871-09-16	Charles Manners, 6th Duke of Rutland	He was once offered the leadership of the Conservative Party	Coïdé	S 093	
1871-09-23	George Whyte-Melville	The novelist of Society	Coïdé	M 0032	
1871-09-30	Charles Darwin	Natural Selection	Coïdé	M 0033	
1871-10-07	Alderman Andrew Lusk	Now I want to know	Coïdé	S 094	
1871-10-14	Henry Eaton	Silk	Coïdé	S 095	
1871-10-21	Charles Voysey	I have much to be thankful for	Coïdé	M 0034	
1871-10-28	John Pender	Telegraphs	Coïdé	M 0035	
1871-11-04	Sir Fitzroy Kelly	The Lord Chief Baron	Coïdé	J 05	
1871-11-11	Matthew Arnold	'I say, the critic must keep out of the region of immediate practice'	Coïdé	M 0036	
1871-11-18	Lionel Dawson-Damer	Hippy	Coïdé	S 096	
1871-11-25	Sir Charles Dilke, 2nd Baronet	A far advanced Radical	Coïdé	S 097	
1871-12-02	Alexander Baillie-Cochrane	Judicious Amelioration	Coïdé	S 098	
1871-12-09	A. J. Mundella	Education and Arbitration	Coïdé	S 099	
1871-12-16	John George Dodson	Ways and Means	Coïdé	S 100	
1871-12-23	George Cavendish-Bentinck	Little Ben	Coïdé	S 101	
1871-12-30	William Henry Gregory	An art critic	Coïdé	S 102	
1872-01-06	Adolphe Thiers	Faute-de-mieux Premier	Cecioni	S 103	
1872-01-13	Richard Boyle, 9th Earl of Cork	Master of Her Majesty's Buckhounds	Cecioni	S 104	
1872-01-20	Frederic Quin	Homoeopathic Society	Cecioni	M 0037	
1872-01-27	James Anthony Froude	He created Henry VIII exploded Mary Stuart and demolished Elizabeth	Cecioni	M 0038	
1872-02-03	Wilkie Collins	The Novelist who invented Sensation	Cecioni	M 0039	
1872-02-10	Spencer Horatio Walpole	He defended Hyde Park	Cecioni	S 105	
1872-02-17	John Ruskin	The realisation of the Ideal	Cecioni	M 0040	
1872-02-24	George Glyn	The Whip	Cecioni	S 106	
1872-03-02	Alexander William Kinglake	Not an MP	Cecioni	M 0041	
1872-03-09	W. H. Smith	Newspapers	Cecioni	S 107	
1872-03-16	Sir Roundell Palmer	He refused the Woolsack, and voted against the Disestablishment of the Irish Church	Cecioni	S 108	
1872-03-23	John Maguire	A Home Ruler	Cecioni	S 109	
1872-03-30	Canon Charles Kingsley	The Apostle of the Flesh	Cecioni	M 0042	
1872-04-06	John Tyndall	The Scientific Use of the Imagination	Cecioni	M 0043	
1872-04-13	John Cumming	The End of the World	Cecioni	M 0044	
1872-04-20	Gathorne Hardy	Conservative	Cecioni	S 110	
1872-04-27	William Hepworth Dixon	He discovered New America and Free Russia	Cecioni	M 0045	
1872-05-04	Amadeo I of Spain	He would be a King	Cecioni	So 09	
1872-05-11	Sir Wilfrid Lawson, 2nd Baronet, of Brayton	Permissive Prohibition	Cecioni	S 111	
1872-05-18	Hamilton Fish	Consequential damages	Nast	S 112	
1872-05-25	Charles Sumner	The Massive Grievance	Nast	S 113	
1872-06-01	Gen Ulysses S. Grant	Captain, Tanner, Farmer, General, Imperator	Nast	So 10	
1872-06-08	Thomas Hughes	Tom Brown	Cecioni	S 114	
1872-06-15	Samuel Morley	Dissent	Cecioni	S 115	
1872-06-22	Arthur Wellesley, 2nd Duke of Wellington	The son of Waterloo	Cecioni	S 116	
1872-06-29	Frederic Leighton	A sacrifice to the Graces	Coïdé	M 0046	
1872-07-06	Sir Michael Costa	Orchestration	Lyall	M 0047	
1872-07-13	George Leeman	A Yorkshire Solicitor	Coïdé	S 117	
1872-07-20	Horace Greeley	Anything to beat Grant	Nast	S 118	
1872-07-27	Edward Pleydell-Bouverie	He did not decline the Speakership	Lyall	S 119	
1872-08-03	James Delahunty	Currency	Coïdé	S 120	
1872-08-10	Edward Horsman	the eccentric Liberal	Lyall	S 121	
1872-08-17	Granville Waldegrave, 3rd Baron Radstock	DV	Cecioni	S 122	
1872-08-24	Charles John Vaughan	Nolo episcopari	Montbard	M 0048	
1872-08-31	Charles Pelham Villiers	He advocated Free-trade before it was safe to attack Protection	Coïdé	S 123	
1872-09-07	Thomas John Capel	The Apostle to the Genteel	Montbard	M 0049	
1872-09-14	George Byng, Baron Enfield	Answers questions	Cecioni	S 124	
1872-09-21	Arthur Stanley	Philosophic Belief	Montbard	M 0050	
1872-09-28	Sir Colman O'Loghlen, 2nd Baronet	An Irish Baronet	Cecioni	S 125	
1872-10-05	Charles Francis Adams Sr.	An Arbitrator	Nast	S 126	
1872-10-12	Thomas Binney	The head of the Dissenters	Montbard	M 0051	
1872-10-19	Léon Gambetta	He devoured France with activity	Montbard	S 127	
1872-10-26	Joseph Cowen	Newcastle-on-Tyne	Coïdé	S 128	
1872-11-02	Henry Morton Stanley	He found Livingstone	Montbard	M 0052	
1872-11-09	Sir Sydney Waterlow	The Lord Mayor	Cecioni	M 0053	
1872-11-16	Henry Brand	Mr Speaker	Coïdé	S 129	
1872-11-23	Christopher Newman Hall	Come to Jesus	Montbard	M 0054	
1872-11-30	Roger Eykyn	The Police Champion	Coïdé	S 130	
1872-12-07	Sir Francis Goldsmid, 2nd Baronet	Barrister & Baronet	Coïdé	S 131	
1872-12-14	Baron Paul Reuter	Telegrams	Delfico	M 0055	
1872-12-21	Henry Fawcett	A Radical Leader	Delfico	S 132	
1872-12-28	Gabriel Goldney	Practical	Delfico	S 133	
1873-01-04	William Beauclerk, 10th Duke of St Albans	Hereditary Grand Falconer	Delfico	S 134	
1873-01-11	Robert Wigram Crawford	A man of weight and high standing	Delfico	S 135	
1873-01-18	Charles Gilpin	Capital Punishment	Delfico	S 136	
1873-01-25	Walter Montagu-Douglas-Scott, 5th Duke of Buccleuch	The Governing Classes	D'Épinay	S 137	
1873-02-01	Alan Stewart, 10th Earl of Galloway	Army reorganisation	Delfico	S 138	
1873-02-08	Sir James Bacon	Contempt of Court	WV	J 06	
1873-02-15	Joseph d'Aguilar Samuda	Iron Shipbuilding	Lyall	S 139	
1873-02-22	Sir Jack Kerslake	Jack	Lyall	M 0056	
1873-03-01	Richard Owen	Old Bones	unsigned. Ape ?	M 0057	
1873-03-08	Thomas Mayne Reid	Impossible Romance	Coïdé	M 0058	
1873-03-15	Samuel Plimsoll	The Sailor's Champion	WV	S 140	
1873-03-22	Edward Levy	The Daily Telegraph	Spy	M 0059	
1873-03-29	John Stuart Mill	A Feminine Philosopher	Spy	S 141	
1873-04-05	Anthony Trollope	A Novelist	Spy	M 0060	
1873-04-12	Lt-Col Lord Charles Russell	'This fell sergeant – strict in this arrest'	Coïdé	M 0061	
1873-04-19	Thomas Emerson Headlam	Has kept his seat for six-and-twenty years	Spy	S 142	
1873-04-26	Sir William Jenner, 1st Baronet	Physic	Spy	M 0062	
1873-05-03	Isaac Butt	Home Rule	Spy	S 143	
1873-05-10	William Powell Frith	The Derby-Day	Spy	M 0063	
1873-05-17	John Laird	He built the 'Alabama' and the 'Captain'	Spy	S 144	
1873-05-24	Sir John Mellor	Judges The Claimant	Spy	J 07	
1873-05-31	Robert Lush	A little lush	Spy	J 08	
1873-06-07	Robert Dalglish	The most popular man in the House of Commons	Spy	S 145	
1873-06-14	Sir Watkin Williams-Wynn, 6th Baronet	The King of Wales	Spy	S 146	
1873-06-21	Henry Hawkins	The Tichborne Case	Spy	M 0064	
1873-06-28	Washington Hibbert	A Londoner	Coïdé	M 0065	
1873-07-05	Naser al-Din Shah Qajar	He Endowed Persia with a National Debt	Spy	So 11	
1873-07-12	Sir Henry Rawlinson	Our Eastern Policy	Spy	S 147	
1873-07-19	Sir Richard Airey	Adjutant-General of the Forces	Spy	M 0066	
1873-07-26	Charles Colville,, 10th Lord Colville of Culross	A good fellow	Spy	S 148	
1873-08-02	George Trevelyan	The Competition Wallah	Spy	S 149	
1873-08-09	Lord Otho FitzGerald	A Message from the Queen	Spy	S 150	
1873-08-16	Samuel Laing	The infant Samuel	Spy	S 151	
1873-08-23	Thomas Egerton, 2nd Earl of Wilton	The Commodore	Coïdé	S 152	
1873-08-30	Sir William Maynard Gomm	The Constable of the Tower	Spy	M 0067	
1873-09-06	Thomas Collins	Noisy Tom	Spy	S 153	
1873-09-13	Duncan McNeill, 1st Baron Colonsay	Scotch Law	Spy	S 154	
1873-09-20	Sir Henry Bartle Frere	The Slave Trade	Spy	M 0068	
1873-09-27	Sir Julius Benedict	Sweet sounds	Spy	M 0069	
1873-10-04	William Campbell, 2nd Baron Stratheden and Campbell	and Stratheden	Spy	S 155	
1873-10-11	Sir Augustus Clifford, 1st Baronet	Black Rod	Spy	M 0070	
1873-10-18	William Douglas-Hamilton, 12th Duke of Hamilton	Premier Peer of Scotland	Coïdé	S 156	
1873-10-25	Charles Stanhope, 7th Earl of Harrington	An unexpected Earl	Coïdé	S 157	
1873-11-01	Edward Vaughan Hyde Kenealy	The Claimant's Counsel	Spy	M 0071	
1873-11-08	Albert Edward, Prince of Wales	The Prince	Coïdé	P 01	
1873-11-15	Col James McGarel-Hogg	Board of Works	Spy	S 158	
1873-11-22	William Bathurst, 5th Earl Bathurst	A Relic	Coïdé	S 159	
1873-11-29	Sir Richard Wallace, 1st Baronet	The Hertford Property	Spy	S 160	
1873-12-06	Sir John Doran	Notes and Queries	Spy	M 0072	
1873-12-13	Sjt John Humffreys Parry	a lawyer	Spy	M 0073	
1873-12-20	Edward Matthew Ward	Historic Art	Spy	M 0074	
1873-12-27	Percy William Doyle	Diplomacy	Coïdé	M 0075	
1874-01-03	Augustus William Lumley-Savile	Cotillon	Ape	M 0076	
1874-01-10	Prince Alfred, Duke of Edinburgh	First Violin	Ape	P 02	
1874-01-17	Sir Anthony Panizzi	Books	Ape	M 0077	
1874-01-24	Sir George Orby Wombwell, 4th Baronet	Our Sir George	Ape	M 0078	
1874-01-31	William Cuffe, 4th Earl of Desart	Chesterfield Letters	Ape	M 0079	
1874-02-07	Charles Wyn-Carington, 3rd Baron Carrington	Charlie	Ape	S 161	
1874-02-14	James Johnstone	The Standard	Ape	M 0080	
1874-02-21	Albert Grant	Leicester Square	Ape	S 162	
1874-02-28	John Walter Huddleston	A future Judge	Ape	S 163	
1874-03-07	Sir Henry James	Nervous	Ape	S 164	
1874-03-14	Arthur Sullivan	English Music	Ape	M 0081	
1874-03-21	Capt Ralph Allen Gossett	Popular Members	Ape	M 0082; Serjeant-at-Arms	
1874-03-28	Sir Charles Forster, 1st Baronet	An Amateur Whip	Ape	S 165	
1874-04-04	Henry Petty-Fitzmaurice, 5th Marquess of Lansdowne	Family	Ape	S 166	
1874-04-11	John Arthur Roebuck	Tear 'em	Ape	S 167	
1874-04-18	Sir Garnet Wolseley, 1st Baronet	The man who won't stop	Ape	M 0083	
1874-04-25	J. W. Henley	Common Sense	Ape	S 168	
1874-05-02	Sir William Vesey-FitzGerald	Bombay	Ape	S 169	
1874-05-09	Charles Yorke, 5th Earl of Hardwicke	High Political Office	Ape	S 170	
1874-05-16	R. A. Cross	The new man	Ape	S 171	
1874-05-23	Philip Stanhope, 5th Earl Stanhope	A Noble Writer	Ape	S 172	
1874-05-30	William Mansfield, 1st Baron Sandhurst	Military advice	Ape	S 173	
1874-06-06	William Cavendish, 7th Duke of Devonshire	Position	Ape	S 174	
1874-06-13	John Thynne, 4th Marquess of Bath	Ancient lineage	Ape	S 175	
1874-06-20	Vittorio Emanuele Taparelli d'Azeglio	Il Marchese	Ape	M 0084	
1874-06-27	William Patrick Adam	The Past	Ape	S 176	
1874-07-04	Col Thomas Edward Taylor	Lately whipped	Ape	S 177	
1874-07-11	Francis Russell, 9th Duke of Bedford	The head of the Russells	Ape	S 178	
1874-07-18	Herbert Praed	The Philanthropist	Ape	S 179	
1874-07-25	James Harris, 3rd Earl of Malmesbury	Diplomacy	Ape	S 180	
1874-08-01	Sir Henry Thompson, 1st Baronet	Cremation	Ape	M 0085	
1874-08-08	George Sclater-Booth	The safe man	Ape	S 181	
1874-08-15	Sir Arthur Helps	Council	Ape	M 0086	
1874-08-22	Sir Michael Hicks-Beach, 9th Baronet	A scagliola apollo	Ape	S 182	
1874-08-29	Rowland Winn	the lash	Ape	S 183	
1874-09-05	Sir Henry Drummond Wolff	Consular chaplains	Ape	S 184	
1874-09-12	Oscar Clayton	Fashionable surgery	Ape	M 0087	
1874-09-19	Count Edmund Batthyany	Yachting	Ape	M 0088	
1874-09-26	Sir James Hudson	Ill-used	Ape	S 185	
1874-10-03	Stephen Cave	Amends	Ape	S 186	
1874-10-10	Edward Gordon	Lord Advocate	Ape	S 187	
1874-10-17	James Augustus Hessey	Merchant Taylors	Ape	M 0089	
1874-10-24	Orlando Bridgeman, 3rd Earl of Bradford	Master of the Horse	Ape	S 188	
1874-10-31	James Lloyd Ashbury	The Ocean Race	Ape	S 189	
1874-11-07	Henry Labouchère	Modest assurance	Ape	M 0090	
1874-11-14	Christopher Sykes	the Gull's friend	Ape	S 190	
1874-11-21	Algernon Charles Swinburne	Before sunrise	Ape	M 0091	
1874-11-28	John William Colenso	the Pentateuch	Ape	M 0092	
1874-12-05	Henry Chaplin	A turf reformer	Ape	S 191	
1874-12-12	Lord William Hay	The Director	Ape	M 0093	
1874-12-19	Henry Irving	The Bells	Ape		
1874-12-26	Henry White	Prayers	Ape	M 0094	

Next List of Vanity Fair (British magazine) caricatures (1875–1879)
