= List of Vanity Fair (British magazine) caricatures (1875–1879) =

<< List of Vanity Fair caricatures (1870–1874) >> List of Vanity Fair caricatures (1880–1884)

The following is from a list of caricatures published 1875-1879 by the British magazine Vanity Fair (1868–1914).

Publication date	Subject	Caption	Caricaturist	Notes	Pic.
1875-01-02	Edward Bouverie Pusey	High Church	Ape	M 0095	
1875-01-09	Sir William Fraser, 4th Baronet	The Sanitary	Ape	S 192	
1875-01-16	William Howard Russell	Our War correspondence	Ape	M 0096	
1875-01-23	Gen Robert C. Schenck	The United States	Ape	S 193	
1875-01-30	Henry Liddell	Christchurch	Ape	M 0097	
1875-02-06	Max Müller	The science of language	Ape	M 0098	
1875-02-13	Count Pyotr Andreyevich Shuvalov	Russia	Ape	S 194	
1875-02-20	Lyon Playfair	Chemistry	Ape	S 195	
1875-02-27	John Freeman-Mitford, 2nd Baron Redesdale	the Lord Dictator	Ape	S 196	
1875-03-06	Lt-Col Edmund Henderson	Police	Ape	M 0099	
1875-03-13	Maj Purcell O'Gorman	The joker for Waterford	Ape	S 197	
1875-03-20	Edward James Reed	Naval Construction	Ape	S 198	
1875-03-27	John Pope Hennessy	Colonial Government	Ape	M 0100	
1875-04-03	Dwight L. Moody	Prayer and Praise	Ape	M 0101	
1875-04-10	Ira D. Sankey	Praise and Prayer	Ape	M 0102	
1875-04-17	Henry Cecil Raikes	Order, order	Ape	S 199	
1875-04-24	Sir George Jenkinson, 11th Baronet	The Colossus of Roads	Ape	S 200	
1875-05-01	William Keppel, Viscount Bury	The auxiliary Forces	Ape	M 0103	
1875-05-08	Michel Chevalier	French Free Trade	Ape	S 201	
1875-05-15	Sir Massey Lopes, 3rd Baronet	Local Taxation	Ape	S 202	
1875-05-22	Tommaso Salvini	Othello	Ape	M 0104	
1875-05-29	Richard Temple-Nugent-Brydges-Chandos-Grenville, 3rd Duke of Buckingham and Chandos	a safe Duke	Ape	S 203	
1875-06-05	Clare Sewell Read	A tenant Farmer	Ape	S 204	
1875-06-12	Sir John Dalrymple-Hay, 3rd Baronet	The retired list	Ape	S 205	
1875-06-19	Edmund Hammond, 1st Baron Hammond	Foreign Policy	Ape	S 206	
1875-06-26	William Nevill, 5th Earl of Abergavenny	The Tory bloodhound	Ape	S 207	
1875-07-03	Maj-Gen Lord Alfred Paget	The Clerk Marshal	Ape	M 0105	
1875-07-10	Sir Henry Stracey, 5th Baronet	A country gentleman	Ape	M 0106	
1875-07-17	Frederick Milbank	Yorkshire	Ape	S 208	
1875-07-24	Guildford Onslow	The Claimant's Friend	Ape	M 0107	
1875-07-31	John Rous, 2nd Earl of Stradbroke	Suffolk	Ape	S 209	
1875-08-07	Philip Henry Muntz	Birmingham	Ape	S 210	
1875-08-14	Edward Montagu-Stuart-Wortley-Mackenzie, 3rd Baron Wharncliffe	Conservative Conversion	Ape	S 211	
1875-08-21	Sir Thomas Bazley, 1st Baronet	Manchester	Ape	S 212	
1875-08-28	Count Friedrich Ferdinand von Beust	Austria	Ape	M 0108	
1875-09-04	William Hart Dyke	a whipper	Ape	S 213	
1875-09-11	George Barrington, 7th Viscount Barrington MP	a young man	Ape	S 214	
1875-09-18	George Payne	GP	Ape	M 0109	
1875-09-25	George Augustus Sala	Journalism	Ape	M 0110	
1875-10-02	Charles James Mathews	Our only Comedian	Ape	M 0111	
1875-10-09	Matthew Webb	Swam the Channel	Ape	M 0112	
1875-10-16	George Weld-Forester, 3rd Baron Forester	The ex-Father of the House	Ape	S 215	
1875-10-23	Rear-Adm Lord John Hay	An Admiral	Ape	M 0113	
1875-10-30	Prince Edward of Saxe-Weimar	Guards	Ape	M 0114	
1875-11-06	Sir Edward Watkin	The Railway Interest	Ape	S 216	
1875-11-13	Sir George Biddell Airy	Astronomy	Ape	M 0115	
1875-11-20	Robert Browning	Modern Poetry	Ape	M 0116	
1875-11-27	Abraham Hayward	Anecdotes	Ape	M 0117	
1875-12-04	Spencer Lyttelton	Marshall of the Ceremonies	Ape	M 0118	
1875-12-11	Sir Richard Baggallay	The Court of Appeal	Ape	J 09	
1875-12-18	Sir William Gull, 1st Baronet	Physiological Physic	Ape	M 0119	
1875-12-25	Adm Lord Clarence Paget	Sailor politician and sculptor	Ape	M 0120	
1876-01-01	Sir William Brett	Popular Judgement	Ape	J 10	
1876-01-08	George Hay, 8th Marquess of Tweeddale	Peninsular Veteran	Ape	S 217	
1876-01-15	Arthur Kinnaird, 10th Lord Kinnaird	Piety and Banking	Ape	S 218	
1876-01-22	Charles Old Goodford	Goody	Spy	M 0121	
1876-01-29	Sir George Wilshere	The Exchequer	Spy	J 11	
1876-02-05	Sir Anthony Cleasby	Formerly of the Carlton	Spy	J 12	
1876-02-12	Sir James Paget, 1st Baronet	Surgery	Spy	M 0122	
1876-02-19	Lionel Lawson	Prosperity	JTJ	M 0123	
1876-02-26	Benjamin Jowett	Greek	Spy	M 0124	
1876-03-04	Henry Louis Bischoffsheim	a retired Financier	JTJ	M 0125	
1876-03-11	Tom Taylor	Punch	Spy	M 0126	
1876-03-18	Robert Bulwer-Lytton, 2nd Baron Lytton	the Vice-Empress	Spy	S 219	
1876-03-25	Gen Sir Frederick Haines	Commander in chief in India	JTJ	M 0127	
1876-04-01	Maj-Gen James Macdonald	Jim	JTJ	M 0128	
1876-04-08	Gerald Wellesley	The old Dean	Spy	M 0129	
1876-04-15	George Byng, 7th Viscount Torrington	A man of the world	Spy	S 220	
1876-04-22	Adm Sir Henry Keppel	Little Harry	JTJ	M 0130	
1876-04-29	Carlos, Duke of Madrid	Legitimacy	Spy	P 03	
1876-05-06	William Brodrick, 8th Viscount Midleton	Steward	Spy	S 221	
1876-05-13	Marcus Beresford	Southwark	Spy	S 222	
1876-05-20	Robert Jocelyn, 4th Earl of Roden	In waiting	Spy	S 223	
1876-05-27	Edward Herbert, 3rd Earl of Powis	Mouldy	Spy	S 224	
1876-06-03	Archibald Primrose, 5th Earl of Rosebery	Horses	Spy	S 225	
1876-06-10	Henry Liddell, Baron Eslington	Shipping	Spy	S 226	
1876-06-17	Prince Arthur, Duke of Connaught and Strathearn	a future Commander-in-Chief	Spy	P 04	
1876-06-24	Henry Arthur Herbert	of Muckross	Spy	S 227	
1876-07-01	Isaac Newton Wallop, 5th Earl of Portsmouth	Horseflesh	Spy	S 228	
1876-07-08	Henry Sturt, 1st Baron Alington	Bunny	Spy	S 229	
1876-07-15	Lieutenant Verney Lovett Cameron	He walked across Africa	Spy	M 0131	
1876-07-22	Thomas Fremantle, 1st Baron Cottesloe	Customs	Spy	S 230	
1876-07-29	John Lawrence Toole	A Spelling Bee	Spy	M 0132	
1876-08-05	James Manby Gully	Hydropathy	Spy	M 0133	
1876-08-12	Lord Charles Beresford	The little rascal	Spy	S 231	
1876-08-19	Charles Vivian, 2nd Baron Vivian	Hook & eye	Spy	S 232	
1876-08-26	Col James Farquharson of Invercauld	The Queen's Landlord	JTJ	M 0134	
1876-09-02	George Lewis	An astute lawyer	Spy	M 0135	
1876-09-09	Adm F. B. Paget-Seymour	The swell of the Ocean	Spy	M 0136	
1876-09-16	Henry Liddon	High Church	Spy	M 0137	
1876-09-23	Archibald Hay, Viscount Dupplin	Petrarch	Spy	M 0138	
1876-09-30	Henry Somerset, 8th Duke of Beaufort	the Duke of Sport	Spy	S 233	
1876-10-07	Lowry Cole, Viscount Cole	Good Looks	Spy	M 0139	
1876-10-14	Mir Turab Ali Khan, Salar Jung I	An Indian Statesman	Spy	S 234	
1876-10-21	George I of Greece	Greece	Spy	So 12	
1876-10-28	Francis Needham, Viscount Newry And Mourie	amateur theatricals	Spy	M 0140	
1876-11-04	Col Robert Loyd-Lindsay	The Victoria and Geneva crosses	Spy	S 235	
1876-11-11	George Vane-Tempest, 5th Marquess of Londonderry	the vice-commodore	Spy	S 236	
1876-11-18	Maj-Gen Sir Sir Henry de Bathe, 4th Baronet	Henry	Spy	M 0141	
1876-11-25	Col Charles Napier Sturt	a younger son	Spy	M 0142; brother of Lord Alington	
1876-12-02	Capt Frederick Gustavus Burnaby	Fred	Spy	M 0143	
1876-12-09	Thomas Baring, 1st Earl of Northbrook	British Rule in India	Spy	S 237	
1876-12-16	Alexander Duff, Viscount Macduff	an elder son	Spy	S 238	
1876-12-23	Count George Herbert Munster	the German Ambassador	Spy	S 239	
1876-12-30	Sir George Mellish	appeals	Spy	J 13	
1877-01-06	Count Gyula Andrássy	Hungary in effigy	Kluz	S 240	
1877-01-13	Valentine Cameron Prinsep	Val	Spy	M 0144	
1877-01-20	John Henry Newman	Tracts for the times	Spy	M 0145	
1877-01-27	Joseph Chamberlain	our Joe	Spy	S 241	
1877-02-03	Lt-Gen Sir Alfred Horsford	The Beau ideal	Spy	M 0146	
1877-02-10	Arthur Tooth	The Christian Martyr	Spy	M 0147	
1877-02-17	Robert Richardson-Gardner	The Royal Borough	Spy	S 242	
1877-02-24	John Paulet, 14th Marquess of Winchester	the premier Marquess	Spy	S 243	
1877-03-03	Montagu Corry	The pattern Private Secretary	Spy	M 0148	
1877-03-10	Lord Claud Hamilton	The Dowager	Spy	S 244	
1877-03-17	Sir Henry Elliot	Ambassador to the Porte	Spy	S 245	
1877-03-24	Dudley Carleton, 4th Baron Dorchester	The Turf	Spy	S 246	
1877-03-31	Thomas Taylour, 3rd Marquess of Headfort	An Irish Property	Spy	S 247	
1877-04-07	Francis Seymour, 5th Marquess of Hertford	The Lord Chamberlain	Spy	S 248	
1877-04-14	Gen Nikolay Pavlovich Ignatyev	a manipulator of phrases	Spy	S 249	
1877-04-21	Prince Leopold	The student Prince	Spy	P 05	
1877-04-28	Robert Bourke	Bobby	Spy	S 250	
1877-05-05	Jacob Bright	the Apostle to the Women	Spy	S 251	
1877-05-12	William Bromley-Davenport	Clever	Spy	S 252	
1877-05-19	Richard Wagner	The Music of the future	Spy	M 0149	
1877-05-26	Lord Henry Thynne	younger son	Spy	S 253	
1877-06-02	Thomas Bayley Potter	the Manchester school	Spy	S 254	
1877-06-09	W. G. Grace	Cricket	Spy	M 0150	
1877-06-16	Guo Songtao	China	Spy	S 255	
1877-06-23	Adm Sir Hastings Yelverton	Spanish Ironclads	Spy	M 0151	
1877-06-30	Midhat Pasha	The Turkish Constitution	Spy	S 256	
1877-07-07	Theodore Martin	The Royal Literary assistant	Spy	M 0152	
1877-07-14	Louis-Napoléon, Prince Imperial	The Empire	Spy	P 06	
1877-07-21	Joseph Biggar	Irish obstruction	Spy	S 257	
1877-07-28	Lord Odo Russell	Odo	Spy	M 0153	
1877-08-04	Harry Powlett, 4th Duke of Cleveland	the fourth Duke	Spy	S 258	
1877-08-11	Sir Francis Seymour, 1st Baronet	Albert's Seymour	Ape	M 0154	
1877-08-18	Lord Ronald Gower	a sculptor	Spy	M 0155	
1877-08-25	Gen Sir William Knollys	Black Rod	Ape	M 0156	
1877-09-01	Evelyn Boscawen, 6th Viscount Falmouth	Never bets	Spy	S 259	
1877-09-08	Henry Villebois	The Squire	Ape	M 0157; High Sheriff of Norfolk	
1877-09-15	Gustave Doré	sensational art	Spy	M 0158	
1877-09-22	Baron Lionel de Rothschild	Baron Lionel	Ape	M 0159	
1877-09-29	Harry Benson	the Turf Frauds	Spy	M 0160	
1877-10-06	Thomas Brassey	Round the World	Ape	S 260	
1877-10-13	Gen Lord George Paget	a soldier	Spy	M 0161	
1877-10-20	Gen Sir Charles Ellice	the Adjutant General	Ape	M 0162	
1877-10-27	Henry Steel	the leviathan	Spy	M 0163	
1877-11-03	Oliver George Paulett Montagu	Oliver	Ape	M 0164	
1877-11-10	John Douglas, 9th Marquess of Queensberry	a good light weight	Spy	S 261	
1877-11-17	Sir John Dugdale Astley, 3rd Baronet	the Mate	Spy	S 262	
1877-11-24	Sir Francis Doyle, 2nd Baronet	Poetry	Spy	M 0165	
1877-12-01	Sir Lintorn Simmons	Fortifications	Ape	M 0166	
1877-12-08	James Lowther	Jim	Spy	S 263	
1877-12-15	Sir Allen Young	Alleno	Ape	M 0167	
1877-12-22	John Mackenzie Grieve	Haute école	Spy	M 0168	
1877-12-29	Franz Joseph I of Austria	Austria	Sue	So 13	
1878-01-05	Archibald Forbes	Thorough	Ape	M 0169	
1878-01-12	James Abbott McNeill Whistler	a symphony	Spy	M 0170	
1878-01-19	Col Owen Lewis Cope Williams	The Prince	Ape	M 0171	
1878-01-26	Spencer Cecil Brabazon Ponsonby-Fane	Spencer	Spy	M 0172	
1878-02-02	Sir Charles Russell, 3rd Baronet	Westminster	Ape	S 264	
1878-02-09	Sir John Holker	Attorney-General	Spy	S 265	
1878-02-16	Lord Edmond Fitzmaurice	Calne	Spy	S 266	
1878-02-23	Sir John Lubbock, 4th Baronet	The Bank Holiday	Spy	S 267	
1878-03-02	Rudolph Feilding, 8th Earl of Denbigh	a Catholic	Ape	S 268	
1878-03-09	Lt-Gen Valentine Baker	Baker Pasha	Ape	M 0173	
1878-03-16	Gen Frederick Marshall	Handsome Fred	Ape	M 0174	
1878-03-23	Gen Sir Charles Hastings Doyle	A General	Spy	M 0175	
1878-03-30	William Duncombe, 1st Earl of Feversham	a Conservative	Ape	S 269	
1878-04-06	Richard Lyons, 2nd Baron Lyons	Diplomacy	Ape	S 270	
1878-04-13	Maj-Gen Sir Daniel Lysons	Dan	Spy	M 0176	
1878-04-20	Gen Lord Robert Napier, 1st Baron Napier of Magdala	The British Expedition	Spy	M 0177	
1878-04-27	Joseph Cowen	Joe	Spy	S 271	
1878-05-04	Windham Wyndham-Quin, 4th Earl of Dunraven and Mount-Earl	active	Ape	S 272	
1878-05-11	James Lindsay, Lord Lindsay	Astronomy	Spy	S 273	
1878-05-18	Pope Leo XIII	The Pope	T	So 14	
1878-05-25	Col Frederick Arthur Wellesley	Promotion by merit	Ape	M 0178	
1878-06-01	Adm Augustus Charles Hobart-Hampden	Hobart Pasha	Spy	M 0179	
1878-06-08	Lt-Gen Sir Arnold Burrowes Kemball	Asia Minor	Ape	M 0180	
1878-06-15	Gen Giuseppe Garibaldi	Revolution	T	M 0181	
1878-06-22	Sir Harding Giffard	the Solicitor-General	Spy	S 274	
1878-06-29	George Sackville Frederick Lane-Fox of Bramham	George Fox	Spy	M 0182	
1878-07-02	Benjamin Disraeli, Earl of Beaconsfield	the junior Ambassador	Ape	SS	
1878-07-02	St James's Street – June 1878	St James Street – June 1878	Whistler	SS	
1878-07-06	Sir James Dalrymple-Horn-Elphinstone, 2nd Baronet	the Admiral	Spy	S 275	
1878-07-13	Fred Spofforth	The Demon Bowler	Spy	M 0183	
1878-07-20	Gen Sir Thomas Montagu Steele	Aldershot	Ape	M 0184	
1878-07-27	Lord Claud Hamilton	Bridegroom	Spy	S 276	
1878-08-03	Umberto I of Italy	Italy	T	So 15	
1878-08-10	Col John North	a Tory	Spy	S 277	
1878-08-17	Charles Abbott, 3rd Baron Tenterden	The Foreign Office	Ape	S 278	
1878-08-24	Henry Dawson-Damer, 3rd Earl of Portarlington	Port	Spy	S 279	
1878-08-31	Edward Jenkins	Ginx's Baby	Spy	S 280	
1878-09-07	William Edwardes, 4th Baron Kensington	a Whip	Spy	S 281	
1878-09-14	William Wentworth-Fitzwilliam, 6th Earl Fitzwilliam	Property and Principle	Ape	S 282	
1878-09-21	Sir George Campbell	Indian authority	Spy	S 283	
1878-09-28	William Henry Waddington	France at the Congress	T	S 284	
1878-10-05	Robert Gerard, 1st Baron Gerard	a new peer	Spy	S 285	
1878-10-12	James Butler, 3rd Marquess of Ormonde	Kilkenny	Spy	S 286	
1878-10-19	William Denison, 2nd Baron Londesborough	a whip	Spy	S 287	
1878-10-26	John Tenniel	Punch	Spy	M 0185	
1878-11-02	Alfred Montgomery	Alfred	Spy	M 0186	
1878-11-09	Charles Rivers Wilson	Egyptian Finance	Ape	M 0187	
1878-11-16	Edmund Yates	The World	Spy	M 0188	
1878-11-23	Sir Philip Cunliffe-Owen	Paris Exhibition	Spy	M 0189	
1878-11-30	John Morley	The Fortnightly Review	Ape	M 0190	
1878-12-07	Sir Frederick Johnstone, 8th Baronet	Freddy	Spy	S 288	
1878-12-14	Charles Murray, 7th Earl of Dunmore	Charlie	Spy	S 289	
1878-12-14	Albert Edward, Prince of Wales		Spy		
1878-12-21	Charles Seely	Pigs	Spy	S 290	
1878-12-28	William Montagu, 7th Duke of Manchester	the Colonies	Spy	S 291	
1879-01-04	Bret Harte	the Heathen Chinee	Spy	M 0191	
1879-01-11	William Bateman-Hanbury, 2nd Baron Bateman	Reciprocity	Ape	S 292	
1879-01-18	Sir George Bowyer, 7th Baronet	the Knight of Malta	Spy	S 293	
1879-01-25	Peter Rylands	Foreign Policy	Spy	S 294	
1879-02-01	Charles Gounod	Emotional Music	T	M 0192	
1879-02-08	Arthur Otway	He killed the cat	Ape	S 295	
1879-02-15	Giuseppe Verdi	Italian Music	T	M 0193	
1879-02-22	Ernest Renan	La vie de Jésus	T	M 0194	
1879-03-01	Sir George Jessel	The Law	Spy	M 0195	
1879-03-08	Adm Sir Sir William Edmonstone, 4th Baronet	Chorus	Spy	S 296	
1879-03-15	Maj-Gen Henry Hope Crealock	Second in Zululand	Spy	M 0196	
1879-03-22	Lawrence Alma-Tadema	Ancient Painting	Ape	M 0197	
1879-03-29	Maj-Gen Sir Henry Havelock	The soldier who couldn't draw his sword	Spy	S 297	
1879-04-05	Lord George Hamilton	Georgie	Spy	S 298	
1879-04-12	Edward Stanhope	The young man	Spy	S 299	
1879-04-19	Mitchell Henry	Home Rule	Spy	S 300	
1879-04-26	Herbert Spencer	Philosophy	CG	M 0198	
1879-05-03	Charles Harbord, 5th Baron Suffield	Charlie	Ape	S 301	
1879-05-10	Douglas Straight	the new Judge	Spy	M 0199	
1879-05-17	George Osborne Morgan	Burials	Spy	S 302	
1879-05-24	Frederick Stanley	War	Ape	S 303	
1879-05-31	Sir Philip Miles, 2nd Baronet	Philip	Spy	S 304	
1879-06-07	Charles Vane-Tempest-Stewart, Viscount Castlereagh MP	C	Spy	S 305	
1879-06-14	St George Lowther, 4th Earl of Lonsdale	Self-conquest	Spy	S 306	
1879-06-21	John Farley Leith	Aberdeen	Spy	S 307	
1879-06-28	Charles Watkin Williams-Wynn	Montgomeryshire	Spy	S 308	
1879-07-01	The Row in the Season	English Society in Hyde Park	Corbold	SS; the Prince and Princess of Wales and other riders in Hyde Park; double print	
1879-07-01	William Ewart Gladstone	The people's William	Spy	SS	
1879-07-05	Sarah Bernhardt	Sarah Bernhardt	TC	W 1; her signature in facsimile	
1879-07-12	Jules Grévy	the French Republic	T	S 309	
1879-07-19	William Holman Hunt	The Pre-Raphaelite of the World	Spy	M 0200	
1879-07-26	Prince Napoléon-Jérôme Bonaparte	Plon-Plon	T	P 08	
1879-08-02	William Brooks	The Golden Pippen	Spy	S 310	
1879-08-09	John Beresford, 5th Marquess of Waterford	The Great Man of Waterford	Spy	S 311	
1879-08-16	Sir Albert Sassoon	The Indian Rothschild	Spy	M 0201	
1879-08-23	Sir Tatton Sykes, 5th Baronet	fifteen churches	Spy	M 0202	
1879-08-30	Reginald Sackville, 7th Earl De La Warr	Jour de ma vie	Spy	S 312	
1879-09-06	Maj-Gen Charles Craufurd Fraser	Conspicuous & cool	Spy	M 0203	
1879-09-13	Phya Bhaskarawongse	Siam	Spy	S 313	
1879-09-20	Victor Hugo	a French Poet	T	M 0204	
1879-09-27	Lord William Beresford	fighting Bill	Spy	M 0205	
1879-10-04	Thomas Chenery	The Times	Spy	M 0206	
1879-10-11	Patrice de Mac-Mahon, Duke of Magenta	J'y suis j'y reste	T	S 314	
1879-10-18	Francis Byng	Prayers	Spy	M 0207	
1879-10-25	John Hely-Hutchinson, 5th Earl of Donoughmore	Eastern Roumelia	Spy	S 315	
1879-11-01	Montagu Williams	In his military capacity	Spy	M 0208	
1879-11-08	John Stewart-Murray, 7th Duke of Atholl	the seventh Duke	Spy	S 316	
1879-11-15	Brig-Gen Sir Evelyn Wood	the Flying Column	Spy	M 0209	
1879-11-22	William Stuart Stirling-Crawfurd	Gang forward	Spy	M 0210	
1879-11-29	Sir George Elliot, 1st Baronet	Geordie	Spy	S 317	
1879-12-06	Paul Adolphe Marie Prosper Granier de Cassagnac	a French duellist	T	S 318	
1879-12-13	Sir Percy Florence Shelley, 3rd Baronet	The Poet's Son	Ape	M 0211	
1879-12-16	Benjamin Disraeli, Earl of Beaconsfield and M. W. Corry	Power and Place	Spy	WS	
1879-12-20	Louis Blanc	social revolution	T	S 319	
1879-12-27	Alexandre Dumas, fils	French Fiction	T	M 0212	

Next List of Vanity Fair (British magazine) caricatures (1880-1884)
