= List of Vanity Fair (British magazine) caricatures (1868–1869) =

>> List of Vanity Fair caricatures (1870–1874)

The following is from a list of caricatures published 1868–69 by the British magazine Vanity Fair (1868–1914).

Publication Date	Subject	Caption	Caricaturist	Notes	Pic.
1869-01-30	Benjamin Disraeli	He educated the Tories and dished the Whigs to pass Reform, but to have become what he is from what he was is the greatest Reform of all	Singe	S 001	
1869-02-06	William Ewart Gladstone	Were he a worse man, he would be a better statesman	Singe	S 002	
1869-02-13	John Bright	Will the sentimental orator be lost in the practical Minister, or will both be extinguished?	Ape	S 003	
1869-02-20	Mary Ann Starr	I felt very uncomfortable	Ape	Pe 1; late Mother Superior of the Convent at Hull	
1869-02-27	Robert Lowe	An enemy to democracy, yet a professor of liberal principles, which tend to democracy; the combination will one day make him Prime Minister of England.	Ape	S 004	
1869-03-06	William Edward Forster	If he is not an advanced liberal, it is for want of advancing himself	Ape	S 005	
1869-03-13	Granville Leveson-Gower, 2nd Earl Granville	The ablest professor in the cabinet of the tact by which power is kept: it is his mission to counteract the talk by which it is won and lost	Ape	S 006	
1869-03-20	William Wood, 1st Baron Hatherley	When he who has too little piety is impossible, and he who has too much is impracticable; he who has equal piety and ability becomes Lord Chancellor	Ape	S 007	
1869-03-27	Spencer Cavendish, Marquess of Hartington	His ability and industry would deserve respect even in a man; in a Marquis they command admiration	Ape	S 008	
1869-04-03	Edward Cardwell	If the State is happy that has no history, thrice happy is the Statesman who makes none	Ape	S 009	
1869-04-10	James Stansfeld	Pour encourager les autres	Ape	S 010	
1869-04-17	George Campbell, 8th Duke of Argyll	God bless the Duke of Argyll	Ape	S 011	
1869-04-24	George Villiers, 4th Earl of Clarendon	To say that he is the best foreign minister in the country is not much as foreign ministers go; but as times go it is a great deal	Ape	S 012	
1869-05-01	John Sidney, 3rd Viscount Sydney	He received the Royal Commands and lengthened the skirts of the Ballet	Ape	S 013	
1869-05-08	Henry Grey, 3rd Earl Grey	A privileged person	Ape	S 014	
1869-05-15	Richard Bethell, 1st Baron Westbury	An eminent Christian man	Ape	S 015	
1869-05-22	George Robinson, 3rd Earl de Grey and 2nd Earl of Ripon	Qualis ab inepto	Ape	S 016	
1869-05-29	Edward Smith-Stanley, 14th Earl of Derby	It is his mission to stem the tide of democracy	Ape	S 017	
1869-06-05	John Russell, 1st Earl Russell	The greatest liberal statesman of modern times	Ape	S 018	
1869-06-12	George Goschen	The Theory of Foreign Exchanges	Ape	S 019	
1869-06-19	Hugh Childers	A returned colonist	Ape	S 020	
1869-06-26	Edward Stanley, Baron Stanley	He speaks with one party and acts with the other	Ape	S 021	
1869-07-03	William Connor Magee, Bishop of Peterborough	If eloquence could justify injustice, he would have saved the Irish Church	Ape	S 022	
1869-07-10	Robert Gascoyne-Cecil, 3rd Marquess of Salisbury	He is too honest a Tory for his party and his time	Ape	S 023	
1869-07-17	John Wodehouse, 1st Earl of Kimberley	He improves, if possible, but he accepts always the accomplished fact	Ape	S 024	
1869-07-24	Samuel Wilberforce, Bishop of Oxford	Not a brawler	Ape	S 025	
1869-07-31	Huugh Cairns, 1st Baron Cairns	When Birth cannot lead Brains must	Ape	S 026	
1869-08-07	Edward Seymour, 12th Duke of Somerset	Proud and sincere, yet liberal and just, he refused to serve under the most humble of Premiers	Ape	S 027	
1869-08-14	Chichester Fortescue	He married Lady Waldegrave and governed Ireland	Ape	S 028	
1869-08-21	Henry Bruce	He has gained credit by converting himself to the Ballot; he would gain greater credit by converting himself into an ex-secretary of State for the Home Department	Ape	S 029	
1869-08-28	Austen Henry Layard	He combines the love of truth and art with equal devotion and success	Ape	S 030	
1869-09-04	Napoleon III	La regime parlementaire	Coïdé	So 01	
1869-09-11	Henry Herbert, 4th Earl of Carnarvon	The whole life of that great party to which I thought I had the honour to belong was nothing but a mere organised hypocrisy	Ape	S 031	
1869-09-18	Isabella II of Spain	She has throughout her life been betrayed by those who should have been most faithful to her	Coïdé	So 02	
1869-09-25	James Hamilton, 1st Duke of Abercorn	Promoted from a Viceroyalty to a Dukedom	Ape	S 032	
1869-10-02	M. E. Grant Duff	A philosophic liberal	Ape	S 033	
1869-10-09	Leopold II of Belgium	Un roi constitutionnel	Coïdé	So 03	
1869-10-16	Alexander II of Russia	La civilisation Russe	Coïdé	So 04	
1869-10-23	Acton Smee Ayrton	Mind and Morality	Ape	S 034	
1869-10-30	Abdülaziz	Ote-toi de la que je m'y mette	Coïdé	So 05	
1869-11-06	Frederick Temple	He has displayed ability in the free handling of religious subjects, and has nevertheless been made a Bishop	Coïdé	M 0001	
1869-11-13	Anthony Ashley-Cooper, 7th Earl of Shaftesbury	He is not as other men are, for he is never influenced by party motives	Ape	S 035	
1869-11-20	Lord John Manners	Let arts and commerce, laws and learning die, But leave us still our old nobility	Ape	S 036	
1869-11-27	Ferdinand de Lesseps	He suppressed an isthmus	Coïdé	M 0002	
1869-12-04	Thomas Dundas, 2nd Earl of Zetland	The Most Worshipful Grand Master	Coïdé	S 037	
1869-12-11	Sir Alexander Cockburn, 12th Baronet	The Lord Chief Justice of England	Ape	J 01	
1869-12-18	James Wilde, 1st Baron Penzance	A Judge and Peer	Ape	J 02	
1869-12-25	Archibald Tait, Archbishop of Canterbury	An earnest and liberal primate	Coïdé	S 038	

Next List of Vanity Fair (British magazine) caricatures (1870–1874)
