= Baron de Grimm =

Baron de Grimm or Baron von Grimm may refer to:

- Constantin de Grimm (1845–1896), Russian-born artist and caricaturist
- Friedrich Melchior, Baron von Grimm (1723–1807), German-born journalist, art critic, and diplomat

== See also ==
- Grimm (disambiguation)
