= List of Vanity Fair (British magazine) caricatures =

The following is a list of caricatures published by the British magazine Vanity Fair (1868–1914).

== Caricatures ==
- List of Vanity Fair (British magazine) caricatures (1868–1869)
- List of Vanity Fair (British magazine) caricatures (1870–1874)
- List of Vanity Fair (British magazine) caricatures (1875–1879)
- List of Vanity Fair (British magazine) caricatures (1880–1884)
- List of Vanity Fair (British magazine) caricatures (1884–1889)
- List of Vanity Fair (British magazine) caricatures (1890–1894)
- List of Vanity Fair (British magazine) caricatures (1895–1899)
- List of Vanity Fair (British magazine) caricatures (1900–1904)
- List of Vanity Fair (British magazine) caricatures (1905–1909)
- List of Vanity Fair (British magazine) caricatures (1910–1914)

== Categories ==
Code	Category
H	Racehorses
J	Judges
L	Ladies
M	Men or Women of the Day
O	Our Celebrities
P	Princes
Pe	People of the Day
S	Statesmen
So	Sovereigns
SS	Summer supplement
W	Women of Genius
WS	Winter supplement
