= Constantin de Grimm =

Russian illustrator (1845–1896)

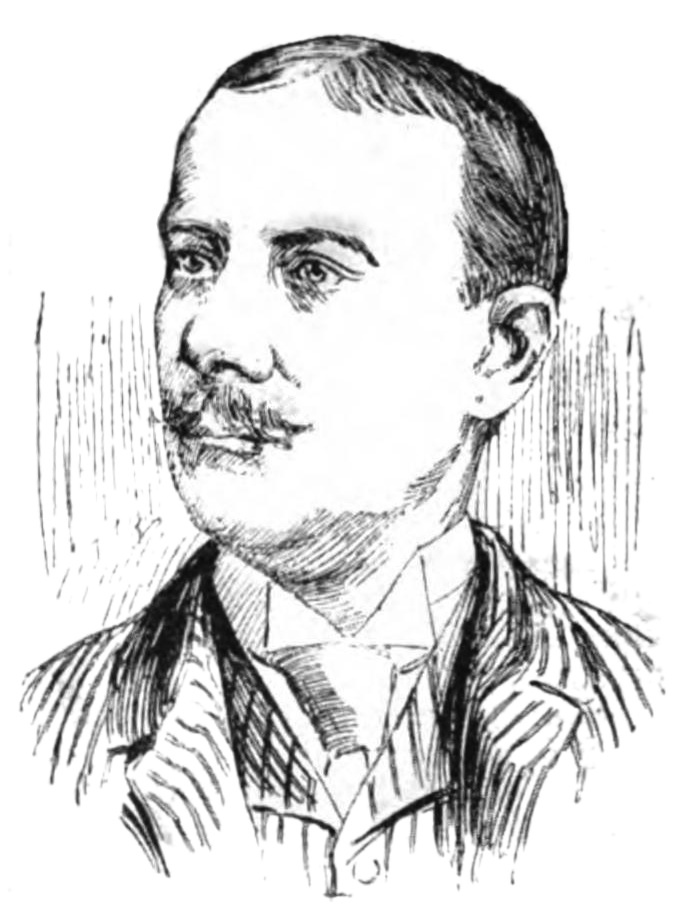
- Born: December 30, 1845; Saint Petersburg, Russia
- Died: April 16, 1896 (aged 50); New York City, US

Constantin de Grimm (December 30, 1845 – April 16, 1896), also known as Baron de Grimm, was a Russian illustrator known internationally for his caricatures in publications such as the Vanity Fair (UK; under the pseudonym "Nemo"), Kladderadatsch (Germany), The Evening Telegram (US), and the German edition of Puck, of which he was founder. He served multiple times as president of the German Press Club.

== Life ==
Born at the Winter Palace in Saint Petersburg, where his father taught the children of Czar Nicholas I, Grimm relocated to Berlin in 1860, and later to Leipzig, where he contributed drawings to Daheim. He served in the German Army from 1867 to 1873 and received the Iron Cross for bravery during the Franco-Prussian War. He then returned to cartooning, becoming assistant editor of Kladderadatsch in 1873, founding the German edition of Puck in 1874, and – after a year of art instruction at École des Beaux-Arts in Paris – became a journalist and drama critic.

Grimm went to the United States in 1884 after attracting the notice of James Gordon Bennett, publisher of the New York Herald, and became known to American readers through art in the Herald and Evening Telegram. He died in New York City in 1896 at the age of 50.

== Select illustrations ==
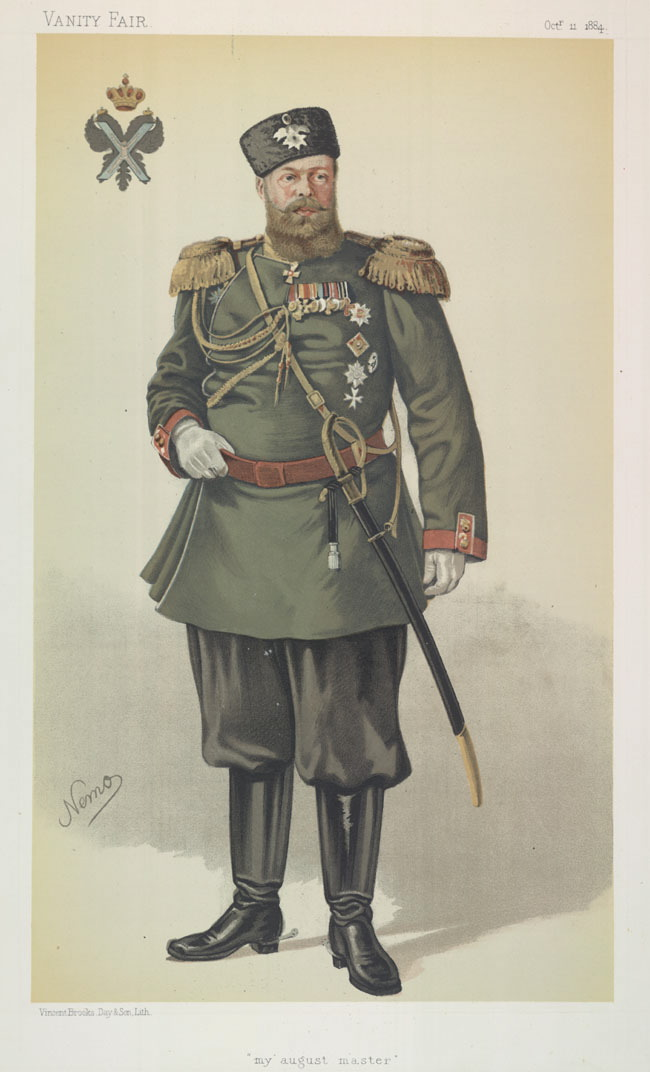
Alexander III of Russia, Vanity Fair, 1884

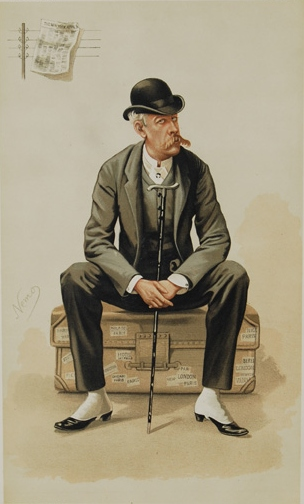
James G. Bennett Jr., Vanity Fair, 1884

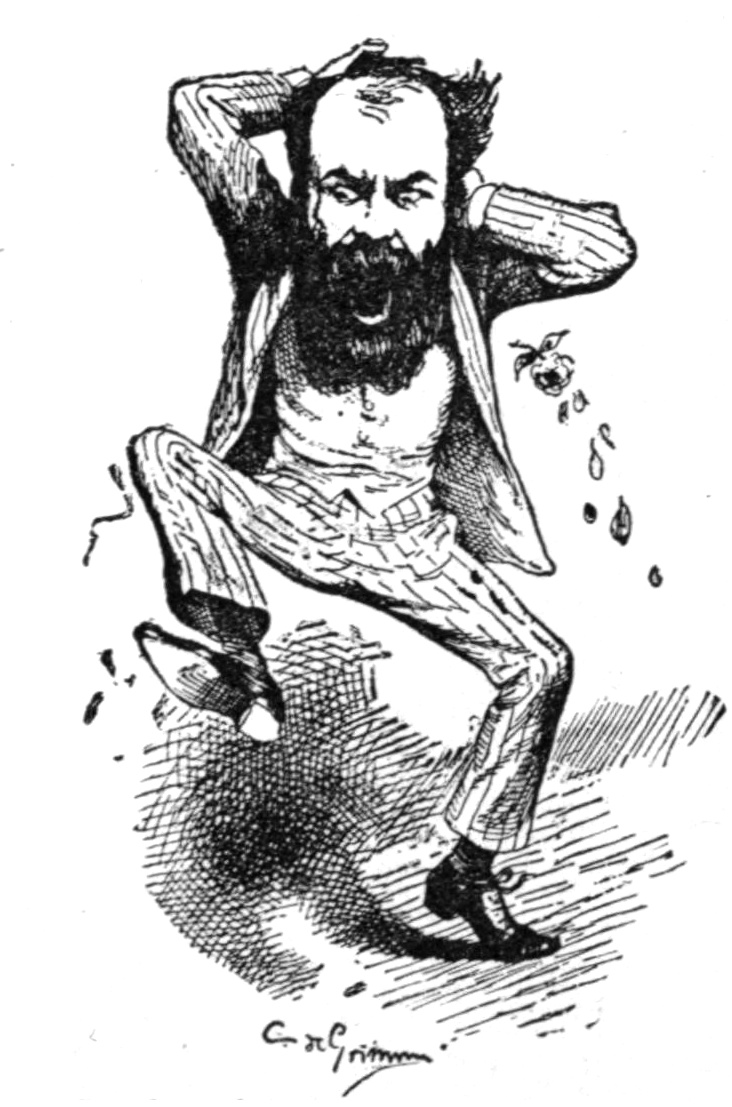
Caricature of Jay Gould, ca. 1888

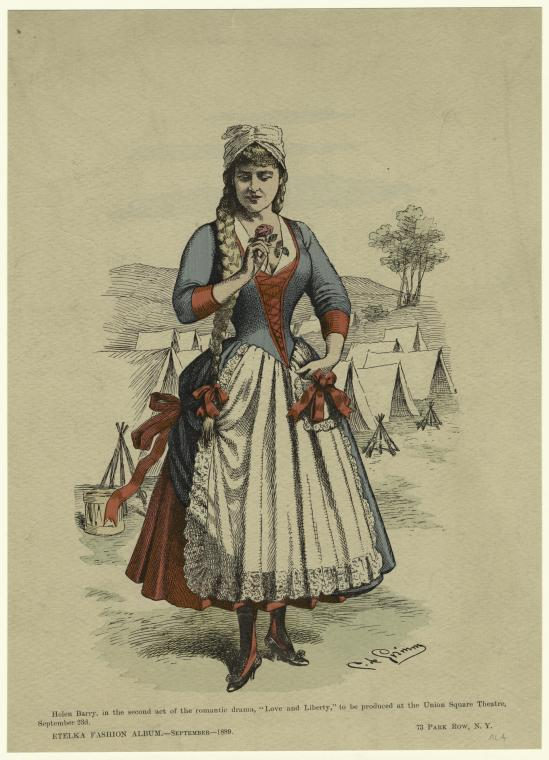
Actress Helen Barry, 1889

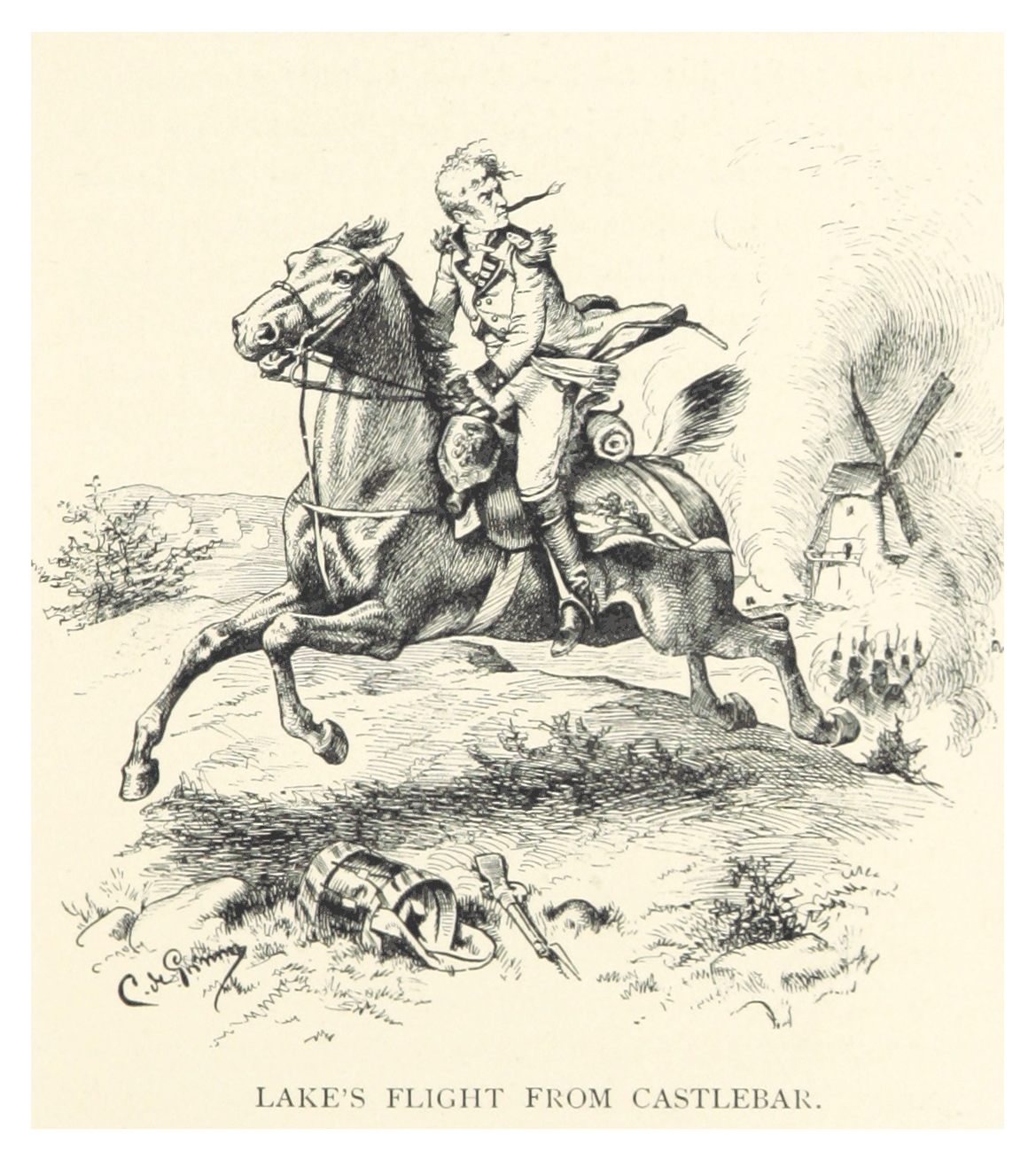
General Gerard Lake (1890)
