= Carlo Pellegrini (caricaturist) =

Italian-born British artist (1839–1889)

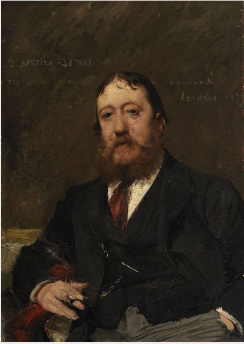
- Born: 25 March 1839; Capua, Kingdom of the Two Sicilies
- Died: 22 January 1889 (aged 49); London, England
- Style: caricature

Carlo Pellegrini (25 March 1839 – 22 January 1889), who did much of his work under the pseudonym of Ape, was an Italian-born British artist who served from 1869 to 1889 as a caricaturist for Vanity Fair magazine, a leading journal of London society. His work for the magazine made his reputation and he became its most influential artist.

== Early life ==
Pellegrini was born in Capua, then in the Kingdom of the Two Sicilies. His father came from an ancient land-owning family, while his mother was allegedly descended from the Medici. He was educated at the Collegio dei Barnabiti, and then at Sant'Antonio in Maddaloni, near Naples. As a young man he caricatured Neapolitan society, modelling his portraits on those of Melchiorre Delfico and Daumier and other French and British artists of the period. Pellegrini claimed to have fought with Garibaldi; however, those who knew him well dismissed this as fantasy.

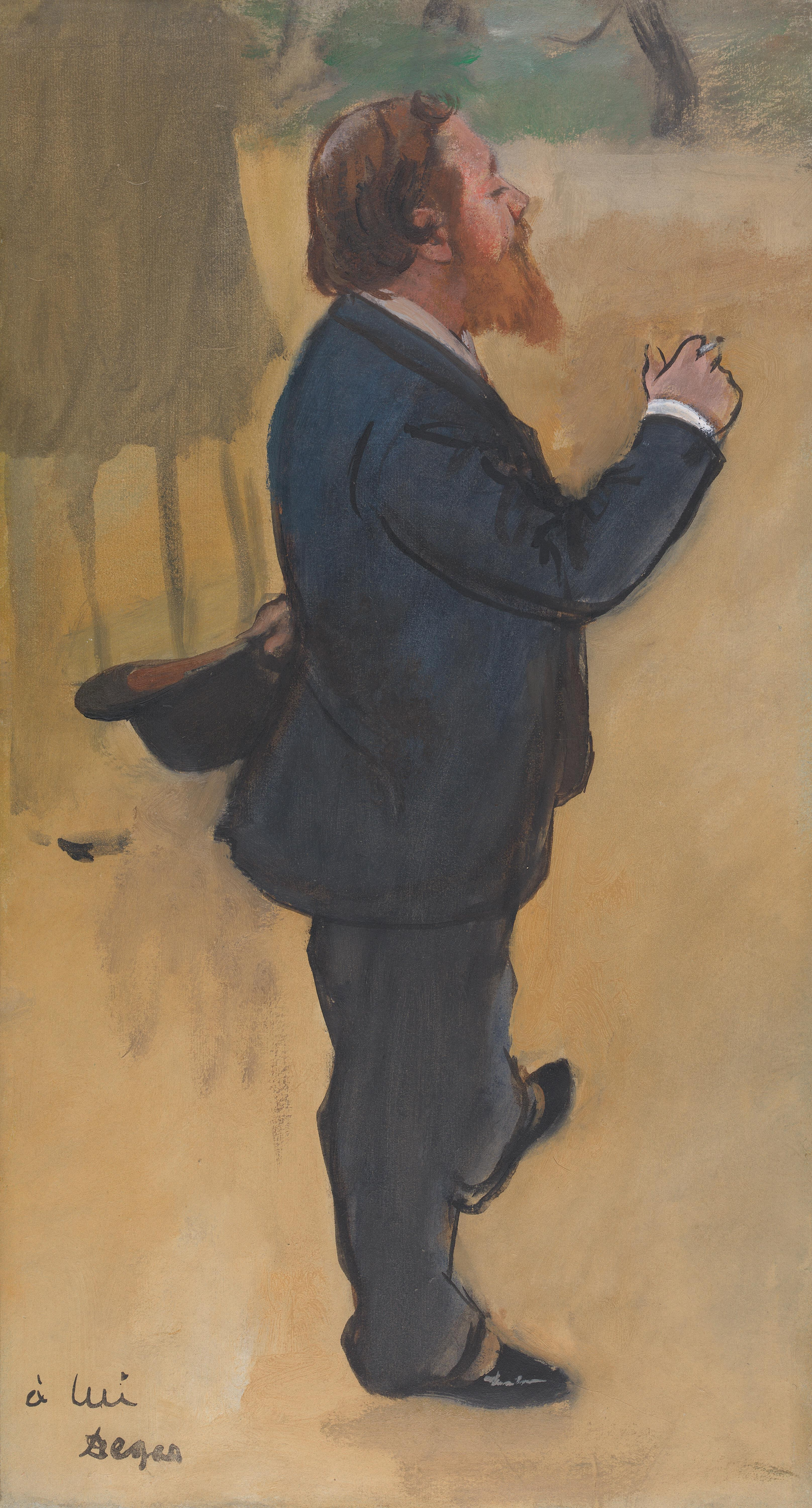
Pellegrini by Degas

Deciding to leave Italy in 1864 after a series of personal crises, including the death of his sister, he travelled to England via Switzerland and France. He arrived in London in November 1864; he later claimed to have arrived destitute, and to have slept on the streets and in doorways. However, this claim may have been another fantasy designed to make him seem to be a Bohemian artist. In London he became a friend of the Prince of Wales.

== Work for Vanity Fair ==
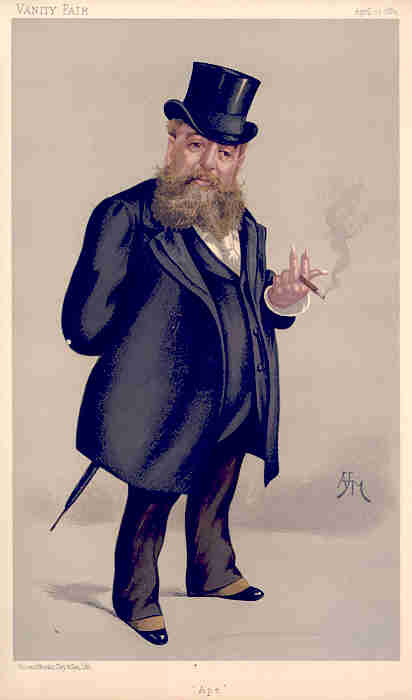
Carlo Pellegrini, Vanity Fair magazine's 'Ape' by Arthur H. Marks

It is not recorded how Pellegrini met Thomas Bowles, the owner of Vanity Fair magazine, but he quickly found himself employed by that publication and became its first caricaturist, originally signing his work as 'Singe' (French for "Monkey") and later, and more famously, as 'Ape' (a translation of "Singe" into English). Pellegrini's work for the magazine made his reputation and he became its most influential artist; it printed his caricatures for over twenty years, from January 1869 to April 1889. His 1869 caricature of Benjamin Disraeli was the first colour lithograph to appear in the magazine, and proved immensely popular. It was the first of a highly successful series of more than two thousand caricatures published by Vanity Fair. Although the later caricatures by Sir Leslie Ward are perhaps now more well known, those by 'Ape' are regarded by many collectors as being artistically and technically superior.

Apart from drawing his caricatures for the magazine, Pellegrini also attempted to set himself up as a portrait painter, but this venture met with limited success. Pellegrini met Degas in London in the 1870s, and in about 1876–77 painted his portrait, inscribed 'à vous/Pellegrini' (to you/Pellegrini). In return, Degas painted Pellegrini's portrait, similarly inscribed.

Pellegrini was a member of the Beefsteak Club in London and there met Whistler, who became a great influence on his work; indeed, he even attempted to paint portraits in the style of Whistler. Pellegrini was also a member of The Arts Club from 1874 until 1888.

Pellegrini was extremely careful about his appearance, and would wear immaculate white spats with highly polished boots. He grew long Mandarin-like fingernails, would never walk when he could ride, and had a limitless fund of amusing stories and eccentricities. He spoke broken-English, flaunted his homosexuality (at a time when it was dangerous to do so), and would often bring macaroni dishes to elegant dinner parties. He would refuse invitations to country houses out of fear of strange beds, and had a habit of keeping a cigar in his mouth as he slept.

He died of lung disease aged 49 at his home, 53 Mortimer Street, near Cavendish Square in London. He is buried in St. Mary's Roman Catholic Cemetery, Kensal Green, London.

== Gallery ==
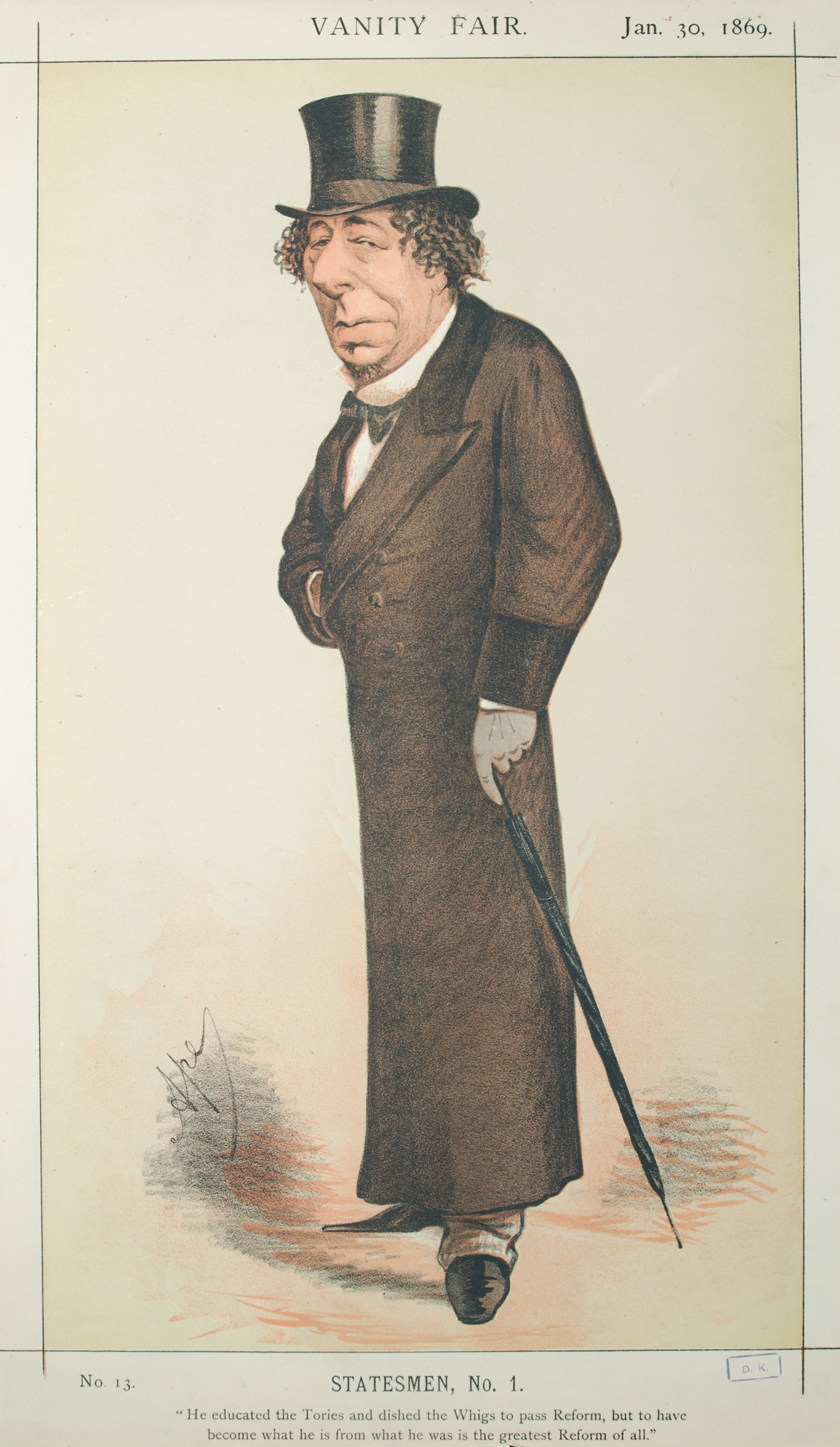
Benjamin Disraeli

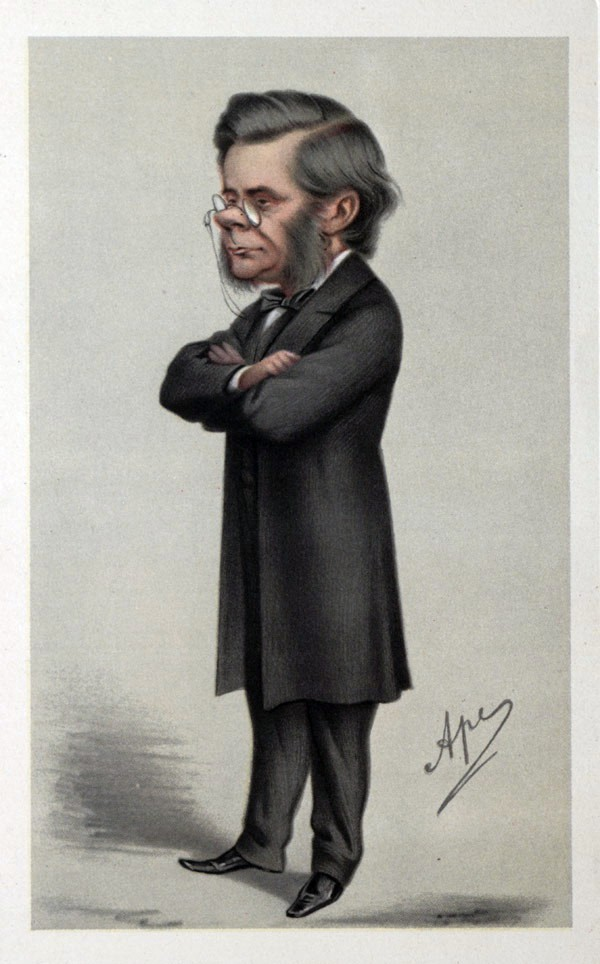
Thomas Henry Huxley

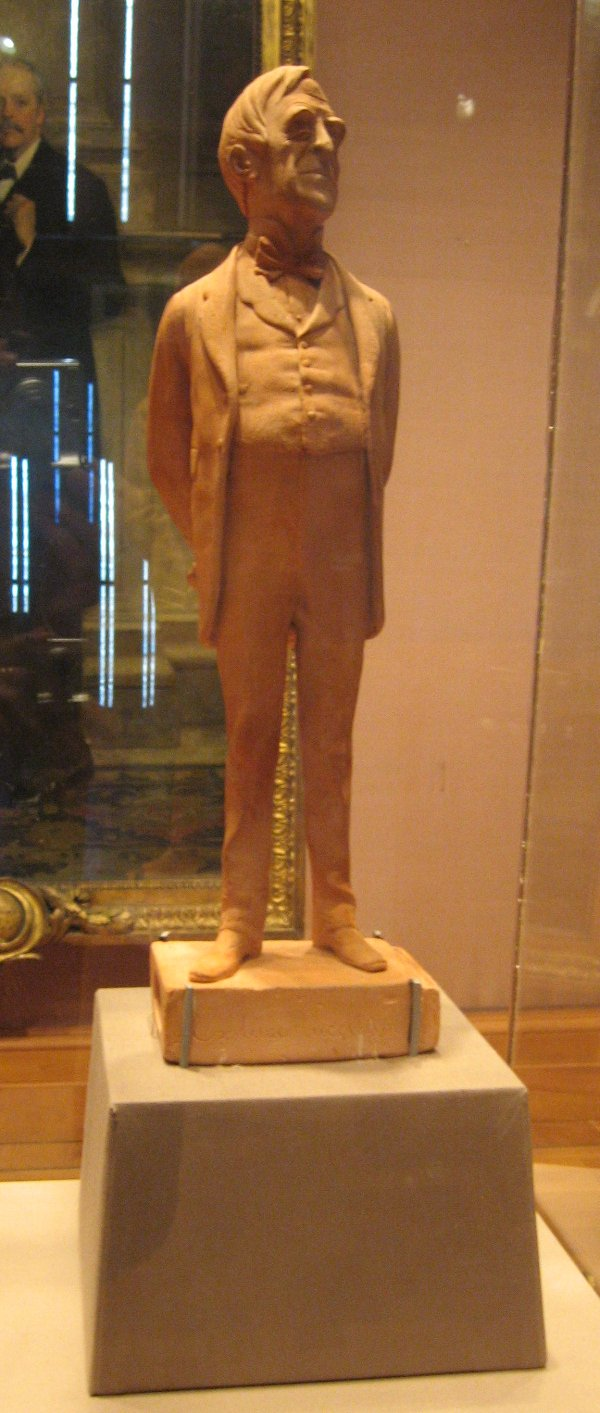
A unique statuette in terracotta by Pellegrini of Robert Lowe dated 1873

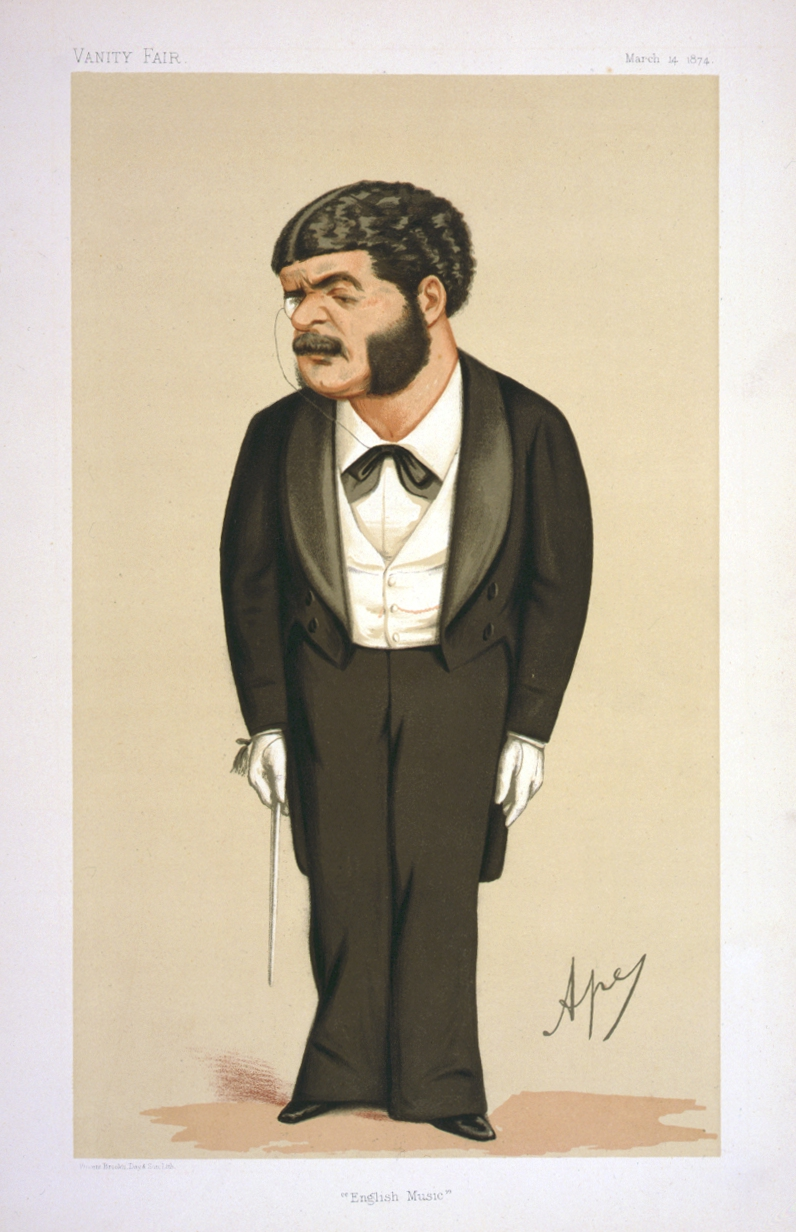
Arthur Sullivan

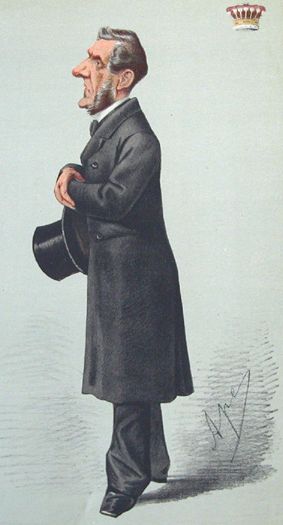
Anthony, Earl of Shaftesbury

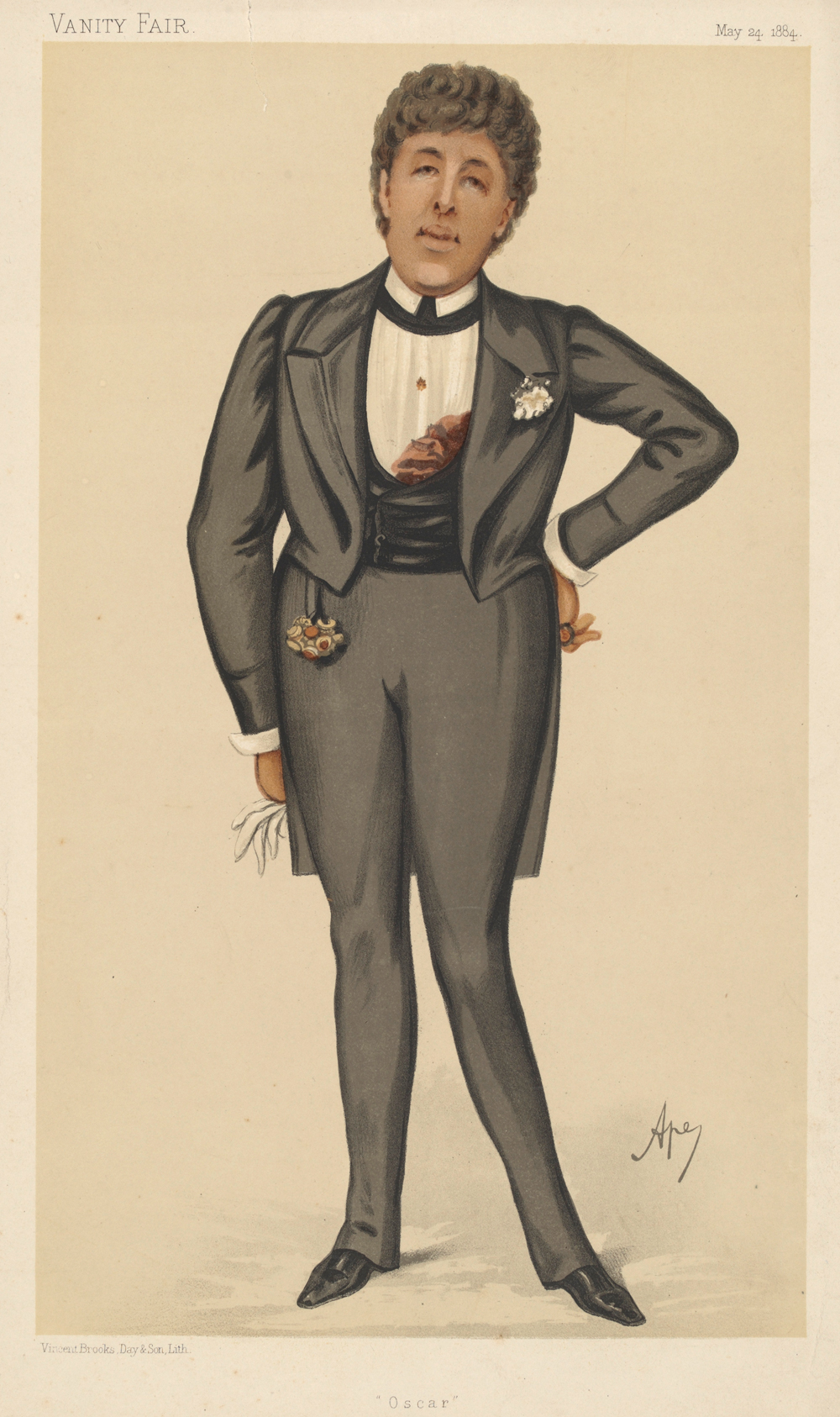
Oscar Wilde

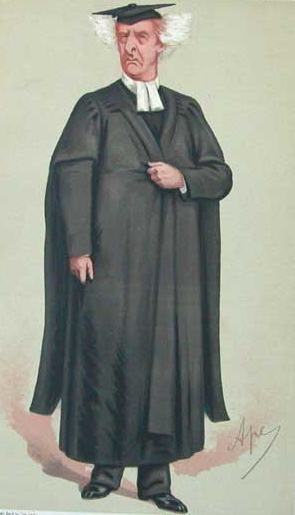
Henry Liddell

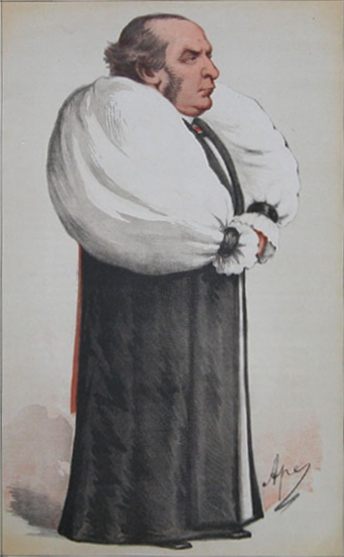
William Thomson, Archbishop of York

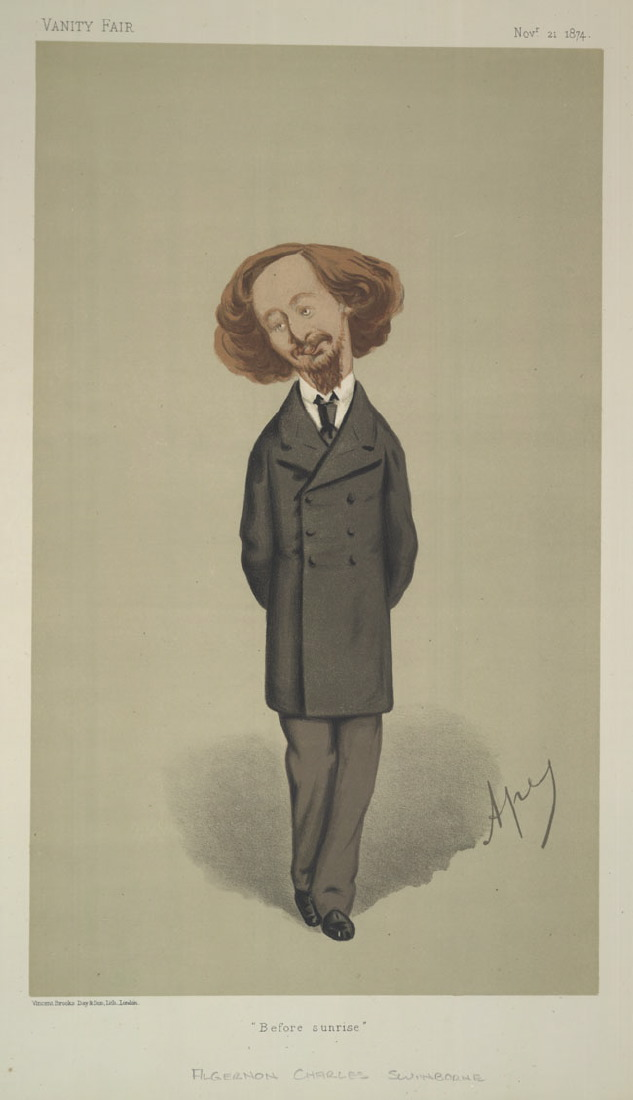
Algernon Charles Swinburne

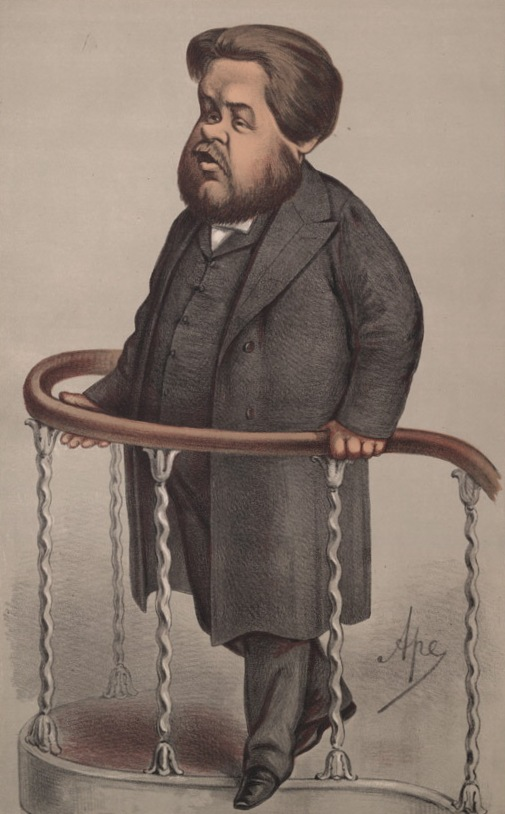
Charles Spurgeon

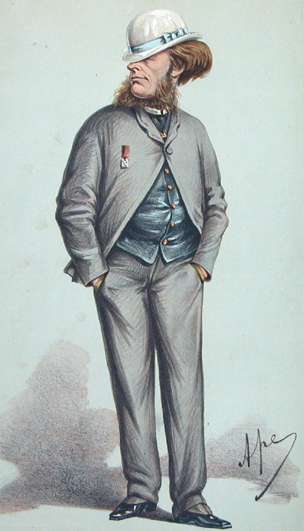
Francis, Lord Elcho

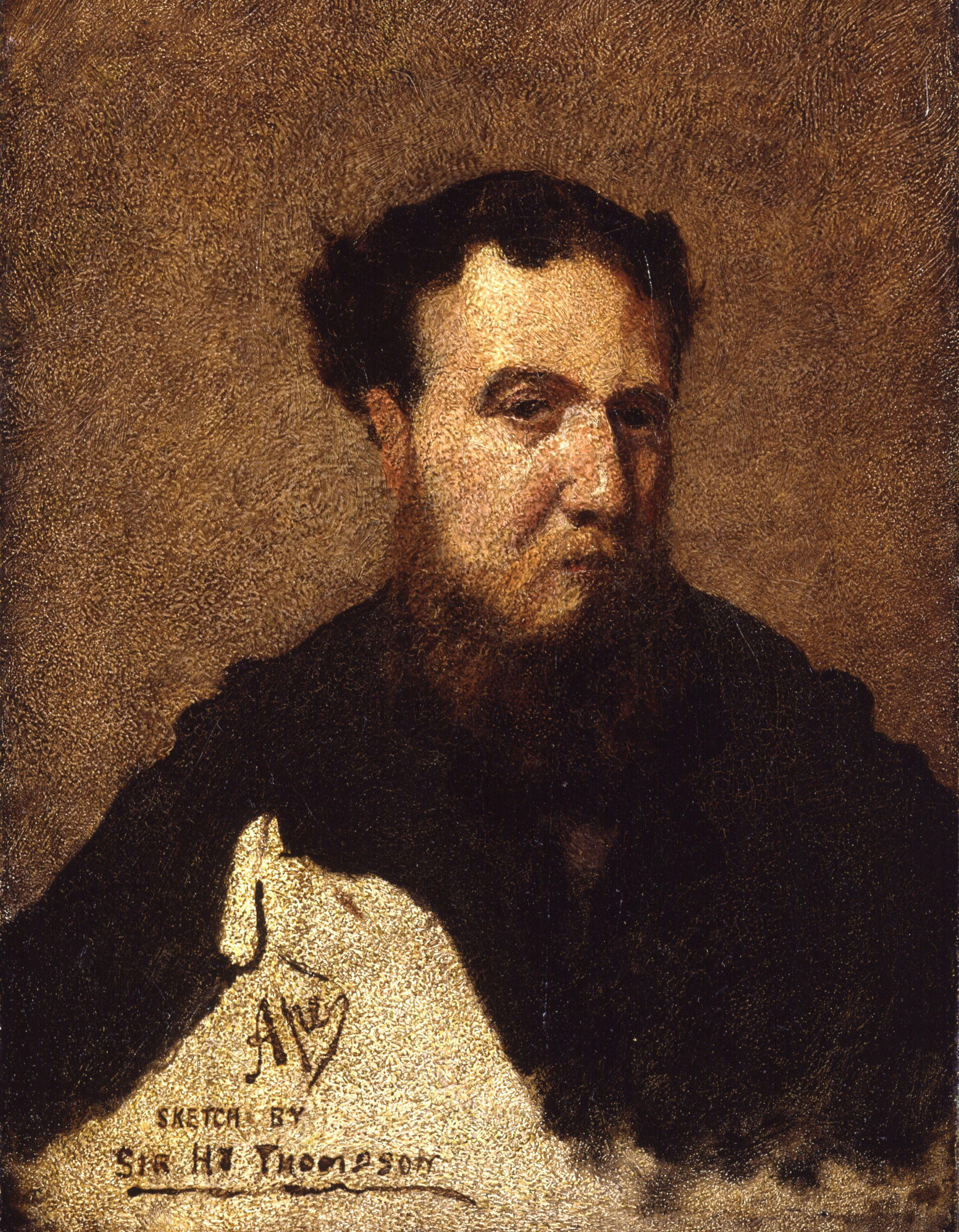
Pellegrini by Sir Henry Thompson

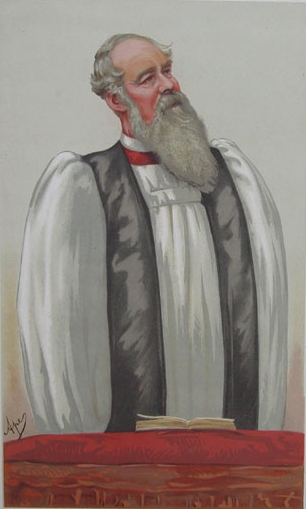
J. C. Ryle, first Anglican bishop of Liverpool

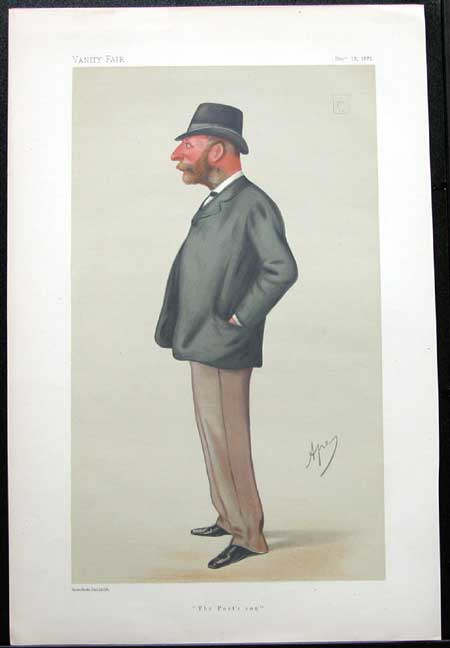
PF Shelley, "The poet's son"

== See also ==
- Vanity Fair caricatures
