= List of Vanity Fair (British magazine) caricatures (1910–1914) =

Prev List of Vanity Fair (British magazine) caricatures (1910–1914)

Publication Date	Subject	Caption	Caricaturist	Notes	Pic.
6 Jan 1910	George Younger	Ayr Burghs	HCO	M 1208	
6 Jan 1910	Sir John Barker	Falmouth	HCO	M 1209	
6 Jan 1910	Emmanuel Belilos	Billy	PIP	M 1210	
6 Jan 1910	Arthur du Cros	Hastings and Aviation	HCO	M 1211	
13 Jan 1910	Archer Baker	C.P.R. in Europe	ELF	M 1212	
20 Jan 1910	Solomon Joel	Sollie	HCO	M 1213	
27 Jan 1910	Arthur Balfour	Dialectics	XIT	M 1214	
27 Jan 1910	Santry	Santry	Frank Paton	H 12	
3 Feb 1910	John Bland-Sutton	A Great Surgeon	ELF	M 1215	
10 Feb 1910	Sir Evelyn Ruggles-Brise	Borstal System	Spy	M 1216	
10 Feb 1910	Torpoint	Torpoint	Percy Earl	H 13	
17 Feb 1910	Herbert Haynes Twining	Herbs	HCO	M 1217; head of Twinings Bank	
24 Jan 1910	James Richard Hennessy	Lutteur ***	HCO	M 1218; of the Hennessy company; owner of Lutteur III	
3 Mar 1910	Joseph Lyons	Joe	HCO	M 1219; founder, J. Lyons and Co.	
10 Mar 1910	Reginald Welby, 1st Baron Welby	The Treasury	HCO	M 1220	
17 Mar 1910	H. H. Asquith	A Great Orator	XIT	M 1221	
24 Mar 1910	Pridham Henry Pridham-Wippell	Pridham	ELF	M 1222	
31 Mar 1910	Charles Workman	Through every passion raging	ELF	M 1223	
7 Apr 1910	Sir Philip Watts	Naval Construction	Spy	M 1224	
14 Apr 1910	John Crichton-Stuart, 4th Marquess of Bute	The Bute	WHO	M 1225	
21 Apr 1910	Sir Theodore Francis Brinckman	Theodore	ELF	M 1226	
28 Apr 1910	Robert Yerburgh	Chester	WHO	M 1227	
5 May 1910	Anthony Joseph Drexel	Tony	ELF	M 1228	
12 May 1910	King Edward VII	The Pacificator of Europe	XIT		
19 May 1910	Sir John Nutting	JG	Pry	M 1229	
26 May 1910	Sir Charles Huntington, 3rd Baronet	Tubby	Quip	M 1230	
1 Jun 1910	John Porter	John Porter	XIT	M 1231	
8 Jun 1910	Gen Sir Alfred Turner	Versatility	WHO	M 1232	
15 Jun 1910	Christabel Pankhurst	Women's Suffrage	Spy		
22 Jun 1910	Guy Owen	Tea cum Rubber	ELF	M 1233	
29 Jun 1910	Alfred W. Cox	Fairie	Spy	M 1234	
6 Jul 1910	Robert Foster	Bill	ELF	M 1235	
13 Jul 1910	Lord Ninian Crichton-Stuart	Cardiff	WHO	M 1236	
20 Jul 1910	Richard Vassar-Smith	Lloyds Bank	HCO	M 1237	
27 Jul 1910	Stephen Coleridge	Anti-Vivisection	ELF	M 1238	
3 Aug 1910	Colin Blythe	Charlie	ALS	M 1239	
10 Aug 1910	Col John Denny	Philip	WHO	M 1240	
17 Aug 1910	William Balle Huntington	Endowed Lectures	Pry	M 1241	
24 Aug 1910	Sir James King	King of Campsie	HCO	M 1242; Laird of Campsie and Carstairs	
31 Aug 1910	Arthur Smith-Barry, 1st Baron Barrymore	An Irish Landowner	Spy	M 1243	
7 Sep 1910	John Hamilton-Buchanan	Long John	Quip	M 1243	
14 Sep 1910	Marshall Stevens	Manchester Ship Canal	ELF	M 1244	
21 Sep 1910	Godfrey Baring	Isle of Wight	Spy	M 1245	
28 Sep 1910	William Speirs Simpson	Science and Invention	Spy	M 1246	
5 Oct 1910	Ernest Renan	The Greatest of Fathers	GUTH	M 1247	
12 Oct 1910	Matthew White Ridley, 2nd Viscount Ridley	Tariff Reform League	WHO	M 1248	
19 Oct 1910	Alfred Emmott	The Deputy Speaker	WHO	M 1249	
26 Oct 1910	Richard Herschell, 2nd Baron Herschell	A Lord-in-waiting	WHO	M 1250	
2 Nov 1910	Sir Edward Tennant	Glen	WHO	M 1251	
9 Nov 1910	Emile Garcke	Electrical Energy	HCO	M 1252	
16 Nov 1910	John Jenkins, 1st Baron Glantawe	Swansea	WHO	M 1253	
23 Nov 1910	Martinez de Hoz	An Argentine Sportsman	WHO	M 1254	
30 Nov 1910	Sir Philip Waterlow	Philip	WHO	M 1255	
7 Dec 1910	John Ainsworth	Johnnie	WHO	M 1256	
14 Dec 1910	Col Sir Philip Chetwode	19th Hussars	WHO	M 1257	
21 Dec 1910	Alfred Butt	The Palace	HCO	M 1258; sketch of Maud Allan in background	
28 Dec 1910	Arthur Collins	The Guv'nor	Wallace Hester	M 1259	
4 Jan 1911	Oswald Stoll	The Coliseum	Ape Junior	M 1260	
11 Jan 1911	Clarence Ravenscroft	The Birkbeck	Ape Junior	M 1261; Manager, Birkbeck Bank	
18 Jan 1911	Charles Lush	Like father like son	Ape Junior	M 1262	
25 Jan 1911	Price Ellison	British Columbia	Wallace Hester	M 1263	
1 Feb 1911	William Foy	A Well-known face in the Timber World	HCO	M 1264	
8 Feb 1911	Sir Edward Carson	Dublin University	Wallace Hester	M 1265	
15 Feb 1911	Col Daniel Driscoll	An old war horse	Ape Junior	M 1266	
22 Feb 1911	Marshall Roberts	Easton Hall	Spy	M 1267	
1 Mar 1911	Ernest Collins	A Great Engineer	Ape Junior	M 1268	
8 Mar 1911	Winston Churchill	Winnie	Nibs	M 1269	
15 Mar 1911	Harry Eve	A Good Judge	Ape Junior	M 1270	
22 Mar 1911	Julian Orde	A Popular Secretary	Ape Junior	M 1271; Secretary, Royal Automobile Club	
29 Mar 1911	Robert Bourne	a good stroke	Ape Junior	M 1272	
5 Apr 1911	Sir Beerbohm Tree	His Majesty's Theatre	Nibs	M 1273	
12 Apr 1911	Canon Edgar Sheppard	the Sub-Dean	Ape Junior	M 1274	
19 Apr 1911	Lt-Gen Sir Robert Baden-Powell	Boy Scouts	Ape Junior	M 1275	
26 Apr 1911	George Edwardes	The Guv'nor	Nibs	M 1276	
3 May 1911	Christopher Clarke Hutchinson	Hutchy	Ape Junior	M 1277	
10 May 1911	Claude Graham-White	Claudie	Tec	M 1278	
17 May 1911	Montague Pyke	Cinematographs	Ape Junior	M 1279	
24 May 1911	Sir John Robinson	Worksop Manor	Spy	M 1280; former High Sheriff of Nottinghamshire	
31 May 1911	Sidney Buller-Fullerton-Elphinstone, 16th Lord Elphinstone	Carberry Tower	Ape Junior	M 1281	
7 Jun 1911	Queen Alexandra	Her Majesty Queen Alexandra		O 1282	
14 Jun 1911	Robert Houston	The Britisher's Best Friend	Spy	O 1283	
21 Jun 1911	H. J. Brown	Oil	Spy	M 1284	
21 Jun 1911	King George V	His Majesty The King	Ape Junior		
28 Jun 1911	Thomas Scrutton	Copyright	Ape Junior	M 1285	
5 Jul 1911	Frank Matcham	Architect Matcham	Nibs	M 1286	
12 Jul 1911	Edward, Prince of Wales	HRH	Nibs	O 1287	
19 Jul 1911	Capt James Craig	Orangeman	WHO	M 1288	
26 Jul 1911	Sir George Kekewich	A Sturdy Educationist	WHO	M 1289	
2 Aug 1911	Thomas Cochrane	North Ayrshire	Spy	M 1290	
9 Aug 1911	Frederick Smith	No Surrender	Nibs	M 1291	
16 Aug 1911	George Bernard Shaw	GBS	Ritchie	M 1292	
23 Aug 1911	Edward Law, 5th Baron Ellenborough	Nautical freshness	WHO	M 1293	
30 Aug 1911	Col R. E. B. Crompton	The Road Builder	WHO	M 1294	
6 Sep 1911	Sir Charles Holcroft	Brumagem 'Varsity	HCO	M 1295	
13 Sep 1911	James Garvin	?-!	Ritchie	M 1296	
20 Sep 1911	Capt Sir William Nott-Bower	City Police	RAY	M 1297	
27 Sep 1911	Sir Alfred Gould	Surgical Diagnosis	WH	M 1298	
4 Oct 1911	Dr Thomas Allinson	Wholemeal Bread	RAY	M 1299	
11 Oct 1911	Edward Talbot	Winton	RAY	M 1300	
18 Oct 1911	Sir John Simon	Simple Simon	WH	M 1301	
25 Oct 1911	Sir George Askwith	The Conciliator	WH	M 1302	
1 Nov 1911	Samuel Cody	All British	Ritchie	M 1303	
8 Nov 1911	Sir Thomas Crosby	His Lordship of London MD	WH	M 1304	
13 Nov 1911	Oscar Hammerstein I	Opera de Luxe	RAY	M 1305	
22 Nov 1911	Arthur Bettinson	Peggy	WH	M 1306	
29 Nov 1911	Oscar Asche	Kismet	Ritchie	M 1307	
6 Dec 1911	Gordon Selfridge	Self--	Ritchie	M 1308	
13 Dec 1911	William McAuliffe	Stonehenge 1911	Ritchie	M 1309	
20 Dec 1911	Lucien Wolf	Diplomaticus	Ritchie	M 1310	
27 Dec 1911	Philip Wilson	PWW	Ritchie	M 1311	
3 Jan 1912	Vice-Adm Sir Frederick Fisher	Uncle Bill	Ray	M 1312	
10 Jan 1912	Robert Loraine	The Flying Stage	Ritchie	M 1313	
17 Jan 1912	Sir Edward Carson	I never ask anyone to do anything which I will not do myself	WH	M 1314	
24 Jan 1912	Llewellyn Atherley-Jones	Jonesey	WH	M 1315	
31 Jan 1912	William Inge	The Genial Dean	WH	M 1316	
7 Feb 1912	Sir George Savage	Ms Sana	Ray	M 1317	
14 Feb 1912	Eugene Corri	a typical Englishman	Ritchie	M 1318; first boxing referee to officiate from inside the ring	
21 Feb 1912	G. K. Chesterton	GKC	Strickland	M 1319	
28 Feb 1912	William Shuster	The Yankee from Persia	WH	M 1320	
3 Mar 1912	Norman Angell	an Angel of Peace	Strickland	M 1321	
13 Mar 1912	Sir Charles Macara	a leading Figure in the Cotton Industry	Ritchie	M 1322	
20 Mar 1912	Sir Charles Cradock-Hartopp	Topps	WH	M 1323	
27 Mar 1912	Herbert Ryle	the Dean	WH	M 1324	
3 Apr 1912	Sidney Swann	The Light Blues Stroke	WH	M 1325	
10 Apr 1910	Bonar Law	The Opposition	Strickland	M 1326	
17 Apr 1912	Pietro Mascagni	The Intermezzo	WH	M 1327	
24 Apr 1912	Hensley Henson	St Margaret's	WH	M 1328	
1 May 1912	Lionel Ford	New Harrow	Strickland	M 2270	
8 May 1912	Evan Spicer	Paper	Ray	M 2271	
15 May 1912	Samuel Osborn	Sam	WH	M 2272	
22 May 1912	Arthur Winnington-Ingram	In his lighter moments	WH	M 2273	
29 May 1912	Charles Coop	Prospectuses	WH	M 2274	
5 Jun 1912	Frank Ree	L and NW	WH	M 2275	
12 Jun 1912	R. A. Stewart Hollebone	Big things in Oil	WH	M 2276	
19 June 1912	Hugh Lowther, 5th Earl of Lonsdale	the Horse has no better friend	WH	M 2277	
26 Jun 1912	Lt-Col Mark Sykes	Our Mark	WH	M 2278	
3 Jul 1912	John C. Carter	Steered three winning crews	WH	M 2279	
10 Jul 1912	Lt-Col Charles Crosse	Bisley Camp	WH	M 2280	
17 Jul 1912	Maj-Gen Herbert Eaton, 3rd Baron Cheylesmore	Arms and Sport	WH	M 2281	
24 Jul 1912	Capt George Swinton	East and West	Ray	M 2282	
31 Jul 1912	Gustav Hamel	Flight	WH	M 2283	
7 Aug 1912	Jack Hobbs	A Tested Centurion	WH	M 2284	
14 Aug 1912	Sir Arthur Griffith-Boscawen	Housing	Ray	M 2285	
21 Aug 1912	John Hassall	Posters	Strickland	M 2286	
28 Aug 1912	Charles Jerningham	Marmaduke	WH	M 2287	
4 Sep 1912	Sir Robert Hadfield	Steel	WH	M 2288	
11 Sep 1912	Arthur Kinnaird, 11th Lord Kinnaird	Soccer	WH	M 2289	
18 Sep 1912	Frederick Vincent Brooks	A Master Craftsman	WH	M 2290	
25 Sep 1912	Harry Tate	The King's Jester	WH	M 2291	
2 Oct 1912	Paul Cambon	His Excellency The French Ambassador	K	M 2292	
9 Oct 1912	William Waldegrave, 9th Earl Waldegrave	Earl Waldegrave	WH	M 2293	
16 Oct 1912	Sir Henry Austin Lee	Sir Henry Austin Lee KCMG CB	K	M 2294	
23 Oct 1912	Sir Frank Lascelles	Sir Frank Lascelles GCB GCMG	K	M 2295	
30 Oct 1910	Sarah Bernhardt	Madame Sarah Bernhardt	K	M 2296	
6 Nov 1912	Lady Dorothy Nevill	The Lady Dorothy Nevill	K	M 2297	
13 Nov 1912	Luís Pinto de Soveral, 1st Marquis of Soveral	The Marquis de Soveral GCMG GCVO	K	M 2298	
20 Nov 1912	Mrs George	Mrs George Cornwallis-West	K	M 2299	
27 Nov 1912	Luke White, 3rd Baron Annaly	The Lord Annaly	K	M 2300	
4 Dec 1912	Capt Henry Denison	Captain the Hon Henry Denison	WH	M 2301	
11 Dec 1912	Arthur Wellesley, 4th Duke of Wellington	His Grace the Duke of Wellington KG GCVO DL	WH	M 2302	
18 Dec 1912	Laurence Irving	Mr Laurence Irving	WH	M 2303	
25 Dec 1912	Col William Walker	Colonel William	WH	M 2304	
1 Jan 1913	Adelbert Brownlow-Cust, 3rd Earl Brownlow	Earl Brownlow PC	WH	M 2305	
8 Jan 1913	Lt-Col Sir Robert William Inglis	Lt-Col Sir Robert William Inglis	WH	M 2306	
13 Jan 1913	Richard Webster, 1st Viscount Alverstone	Lord Chief Justice of England	WH	M 2307	
22 Jan 1913	Malcolm Burr	Science and Sport	WH	M 2308	
29 Jan 1913	Sir Ralph Henry Knox	Knox	WH	M 2309	
5 Feb 1913	John Hickory Wood	Modern Pantomime	WH	M 2310	
19 Jan 1913	Capt Robert Falcon Scott	The South Pole	WH	M 2311	
26 Feb 1913	Dennis Eadie	Mr Eadie	WH	M 2312	
5 Mar 1913	Maurice Hewlett	An Artist in verbal pigments	WH	M 2313	
12 Mar 1913	Woodrow Wilson	The New President of the United States	WH	M 2314	
19 Mar 1913	Richard Haldane	Government Marked	OWL	M 2315	
26 Mar 1913	Sir Edward Grey	The general colour of the Secretary Bird is bluish Grey	OWL	M 2316	
2 Apr 1913	Arnold Bennett	The Business Man of Letters	OWL	M 2317	
9 Apr 1913	Herbert A. Humphrey	The Chingford Pump	Hester	M 2318	
19 Apr 1913	Sir Frederick Banbury	The Blocker	Eianley Cock	M 2319	
23 Apr 1913	Reginald McKenna	The Universal Puzzle is: find Mr McKenna	OWL	M 2320	
30 Apr 1913	Charles Brookfield	He never attacks morality	Ritchie	M 2321	
7 May 1913	John Lavery	He paints various Royalties	Ritchie	M 2322	
14 May 1913	Henry V. Esmond	Uncle Sandy	Wallace Hester	M 2323	
1913-05-21	Sir William Lane	Willie	Eianley Cock	M 2324	
1913-05-28	A Nikisch	Nikisch	OWL	M 2325	
1913-06-04	Sir J Forbes-Robertson	Mr Forbes-Robertson	Ritchie	M 2326	
1913-06-11	E Phillpotts	The Prophet of Dartmoor	Ritchie	M 2327	
1913-06-18	Sir Rufus Isaacs	Why Man, He Doth bestride the narrow world/Like a Colossus… Men at some time are masters of their fates/The fault, dear Rufus, is not in our stars/But in ourselves	OWL	M 2328	
1913-06-25	Raymond Poincaré	Messieurs	OWL	M 2329	
1913-07-02	Arthur Gore	Baby	Eianley Cock	M 2330	
1913-07-09	Col Montague Johnstone	Monty	Wallace Hester	M 2331	
1913-07-16	Prince Arthur William Patrick Albert	HRH	Wallace Hester	M 2332	
1913-07-23	Cheri Raymond Halbronn	The French Tattersall	OWL	M 2333	
1913-07-30	Sir Charles Tupper 1st Baronet	Sir Charles Tupper Bt	OWL	M 2334	
1913-08-06	Sir Charles C. Allom	Istria (yacht)	OWL	M 2335	
1913-08-13	Charles Ernest Nicholson	He is the one designer	OWL	M 2336	
1913-08-20	John Merry LeSage	The Daily Telegraph	OWL	M 2337	
1913-08-27	August Bebel	August Bebel		M 2338	
1913-09-03	Ted Dillon	The Champion County	OWL	M 2339	
1913-09-10	Lou Tellegen	Dorian Gray	OWL	M 2340	
1913-09-17	Sir James Rankin, 1st Baronet	MFH for Herefordshire	OWL	M 2341	
1913-09-24	Robert Reid, 1st Earl Loreburn	Loreburn	OWL	M 2342	
1913-10-01	Capt Quintin Dick	Dandy Dick	Astz	M 2343	
1913-10-08	O Stoll	The Coliseum	OWL	M 2344	
1913-10-15	Prince Arthur Frederick Patrick Albert	Prince Arthur	OWL	M 2345	
1913-10-22	James Stevens	Jimmy	Astz	M 2346	
1913-10-29	R Williams	Rhys KC	OWL	M 2347	
1913-11-05	Emile Joseph Dillon	The Semi-official ambassador	OWL	M 2348	
1913-11-12	Frank Harris	Unpath'd Waters	OWL	M 2349	
1913-11-19	Sir SO Buckmaster	The Solicitor General	OWL	M 2350	
1913-11-26	AH Savage Landor	The Cutter of Continents	Astz	M 2351	
1913-12-03	Landon Ronald	Guildhall Music	Astz	M 2352	
1913-12-10	Raymond Rôze	Opera in English	Astz	M 2353	
1913-12-10	Collapse of the Conference	Born June 17 – died November 10 / 'If so shortly I was done for, What was I begun for?' (Old Epitaph for an infant)	Mouse	WS; Asquith, Lloyd George, Balfour, Chamberlain, Bonar Law, and others; double print	
1913-12-17	Kenelm Foss	Magic	Astz	M 2354	
1913-12-24	Courtenay Foote	The Man on the Film	Astz	M 2355	
1913-12-31	Robert Windsor-Clive, 1st Earl of Plymouth	Crystal Palace	Hit	M 2356	
1914-01-07	Sir C Wyndham	Le Doyen	Astz	M 2357	
1914-01-14	J Chamberlain	The Great Imperialist	Astz	M 2358	
