= List of Vanity Fair (British magazine) caricatures (1905–1909) =

<< List of Vanity Fair caricatures (1900–1904) >> List of Vanity Fair caricatures (1910–1914)

Publication date	Subject	Caption	Caricaturist	Notes	Pic.
5 Jan 1905	Joseph Joachim	The last of the classical school	Spy	M 0945	
12 Jan 1905	Prof E. R. Lankester	His religion is the worship of all sorts of winged and finny freaks	Spy	M 0946	
19 Jan 1905	Sir John Thornycroft	Destroyers	Spy	M 0947	
26 Jan 1905	Sir John Wolfe-Barry	He has engineered nothing better than his own fortunes	Spy	M 0948	
2 Feb 1905	Sir Charles Stanford	He found Harmony	Spy	M 0949	
9 Feb 1905	Richard Walter Hely-Hutchinson, 6th Earl of Donoughmore	A most discreet under secretary, drawn for the first time	Spy	M 0940	
16 Feb 1905	Prince Louis of Battenberg	He was born a Serene Highness but has lived it down	Spy	M 0941	
23 Feb 1905	Maj John Seely	Extinction, Distinction – which will it be? Something of both at present, say the spiteful	Spy	M 0942	
2 Mar 1905	Bonar Law	A gentle shepherd who would lead his flock in to the protectionist fold	Spy	M 0943	
9 Mar 1905	Egerton Castle	He insists that his pen is mightier than his sword	Spy	M 0944	
16 Mar 1905	Guglielmo Marconi	Wires without wires	Spy	M 0945	
23 Mar 1905	John Stewart-Murray, Marquess of Tullibardine	Scottish horse	Spy	M 0946	
30 Mar 1905	Lionel Brough	a fellow of infinite jest	Spy	M 0947	
9 Apr 1905	Will Crooks	The Labourer is worthy of his hire	Spy	M 0948	
13 Apr 1905	Sir Robert Ball	popular Astronomy	Spy	M 0949	
20 Apr 1905	William Onslow, 4th Earl of Onslow	Chairman of Committees in the Lords	Spy	M 0960	
27 Apr 1905	Victor Bruce, 9th Earl of Elgin	He has decided where Churches disagree	Spy	M 0961	
4 May 1905	Maj-Gen Sir James Wolfe Murray	The Master General	Spy	M 0962	
11 May 1905	Maj William Evans-Gordon	The Alien Immigrant	Spy	M 0963	
18 May 1905	Sir Anderson Critchett, 1st Baronet	The King's Oculist	Spy	M 0964	
25 May 1905	John Roberts, Jr	The champion of 1885	Spy	Reprint of 1885-04-04	
25 May 1905	Harry Stevenson	He might be champion if there were a Championship	Spy	M 0965	
1 Jun 1905	William, German Crown Prince	Oh, child may'st thou be less talkative than thy father, But in all else like him Ajax	GUTH	M 0966	
8 Jun 1905	Sir Peter Carlaw Walker, 2nd Baronet	Peter	Spy	M 0967	
15 Jun 1905	Walter Lawrence	The Prince's cicerone	Spy	M 0968	
22 Jun 1905	Sir John Poynder-Dickson	To abandon Conservative ideals is to destroy the Empire	Spy	M 0969	
29 Jun 1905	Gilbert Elliot-Murray-Kynynmound, 4th Earl of Minto	Roley	Spy	M 0970	
6 Jul 1905	Thomas Rawle	The President of the Law Society	Spy	M 0971	
13 Jul 1905	Ernest Baggallay	A popular magistrate	Spy	M 0972	
20 Jul 1905	Léonce Albert Caillard	Vice-Admiral Caillard	GUTH	M 0973	
27 Jul 1905	Finley Peter Dunne	Mr Dooley	Spy	M 0974	
3 Aug 1905	Sir Antony MacDonnell	Sir Antony MacDonnell	Spy	M 0975	
10 Aug 1905	Edward Terry	A Mason of distinction	Spy	M 0976	
17 Aug 1905	Samuel Hope Morley	Samuel Hope Morley	Spy	M 0977	
24 Aug 1905	H. O. Arnold-Forster	The Heritage of Woe	Spy	M 0978	
31 Aug 1905	Henry Lucy	Toby MP	Spy	M 0979	
7 Sep 1905	Gen Aleksey Kuropatkin	I regret to report	jmp	M 0980	
14 Sep 1905	William Bass	Billy	Spy	M 0981	
21 Sep 1905	Thomas Brock	The Queen's memorial	Spy	M 0982	
28 Sep 1905	Reginald Rimington-Wilson	Driven grouse	Spy	M 0983	
5 Oct 1905	Edward Henry	Finger Prints	Spy	M 0984	
12 Oct 1905	Robert Marsham	Bow Street	Spy	M 0985	
19 Oct 1905	Thomas Bowles	An Encyclopaedia...	Spy	M 0986	
26 Oct 1905	Alexander Hood	The Princess's Private Secretary	Spy	M 0987	
2 Nov 1905	Leo Trevor	Leo	Spy	M 0988	
9 Nov 1905	Rupert Guinness	Rupert	Spy	M 0989	
16 Nov 1905	Weedon Grossmith	The Duffer	Spy	M 0990	
23 Nov 1905	Richard Verney, 19th Baron Willoughby de Broke	An MFH with a sense of humour	Spy	M 0991	
30 Nov 1905	Col Francis Onslow Barrington Foote	Military Music	Spy	M 0992	
7 Dec 1905	Group of hunters	A Fox Hunting Constellation	BEDE	WS; double print	
14 Dec 1905	Joseph Armitage Robinson, Dean of Westminster	An erudite Dean	Spy	M 0993	
20 Dec 1905	Count Albert Mensdorff	Austria in England	Spy	M 0994	
28 Cec 1905	George Bernard Shaw	Magnetic, he has the power to infect almost everyone with the delight that he takes in himself	Max	M 0995	
4 Jan 1906	Edgar Lubbock	The Master of the Blankney	BEDE	M 0996	
11 Jan 1906	William Galloway	He is very Affluent	Ruth	M 0997	
18 Jan 1906	Augustine Birrell	The Passive Resister's last hope	Spy	M 0998	
25 Jan 1906	Sir William Robson	The Solicitor General	Spy	M 0999	
1 Feb 1906	Arthur Wing Pinero	Though it is an arguable point whether he be, as it was once reputed, the most intellectual, he remains, beyond dispute, the dressiest of contemporary British dramatists	Bulbo	M 1000; GB Shaw in background	
8 Feb 1906	Keir Hardie	Queer Hardie	Spy	M 1001	
15 Feb 1906	Gen Sir Hugh Henry Gough	Keeper of the Crown Jewels	Spy	M 1002	
22 Feb 1906	Lord E. A. R. Cecil	So voluble an Advocate should become a successful Parliamentarian	Spy	M 1003	
1 Mar 1906	George Charles Fitzwilliam	Billy	Spy	M 1004; former mayor of Peterborough	
8 Mar 1906	W Boyd-Carpenter, Bishop of Ripon	A man Right Reverend and Well-Beloved	Spy	M 1005	
15 Mar 1906	Albert Brassey	The Master of the Heythrop	Spy	M 1006	
22 Mar 1906	Maj-Gen Sir Ronald Lane	Rowdy	Spy	M 1007	
29 Mar 1906	John Eldon Bankes	Good Form	Spy	M 1008	
5 April 1906	Robert Windsor-Clive, 1st Earl of Plymouth	Good Works	Spy	M 1009	
12 Apr 1906	Sir Thomas Barlow, 1st Baronet	Physician to His Majesty's Household	Spy	M 1010	
19 Apr 1906	Cosmo Gordon Lang, Bishop of Stepney	A Bishop of Decision	Spy	M 1011	
26 Apr 1906	John Henry Taylor	John Henry	Spy	M 1012	
5 May 1906	Lt-Col Charles Frederick St Clair Anstruther-Thomson	Commanding 2nd Life Guards	Spy	M 1013	
10 May 1906	Maj-Gen Sir Hugh McCalmont	Sir Hugh	Spy	M 1014	
17 May 1906	Thomas Scott-Ellis, 8th Baron Howard de Walden	He patronises literature and the turf, but does not waste his money	Spy	M 1015	
24 May 1906	Alfonso XIII of Spain		GUTH	M 1016	
31 May 1906	Victoria Eugenie of Battenberg	sketched at Kensington Palace May 1906	Leslie Ward		
6 Jun 1906	Richard Causton	A cheery Paymaster	Spy	M 1017	
14 Jun 1906	Lord Edmond Fitzmaurice	He does not under-estimate his own ability	Spy	M 1018	
21 Jun 1906	William Hall Walker	A Lucky Owner	Spy	M 1019	
28 Jun 1906	Felix Schuster	Free Trade and Finance	Spy	M 1020	
4 Jul 1906	George Duncan Rowe	A Celebrated Oarsman who prefers cricket to rowing and golf to both	Spy	M 1021	
11 Jul 1906	Tom Hayward	Tom	Spy	M 1022	
18 Jul 1906	Mr Reginald Spooner	Reggie	Spy	M 1023	
25 Jul 1906	Philip Stanhope, 1st Baron Weardale	A Cynical Radical	Spy	M 1024	
1 Aug 1906	George Osborne, 10th Duke of Leeds	Vice-commodore	Spy	M 1025	
8 Aug 1906	John Tyldesley	Forty-six centuries in eleven years	Spy	M 1026	
15 Aug 1906	Frank Gillingham	Cricketing Christianity	Spy	M 1027	
22 Aug 1906	Robert Maxwell	North Berwick	Spy	M 1028	
29 Aug 1906	Edward Peter Mathers	South Africa	Spy	M 1029	
5 Sep 1906	Maj Eustace Loder	Spearmint	Spy	M 1030	
12 Sep 1906	Bernard Dillon	Bernard	Spy	M 1031	
19 Sep 1906	Victor Bulwer-Lytton, 2nd Earl of Lytton	Victor	Spy	M 1032	
26 Sep 1906	Edgar Jacob, Bishop of St Albans	Tolerance	Spy	M 1033	
3 Oct 1906	Col Thomas Calley	1st Life Guards	Spy	M 1034	
10 Oct 1906	Adm Sir Compton Domvile	40 HP in a dingy	Spy	M 1035	
17 Oct 1906	Justice Reginald More Bray	A man of Law and Broad Acres	Spy	M 1036	
24 Oct 1906	James Lowther	Mr Speaker	Spy	M 1037	
31 Oct 1906	Reginald McKenna	In the winning Crew	Spy	M 1038	
7 Nov 1906	Arthur Templeman	A rising Star	Spy	M 1039	
14 Nov 1906	Silas Hocking	Silas Hocking	Spy	M 1040	
21 Nov 1906	William Higgs	Top of the List	Spy	M 1041	
28 Nov 1906	William Griggs	He rides for Lord Durham	Spy	M 1042	
5 Dec 1906	Evan Hanbury	Cottesmore	Spy	M 1043	
12 Dec 1906	Reginald Corbet	To the manner born	Spy	M 1044	
19 Dec 1906	James Joicey, 1st Baron Joicey	Collieries	Spy	M 1045	
26 Dec 1906	Capt J. R. Jellicoe	Naval Ordnance	Spy	M 1046	
2 Jan 1907	Sydney Buxton	The Postmaster General	Spy	M 1047	
9 Jan 1907	Gen Sir William Butler	a Radical General	Spy	M 1048	
16 Jan 1907	Frederick Smith	A Successful First Speech ("Moab is my Washpot")	Spy	M 1049	
23 Jan 1907	Arthur Lee	Our Army Critic	Spy	M 1050	
30 Jan 1907	Father Bernard John Vaughan	A Modern Savonarola	Spy	M 1051	
6 Feb 1907	CW Stubbs Bishop of Truro	A Most Select Preacher	Spy	M 1052	
13 Feb 1907	Charles Spencer, Baron Althorp	An Expert In Ceremony	Spy	M 1053	
20 Feb 1907	John Rees	Montgomery District	Spy	M 1054	
27 Feb 1907	William Gillette	Sherlock Holmes	Spy	M 1055	
6 Mar 1907	Charles FitzRoy, 4th Baron Southampton	The Sinner	Spy	M 1056	
13 Mar 1907	Douglas Stuart	Duggie	Spy	M 1057	
20 Mar 1907	Dudley FitzGerald-de Ros, 23rd Baron de Ros	The premier Baron	Spy	M 1058	
27 Mar 1907	Henry Biron	Worship Street	Spy	M 1059	
3 Apr 1907	Sir William Bull	Hammersmith	Spy	M 1060	
10 Apr 1907	Charles Russell	A Son of his Father	Spy	M 1061	
17 Apr 1907	Sir Henry Wood	Queen's Hall	Spy	M 1062	
24 Apr 1907	Henry Kemble	Hereditary Actor	Spy	M 1063	
1 May 1907	Sir Nicholas O'Conor	Diplomacy	Spy	M 1064	
8 May 1907	Charles Darling	Judicial Light Weight	Spy	M 1065	
15 May 1907	Pat O'Brien	United Ireland	Spy	M 1066	
22 May 1907	Canon Frederick Alfred John Hervey	Domestic Chaplain	Ao	M 1067	
29 May 1907	Gen Louis Botha	Uncle Louis	PYG	M 1068	
5 Jun 1907	John Henry Martin	Skeets	Ao	M 1069	
12 Jun 1907	Edmund Robertson	Admiralty	Spy	M 1070	
19 Jun 1907	Graham Auldjo Prentice	The Portly One	Spy	M 1071	
26 Jun 1907	James Braid	Jimmy	Spy	M 1072	
3 Jul 1907	Banner Johnstone	Bush	Spy	M 1073	
10 Jul 1907	Cyril Wells	Father	Spy	M 1074	
17 Jul 1907	Charles Harbord, 5th Baron Suffield	Suffield	Ao	M 1075	
24 Jul 1907	Harry Foster	The Fishermen's Friend	Spy	M 1076	
31 Jul 1907	Alfred Gwynne Vanderbilt	Alfred Gwynne Vanderbilt	Spy	M 1077	
7 Aug 1907	Sir Richard Williams-Bulkeley, 12th Baronet	Tiggy	Spy	M 1078	
14 Aug 1907	Kenneth Hutchings	A Century Maker	Spy	M 1079	
21 Aug 1907	Newton Wallop, 6th Earl of Portsmouth	The Demon	Spy	M 1080	
28 Aug 1908	Sir John Thursby	JOS	Spy	M 1081	
4 Sep 1907	Walter Buckmaster	Buck	Spy	M 1082	
11 Sep 1907	Charles Wynn-Carington, 1st Earl Carrington	Small holdings	Spy	M 1083	
18 Sep 1907	Sir Alfred Fripp	A Master of the knife	Spy	M 1084	
25 Sep 1907	Charles Finch, 8th Earl of Aylesford	Charlie Aylesford	Ao	M 1085	
2 Oct 1907	Marquess de Soveral	Unlike Wilkes, who was only half-an-hour behind the handsomest man in Europe, M de Soveral is usually a minute or two ahead of him	Ruth	M 1086	
9 Oct 1907	Thomas Macnamara	The School Master	Spy	M 1087	
16 Oct 1907	Sir Alfred Lawrence	Lorry	Spy	M 1088	
23 Oct 1907	Hugh Lea	East St Pancras	Spy	M 1089	
30 Oct 1907	Samuel Fay	Great Central	Spy	M 1090	
6 Nov 1907	Frederic Coleman	Steam	Spy	M 1091	
13 Nov 1907	David Lloyd George	A Nonconformist Genius	Spy	M 1092	
20 Nov 1907	James Buchanan	Whisky and Horses	Spy	M 1093	
27 Nov 1907	Mr Thomas Warrington	very Sound Judge	Spy	M 1094	
4 Dec 1907	Lt-Gen Sir George Luck	A Keeper of the Tower	Spy	M 1095	
11 Dec 1907	Frank Hedges Butler	The Air	Spy	M 1096;	
18 Dec 1907	George Thursby	Mr George	Spy	M 1097	
25 Dec 1907	Gerald du Maurier	Gerald	Spy	M 1098	
1 Jan 1908	Peter Gilpin	Condition	Spy	M 1099; trainer of Pretty Polly and Spearmint	
8 Jan 1908	John Rawlinson	Eton and Cambridge	Spy	M 1100	
15 Jan 1908	Edward Fordham	North London	Spy	M 1101	
22 Jan 1908	Grand Duke Michael Michaelovitch of Russia	Michael	Spy	M 1102	
29 Jan 1908	Joseph Chamberlain	War-Worn	WHO	M 1103	
5 Feb 1908	Sir Edward Edgcumbe	Small freeholds	Spy	M 1104	
12 Feb 1908	Sir Samuel Evans	Sam	Spy	M 1105	
19 Feb 1908	Antonino Paternò-Castello, marchese di San Giuliano	The Italian Ambassador	Spy	M 1106	
26 Feb 1908	George Elliott	George	Spy	M 1107	
4 Mar 1908	William Watson-Armstrong, 1st Baron Armstrong	The Ogre	Spy	M 1108	
11 Mar 1908	James Inglis	Great Western	Spy	M 1109	
18 Mar 1908	G. P. Huntley	GP	Spy	M 1110	
25 Mar 1908	Sir Boverton Redwood, 1st Baronet	Petroleum	Spy	M 1111	
1 Apr 1908	Oliver Bury	Great Northern	Spy	M 1112	
8 Apr 1908	Peter Mackie	Restless Peter	Spy	M 1113	
15 Apr 1908	John Lumley-Savile, 2nd Baron Savile	Rufford Abbey	Spy	M 1114	
22 Apr 1908	David Jardine	Davie	Spy	M 1115	
29 Apr 1908	Mark Hambourg	Impromptu	Spy	M 1116	
6 May 1908	Sir Thomas Wrightson, 1st Baronet	Tariff Reform	Spy	M 1117	
13 May 1908	Mark Twain	Below the Mark	Spy	M 1118; Mark Twain	
20 May 1908	Allan Aynesworth	Tony	Spy	M 1119	
27 May 1908	Georges Clemenceau	The Little Great Premier	Vanitas	M 1120	
3 Jun 1908	Sir Daniel Cooper, 2nd Baronet	Dan	Spy	M 1121	
10 Jun 1908	A. E. W. Mason	Four Feathers	Max	M 1122	
17 Jun 1908	Sir David Salomans	Electricity	Spy	M 1123	
24 Jun 1908	Frank Curzon	The Gaffer	Spy	M 1124	
1 Jul 1908	Bernard Forbes, 8th Earl of Granard	Master of the Horse	Spy	M 1125	
8 Jul 1908	Alfred Hales	Peace and War	Spy	M 1126	
15 Jul 1908	Gen Sir Arthur Paget	Soudan	Spy	M 1127	
22 Jul 1908	Maurice Maeterlinck	The Belgian Poet	Max	M 1128	
29 Jul 1908	Benjamin Tillett and J Ward	Labour Men	Spy	M 1129	
5 Aug 1908	Raymond Etherington-Smith	Ethel	Spy	M 1130	
12 Aug 1908	James Lindsay, 26th Earl of Crawford	The Transit of Venus	Spy	M 1131	
19 Aug 1908	Sir Melville Macnaghten	Scotland Yard	Spy	M 1132	
26 Aug 1908	Sir Thomas Shaughnessy	The Canadian Pacific	Spy	M 1133	
2 Sep 1908	Alfred Deakin	Australia	Spy	M 1134	
9 Sep 1908	Abe Bailey	Rhodes the Second	Spy	M 1135	
16 Sep 1908	Edward Turnour, 6th Earl Winterton	A Stickler	Spy	M 1136	
23 Sep 1908	Charles Bright	Submarine Telegraphs	Spy	M 1137	
30 Sep 1908	Alfred Bird	A Midland Imperialist	Spy	M 1138	
7 Oct 1908	Jean Jaurés	A Great French Orator	GUTH	M 1139	
14 Oct 1908	Thomas Legh, 2nd Baron Newton	An Imperialist without Guile	Spy	M 1140	
21 Oct 1908	Christopher Furness, 1st Baron Furness	The Furness Line	Spy	M 1141	
28 Oct 1908	Leo Richardson	The Official Assignee	WHO	M 1142	
4 Nov 1908	Sir George Truscott	The Lord Mayor	Spy	M 1143	
8 Nov 1908	Elemir Bourges	An Artist in Words	GUTH	M 1144	
11 Nov 1908	Guy Granet	The Midland	Spy	M 1145	
18 Nov 1908	Lady Dorothy Nevill	Lady Dorothy Nevill	WHO	M 1146	
11 Nov 1908	Michael Bass, 1st Baron Burton	Burton	Spy	M 1147	
2 Dec 1908	Sir William Ramsay	Chemistry	Spy	M 1148	
9 Dec 1908	Prince Alexander of Teck	HSH Prince Alexander of Teck	Spy	M 1149	
16 Dec 1908	Alfred Chichele Plowden	Wit and Wisdom	Spy	M 1150	
23 Dec 1908	Isadore de Lara	A Great English Composer		M 1151	
30 Dec 1908	Paul Nelka	Options	ELF	M 1152	
6 Jan 1909	Basil Wilberforce	The Chaplain	Spy	M 1153; Chaplain to the House of Commons	
13 Jan 1909	Bernard Coleridge, 2nd Baron Coleridge	The Silver Voiced	Spy	M 1154	
20 Jan 1909	George Alexander	The St James's	Max	M 1155	
27 Jan 1909	Edwyn Scudamore-Stanhope, 10th Earl of Chesterfield	A Dandy	Spy	M 1156	
3 Feb 1909	Sir Clifton Robinson	Electric Traction	Spy	M 1157	
10 Feb 1909	Col Frank Shuttleworth	Charlie	Spy	M 1158	
17 Feb 1909	Sir Horace Regnart	Sir Horace JP	Spy	M 1159	
24 Feb 1909	John Singer Sargent	A Great Realist	Max	M 1160	
3 Mar 1909	Sir Colin Keppel	Commodore HM's Yachts	Spy	M 1161	
10 Mar 1909	James Horlick	Malted Milk	Spy	M 1162	
17 Mar 1909	Carl Meyer	CM	Spy	M 1163	
24 Mar 1909	Frederick Benson	Swansea Harbour	WHO	M 1164	
31 Mar 1909	Sir Theodore Fry	Not a Small Fry	Spy	M 1165	
7 Apr 1909	Harry Mallaby-Deeley	The Prince of Prince's	Spy	M 1166	
14 Apr 1909	Sir John Scott, 1st Baronet of Connaught Place	The Wallace Collection	WHO	M 1167	
21 Apr 1909	James Burns, 3rd Baron Inverclyde	Jim	Spy	M 1168	
28 Apr 1909	Walter Bulkeley Barrington, 9th Viscount Barrington	Lord Barrington	Spy	M 1169	
5 May 1909	James Hozier, 2nd Baron Newlands	Jim	Spy	M 1170	
12 May 1909	John Reid Walker	John	Spy	M 1171	
19 May 1909	Edward Hemmerde KC	The New Recorder	Spy	M 1172	
26 May 1909	Sir Maurice Fitzgerald, 20th Knight of Kerry	Knight of Kerry	Spy	M 1173	
2 Jun 1909	Sir Arthur Lucas, 2nd Baronet	Arthur	ELF	M 1174	
9 Jun 1909	Walter Winans	Tracks and Triggers	WHO	M 1175	
16 Jun 1909	Robert Garnett Tatlow	Finance and Fruit	Spy	M 1176	
23 Jun 1909	Sir Gilbert Parker	The member for Great Britain	Spy	M 1177	
30 Jun 1909	Alfred Curnick	Alfred	Spy	M 1178	
7 Jul 1909	George, Baron de Reuter	The Wicked Baron	Spy	M 1179	
14 Jul 1909	Sir John Courteney	A City Liberal	Spy	M 1180; Chairman, City Liberal Association	
21 Jul 1909	W Gardner Sinclair	Beer, Budget and Brains	Spy	M 1181	
28 Jul 1909	Ernest Palmer	Patron's Fund	ELF	M 1182	
4 Aug 1909	Alexander Forbes-Leith, 1st Baron Leith of Fyvie	Fyvie	Spy	M 1183	
11 Aug 1909	Anatole France	The Greatest Living Frenchman	GUTH	M 1184	
8 Aug 1909	Capt Thomas Malcolm Harvey Kincaid-Smith	National Military Training	Spy	M 1185	
25 Aug 1909	James Campbell	The Rt Hon James	Spy	M 1186	
1 Sep 1909	Harding Cox	Cockie	KITE	M 1187	
8 Sep 1909	Frank Wootton	Frank Wootton	Spy	M 1188	
	Minoru	Minoru	Percy Earl	H 01	
15 Sep 1909	Cathcart Wason	Orkney and Shetland	WHO	M 1189	
15 Sep 1909	Bayardo	Bayardo	Percy Earl	H 02	
22 Sep 1909	Raymond Blathwayt	A Good Listener	Spy	M 1190	
22 Sep 1909	Cyllene	Cyllene	Percy Earl	H 03	
29 Sep 1909	Sir John Jackson	Docks and Harbours	Spy	M 1191	
29 Sep 1909	Dean Swift	Dean Swift	Percy Earl	H 04	
6 Oct 1909	Ernest Shackleton	The South Pole	KITE	M 1192	
6 Oct 1909	Dr Henry Lunn	The King of Clubs	ELF	M 1193	
13 Oct 1909	Sir Edward Walker	ED	Quip	M 1194; Mayor of Darlington and owner of the Northern Echo	
13 Oct 1909	Lutteur III	Lutteur III	Emil Adam	H 05; winner of the 1909 Grand National	
20 Oct 1909	Sir Robert Jardine, 2nd Baronet	Willie	ELF	M 1195; Head of Jardine Matheson	
20 Oct 1909	Sceptre and Maid of Corinth	Sceptre and Maid of Corinth	Percy Earl	H 06	
27 Oct 1909	John Dodson, 2nd Baron Monk Bretton	The Private Secretary	Spy	M 1196	
27 Oct 1909	Pretty Polly	Pretty Polly	Percy Earl	H 07	
3 Nov 1909	W. S. Fielding MP	Canadian Finance	WHO	M 1197	
3 Nov 1909	St Simon	St Simon	Percy Earl	H 08	
10 Nov 1909	Manuel II of Portugal	Europe's Youngest Monarch	Nibs	M 1198	
17 Nov 1909	Col W. J. Bosworth	The Colonel	ELF	M 1199; Chairman, The Automobile Association	
11 Nov 1909	Rock Sand	Rock Sand	Percy Earl	H 09	
24 Nov 1909	Sir Charles Friswell	Frizzy	HCO	M 1200; Chairman, Standard Motor Company	
24 Nov 1909	Persimmon	Persimmon	Percy Earl	H 10	
1 Dec 1909	Sir Osmond Williams, 1st Baronet	The Champion of the Ladies	HCO	M 1201	
1 Dec 1909	Flying Fox	Flying Fox	Percy Earl	H 11	
8 Dec 1909	H. A. Barker	Bones	ELF	M 1202	
16 Dec 1909	Sir Archibald Williamson MP	Moray and Nairn	HCO	M 1203	
23 Dec 1909	Harold Tennant	Dangerous Trades	Spy	M 1204	
23 Dec 1909	Col. Hildred Carlile	Mid Herts	ELF	M 1205	
30 Dec 1909	Frederick Leverton Harris	MP for Stepney	Spy	M 1206	
30 Dec 1909	Douglas Vickers	Brightside DV	Spy	M 1207	

Next List of Vanity Fair (British magazine) caricatures (1910-1914)
