= Ernie Collins =

Ernie Collins may refer to:

- Ernie Collins (musician), on Temptation (Shelby Lynne album) and other works
- Ernie Collins, a character in 3:10 to Yuma (1957 film)

== See also ==
- Ernest Collins (1851–1914), British water engineer
- Earnest Collins Jr., American college football coach
