= Esquire Shoe Polish =

Shoe polish brand

Esquire Shoe Polish was the best selling shoe polish brand in America from the 1940s to the 1960s.

== Background ==
During the Great Depression, Sam and Albert Abrams, chemists and entrepreneurs from Brooklyn, took over an ailing boot polish maker, the Knomark Manufacturing Company of Williamsburg, Brooklyn. In 1938 they purchased the Esquire brand.

After a saturation advertising campaign in 1944, the company became the best selling shoe polish manufacturer in the US. A 1951 advertising campaign featured the singer and television star Kate Smith. In the late 1950s, they sold Knomark and the 1914-built Esquire Building on 330 Wythe Avenue in Brooklyn.

== Acquisitions ==
In 1957, Revlon acquired Knomark, including the Esquire brand. Revlon sold Knomark in 1969, and after a period as a subsidiary of the Papercraft Corp., Knomark became a subsidiary of the Sara Lee company, which owned several other polish brands including Kiwi.

After federal regulators became concerned about Sara Lee's monopoly power, it divested itself of Knomark, selling the company and Esquire Brand. The Esquire trademark is currently owned by Griffin Brands, Inc., although the company does not appear to be marketing products under that name.

The Esquire Building was acquired in 1984 and converted to condominiums by Stephanie Eisenberg in 2000.
