= Shoe polish =

Product for leather care

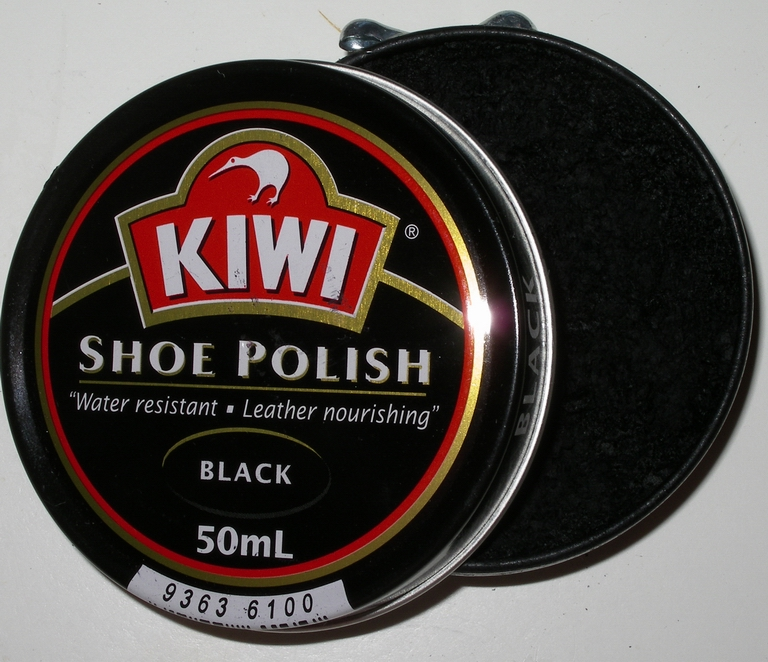
An open can of shoe polish with a side-mounted opening mechanism visible at the top of the photo

Shoe polish, also known as boot polish and shoeshine, is a waxy paste, cream, or liquid that is used to polish, shine, and waterproof leather shoes or boots to extend the footwear's lifespan and restore its appearance. Shoe polishes are distinguished by their textures, which range from liquids to hard waxes. Solvent, waxes, and colorants comprise most shoe polishes. Shoe polishes that would be recognizable today have been around since the Middle Ages. Originally made with dubbin, they were only used to soften leather and weather proof shoes, they did not shine shoes. However, the popularity of shoe shining that arose during the early 1900s led to many shoe polish formulas being incorporated with a shining agent.

== Types ==
Shoe polish can be classified into three types: wax, cream-emulsion, and liquid. Each differs in detailed composition, but all consist of a mixture of waxes, solvents and often include colorants or dyes.

=== Wax-based shoe polish ===
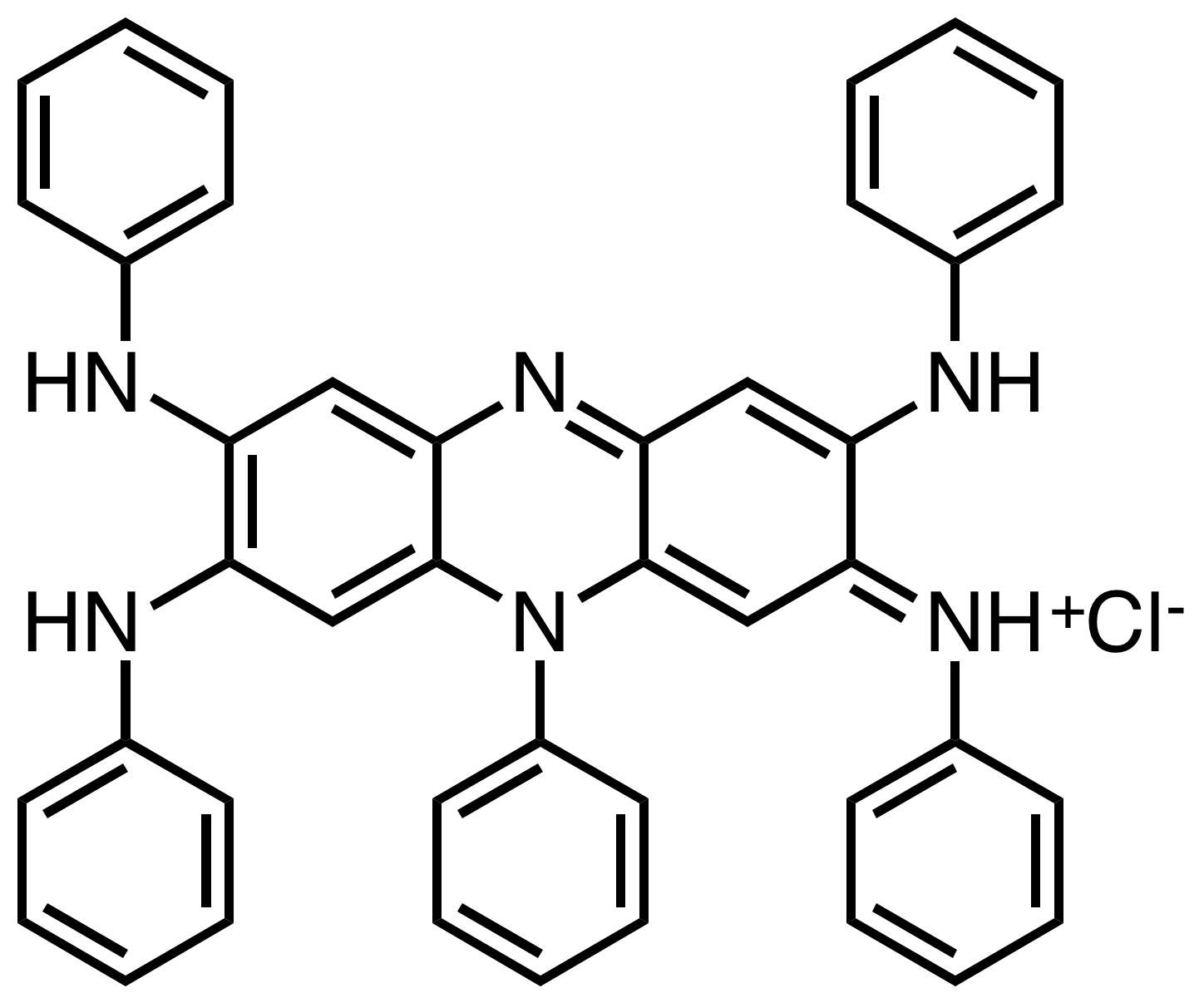
Nigrosin is a common dye in black shoe polish.

Waxes, organic solvents, and colorant (either soluble dyes or pigment) compose this type of polish. Waxes are 20–40% of the material. Natural waxes used for the polish include carnauba and montan as well as synthetic waxes. The composition determines the hardness and polishing properties after solvent has evaporated. Solvents are selected to match the waxes. About 70% of shoe polish is solvent. A variety of solvents are used, including naphtha. Turpentine, although more expensive, is favored for its "shoe polish odor". Dyes make up the final 2–3% of the polish. A traditional dye is nigrosine, but other dyes (including azo dyes) and pigments are used for oxblood, cordovan, and brown polishes.

Owing to its high content of volatile solvents, wax-based shoe polish hardens after application, while retaining its gloss. Poorly blended polishes are known to suffer from blooming, evidenced by the appearance of a white coating of stearin on the polish surface.

=== Cream-emulsion shoe polish ===
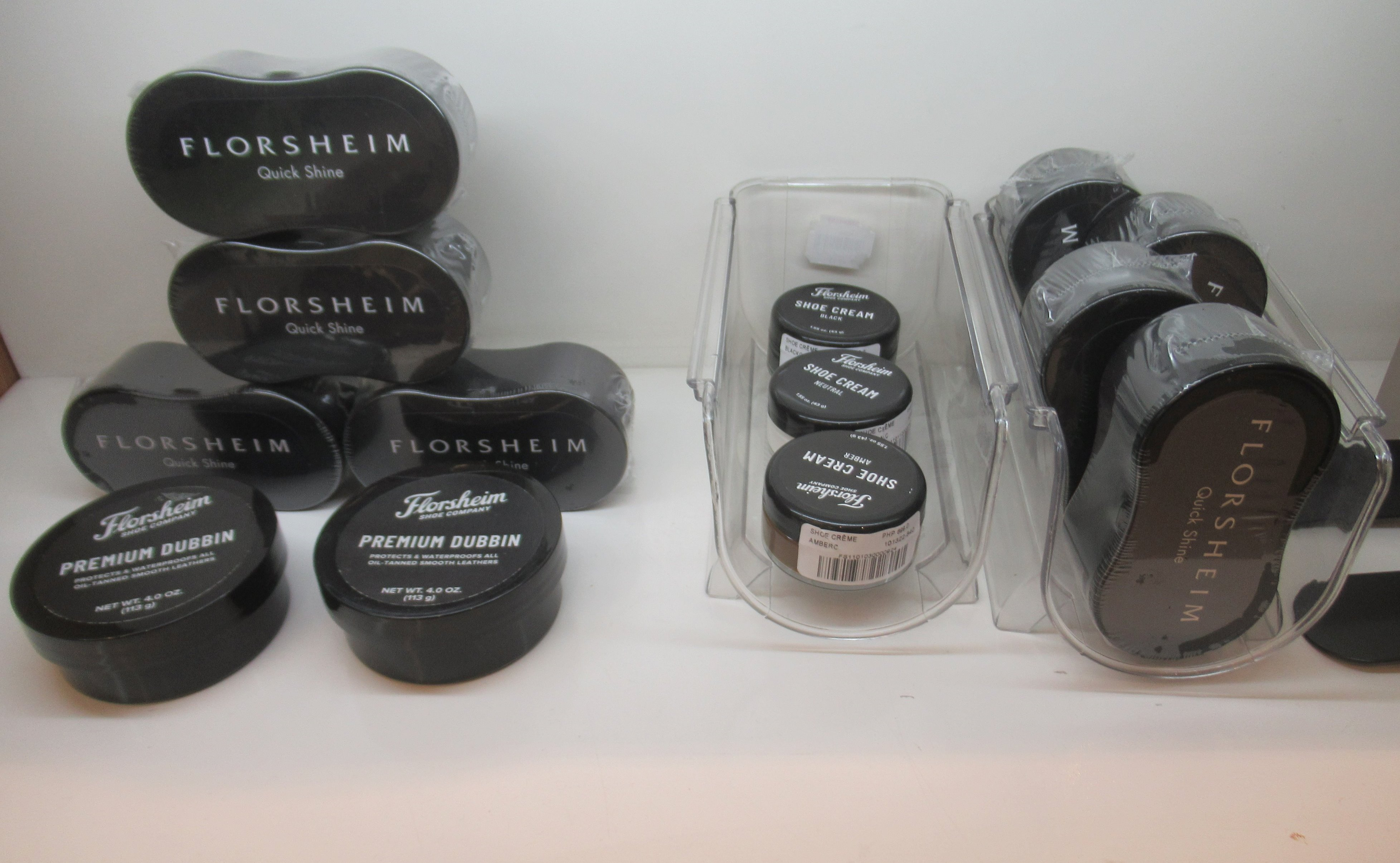
Florsheim cream & dubbin polish

These polishes may have a gelatinous consistency. They are composed of the usual three components: waxes, liquid vehicle, and dyes. Unlike wax-based shoe polishes, cream-emulsions contain water and/or oil plus a solvent (either naphtha, turpentine or Stoddard Solution), so the liquid content is high. Emulsifiers and surfactants are required. These include ammonia, morpholine, and various ethoxylated surfactants such as polysorbate 80. The waxes are often some mixture of carnauba wax, beeswax, montan wax and its oxidized derivatives, and paraffin waxes.

=== Liquid shoe polish ===
Liquid shoe polish is sold in a squeezable plastic bottle, with a small sponge applicator at the end. To decrease its viscosity, bottled polish usually has a very low wax content. Liquid shoe polish is a complex mixture. Polyethylene wax emulsion is a major component. Various polymers, typically acrylates, are the next major component, conferring gloss and holding the dyes in suspension. Resins and casein are selected to ensure adhesion to the leather. Fatty phosphate esters, emulsifiers, and glycols are also used. Pigments include titanium dioxide for whites and iron oxides for browns. Although liquid polish can put a fast shine on shoes, many experts warn against its long-term use because it can cause the leather to dry out and crack.

== Manufacture ==
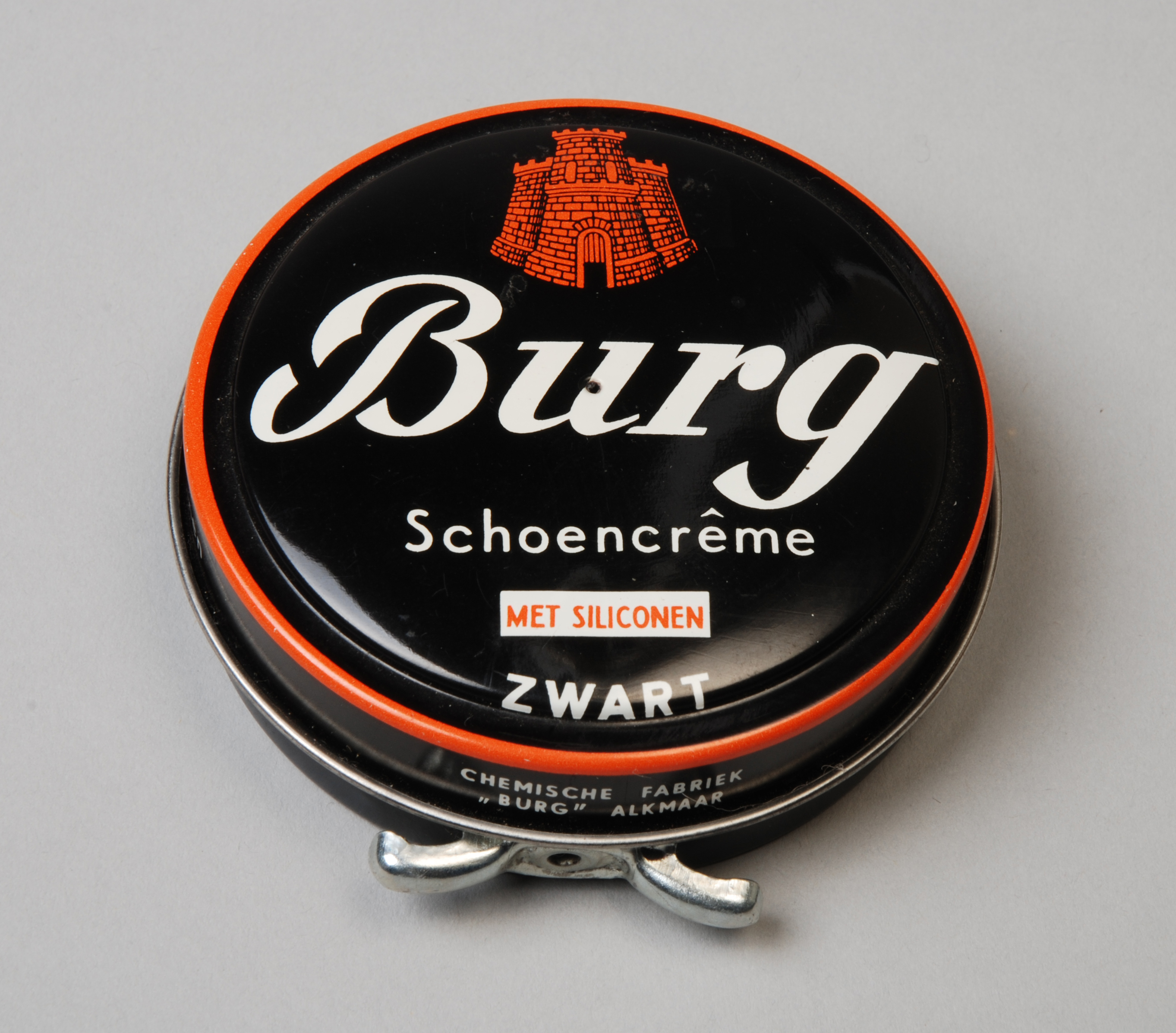
A 2-ounce tin of Burg black shoe polish

The process for producing shoe polish is very straightforward and the required equipment is relatively easy to acquire. The cost of establishing shoe polish manufacturing facilities has been estimated at $600,000 (as of 2005).

Shoe polish is manufactured in large, thermo-stated, stirred reactors. Steps are taken to ensure that volatile solvents do not evaporate. Typically, low-melting paraffin wax is melted, followed by the higher melting waxes, and finally the colorant-stearate mixture. The molten mass is added to warm solvent before being dispensed. Wax-based shoe polish is traditionally packaged in flat, round, 60-gram (2-ounce) tins, usually with an easy-open facility. The traditional flat, round tins have since become synonymous with shoe polishes. When dried due to solvent loss or other reasons, the hardened wax pulls away from the walls of the container, giving what is known as a "rattler".

== History ==
=== Before the twentieth century ===
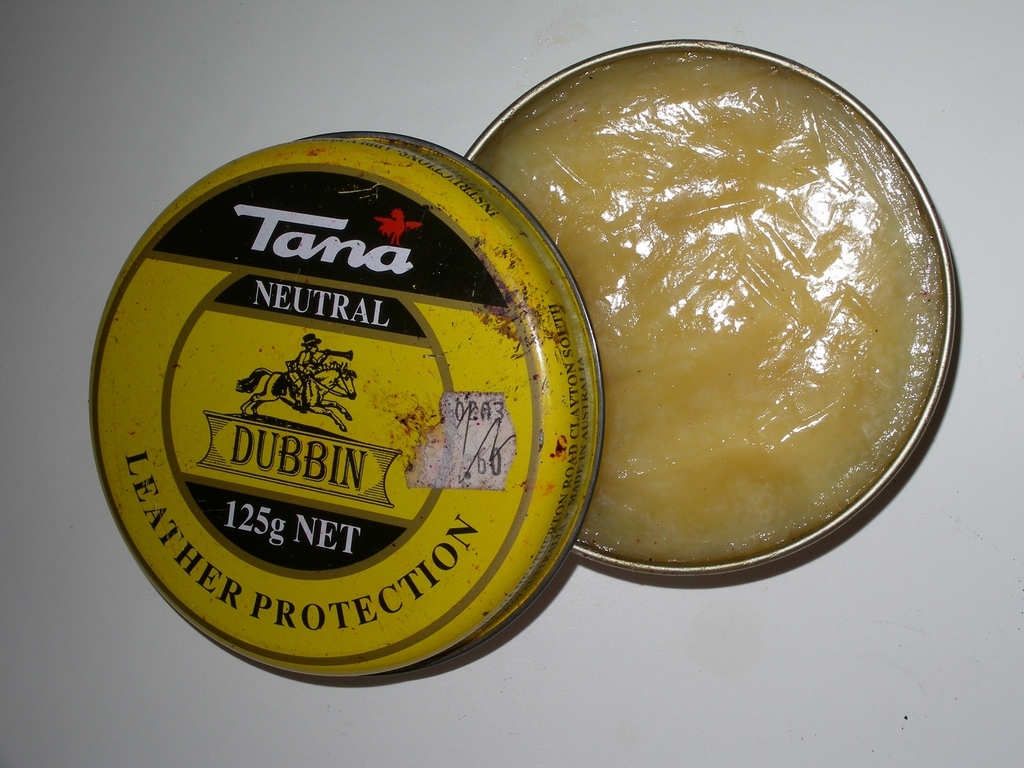
An open can of dubbin

Treating footwear to soften, waterproof, protect, and extend its lifespan is an ancient tradition as textile and clothmaking. Ancient peoples would use natural waxes, animal fats, and plant-based oils based on their availability to achieve their desired effects. However, these treatments were not generally meant to shine the shoe.

In the Middle Ages, dubbin, a product of wax, was often used to soften and waterproof leather; but it did not impart shine. It was made from natural wax, oil, soda ash, and tallow. As leather with a high natural veneer became popular in the 18th century, a high glossy finish became important, particularly on shoes and boots. In most cases, homemade polishes were used to provide this finish, often with lanolin or beeswax as a base.

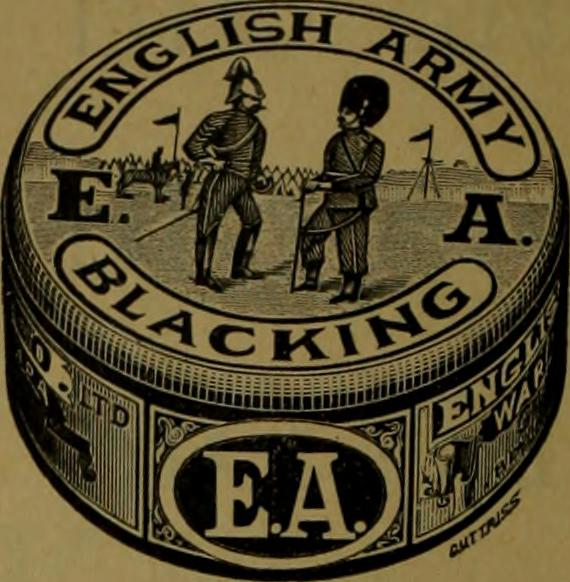
English Army Blacking from 1895

In the late 18th and early 19th century, many forms of shoe polish became available, yet were rarely referred to as shoe polish or boot polish. Instead, they were often called blacking, especially when mixed with lampblack, or still were referred to as dubbin. Tallow, an animal by-product, was used to manufacture a simple form of shoe polish at this time. In Chicago, where 82% of the processed meat consumed in the United States was processed, stockyards became a major shoe polish producing area.

Thomas and Jonathan Warren started making blacking around 1795–98 in London, initially in partnership with, and then competing against other companies. Jonathan Warren's Blacking company is noted as the first employer of Charles Dickens, aged 12 in 1823. The Warren company's chief competitor was the Day & Martin company formed in 1801.

Details of the operation of Day & Martin in 1842 reveal that the blacking they produced was in two forms, bottled liquid, and a thick paste which was available in either small wide-mouthed stone tubs, slabs wrapped in oiled paper, or in "circular tin-boxes, about three inches in diameter, and half or three-quarters of an inch thick.". Tinned blacking paste was at this time exclusively for army use: "[…] a bottle of liquid blacking would be rather a burden […] yet, as the soldier's boots or shoes must to some extent emulate the brightness and glitter of the boots of those who pay for battles instead of fighting them, a portable blacking apparatus is provided.".

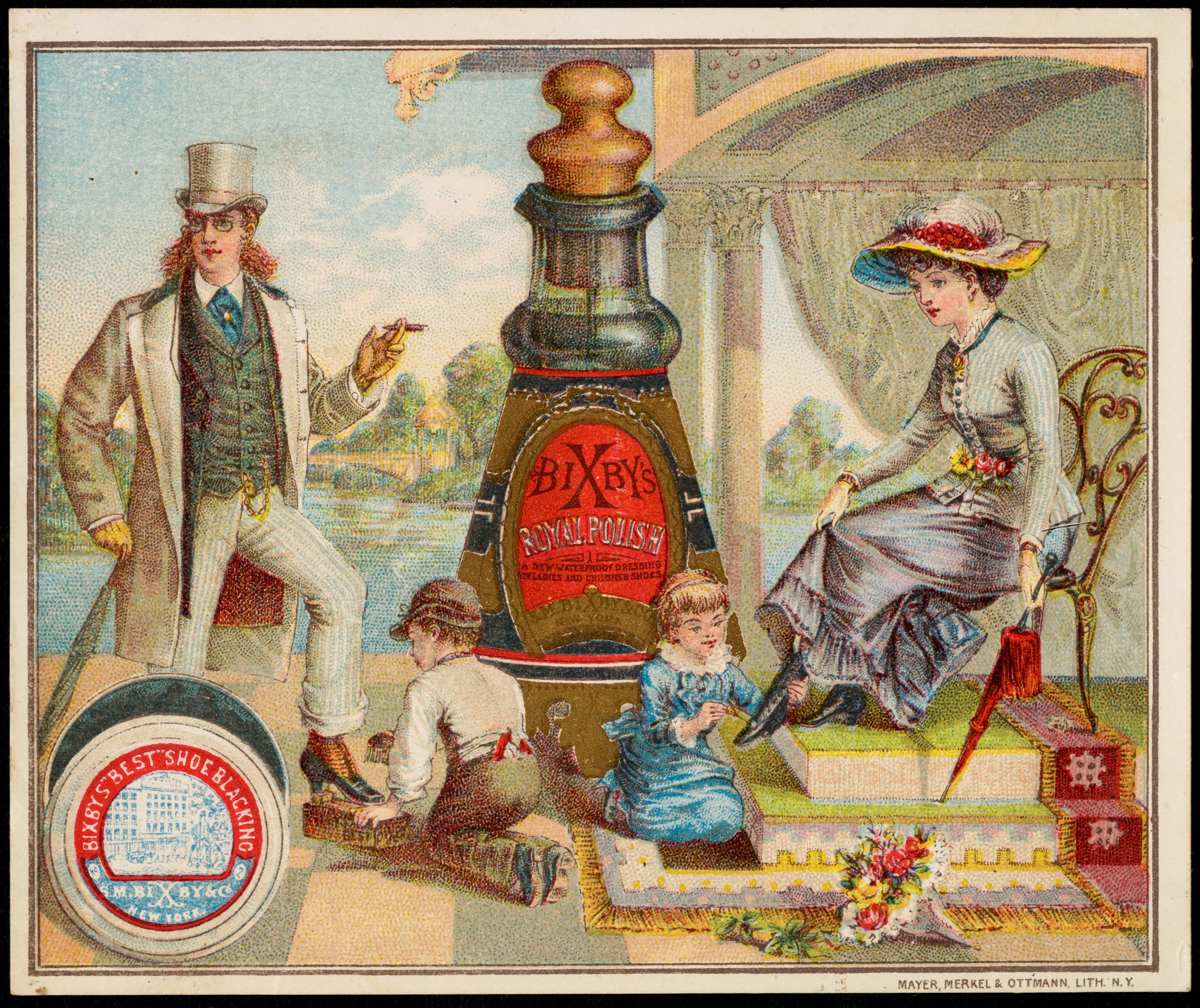
Bixbys "best" shoeblacking, Bixby's Royal Polish, ca. 1870–1900; from the 19th Century American Trade Cards collection of the Boston Public Library

In 1832, James S. Mason of Philadelphia began the commercial production of shoe blacking and inks. In 1851, James S. Mason & Co. constructed a building where 200 employees would produce 10 million boxes to hold blacking product tins annually. The tins would eventually be labeled, Mason Shoe Polish. This business shuttered in 1919 and the building was razed in 1973.

In 1851, the Irish brand Punch was introduced as another leather preserving product.

In 1889, William Edward Wren, started making shoe polishes and dubbin in England under the brand name Wren's. The company was awarded the First in the Field – First Award at the 1892 Leather Trades Exhibition in Northampton. A 1947 advertisement for Wren's would claim that William Wren originated the first wax polish in 1889. The advertisement was endorsed with the Royal Warrant, giving the claim creditability.

In 1890, the Kroner Brothers established EOS, a shoe polish factory in Berlin that serviced the Prussian military. It was closed in 1934 when the Nazis forbade Jews to operate a business.

=== Modern polish ===
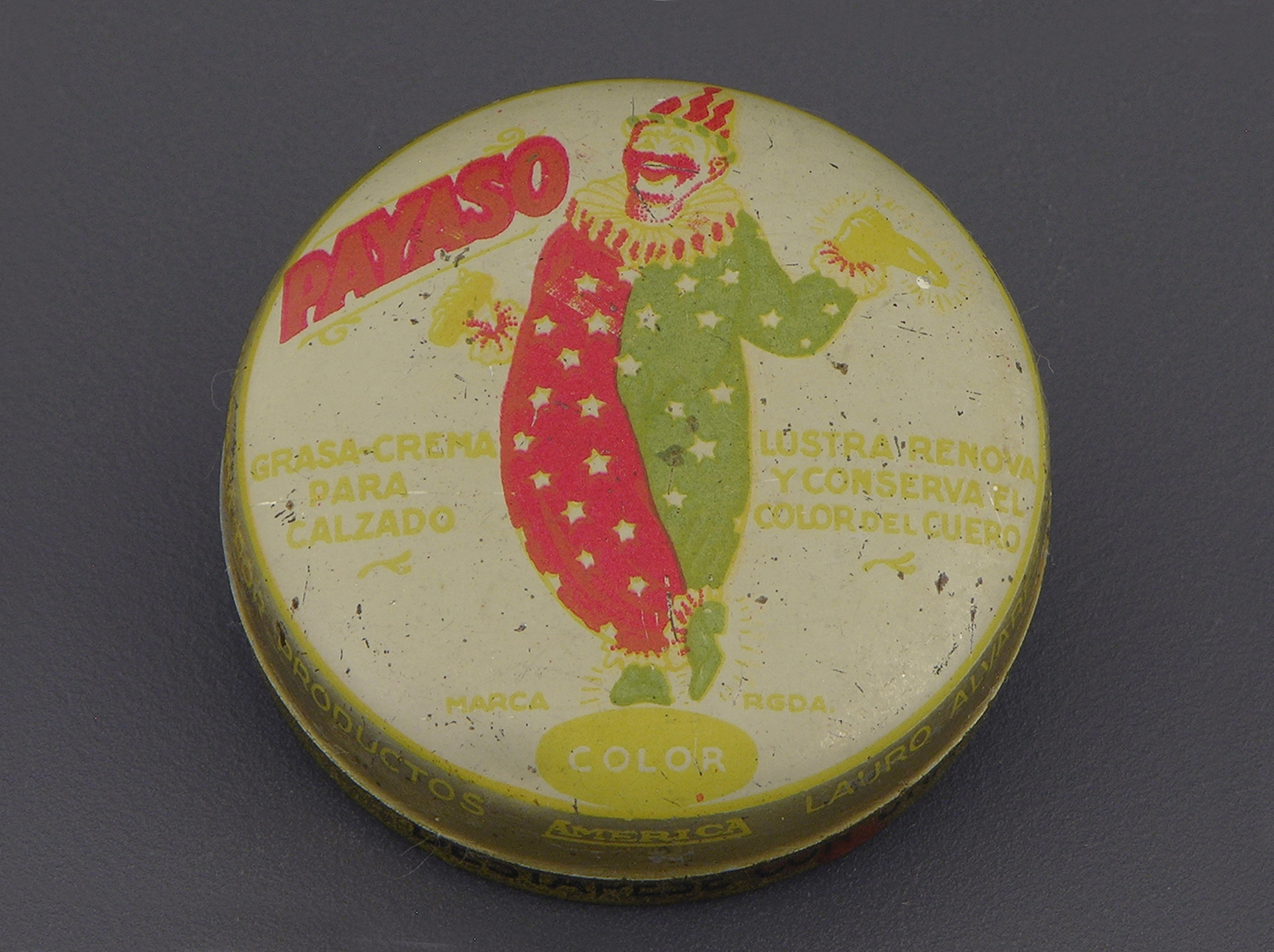
Payaso (clown) brand shoe polish from mid 20th-century Mexico, part of the permanent collection of the Museo del Objeto del Objeto.

The first shoe polishes aimed primarily at inducing shine were the British and British Commonwealth brands like Cherry Blossom, Kiwi, and Wren's.

While the oldest brand is believed to be Wren's, Kiwi is arguably the best known. Scottish expatriates William Ramsay and Hamilton McKellan began making "boot polish" in a small factory in 1904 in Melbourne, Australia. Their formula was a major improvement on previous brands as it preserved shoe leather, shined, and restored colour. Ramsay named the shoe polish after the kiwi, the national bird of New Zealand; Ramsay's wife, Annie Elizabeth Meek Ramsay, was a native of Oamaru, New Zealand. It has been suggested that, at a time when several symbols were weakly associated with New Zealand, the eventual spread of Kiwi shoe polish around the world enhanced the kiwi's popular appeal and promoted it at the expense of the others. Kiwi Dark Tan's release in 1908 incorporated agents that also added suppleness and water resistance. As black and a range of colors came available, exports to Britain, continental Europe, and New Zealand began. The polish is now made in Asia. The Sara Lee Corporation took ownership of the brand in 1984 until it was sold to SC Johnson, in 2011.

A Kiwi brand rival in the early years was Cobra Boot Polish, based in Sydney, Australia. Cobra was noted for a series of cartoon advertisements starting in 1909 in The Sydney Bulletin. They featured a character named "Chunder Loo of Akim Foo." It is believed the Australian slang word for vomiting, "chunder," could have originated through the rhyming slang of "Chunder Loo" and "spew," another slang word for vomit.

=== Surge in popularity ===
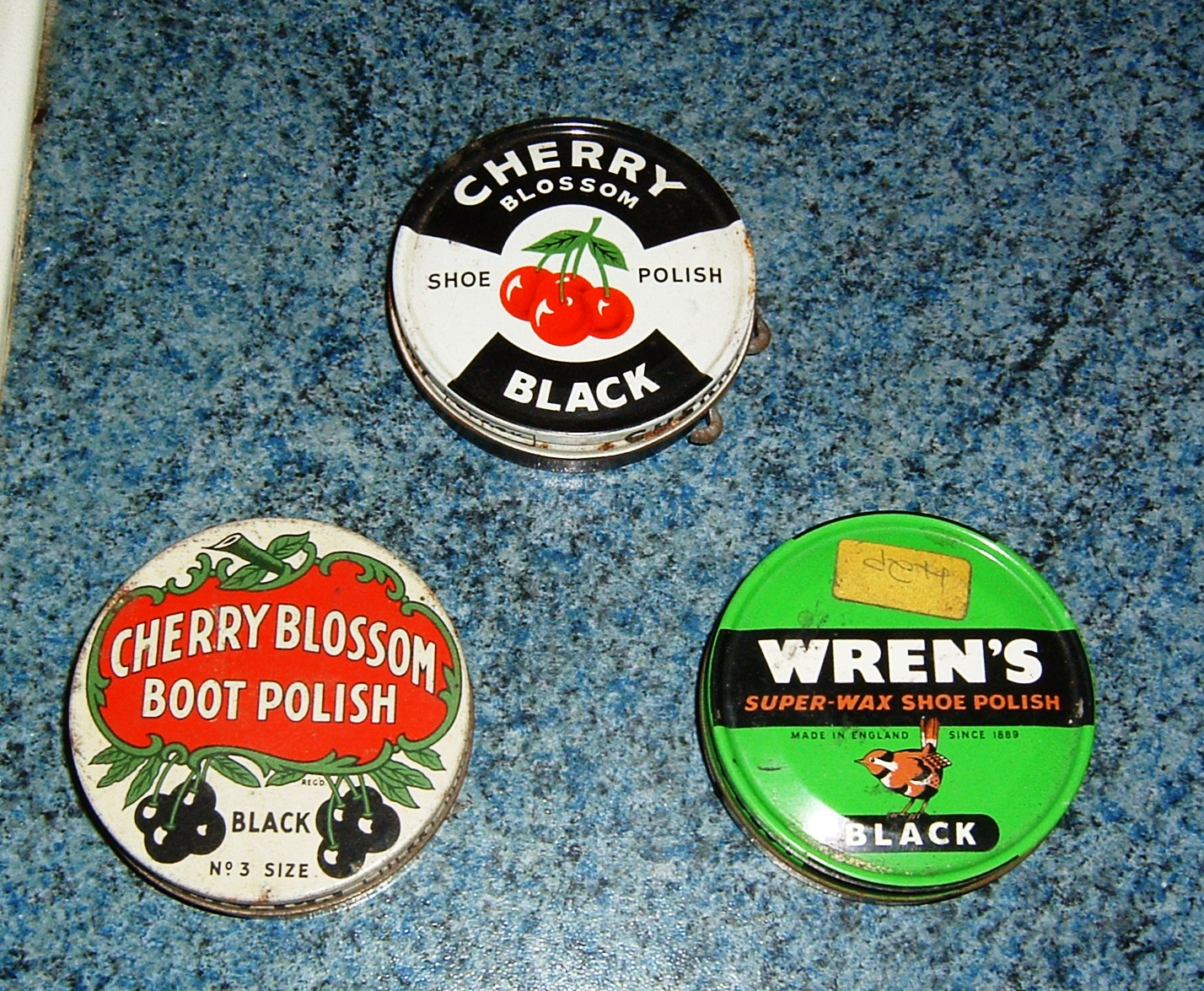
Three common types of British shoe polish of the 1960s or 1970s: two different versions of Cherry Blossom and a version of Wren's

Shoe manufacturing improvements in the mid-19th century as part of the Industrial Revolution allowed for factories to produce large numbers of shoes made of leather, and later synthetic materials. This increase in leather shoe production continued well into the 20th century and led to a surge in the number of retail shoe stores in the industrialized world, and a subsequent call for shoe polish by footwear consumers. The outbreak of World War I in 1914, with its high demand for large numbers of polished military boots, surged market demand for a product that would allow boots to be polished quickly and easily. Polish also started to be used on leather belts, holsters, and horse tack, further increasing the demand. Used by Australian troops during WWI, Kiwi shoe polish spread throughout the British Commonwealth countries and the United States. Its spread invited rival brands such as Shinola and Cavalier (United States), Cherry Blossom (United Kingdom), Parwa (India), Jean Bart (France), and others.

Advertising became more prominent; many shoe polish brands used fictional figures or historical characters for their branding. The 1927 German documentary Berlin: Symphony of a Metropolis, has a scene focuses on shoe shining with a polish called Nigrin, which sports the face of a black person.

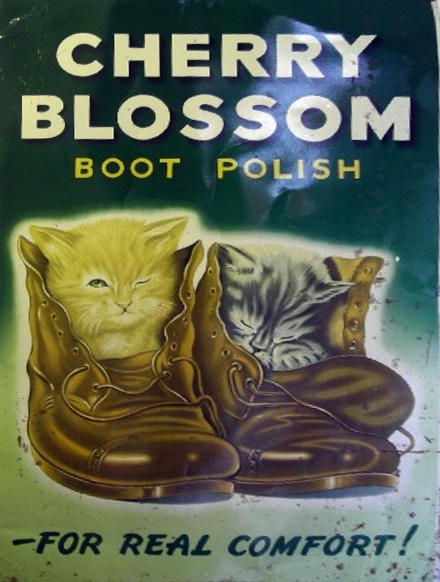
1930s British advertisement for Cherry Blossom boot polish

Shoe polish remained an essential item by World War II and was found just about everywhere Allied troops ventured. American war correspondent Walter Graeber wrote for TIME magazine from the Tobruk trenches in 1942 that "old tins of British-made Kiwi polish lay side by side with empty bottles of Chianti." A story indicative of the rise in global significance of shoe polish is told by Jean (Gertrude) Williams, a New Zealander who lived in Japan during the Allied occupation. They explained that American soldiers were then finding the dullness of their boots and shoes to be a handicap when trying to win the affections of Japanese women. U.S. military footwear of the time was produced in brown leather with the rough side out.

When the British Commonwealth Occupation Forces arrived in Japan—all with boots polished to a degree not known in the U.S. forces—the G.I.s were more conscious than ever of their feet. The secret was found to rest not only in spit and polish, but in the superior Australian boot polish, a commodity which was soon exchanged with the Americans on a fluctuating basis of so many packets of cigarettes for one can of Kiwi boot polish.

Soldiers returning from the war continued to use the product, leading to a further surge in its popularity. While Kiwi shoe polish was what business historian Alfred D. Chandler, Jr. would call a "first mover", Kiwi did not open a manufacturing plant in the US until after World War II. Prior to this, Cavalier Shoe Polish, founded by James Lobell, had operated in the US since 1913. The sales paradigm of Cavalier polish was to have footwear professionals sell Cavalier's high-end shoe polish to the shoe-buying public. A few years after World War II, Kiwi opened a manufacturing plant in Philadelphia, making only black, brown, and neutral shoe polish in tins. Kiwi purchased Cavalier in 1961, and continued to manufacture products under the name until the year 2000.

Kiwi was acquired by the American company Sara Lee following its purchase of Reckitt and Colman in 1991 and Knomark with its brand Esquire Shoe Polish in 1987. The Federal Trade Commission ruled that Sara Lee had to divest its ownership of these companies in 1994 to prevent it from becoming a monopoly. Since this ruling, Sara Lee has been prevented from acquiring any further assets or firms associated with chemical shoe care products in the United States without prior approval. The Competition Commission in the United Kingdom investigated the potential monopoly of Sara Lee in the shoe care industry.

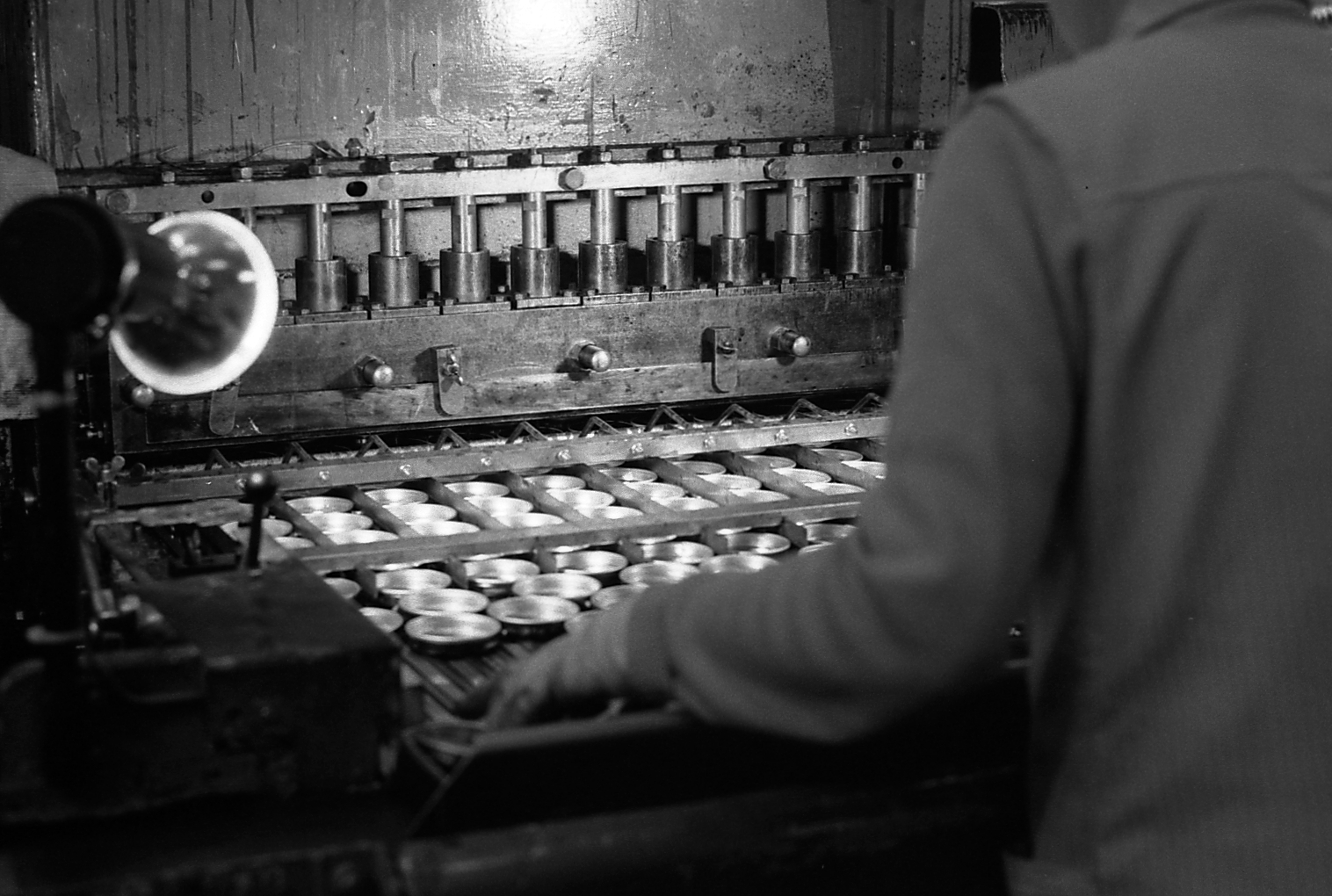
KIWI Shoe Polish canning machine in 1972 – empty tins being loaded

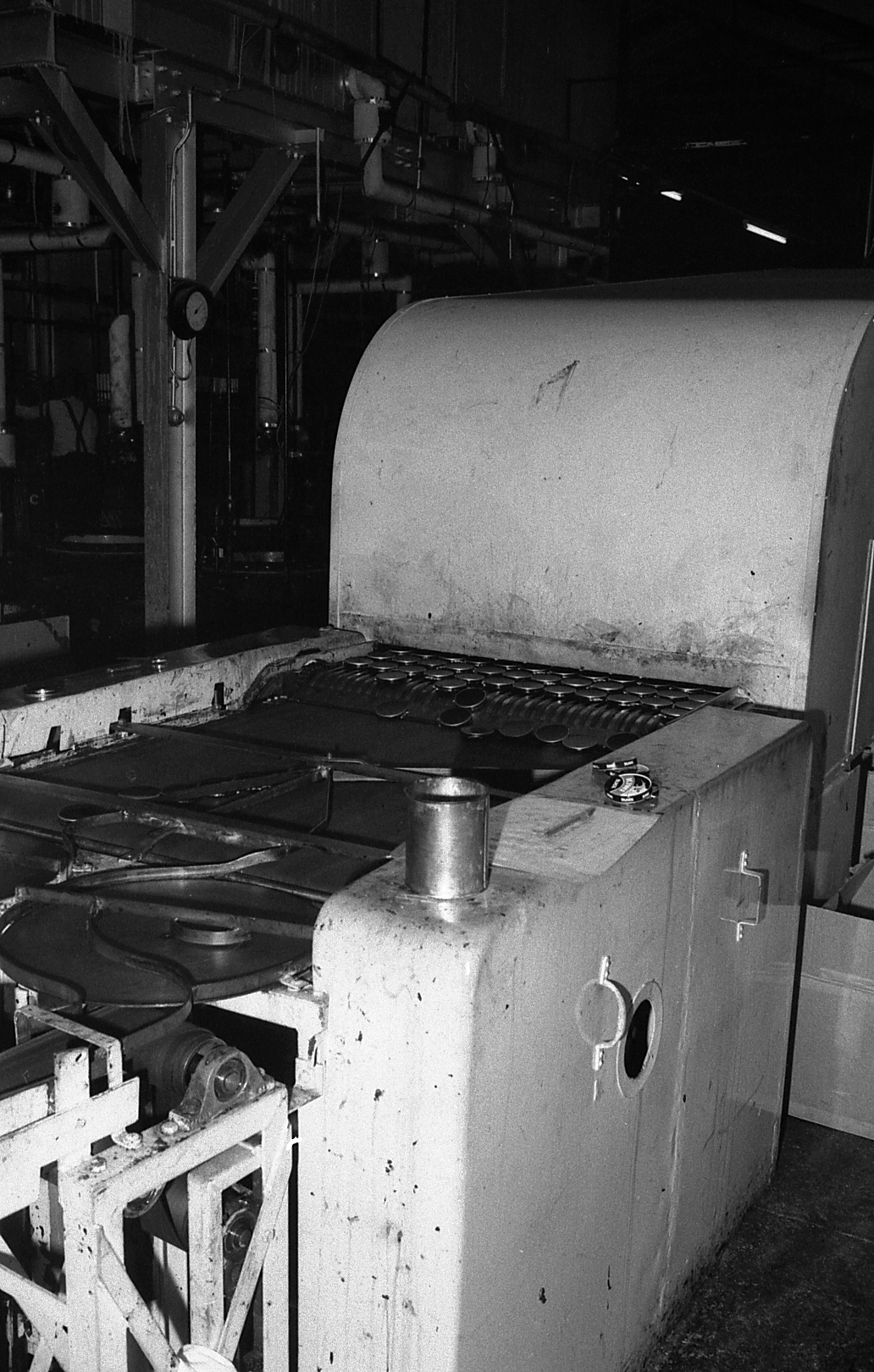
Full tins from machine

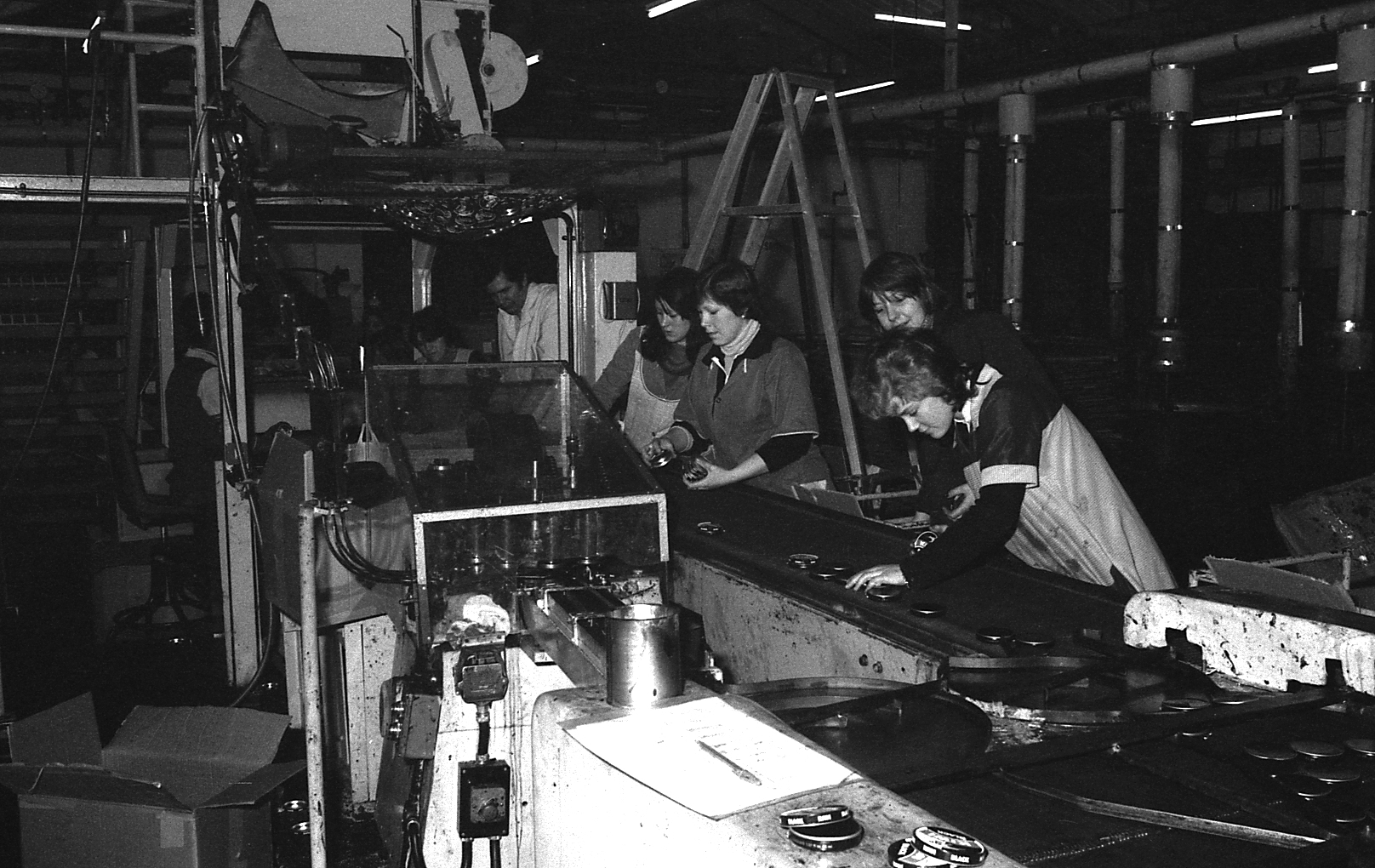
Staff fitting lids by hand

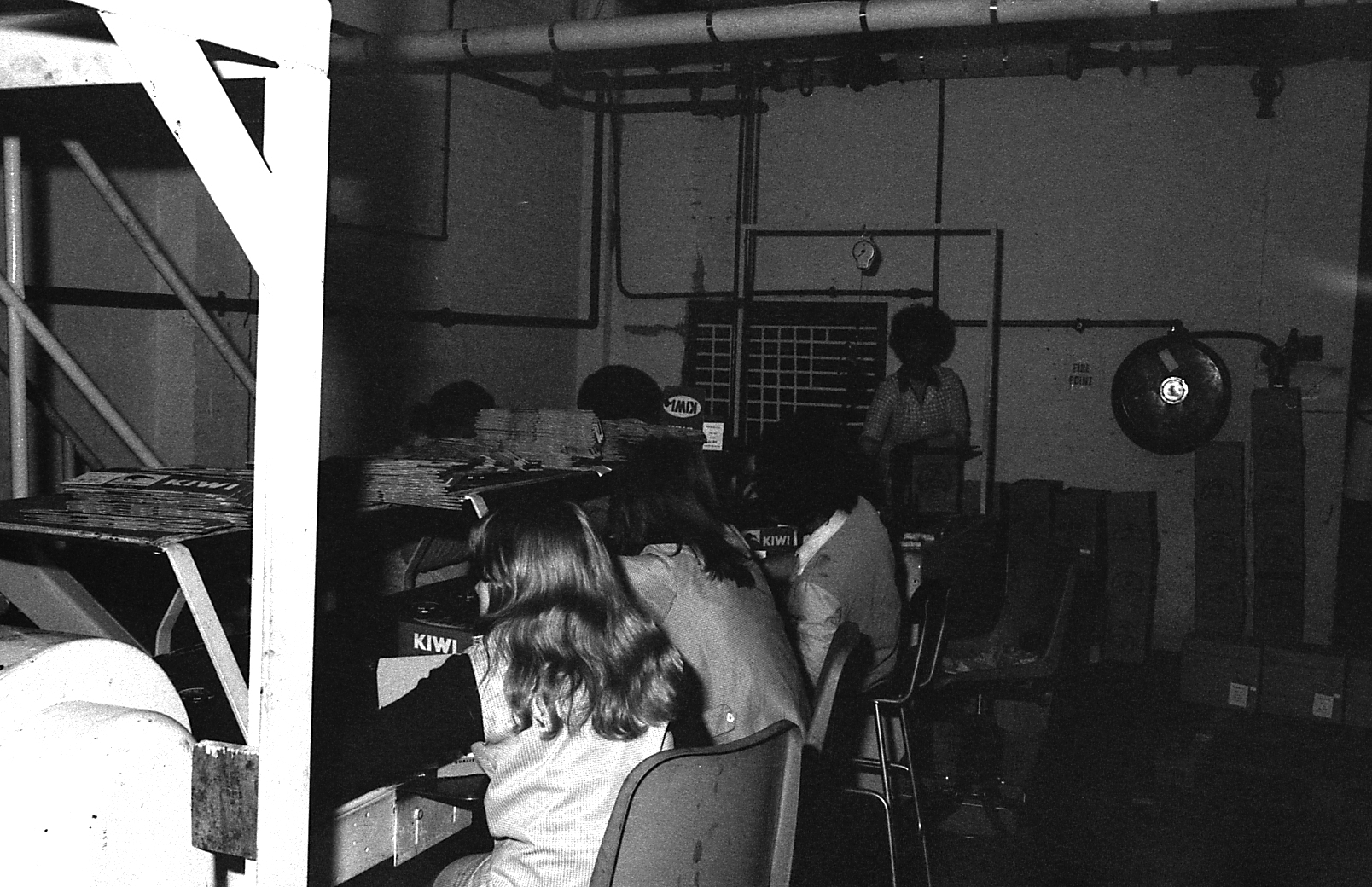
Staff packing cans into boxes

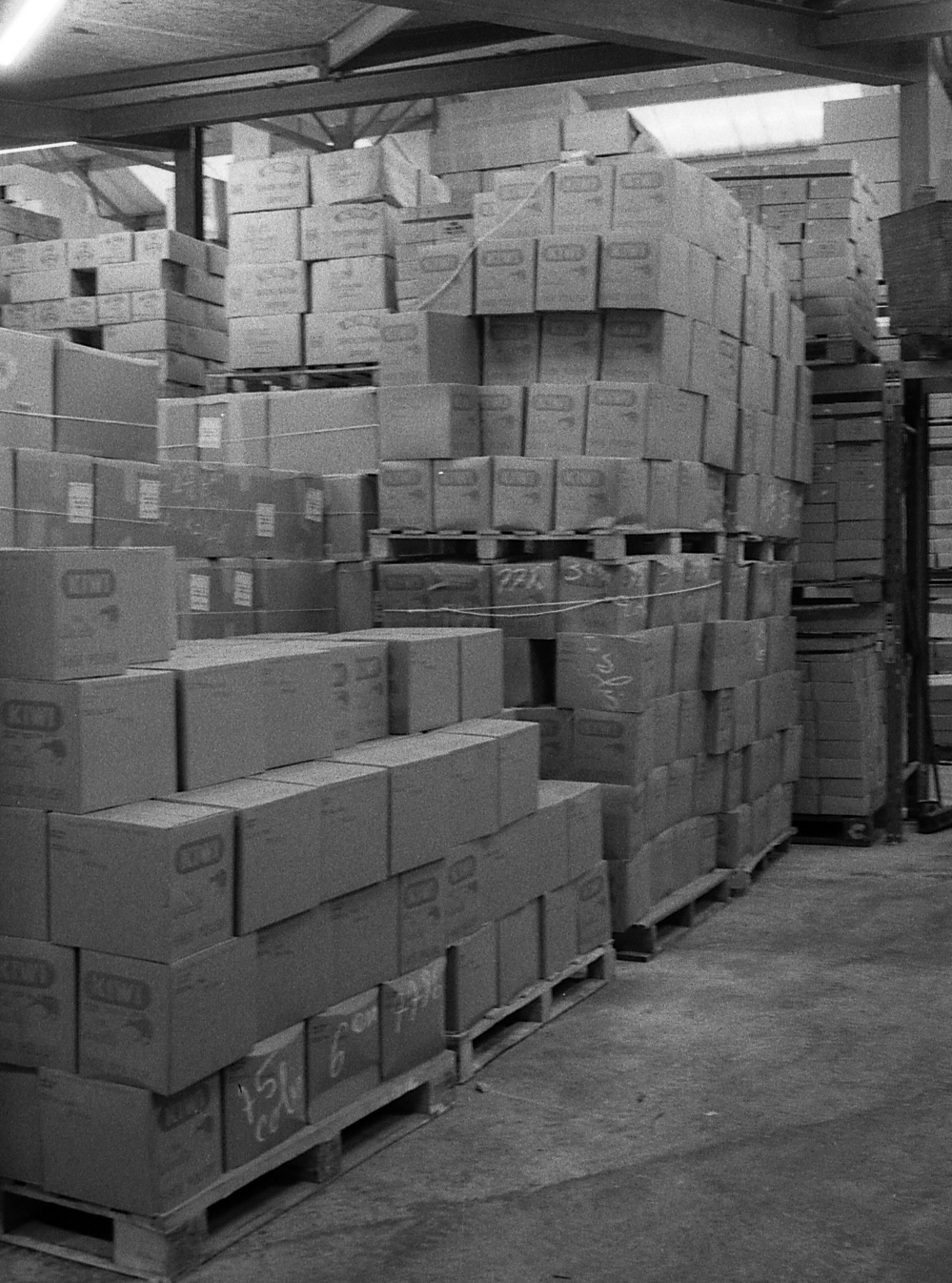
1972, KIWI Shoe Polish Warehouse Storage, at K&M Candle & shoe Polish Factory, Brockholes, West Yorkshire

=== Modern day ===
Shoe polish products are low-value items that are infrequently purchased, as a single can might last several months for even the most frequent user. Consumer demand is inelastic and largely insensitive to price change, while sales volumes are generally low. In the shoe polish market as a whole, some 26% of turnover is accounted for by pastes, 24% by creams, 23% by aerosols, and 13% by liquids. The demand for shoe polish products has either been static or declined from its mid-century heights, one reason is the gradual replacement of formal footwear with a variety of other options.

There are numerous branded products available, as well as generic store brands. There are two chief areas of shoe polish sales: to the public, and to specialists and trade, such as shoe repairers, and cobblers. The sales percentages between the two outlets are roughly comparable. The best-selling, low-cost brands are produced by these companies: Kiwi, Griffin, Tana, and Johnson, and Reckitt & Colman. Approximately 60 million units are sold annually. Other leading brands include Kelly's, Shinola, Lincoln Shoe Polish, Meltonian, Angelus, Woly, Salamander, Collonil and Cherry Blossom.

The global shoe polish market remains in transition as market forecasters analyze future trends. There is little belief that the shoe shine markets will ever meet reach previous demand, but the overall market is expected to grow from its current levels due to rising disposable income levels, urbanization, corporate culture, fashion trends, and e-commerce growth. Specific trends, such as increased focused on personal grooming, a growing footwear industry, product innovations, and brand loyalty are acting as acting as market drivers, reinforcing growth projections provided that market restraints like: substitute products, economic downturns, environmental concerns, and health concerns, do not impact those trends.

== Usage ==
Shoe polish is applied to the shoe using a rag, cloth, brush, or with bare fingers. Shoe polish is not a cleaning product, its application is for clean and dry shoes. Vigorous rubbing action is often required to apply the polish evenly to the boot, followed by further buffing with a clean dry cloth or brush. Another technique, known as "spit-polishing" or "bull polishing", involves gently rubbing polish into the leather with a cloth and a drop of water or spit. This action achieves the mirror-like, high-gloss finish sometimes known as a "spit" or "bull" shine, which is especially valued in military organizations. Despite the term, saliva is less commonly used as the vehicle or diluent with polish than is water. Polishes containing carnauba wax can be used as a protective coating to extend the life and look of a leather shoe.

Many companies offer products with liquid shoe polish that is pre-soaked into a hard sponge or have a sponge attached to an applicator. These products can be used to buff leather without needing to apply any additional polish to either the leather or the sponge. These products are often marketed as "quick shine," "express shine," "instant shine," or similar branding to emphasize the ease and speed of use.

== Related products ==
Many products are closely related to shoe polish, but not strictly considered as such. Other chemical products may be used to clean and shine shoes—in particular whiteners for white shoes, and a variety of sprays and aerosols for cleaning and waterproofing suede shoes. A banana peel can also be used to effectively shine shoes, but it is not recommended.

Although shoe polish is primarily intended for leather shoes, some brands specify that it may be used on non-porous materials, such as vinyl. The polish is generally the same colour as the shoes it will be used upon, or it may be neutral, lacking any colouring agents.

== Safety and environmental considerations ==
Exposure to shoe polish fumes can irritate the skin, eyes, and throat. Ingestion or direct exposure to eyes may require poison control. Prolonged exposure, such as during shoe polish or shoe production, has an associated enhanced risk for cancer, primarily nose and nasal sinuses. However, the general health risks associated with the normal use and production of shoe polish are relatively low.

The production of shoe polish can have environmental impacts at all stages of production, with the severity dependent on the type of polish being produced and the production's waste disposal or treatment process. Most polishes are primarily solvents and dyes, both are widely regarded to have serious environmental impacts. Additionally, as with most chemicals, shoe polish can contaminate environments if it is not properly handled or disposed of. However, shoe polish manufactures point out that reducing overall consumption has a more beneficial long-term impact to the environment than routinely replacing worn-out items. Arguing that shoe polish helps preserve and extend the useful life expectancy of products, requiring that they be replaced less often.

== See also ==
- Leather: preservation and conditioning
