= Samuel Osborn (surgeon) =

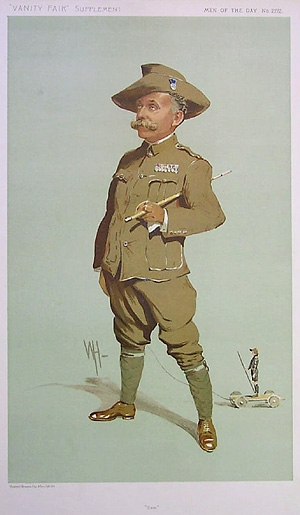
Samuel Osborn

Samuel Osborn FRCS FRHS FZS (15 April 1848, London – 16 April 1936, Datchet, Buckinghamshire) was a British general surgeon, chief surgeon to the metropolitan corps of the St John Ambulance Brigade, obstetrician, gynaecologist, and author.

The only son of Samuel Osborn (1814–1869), FRCS, the junior Samuel Osborn was educated at Epsom College and at Wren's (a "crammer" for the British army examinations) and then entered St Thomas' Hospital, where he was a house surgeon and for five years an anesthetist. He qualified LSA in 1870 and MRCS in 1871 and was elected FRCS in 1876. He was a surgeon in Royal Navy Artillery Volunteers for 12 years. From 1880 to 1922 he was surgeon to the Surgical Appliance Association and to the Metropolitan Convalescent Institution. He assisted John Furley in forming the St John Ambulance Association. Osborn served in 1897 with a Greek ambulance service during the Greco-Turkish war, in 1899 with Methuen's infantry division during the South African war, and in 1912 with the Turkish army as surgeon to the Red Crescent during the Balkan War.

In August 1914 he went to Belgium with three dressers and three surgical nurses, one of whom was his daughter, and took over a Belgian hospital located in a private house at Gembloux. When they arrived it was found that the village was in possession of German troops, who had advanced so rapidly that they had neither doctors nor nurses. They treated German and Belgian wounded for some weeks, until a German hospital arrived when they moved to the English convent at Bruges. Osborn was afterwards placed in charge of Lady Dundonald's Hospital at Eaton Square, London. For his work in Belgium he was decorated with the Croix de Chevalier de l'Ordre de la Couronne.

Between 1914 & 1918, he became the M.O. (medical officer) for the Countess of Dundonald hospital in London.

Osborn received many medals and honours. He was Justice of the Peace for Buckinghamshire. From 1919 to 1920 he was Master of the Society of Apothecaries. He married in 1884; the marriage produced a daughter, an only child.

== Selected publications ==
- On the treatment of hydrocele, The Retrospect of Practical Medicine and Surgery, 1877, 75, 172–174
- On the corpus Morgagni, with reference to diseases of the testicle. St Thos Hosp Rep 1874, 5, 73–84.
- On the different forms of hydrocele of the tunica vaginalis. St This Hosp Rep 1876, 7, 101–118.
- Notes on diseases of the testis. London, 1880.
- Annotations on anaesthetics. St Thos Hosp Rep 1880, 10, 49, and 1882, 11, 23.
- Ambulance lectures: first aid to the injured. London, 1885.
- Ambulance lectures on home nursing and hygiene. London 1885; 2nd edition, 1891
  - Premiers secours à donner aux malades et aux blesses. Paris, 1894.
