= William L. T. Foy =

City of London timber trader (1835–1911)

William Lowndes Toller Foy
- W. L. T. Foy
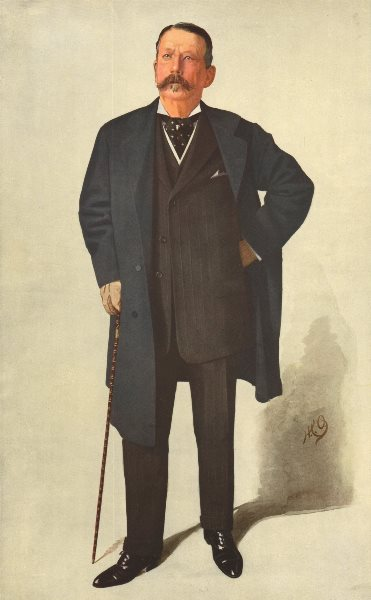
- 1911 caricature
- Born: 1834; England
- Died: October 19, 1911 (aged 76–77)
- Education: Chatham House School
- Occupation: Timber merchant
- Known for: Senior partner in the wood brokers Foy, Morgan & Co
- Spouse: Emily Gold (died 1903)
- Children: 6

William Lowndes Toller Foy, known as W. L. T. Foy (1835–1911) was an English timber merchant who was senior partner in the wood brokers Foy, Morgan & Co. David Kynaston wrote that he "had the bonhomie and the pleasant manner" to be popular in the trade as an auctioneer-broker.

== Early life ==
He was the son, according to a monumental inscription, of William Foy (1788–1875), and his wife who lived 1800 to 1875. He was educated at the Chatham House School in Ramsgate. He then entered the wool firm, Henry Clarke & Co.

Louis Bamberger knew Foy when he was setting up in business on his own, initially in London's Bishopsgate. He had office premises there, above the hairdressers Mazet's, and a Scottish colleague Robert Jobson. They traded as Jobson & Foy, joined by Jobson's cousin Alexander Farquharson. Foy was admitted as a City of London broker in 1864. The partnership was dissolved in 1867.

== Foy, Morgan & Co. ==
Foy then went into partnership with C. J. Morgan, initially also with Thomas Morgan, trading as Foy, Morgan & Co. Thomas Morgan came from the wood brokers Churchill & Sim, founded 1813. He left after a time. Charles James Morgan was brother of David John Morgan, and son of David Thomas Morgan. He left Radley School in 1872. According to Bamberger, Foy, Morgan & Co. was set up about 1875.

Foy, Morgan & Co. was an independent company until a takeover bid in 1967 by Price & Pierce. Price Hallam & Foys Ltd of 27 Clements Lane, London was a new company operating from January 1968, set up by the integration of Foy, Morgan in Price & Pierce; the Foy, Morgan name continuing to trade as a subsidiary at that address.

== Death ==
Foy died suddenly of heart failure, on 19 October 1911.

== Family ==
Foy's wife Emily Gold died in 1903. Of their children:

- Reginald Hearne Foy, died 1897 at Bulowayo.
- Hubert Clifford Foy went into business in Canada with Horace Richardson Goodday, specialising in spruce deal. He married in Quebec in 1901 Helen Beatrice Hope Sewell, daughter of Charles Colin Sewell MD.
- Cecil Andreas Foy, married in 1905 Grace Lilian Edith Morgan, daughter of C. J. Morgan of Hulse Wood, Dartford Heath.
- Kenneth Constantine Stephenson Foy, educated at Eton College 1894–9, then joined the Rifle Brigade Militia. In South Africa, of Vereeniging, he married in 1905 Rose Frances (Dollie) Newland, daughter of Henry Pigott Newland. He later had a farm at Standerton.
- Annie Florence (died 1922), married in 1905 as his second wife Col. George Frederick Ashford Whitlock (1868–1936).
- Helen (died 1903) married as his second wife Rhys Goring-Thomas, son of Rees Goring Thomas III.
