= Wren's Super Wax Shoe Polish =

WREN'S Since 1889
- Type: Private
- Industry: Retail
- Founded: 1889
- Founder: William Edward Wren
- Headquarters: London, England
- Area served: Worldwide
- Products: Shoe and leather care
- Owner: ALMA F.R.C
- Website: www.wrens1889.com

WREN'S is the brand name of a British shoe polish, first launched, produced and sold in England in 1889. It is the only remaining recognized shoe polish brands to exist through three centuries. The founder of the brand was William Edward Wren.

== Early history (late 19th century) ==
The company's name was initially William Wren & Co but was given as Wm. Wren & Co Ltd by 1918. In a list compiled under the name "NORTHAMPTON BOOT & SHOE TRADE 1928" by Elaine Allen, the company's name was listed as Wren, William & Co. Ltd. in three different addresses in Northamptonshire.

Northamptonshire, then and now, is home to many shoe and boot makers, such as Edward Green, Loake, Church's and Tricker's. WREN'S became known for its quality and prestige and was awarded the First Award from the Leather Trades Exhibition in 1892.

William Wren & Co Ltd soon branched into other products like Floor & Furniture Polish, Metal Polish, Saddle & Harness Paste, and Puwite Shoe Whitener as well as Lavendo Furniture Polish in the early years.

== Golden years (1908–1964) ==
From the beginning of the 20th century, WREN'S became almost synonymous with the Royal Family in England. During the reign of King Edward VII, a WREN'S advertisement for its Boot & Shoe Polish in 1908 appeared with the declaration “As used by all branches of His Majesty’s Service”, particularly His Majesty's Own Royal Lancaster Regiment, the First and Fifth Battalion. The words "Made In England Since 1889" also became synonymous with the brand. In the same year, WREN'S won the Grand Prix (Grand Prize) at the International Exhibition held in Brussels as well.

WREN'S reputation reached its peak when King George VI emulated his grandfather by awarding the Royal Warrant to WREN'S despite the acquisition by Chiswick Polish Co., Ltd in 1938. All shoe and boot polish would have "By appointment to H. M. King George VI" on the lids. The product became known as WREN'S Super Wax Shoe Polish.

WREN'S Shoe Polish was very likely used by the British Army during World War II but this was never confirmed. King George VI died in 1952 due to ill health and was succeeded by Queen Elizabeth II. There was a version of the shoe polish with the Royal Warrant "By appointment to the late H. M. King George VI", very likely as a gesture of mourning for a great King.

== Declining years (1965–2010s) ==
The Royal Warrant continued until around 1964, when WREN'S merged with Meltonian to form Meltonian Wren Limited. The company name appeared on the lid of the transparent shoe polish "By appointment to H. M. The Queen, Mfrs. of shoe polish Meltonian Wren Ltd". The discontinuation of the Royal Warrant was most likely due to the uncertainties caused by the successive acquisitions taking place in such a short period. After further acquisition by Reckitt & Colman Ltd, the brand went on a downward spiral until the 21st century.

== Revival ==
WREN'S has been active on social media since 2014 with Facebook and Instagram being favoured over other social media platforms.

In 2016, WREN'S was relaunched in a few countries namely Singapore, Taiwan, New Zealand, Poland, the United Kingdom, Australia, Hong Kong, South Korea, Japan, France, Spain, Italy, Germany, Canada and Indonesia. WREN'S has since enjoyed relative success and popularity on Amazon Europe consisting of Amazon UK, Amazon Italy, Amazon France, Amazon Spain and Amazon Germany.

n 2022, Hackson and Sons Ltd sold the brand to the ALMA F.R.C from France. It's Chief Executive Officer, Raymond Tan is still responsible for WREN'S and is spearheading ALMA F.R.C's foray into Asia Pacific. ALMA F.R.C also owns the brands Saphir, Tarrago, Dasco, Waproo among other brands.

WREN'S marked her 135th anniversary in 2024.
