= Ernest Collins =

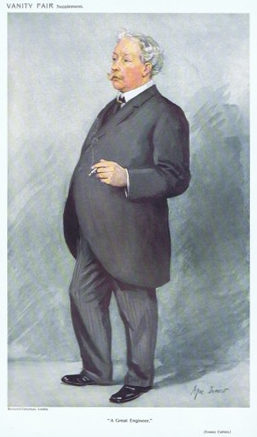
Collins caricatured by "Ape junior" in Vanity Fair, 1911

Ernest Collins (18 February 1851 – 20 April 1914) was a British water supply engineer.

He was born in Harefield, Middlesex, the fifth son of the Rev. Robert Cave Wood Collins, then Vicar of Harefield, and his wife, Rachel Vernor Miles. He was educated at Aldenham Grammar School and Neuchâtel.

After serving his articles to Ruston, Proctor and Company, of Lincoln, he took a post with Hopkins, Gilkes & Company.

In 1880, he joined the staff of the New River Company, which supplied clean water to London via an artificial waterway. He was their chief engineer when the company was transferred to the Metropolitan Water Board. In 1905, he was appointed Engineer of the New River District, a position he held until his retirement in 1911. He was elected a Member of the Institution of Civil Engineers in 1892.

In 1883, Collins introduced the almost universally adopted system of testing and stamping water fittings.

He was also Chairman of Council of Hampstead General Hospital.

He died in Christchurch, Hampshire in 1914, aged 63.
