= Fred Whisstock =

English artist, cartoonist and illustrator

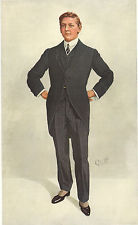
Caricature by Fred Whisstock "Quip" published in Vanity Fair

Frederick William Whisstock (known as Fred Whisstock or Quip 1878 – 1943) was an English artist, cartoonist, and well known illustrator for the W. Britain Toy Company.

Fred Whisstock was born in 1878 in Bow, East London. He moved to Southend in 1887, and was encouraged in his painting by George Reed, the headmaster of London Road Schools. He won several scholarships to attend the Royal College of Arts (South Kensington) and also won the Queens's prize for Model Drawing. After two years as a teacher, he joined Waterlow and Sons, the London printers and for the following three years he designed postage stamps for Ecuador, Nicaragua, Costa Rica and New Zealand.

Around 1903 he became a freelance artist and many of the watercolours in circulation, date from around this time (right). He worked with the poster artist Charles Dawson and later shared a studio in Jessle Chambers with the famous engraver J.A.C. Harrison. During this period he drew three caricatures (signed under the pseudonym Quip) that were published in Vanity fair. He continued to design book plates and, furthermore, designed a set of stamps for Liberia for Perkins Bacon. His cartoons (always signed Quip) were regularly published in newspapers and periodicals.

During the 1914–18 war, Whisstock served in the Home Guard as a lance-corporal.

In the early 20th century and up until 1930, Whisstock was employed by Britain's to design the box labels in a single style for their lead toy soldiers series. Fred Britain, the younger brother of William Britain, lived in Southend from 1899 to 1928, and it is suggested that the connection to the Britain's firm was established through him. An example of his work is shown above. In good condition Britain's Toy Soldiers in an original Whisstock box have become highly collectable items (usually the signature is in the bottom left corner).

Fred Whisstock was not married, and he died in Southend on 16 September 1943 aged 65.

== See also ==
- Vanity Fair caricatures
