= List of Vanity Fair artists =

The following is a list of artists who contributed to the British magazine Vanity Fair (1868–1914).

== Artists ==
Signature	Name	Note
AHM	Marks, Arthur H	
ALS		
Ao	L'Estrange, Roland	
Ape	Pellegrini, Carlo	
Ape Junior		
Astz		
Ἀτη	Thompson, Alfred	
BEDE		Bede
Bint	possibly Mary Catherine Rees née Dormer	wikt:bint
Bulbo	Beerbohm, Max	
CB	Bradley, Cuthbert	
Cecioni	Cecioni, Adriano	
CG	Gould, Francis Carruthers	
CGD	Duff, CG	
Chartham		
Cloister	Duff, CG	
Coïdé	Tissot, James	
Corbold	Corbold, AC	
D'Épinay	d'Épinay, Prosper	
Delfico	Delfico, Melchiorre	
Drawl	Ward, Leslie	
EBN	Norton, Eardley	
Eianley Cock	Cock, Eianley	
ELF	Fildes, Luke	
Emil Adam	Adam, Emil	
FCG	Gould, Francis Carruthers	
FG	Goedecker, Franz	
Flagg	Flagg, James Montgomery	
FR		
Frank Paton	Paton, Frank	
FTD	Dalton, FT	
Furniss	Furniss, Harry	
FV	Villiers, Frederic	
GAF	Fothergill, G.A.	
GAW		
GDG	Giles, Godfrey Douglas	
GEO HUM		
Glick		
GO	Goedecker, Franz	
Grimm	Grimm, Constantine von	
Guth	Guth, Jean Baptiste	
Hadge		
Hal Hurst	Hurst, Hal	
Hay	W.B. Hayes	
HCO		
Hester	Hester, Wallace	
Hit		
How		
JB Guth	Guth, Jean Baptiste	
JBP	Partridge, Bernard	
JEST		
Jopling	Jopling, Joseph Middleton	
jmp	Price, Julius Mendes	
JTJ	Tissot, James	
K		
KITE		
Kluz		
KYO	Braddell, Robert Wallace Glen Lee	
Lib	Prosperi, Libero	
Leslie Ward	Ward, Leslie	
Lyall		
Max	Beerbohm, Max	
MD	Loye, Charles Auguste	
Montbard	Loye, Charles Auguste	
Mouse		
MR		
N		
Nast	Nast, Thomas	
Nemo	Grimm, Constantine von	Latin for "no one".
Nibs		
OWL		
PAL	Paleologue, Jean de	
PAT		
Percy Earl	Earl, Percy	
Pip		
PRY		
Pyg		
Quip	Whisstock, Fred	
Quiz	Mellor, John Paget	
Ray		
Ritchie	Ritchie, Alick Penrose	
RUTH	Beerbohm, Max	
Sic	Sickert, Walter	
Singe	Pellegrini, Carlo	French for "ape". See Ape.
SNAPP		
Spy	Ward, Leslie	
sTel		
Strickland		
STUFF	Wright, Henry Charles Seppings	
Sue		
T	Chartran, Théobald	
TC	Chartran, Théobald	
Tec		
VA		
Vanitas		Latin for "vanity".
VER	Verheyden, François	
wag	Witherby, AG	
Wallace Hester	Hester, Wallace	
WE Miller	Miller, William Edwards	
WGR		
WH	Hester, Wallace	
Whistler	Whistler, James McNeill	
WHO		
WV	Vine, W	
XIT		

== See also ==
- Maîtres de l'Affiche
- Vanity Fair (British magazine 1868–1914)
- Vanity Fair caricatures
