= Franz Goedecker =

German wine merchant and artist

Franz Caspar Hugo Goedecker (c. 1840 – 15 December 1884) was a German wine merchant and artist who settled in England.

Outside his business career, Goedecker was also an officer of the German Athenaeum Club and a caricaturist for the London magazine Vanity Fair.

== Life ==
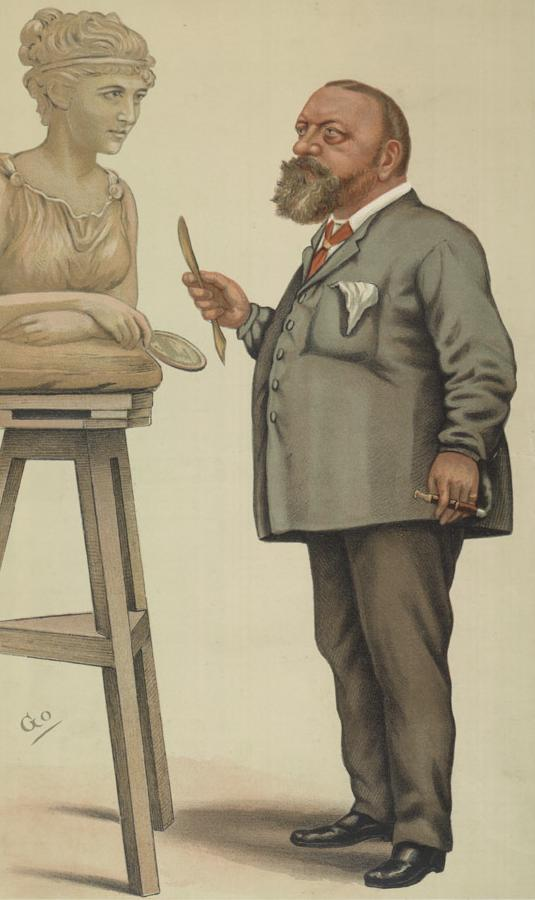
Count Gleichen, by Goedecker, from Vanity Fair

A native of Bingen in the Rhineland, Goedecker was born about 1840, and studied at the Ludwig-Maximilians-Universität München. By the 1860s, he was living in England and working as a wine merchant. With other Germans living in England, including the painter Richard Huttula, Carl Haag, Wilhelm Kumpel, and Joseph Wolf, an animal-painter, Goedecker joined the London-based Verein für Kunst und Wissenschaft (Society for Art and Science). In the late 1860s, he was part of a group called Gemütliches Deutschland ("Easygoing Germany)" which met at the Hotel de la Boule d'Or, in Soho, whose members later joined the German Athenaeum of London. In 1874, Goedecker was the secretary of the art department of the German Athenaeum and was thanked by the chairman, Carl Haag, for organizing a musical Composition Evening. By 1879, he was a committee member of the German Athenaeum. In 1881, he was living in lodgings in Lewisham High Street and was described for that year's census as a married 41-year-old merchant born in Germany. He also had business offices in St James's Street, with Francis Moll, and Goedecker & Moll traded as wine and spirits merchants. He sometimes anglicized his name as "Francis Goedecker". On 15 November 1883, Goedecker and Moll dissolved their partnership.

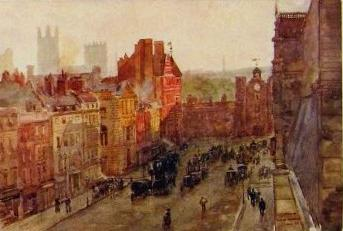
St James's Street, c. 1890

In 1883, The Theatre described Goedecker as "The leading spirit of the parody, and one of the most popular members of the club... one of the very ablest of living caricaturists..." and noted that on a recent occasion he had modelled a head of Bismarck and another of Sir Julius Benedict in only five minutes. In July of that year, he took part in a Royal Fete at South Kensington, modelling busts in the West Pavilion before a performance of the farce "Six and Eightpence" by Herbert and Mrs Beerbohm Tree.

Goedecker died in the Rhineland in December 1884, in a railway carriage on a train travelling between Ingelheim and Bingen. At the time of his death, his address in England was 1, Limes Terrace, Lewisham, Kent, and he left an estate valued at £3,411 (equivalent to £378,963 in 2025), having appointed two other German business men living in England as his executors.

In his book Englische Sprach-Schnitzer (1886), "O'Clarus Hiebslac Esq. M. A., Fellow of the German Athenaeum", noted that the English had had trouble pronouncing the name of Goedecker, saying instead "Goodacre", "Godsacre", or even "George Decker". He added in a footnote that his talented friend was now at rest in the Godsacre of his ancestral Bingen and would live on in the memory of his many friends.

In 1907, the firm of Goedecker & Moll was still trading and held a royal warrant as wine-merchants to King Edward VII. In 1919, it was still in existence, with a royal warrant to supply wine to King George V.

== Work ==
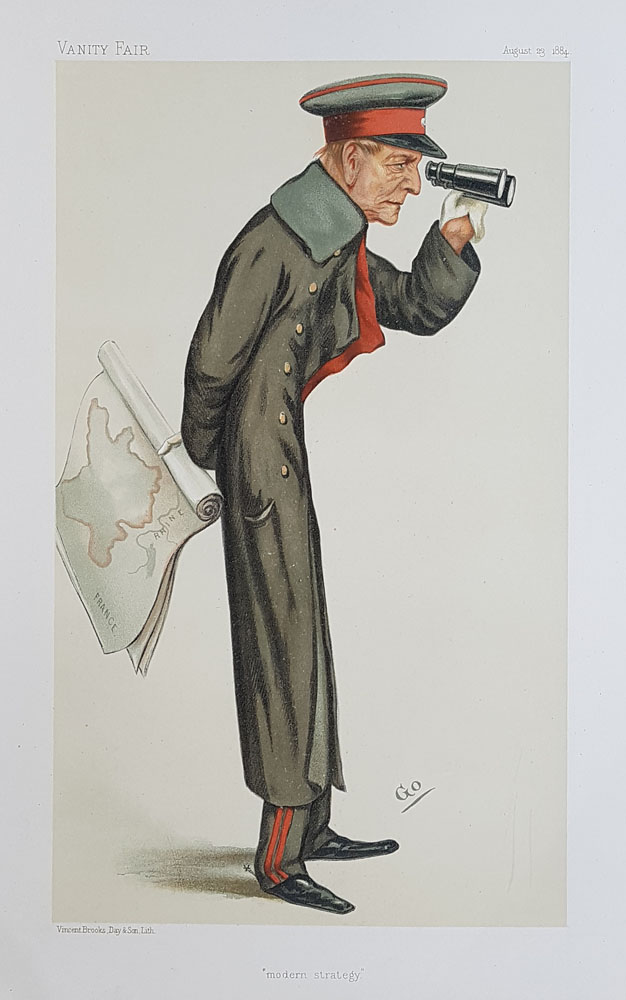
Moltke, by Goedecker, 1884

An outline of Goedecker by the British Museum calls him a "Watercolourist, draughtsman and caricaturist".

His illustrations for Vanity Fair included caricatures of Hubert Herkomer, Carl Haag, Count von Moltke, Prince Victor of Hohenlohe-Langenburg, and perhaps Tom Nickalls.

Goedecker’s Moltke, published on 23 August 1884, has the title "Modern Strategy". Roy T. Matthews calls it "one of the notable examples of the consistency of Vanity Fair's style of caricature" and says of it "The aging general’s features and figure are sharply exaggerated, so that in a glance the viewer can comprehend the essence of the individual, yet recognize the man."

In March 1883, Goedecker sent John Ruskin photographs of some of his work, and received a reply:

I see no matter of merriment either in the weakness of age or the abortions of vulgar form; and I sincerely hope that you will not waste your real powers in pandering to the malice or the stupidity of those people who do. If you add to your present gift of seizing grotesque or abnormal character the skill proper to a painter, you might take a position of most useful influence in representing the evils and dangers of our great cities and manufactories: and you might win for yourself such an honourable fame as that of Hogarth, instead of the momentary praise of amusing the idleness of evening parties.

A later writer commented on this that Ruskin had himself been caricatured in Vanity Fair more than once.

A portrait by Goedecker of his fellow German artist Hubert Herkomer is in the National Portrait Gallery, London.

== See also ==
- List of Vanity Fair artists
