= Théobald Chartran =

French painter (1849–1907)

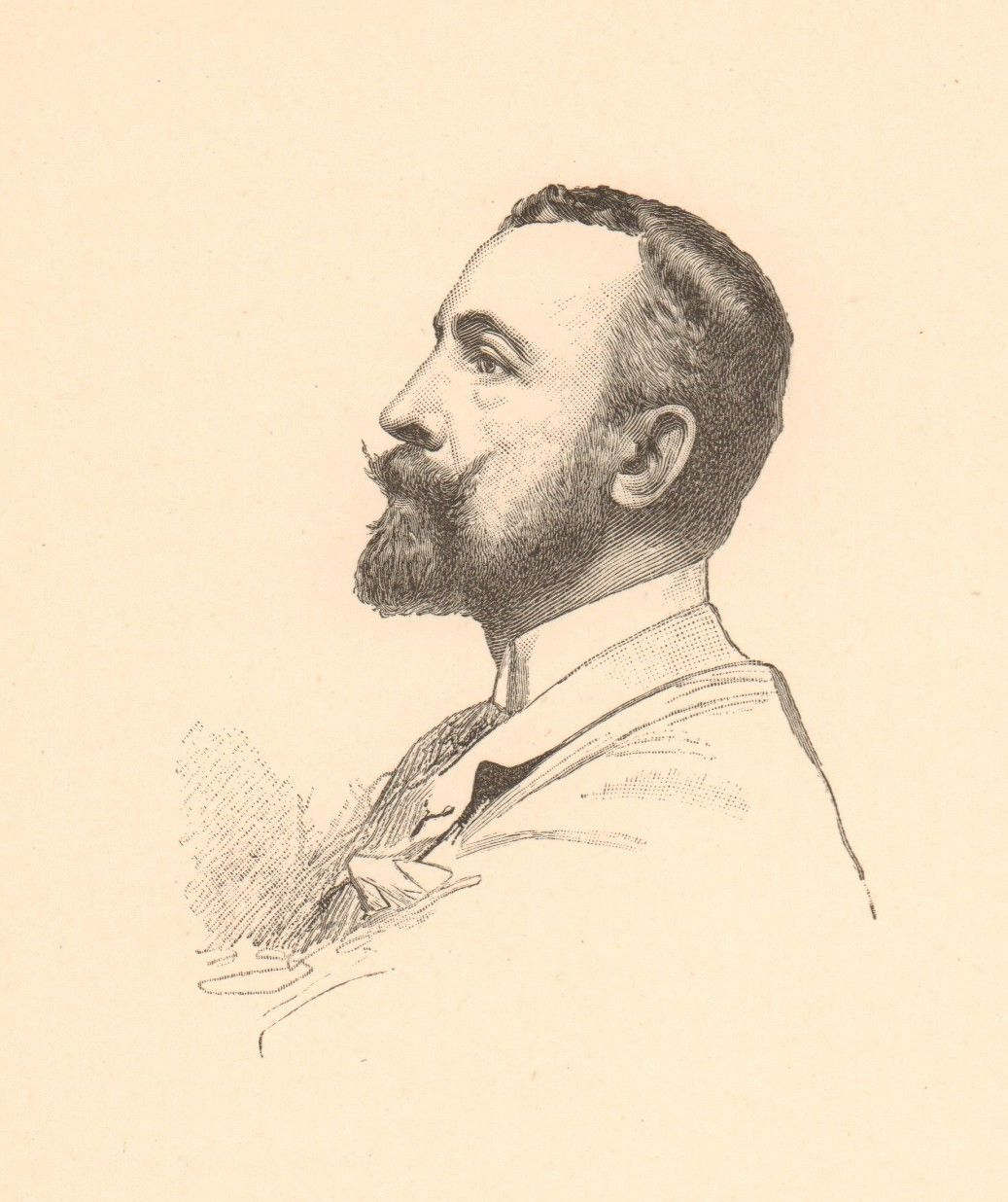
- Théobald Chartran
- Born: 20 July 1849; Besançon, France
- Died: 16 July 1907 (aged 57); Paris, France
- Education: Alexandre Cabanel; École des Beaux-Arts
- Known for: Painting
- Awards: Prix de Rome

Théobald Chartran (20 July 1849 – 16 July 1907) was a French academic painter and portrait artist.

== Early life ==
Chartran was born in Besançon, France on 20 July 1849. His father was Councilor at the Court of Appeals and he was the nephew of Gen. Chartran who was executed in the Restoration because of his imperialistic tendencies. Through his mother, he was descended from Count Théobald Dillon, who was murdered by his own troops in 1792.

While his parents encouraged him to study law or enter the military, young Chartran was inclined towards art. He studied at the Lycée Victor-Hugo in Besançon before heading to Paris in order to devote himself entirely to the study of art under Alexandre Cabanel, later attending the École des Beaux-Arts in Paris.

== Career ==
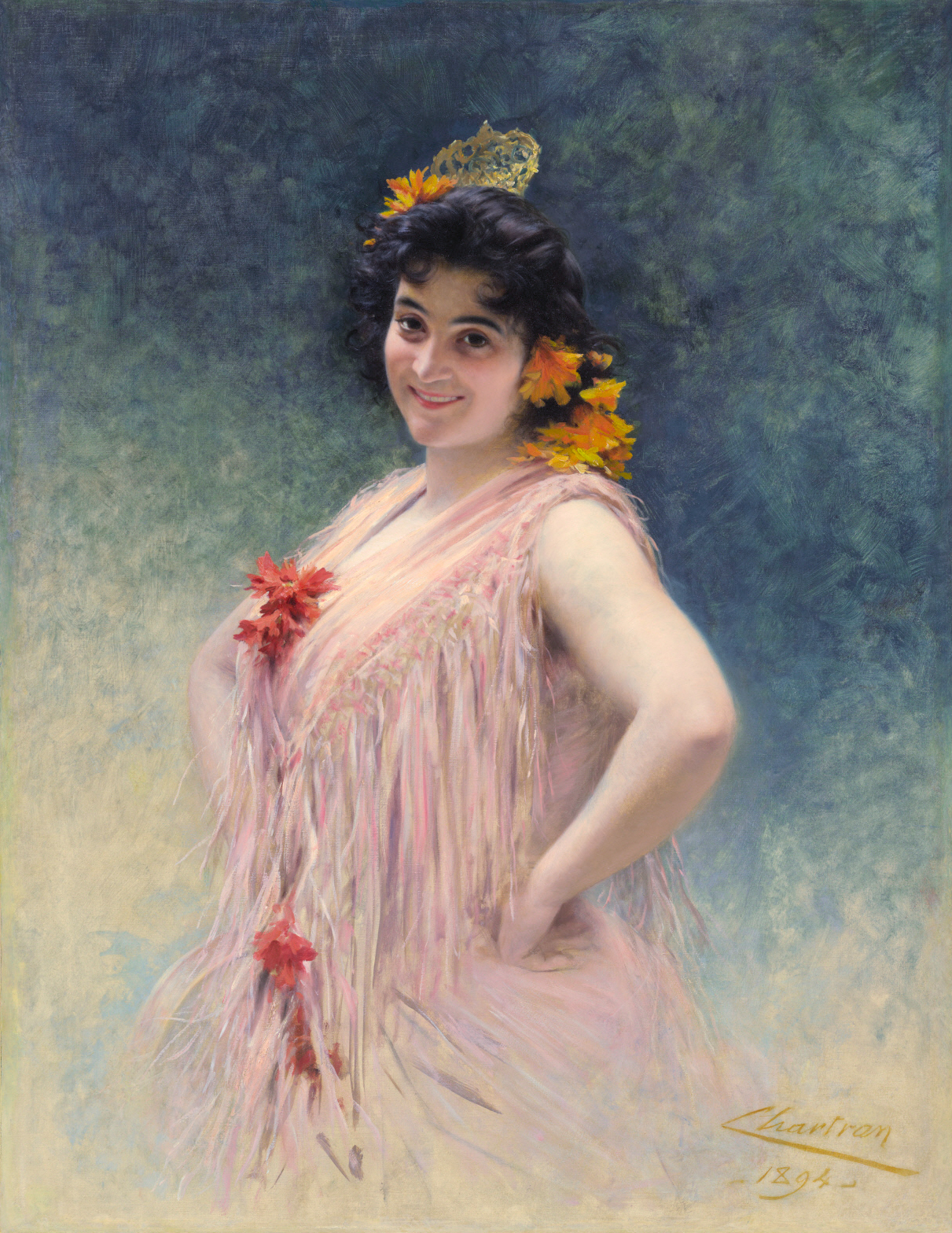
Théobald Chartran, Emma Calvé as Carmen, 1894, oil on canvas. Clark Art Institute

In 1871, the body of Georges Darboy, the Archbishop of Paris, "who had perished in the disorders of the commune", was exhumed in order to receive the last honors, and Chartran made a portrait of the Archbishop in his official robes and on his catafalque. This painting was widely admired by the public and for it, he won the Grand Prix de Rome in 1877.

As "T", he was one of the artists responsible for occasional caricatures of Vanity Fair magazine, specializing in French and Italian subjects. His work for Vanity Fair included Pope Leo XIII, Giuseppe Garibaldi, Umberto I of Italy, William Henry Waddington, all in 1878, Charles Gounod, Giuseppe Verdi, Ernest Renan, Jules Grévy, Napoléon Joseph Charles Paul Bonaparte, Victor Hugo, Marshal MacMahon, Granier de Cassagnac, Louis Blanc, and Alexandre Dumas fils, all in 1879.

Among Chartran's work is his portrait of René-Théophile-Hyacinthe Laennec, the inventor of the stethoscope, Gen. Gouverneur K. Warren, Benoît-Constant Coquelin, the Maharaja of Kapurthala and the Countess of Maupeou. His individual-subject portraiture is often characterized by a rich background gradient, embodied in Emma Calvé as Carmen (1894).

=== President Roosevelt ===
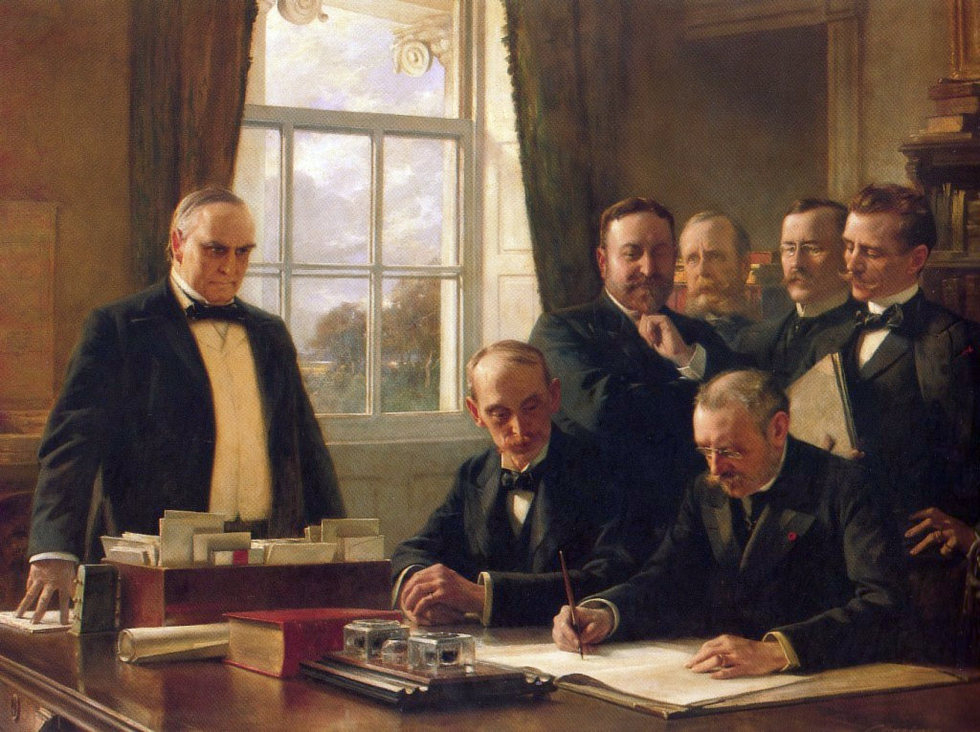
Signing of the Peace Protocol Between Spain and the United States, August 12, 1898, by Chartran (1899)

In 1899, Henry Clay Frick commissioned Chartran to create a painting of the scene when the peace protocol at the close of the Spanish–American War was signed in the Cabinet Room. In October 1903, Frick gifted the picture, which had cost $20,000, to the United States, which President Roosevelt accepted.

In 1902, Chartran was commissioned to paint President Theodore Roosevelt's official portrait after successfully completing portraits of Mrs. Roosevelt in 1902 and Alice Roosevelt in 1901. In discussing his experience with painting the president to Le Figaro, he said that it "was difficult to get the President to sit still. I never had a more restless or more charming sitter. He speaks French like a boulevardier, and wittily." Chartran "did not try to depict the official Roosevelt, but rather the private man." When Roosevelt saw the final product he hated it and hid it in the darkest corner of the White House. When family members called it the "Mewing Cat" for making him look so harmless, he had it destroyed and hired John Singer Sargent to paint a more masculine portrait.

== Gallery ==
René Laënnec – National Library of Medicine, Bethesda, Maryland, USA

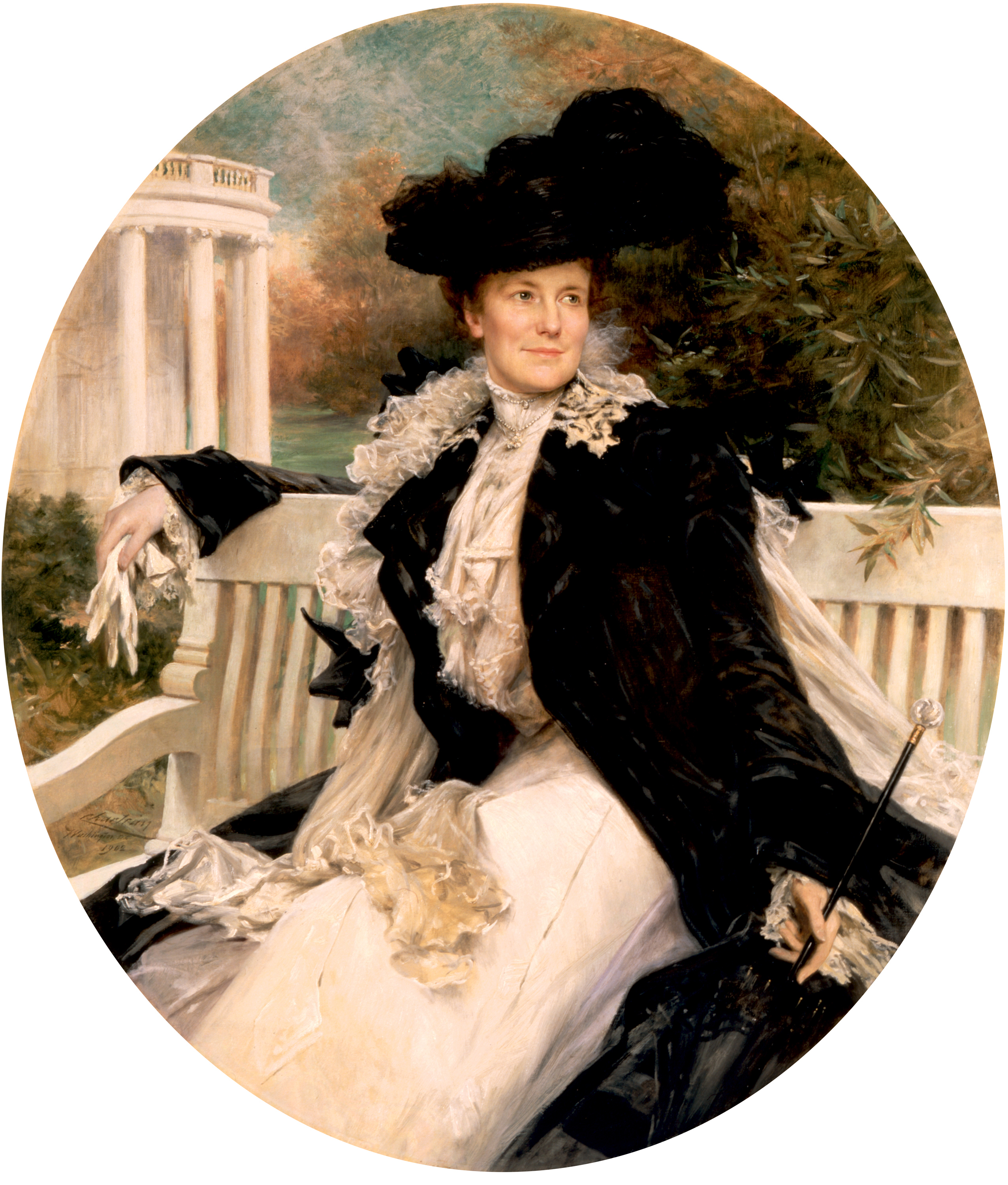
Edith Roosevelt's official portrait as First Lady (1902)

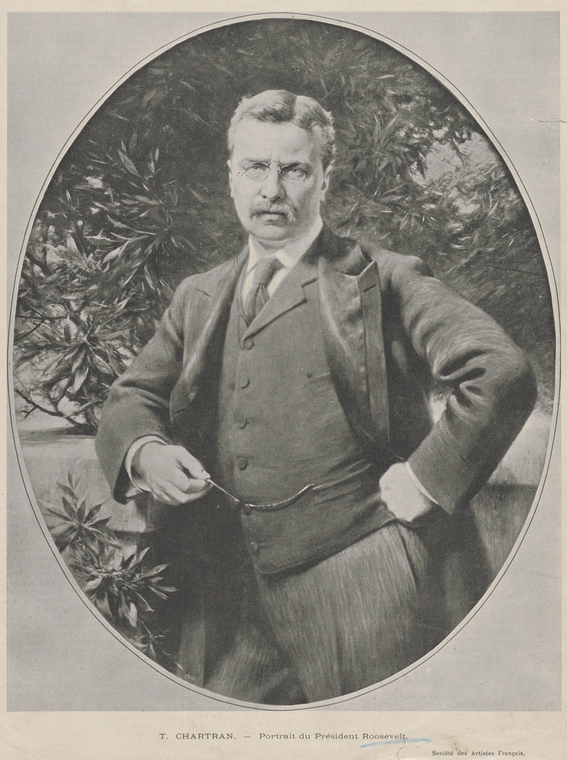
T. Chartran.--Portrait of Président Roosevelt. (1902)

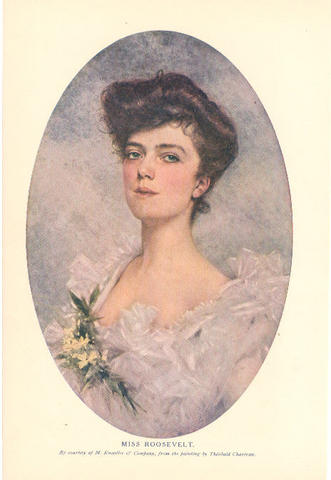
Alice Roosevelt's portrait

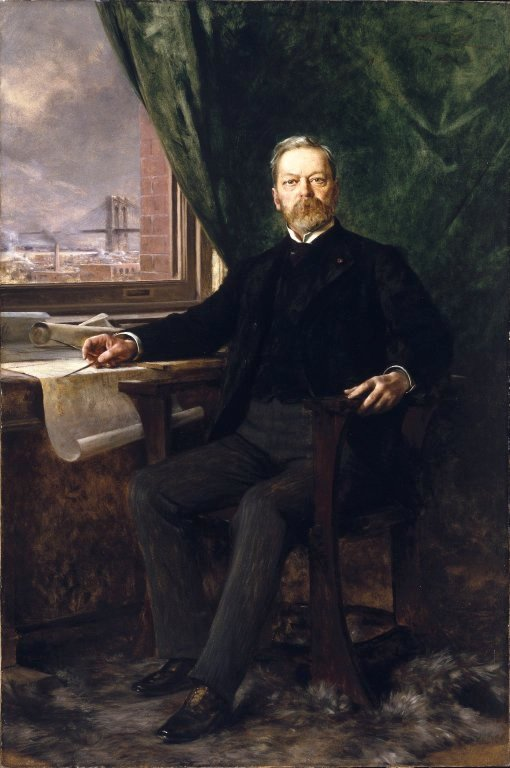
Théobald Chartran – Washington A. Roebling – Brooklyn Museum

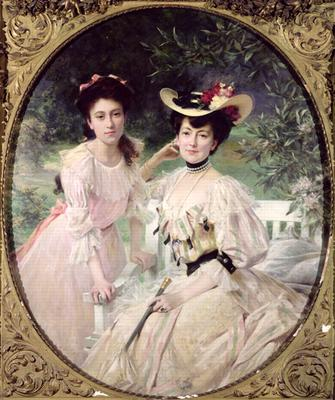
Madame Collas et sa fille, 1903, Paris, Musée d'Orsay.

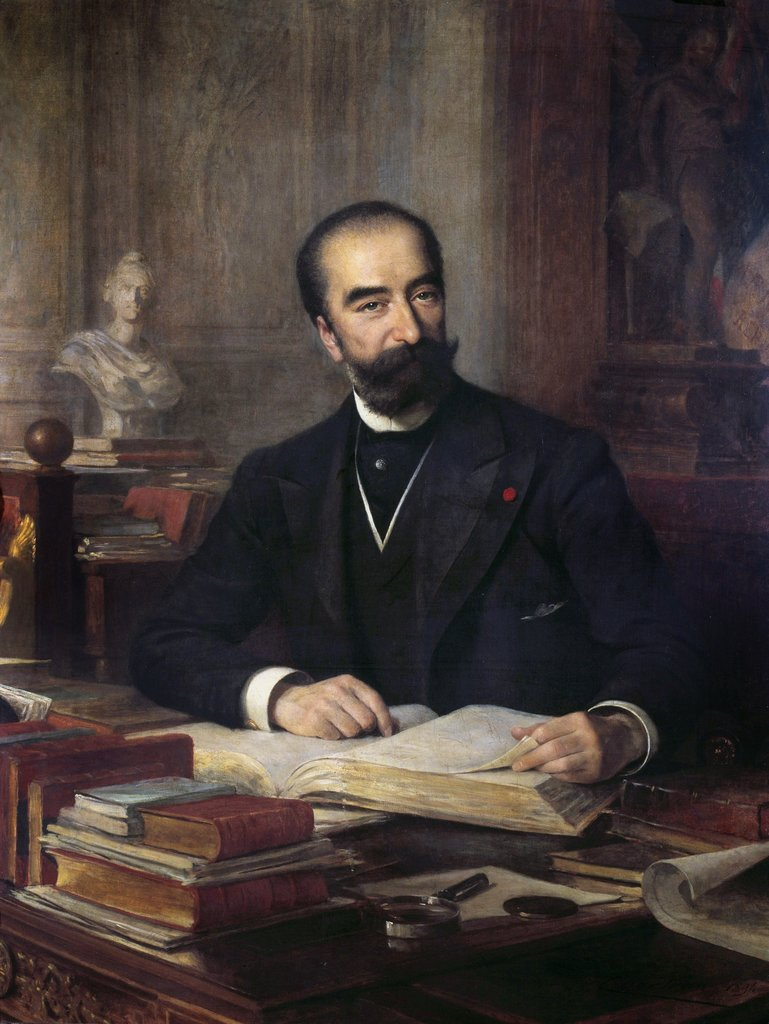
Portrait de Sadi Carnot.

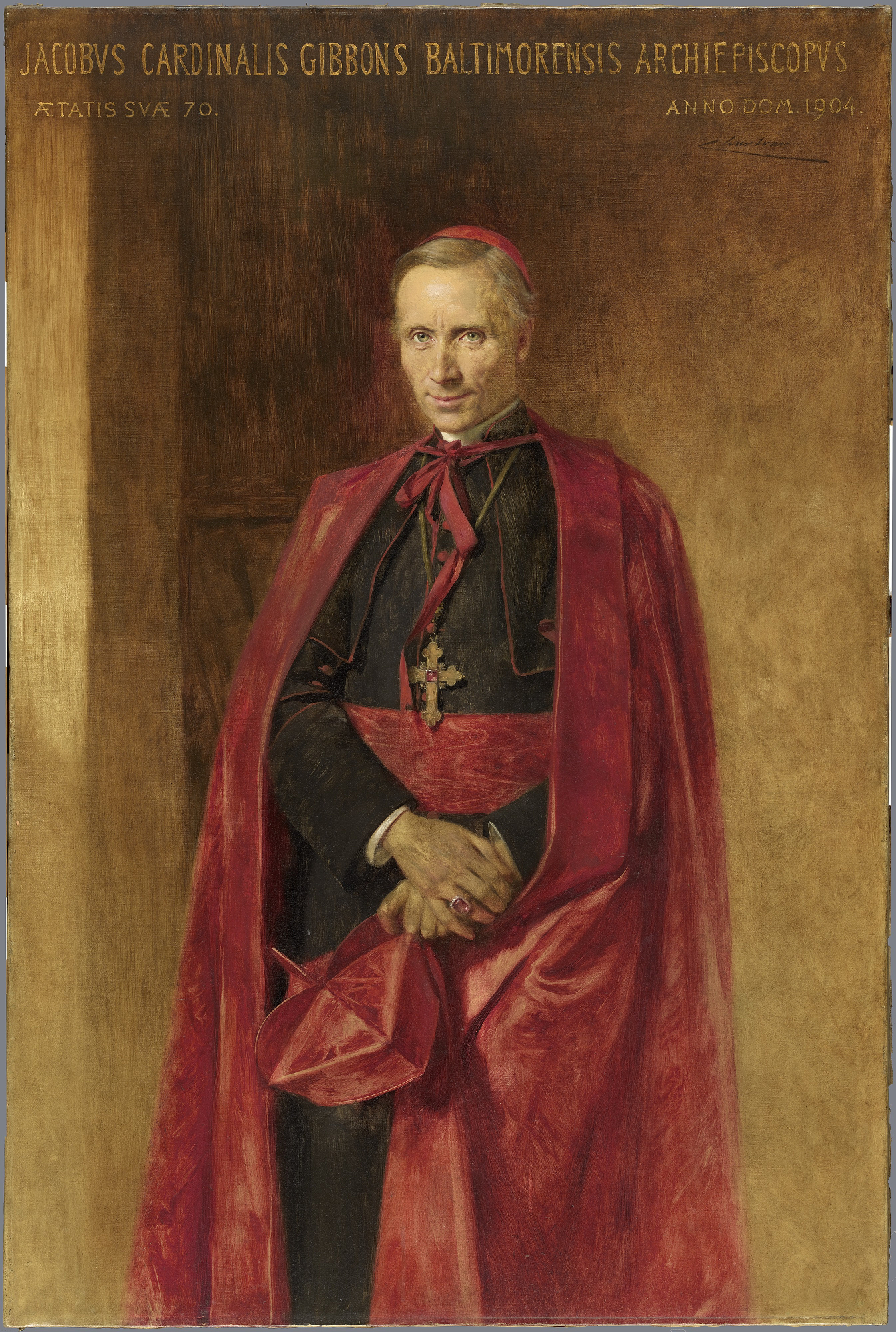
Cardinal James Gibbons (1904), National Portrait Gallery

== Personal life ==
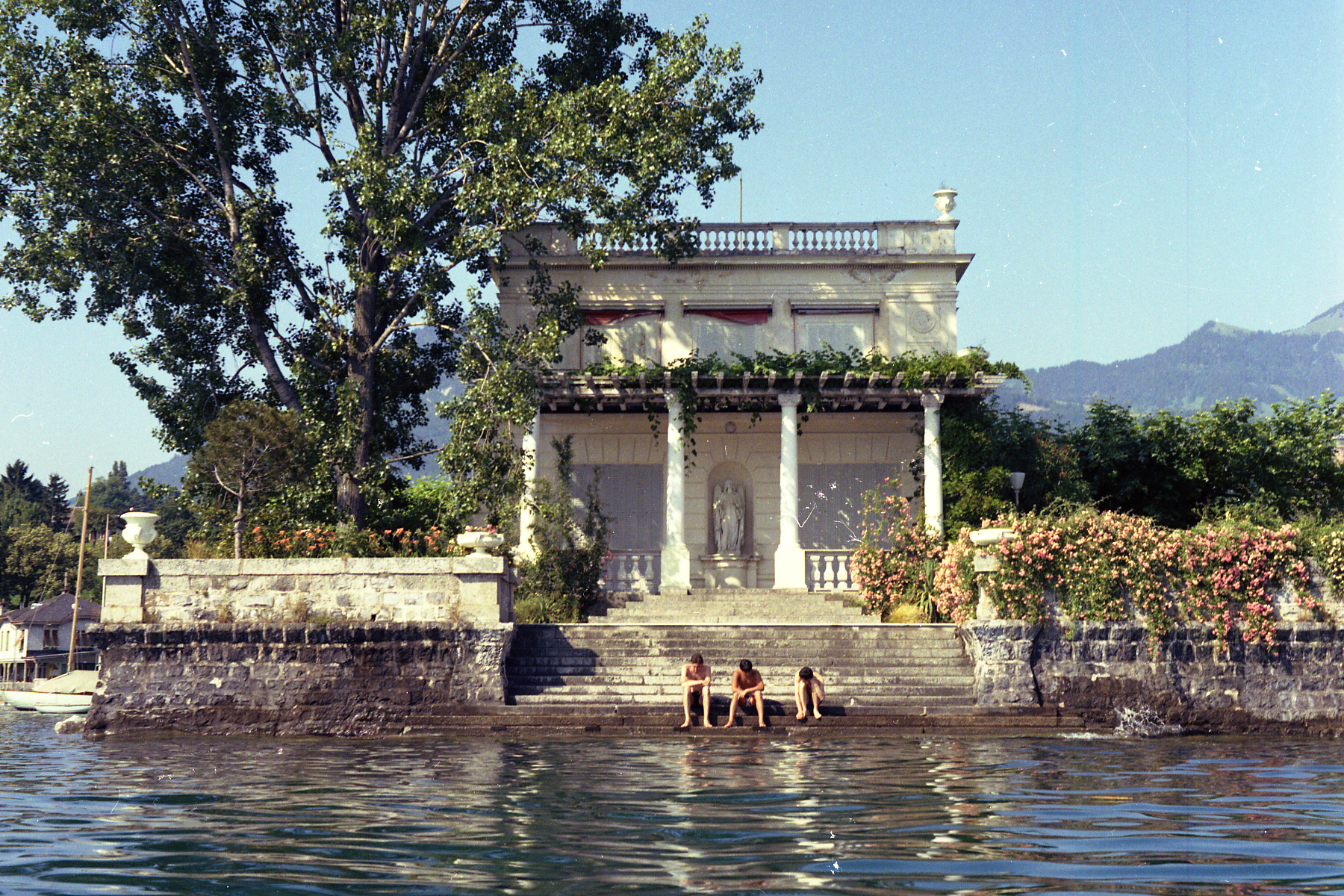
Villa Salagnon, 1968

Chartran was married to a woman who "descended from a famous family" and was "gifted with a voice of sweetness and considerable power and possessed of strong lyric ambition, which, however, she did not gratify by a career on the stage." Her portrait appeared in The Pall Mall Magazine in 1906.

In September 1900, Chartran acquired the Île de Salagnon (also known as "Swan Island"), one of the five islands on Lake Geneva, located between Vevey and Montreux. On the island, he had a Florentine villa built by architect Louis Villard, as well as a small port. There, Chartran organized sumptuous evenings with illustrious characters and fireworks. When he died, the island was taken over by a Russian count, a Zurich merchant, and then an American, Mary Shillito. Today it is known as Villa Salagnon.

His wife died just before his last visit to America in January 1906. Chartran died in Paris on 16 July 1907.

== See also ==
- Place des États-Unis
