= Liborio Prosperi =

Italian artist (1854–1928)

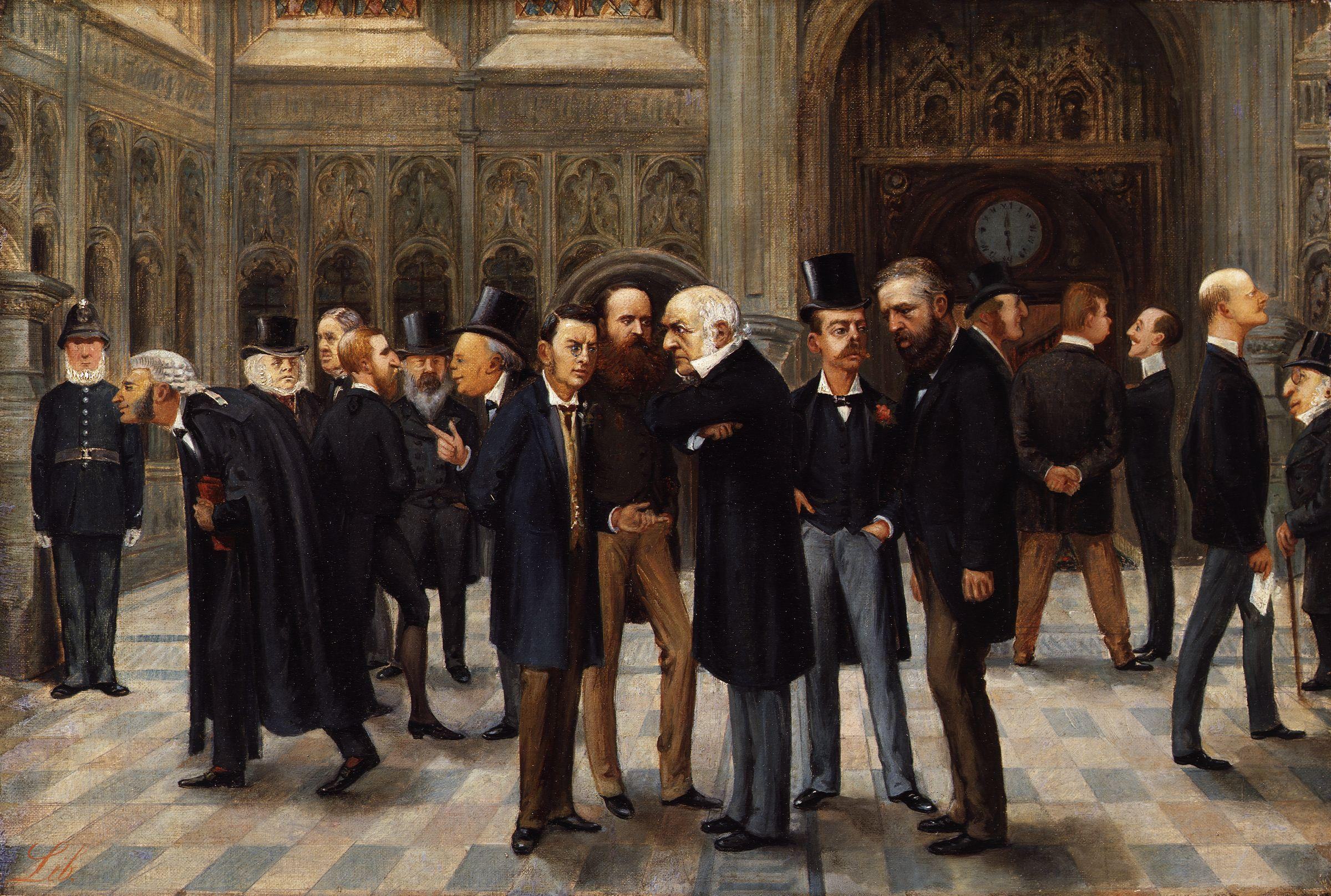
The Lobby of the House of Commons (1886) by 'Lib'

Liborio Prosperi ('Lib'), a.k.a. Liberio Prosperi (1854–1928), was a Papal States-born artist who belonged to a group of international artists producing caricatures for the British Vanity Fair magazine. He contributed 55 caricatures between 1885 and 1903, signed 'Lib', and concentrating mainly on the racing set.

Prosperi was born and died in Foligno, Papal States. His 1886 multi-portrait caricature The Lobby of the House of Commons is on view in the Victorian Gallery of the National Portrait Gallery in London.

The figures depicted by the artists of Vanity Fair included royalty, statesmen, scientists, authors, actors, soldiers, scholars and sporting men. The last issue of Vanity Fair appeared in 1914. In its forty-five year run, it provided readers a variety of memorable caricatures of Victorian and Edwardian personalities.

== Image gallery ==
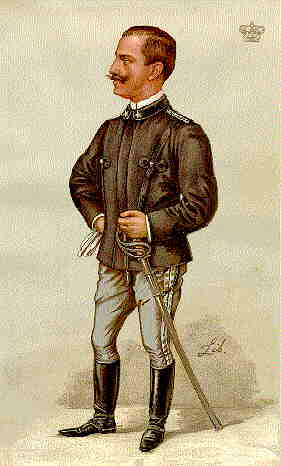
Victor Emmanuel III

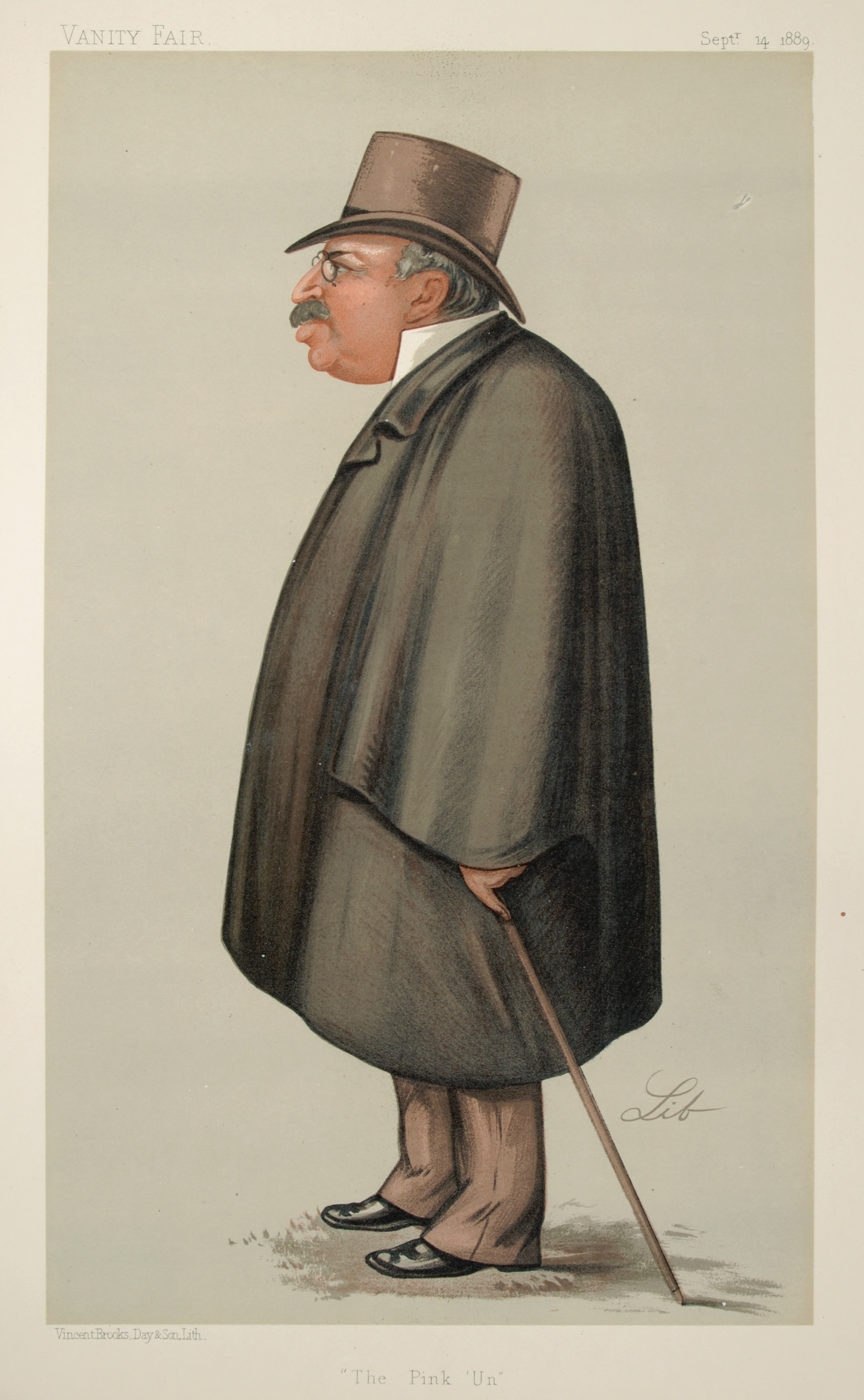
John Corlett, founder and editor of The Sporting Times of London
