= Vanity Fair (British magazine) =

British magazine, published 1868–1914

- Founder: Thomas Gibson Bowles
- Founded: 1868
- First issue: 7 November 1868
- Final issue: 5 February 1914
- Based in: London, England
- Language: English

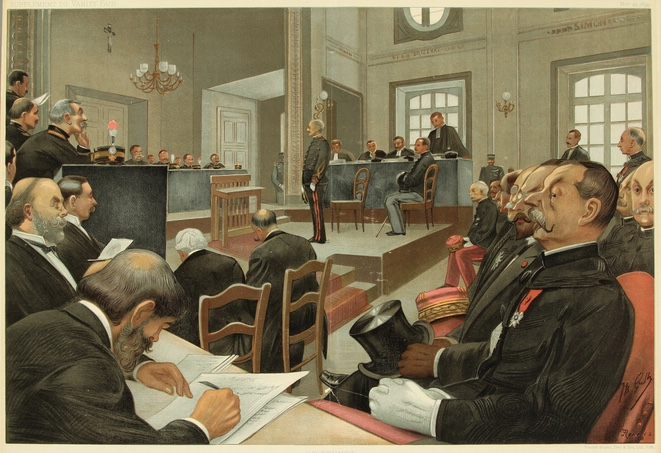
Winter supplement (23 November 1899); caricature of the trial of Dreyfus

Vanity Fair was a British weekly magazine that was published from 1868 to 1914. Founded by Thomas Gibson Bowles in London, the magazine included articles on fashion, theatre, current events as well as word games and serial fiction. The cream of the period's "society magazines", it is best known for its witty prose and caricatures of famous people of Victorian and Edwardian society, including artists, athletes, royalty, statesmen, scientists, authors, actors, business people and scholars.

Taking its title from Thackeray's popular satire on early 19th-century British society, Vanity Fair was not immediately successful and struggled with competition from rival publications. Bowles then promised his readers "Some Pictorial Wares of an entirely novel character", and on 30 January 1869, a full-page caricature of Benjamin Disraeli appeared. This was the first of over 2,300 caricatures to be published. According to the National Portrait Gallery in London, "Vanity Fair's illustrations, instantly recognizable in terms of style and size, led to a rapid increase in demand for the magazine. It gradually became a mark of honour to be the 'victim' of one of its numerous caricaturists. Bowles's witty accompanying texts, full of insights and innuendoes, certainly contributed towards the popularity of these images".

== History ==
When the history of the Victorian Era comes to be written in true perspective, the most faithful mirror and record of ... the spirit of the times will be sought and found in Vanity Fair.

— Vanity Fair illustrator "Spy".

Subtitled "A Weekly Show of Political, Social and Literary Wares", it was founded in 1868 by Thomas Gibson Bowles, who aimed to expose the contemporary vanities of Victorian society. Colonel Fred Burnaby provided £100 of the original £200 capital and, inspired by Thackeray's popular satire on early 19th-century British society, suggested the title Vanity Fair. The first issue appeared in London on 7 November 1868. It offered its readers articles on fashion, current events, the theatre, books, social events and the latest scandals, together with serial fiction, word games and other trivia.

Bowles wrote much of the magazine himself under various pseudonyms, such as "Jehu Junior", but contributors included Lewis Carroll, Arthur Hervey, Willie Wilde, Jessie Pope, P. G. Wodehouse (who also wrote for the unrelated Condé Nast magazine of the same name) and Bertram Fletcher Robinson (who was editor from June 1904 to October 1906). Lewis Carroll created a series of word ladder puzzles, which he then called "Doublets", which first appeared in the 29 March 1879 issue.

Thomas Allinson bought the magazine in 1911 from Frank Harris, by which time it was failing financially. He failed to revive it and the final issue of Vanity Fair appeared on 5 February 1914, after which it was merged into Hearth and Home.

== Caricatures ==
A full-page, colour lithograph of a contemporary celebrity or dignitary appeared in most issues, and it is for these caricatures that Vanity Fair is best known then and today. Subjects included artists, athletes, royalty, statesmen, scientists, authors, actors, soldiers, religious personalities, business people and scholars. More than two thousand of these images appeared, and they are considered the chief cultural legacy of the magazine, forming a pictorial record of the period. They were produced by an international group of artists, including Sir Max Beerbohm, Sir Leslie Ward (who signed his work "Spy" and "Drawl"), the Italians Carlo Pellegrini ("Singe" and "Ape"), Melchiorre Delfico ("Delfico"), Liborio Prosperi ("Lib"), the Florentine artist and critic Adriano Cecioni, the French artists James Tissot ("Coïdé"), Prosper d'Épinay ("Nemo") and the American Thomas Nast.

== Image gallery ==
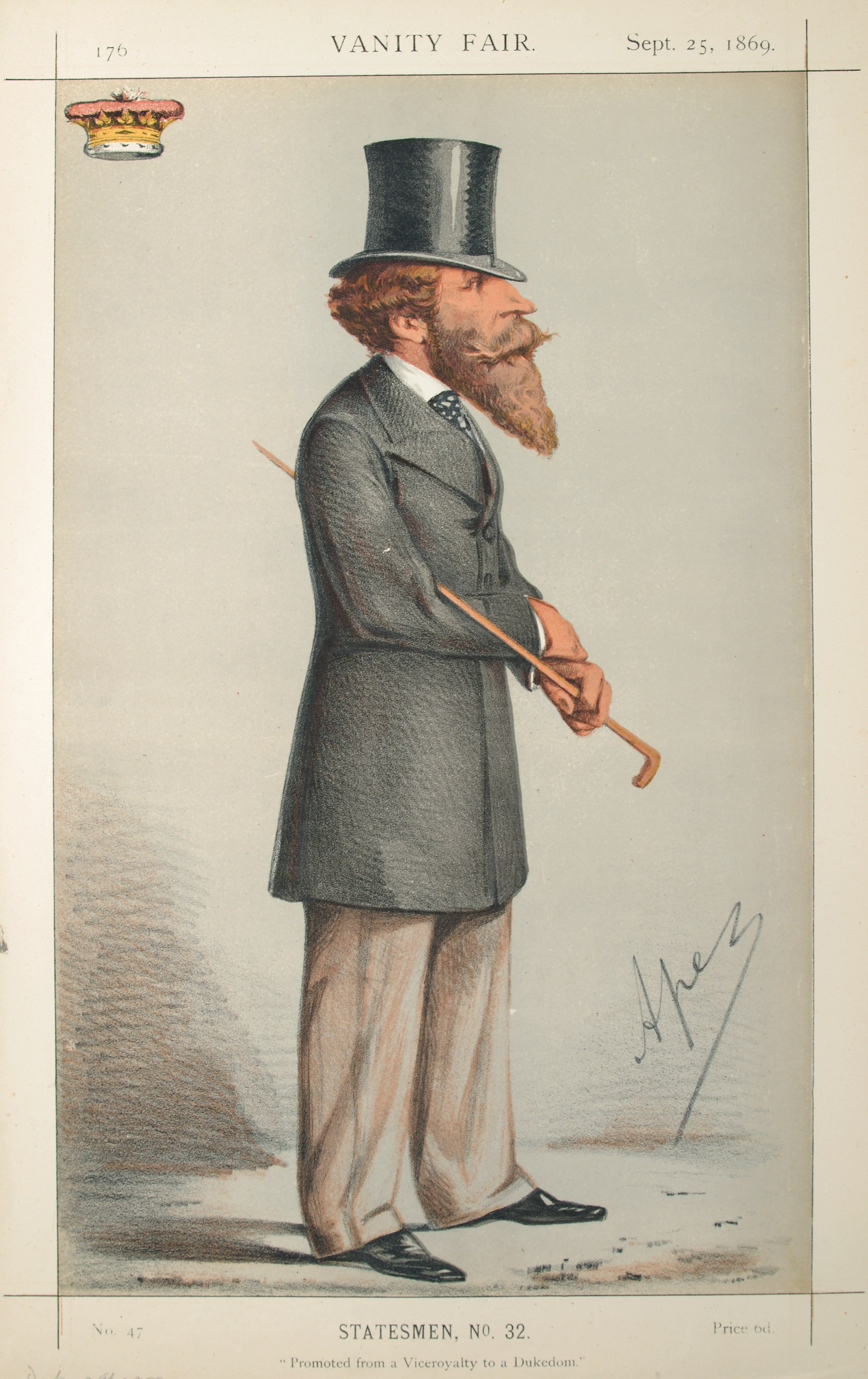
The Duke of Abercorn by Carlo Pellegrini ("Ape") in the 25 September 1869 issue

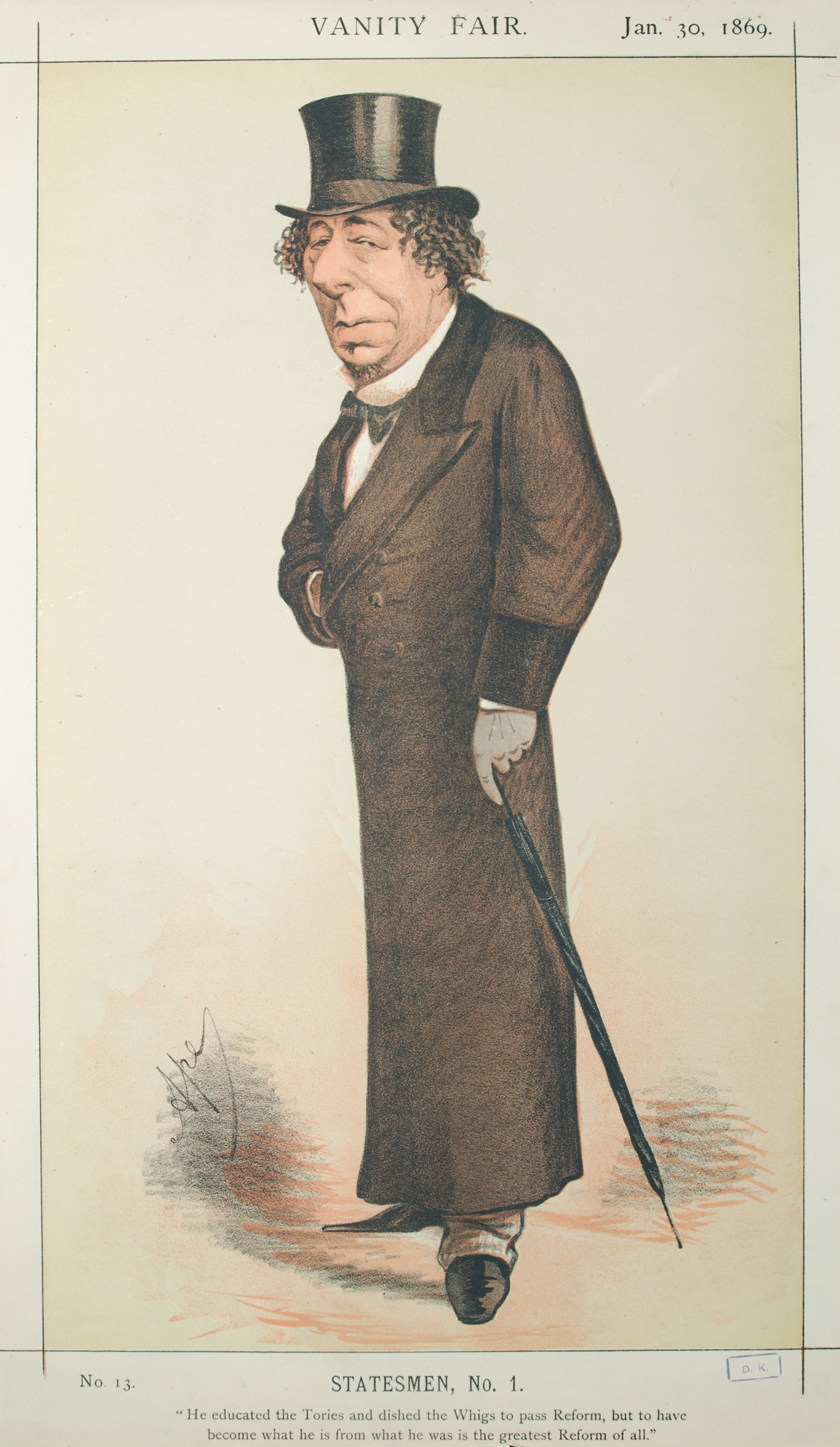
Benjamin Disraeli by Carlo Pellegrini in the 30 January 1869 issue

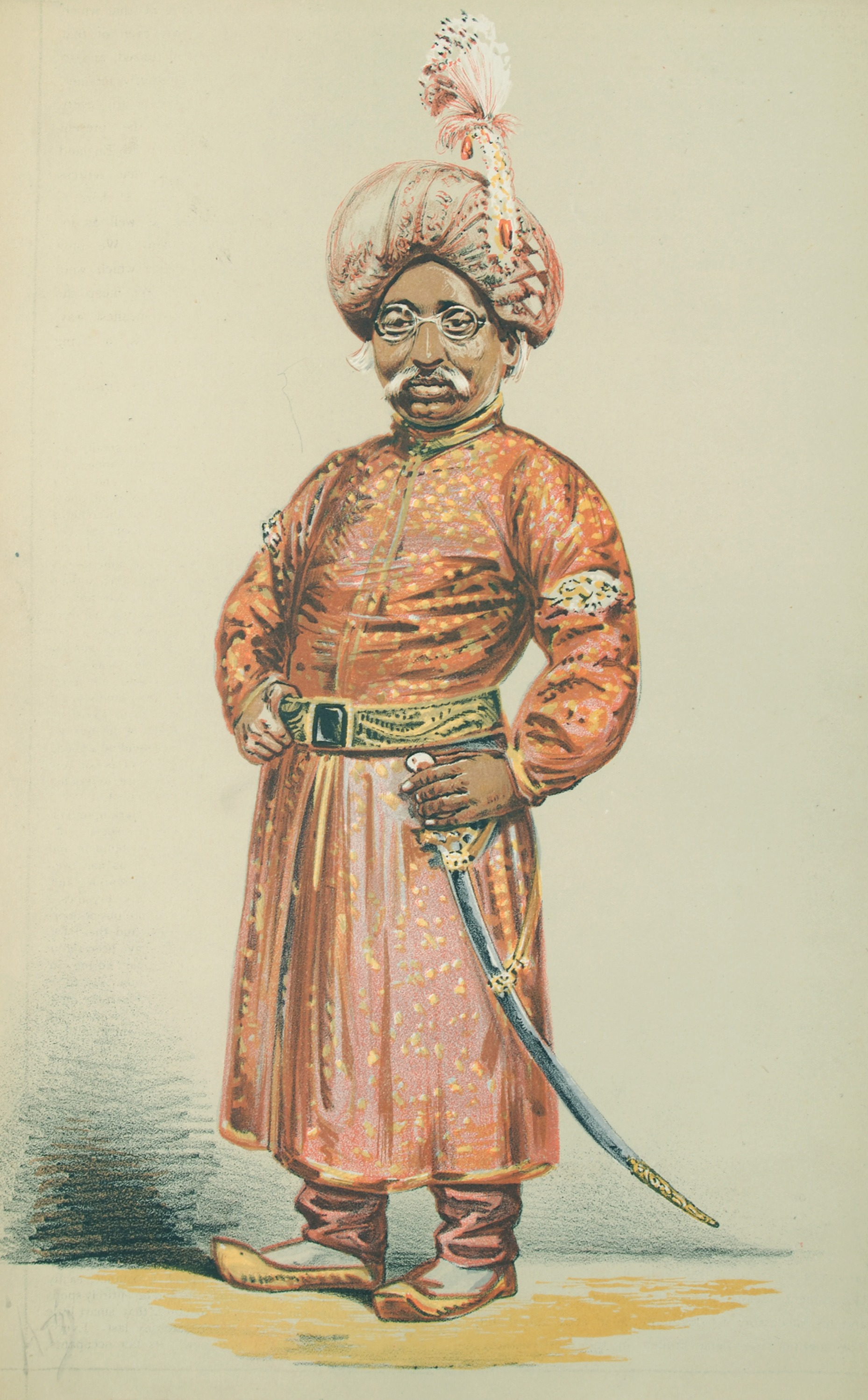
Mansur Ali Khan of Bengal by Alfred Thompson ("Ἀτη") in the 16 April 1870 issue

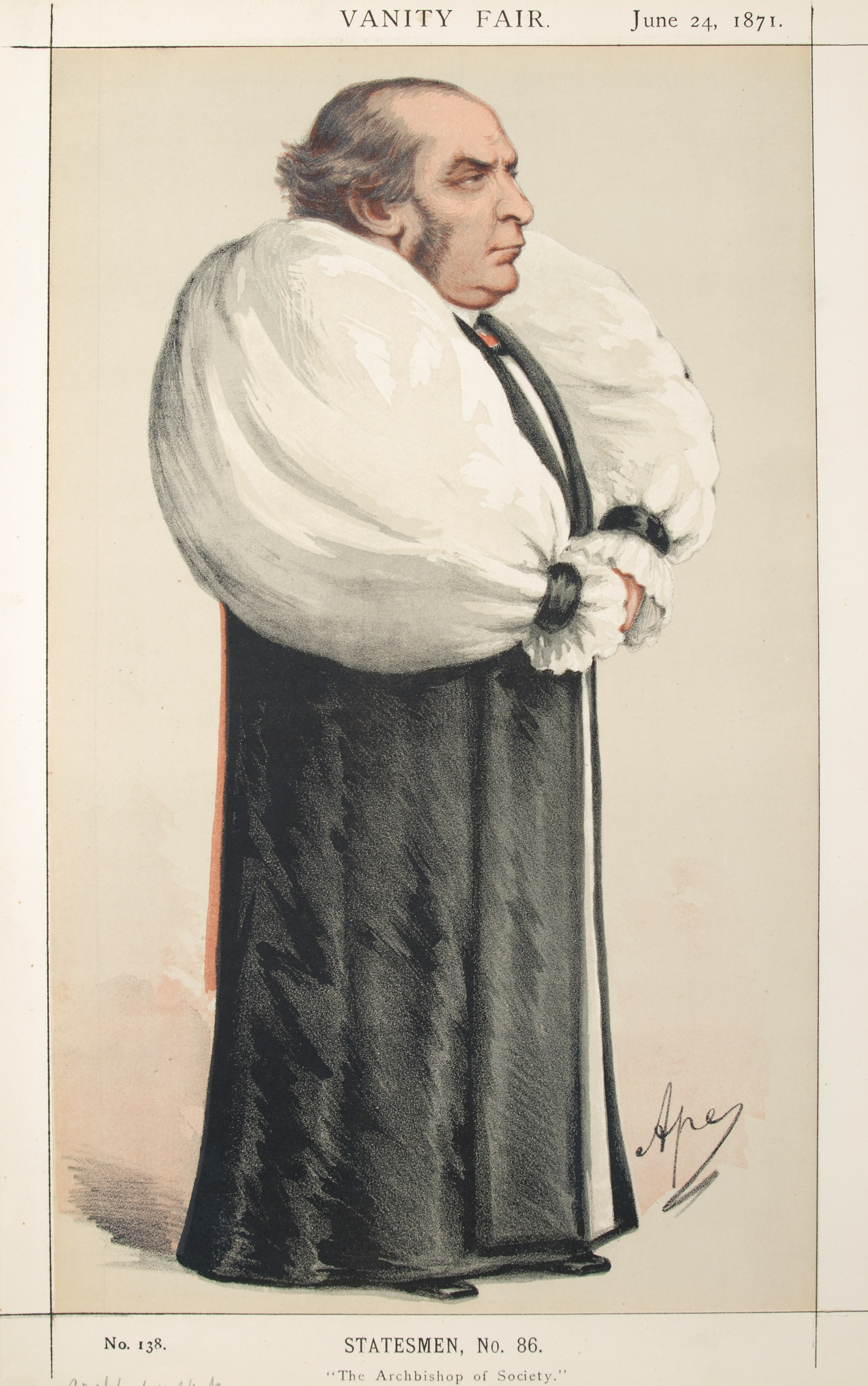
William Thomson, Archbishop of York, by Carlo Pellegrini in the 24 June 1871 issue

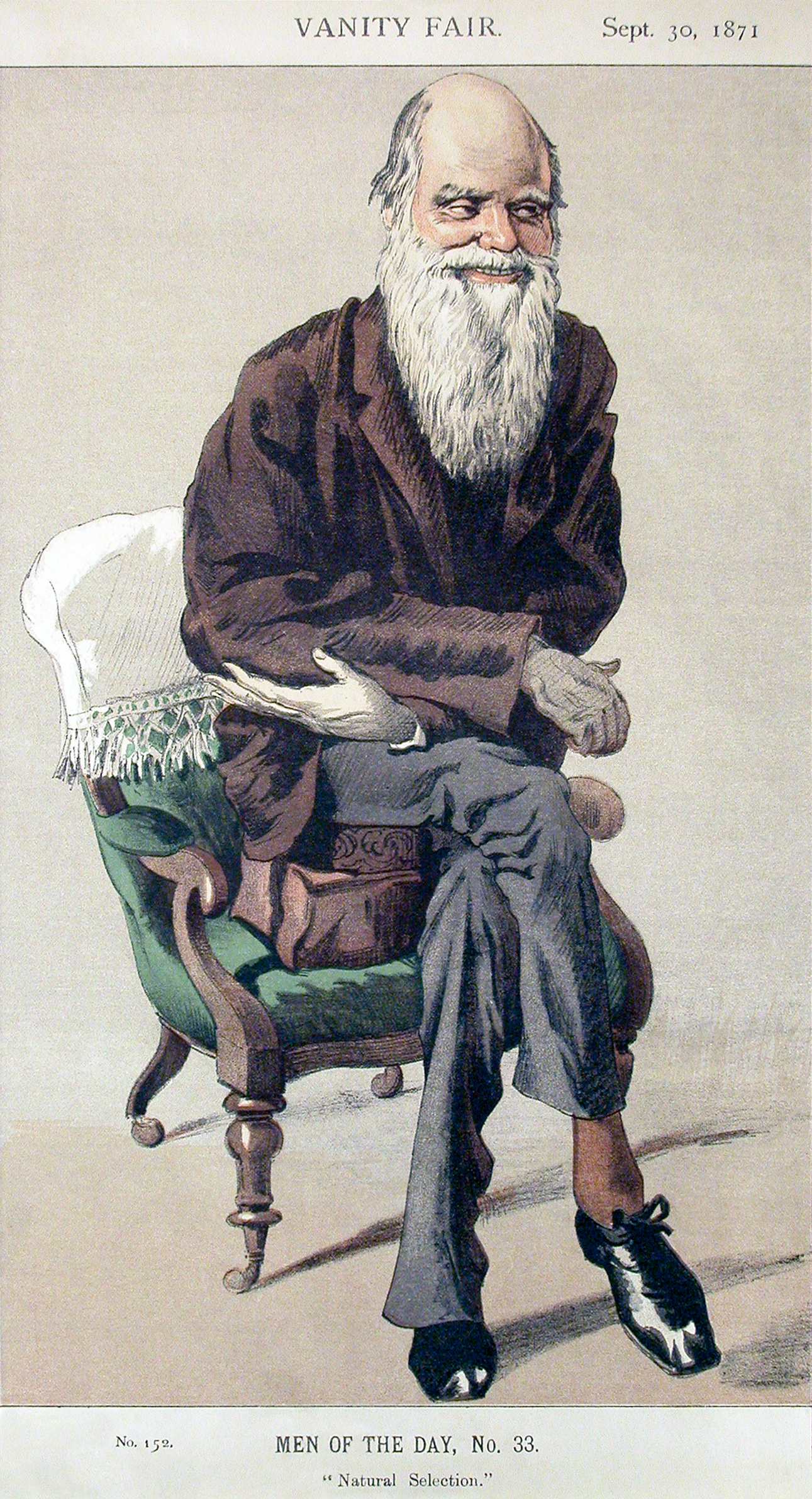
Charles Darwin by James Tissot ("Coïdé") in the 30 September 1871 issue

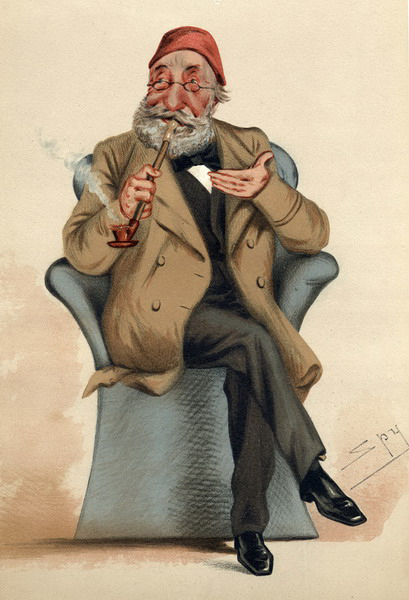
Caricature of Midhat Pasha by Leslie Ward ("Spy") in the 30 June 1877 issue

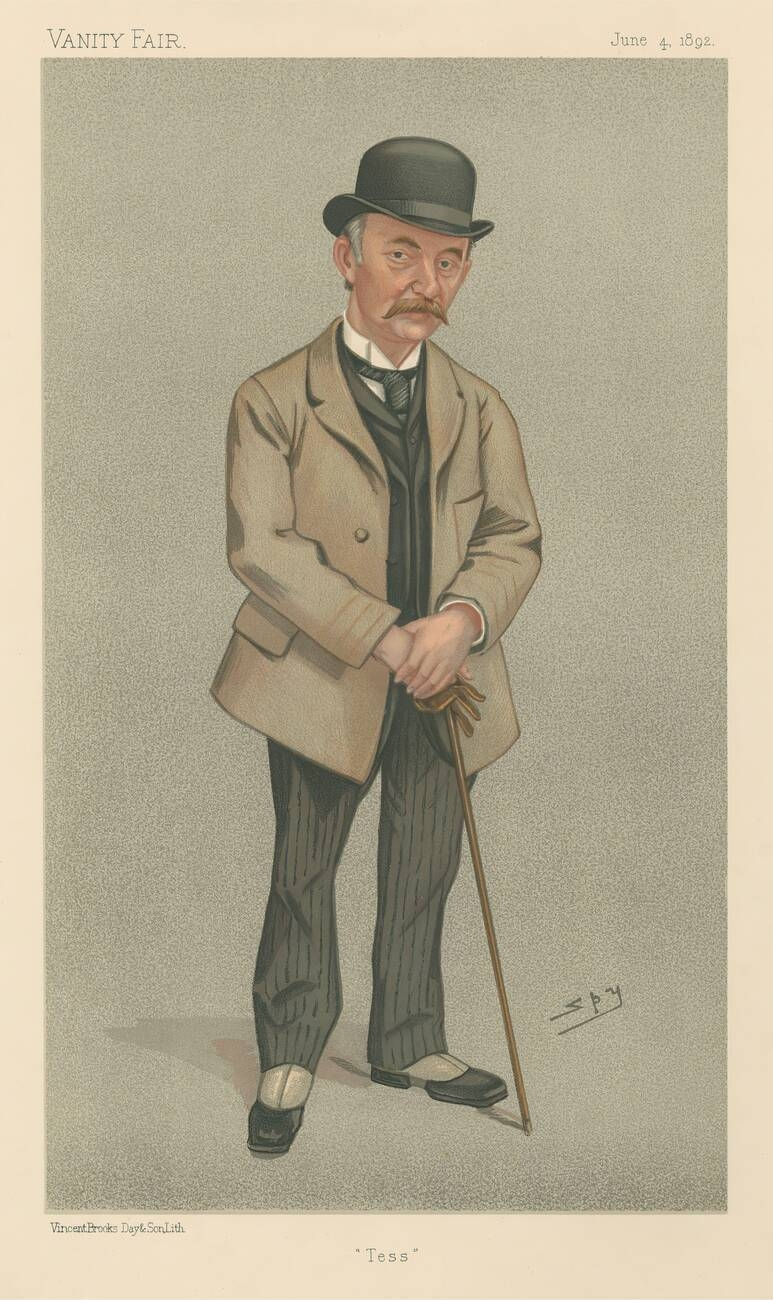
Thomas Hardy caricature by Leslie Ward in the 4 June 1892 issue

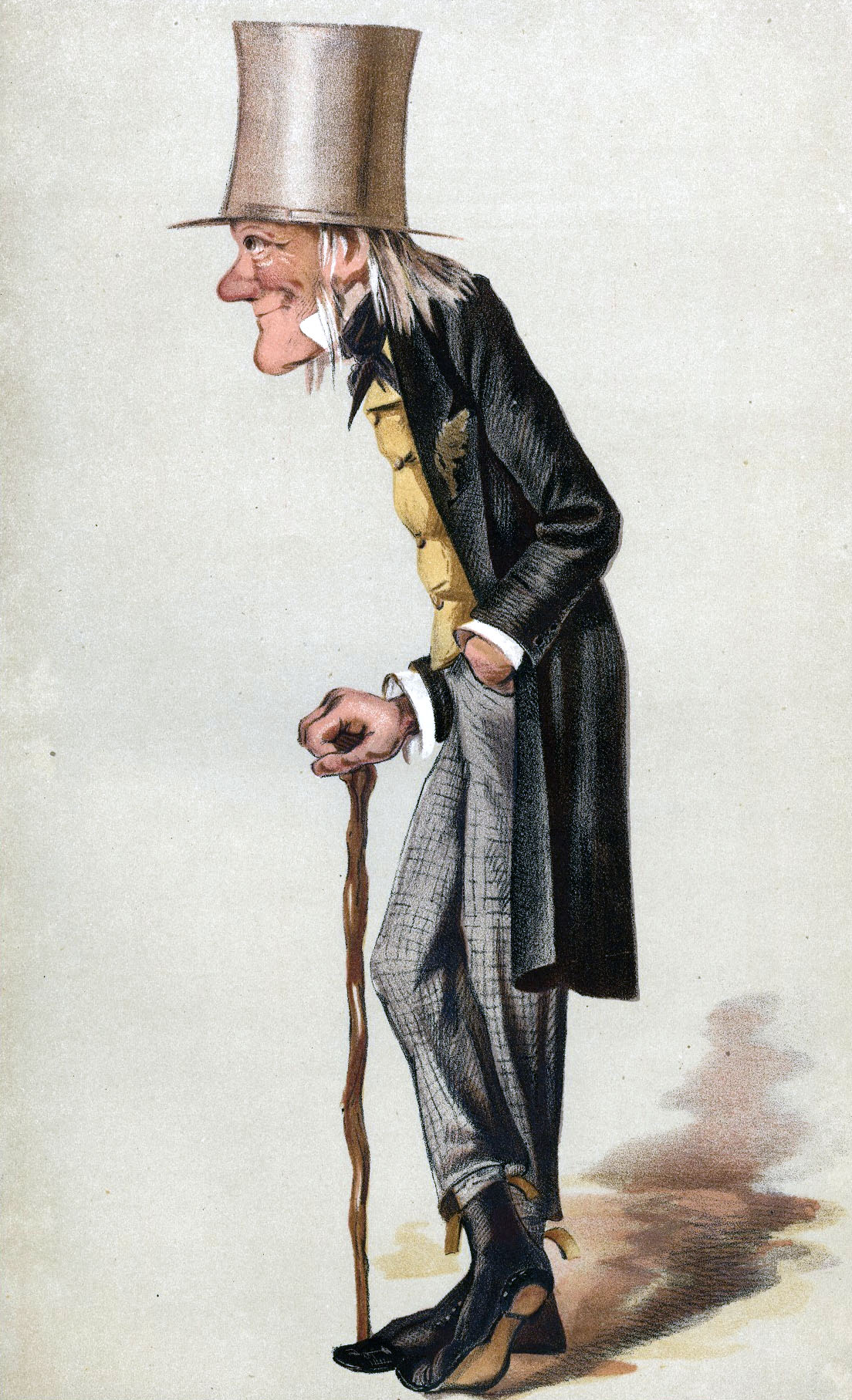
Captioned "Old Bones", caricature of an elderly Richard Owen in 1873

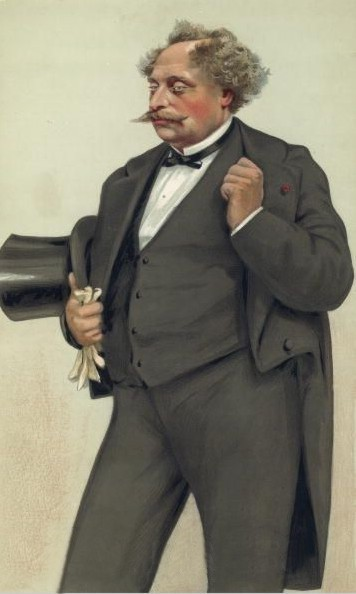
Alexandre Dumas fils by Théobald Chartran in the 27 December 1879 issue

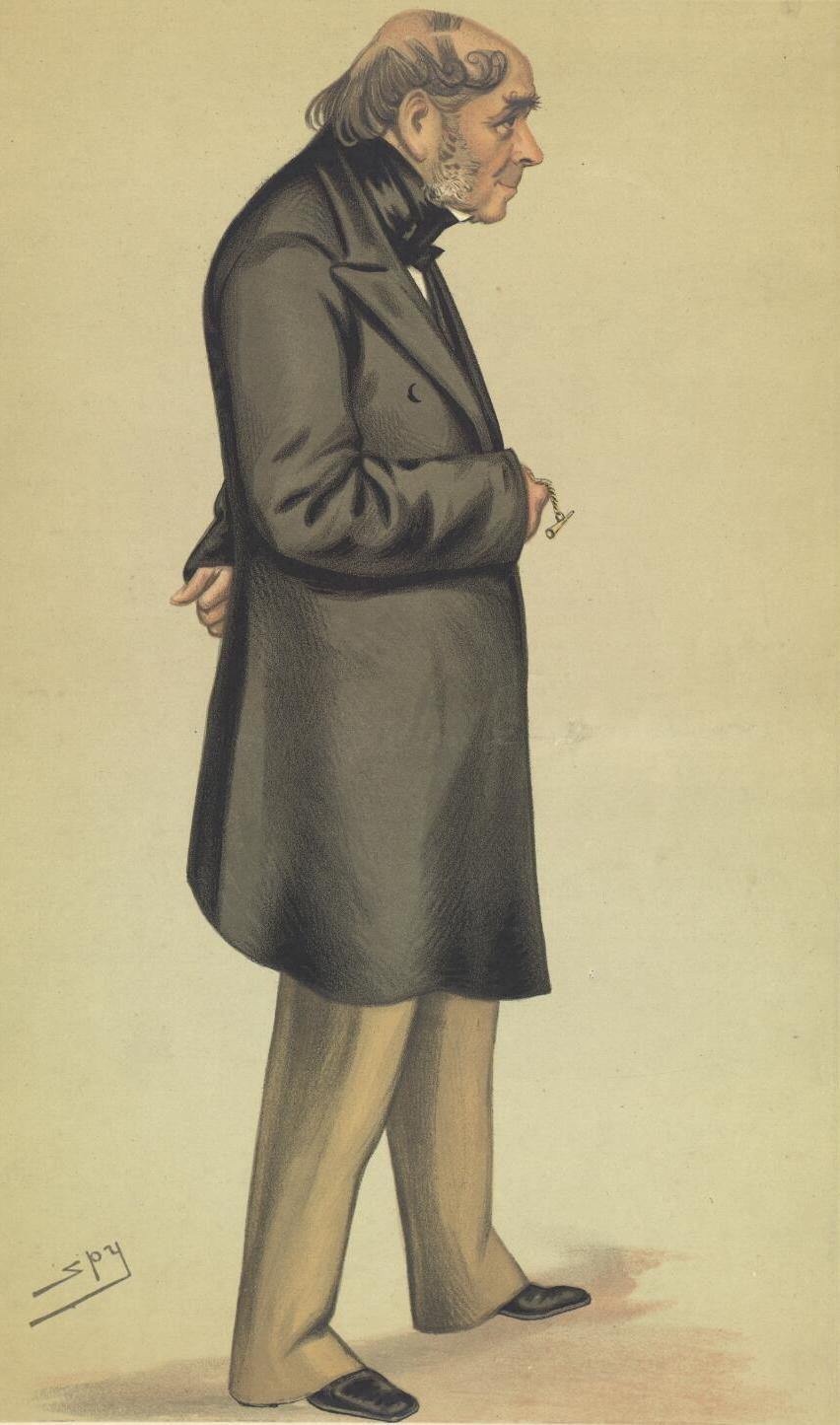
Captioned "Steel", Sir Henry Bessemer by Leslie Ward in the 6 November 1880 issue

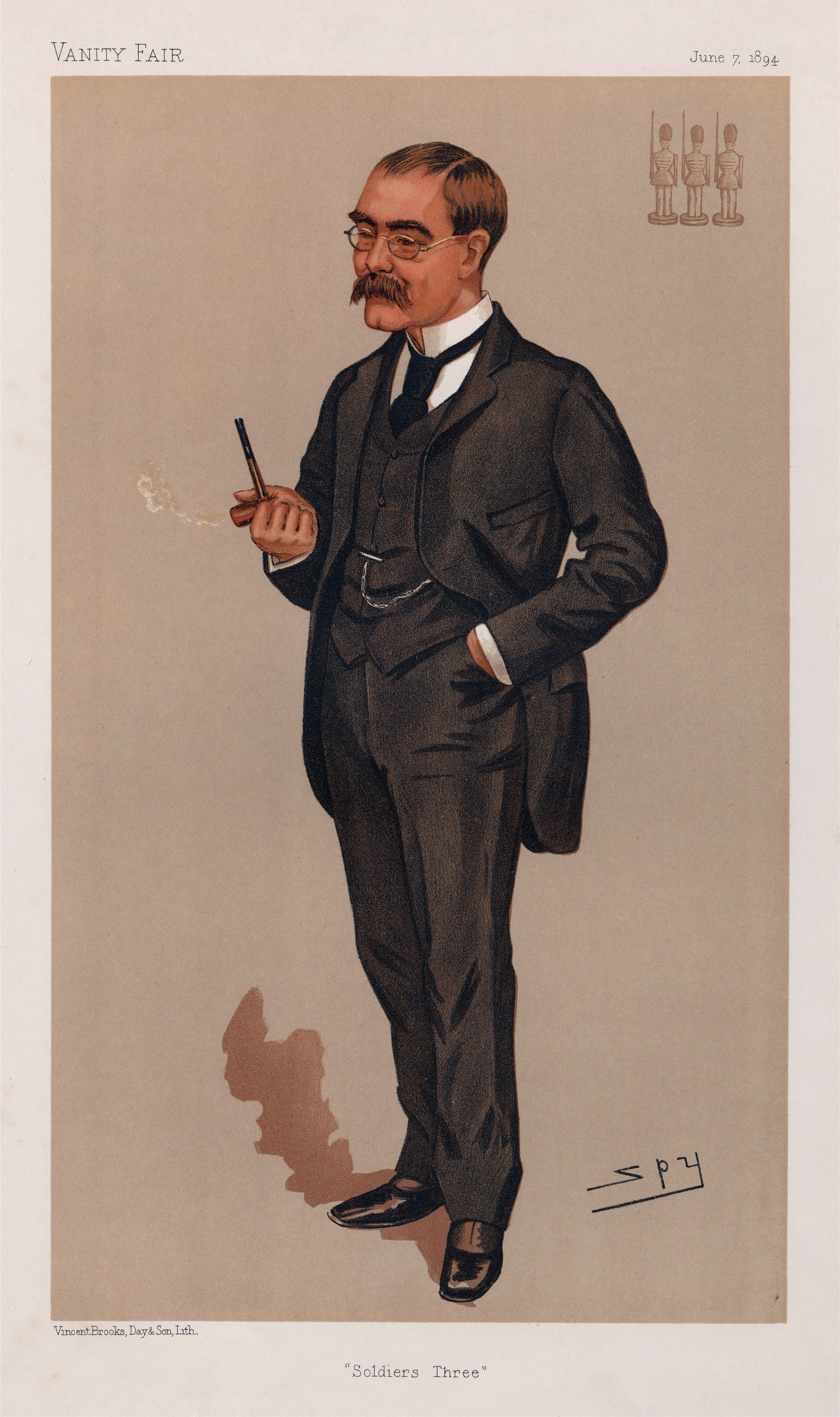
Rudyard Kipling by Leslie Ward on 7 June 1894

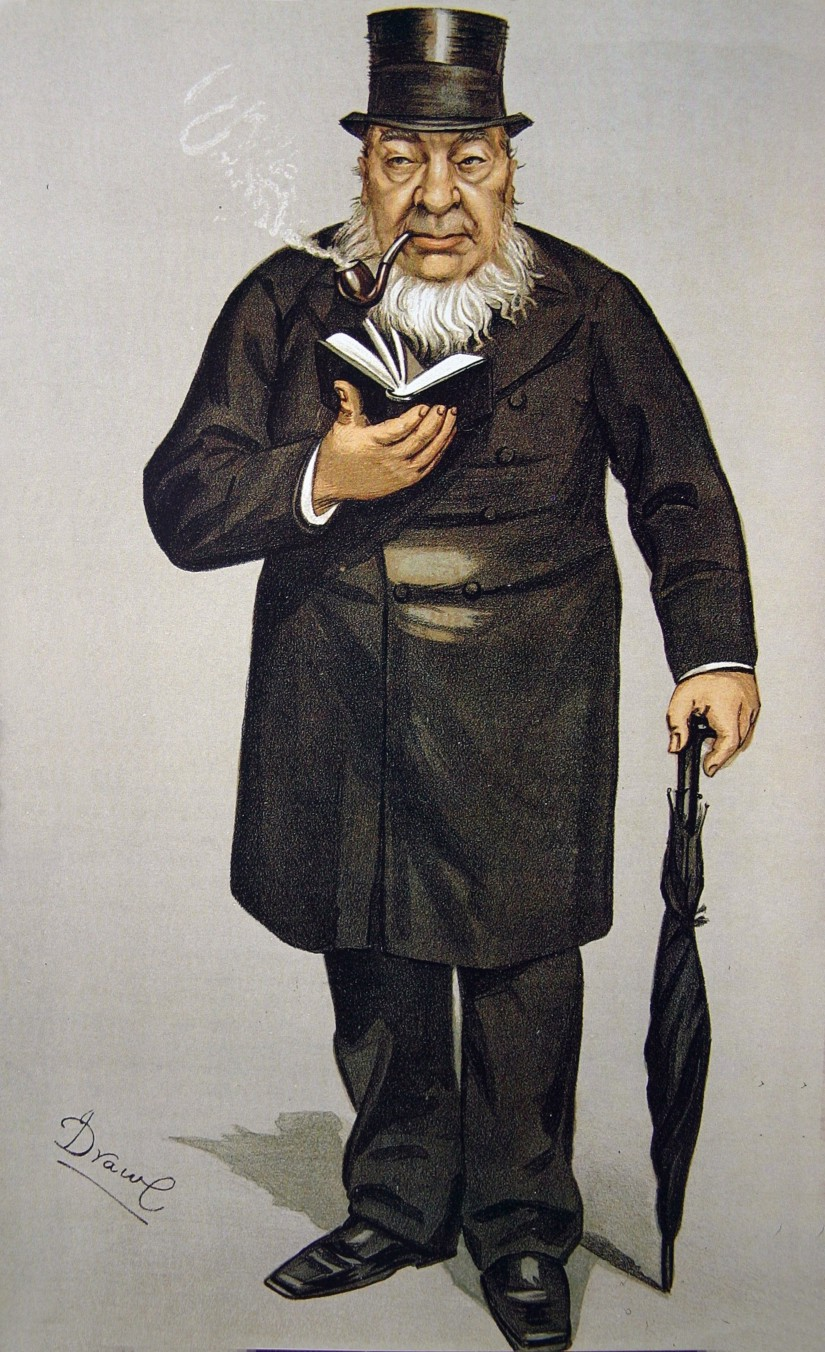
President Paul Kruger of the South African Republic by Leslie Ward in the 8 March 1900 issue

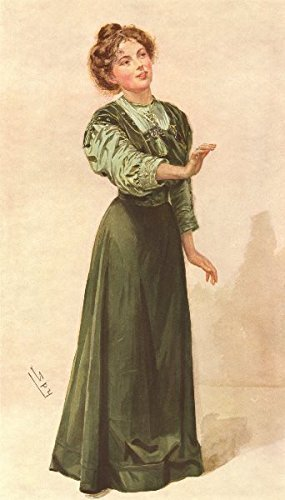
Suffragette Christabel Pankhurst in the 15 June 1910 issue

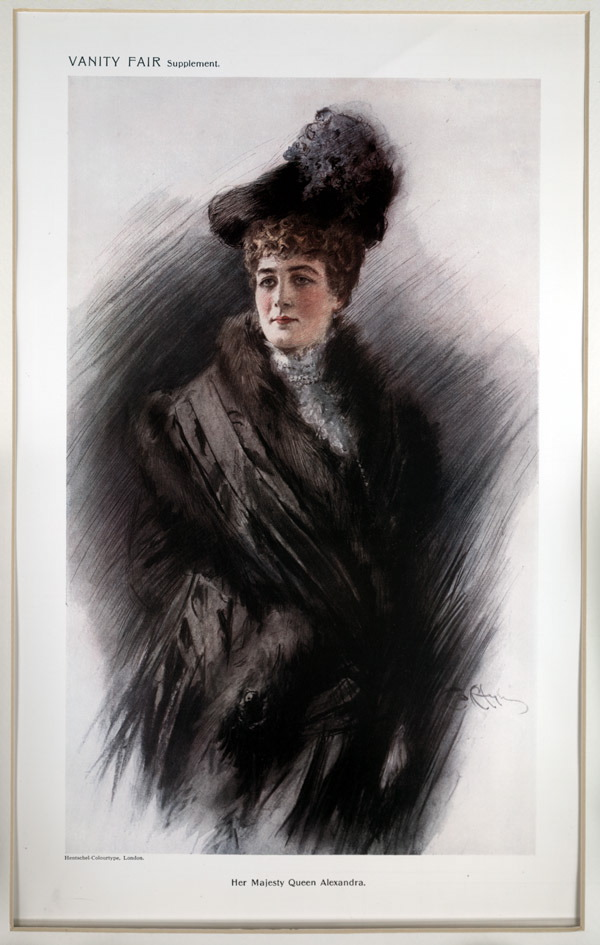
Queen Alexandra (unsigned) in the 7 June 1911 issue

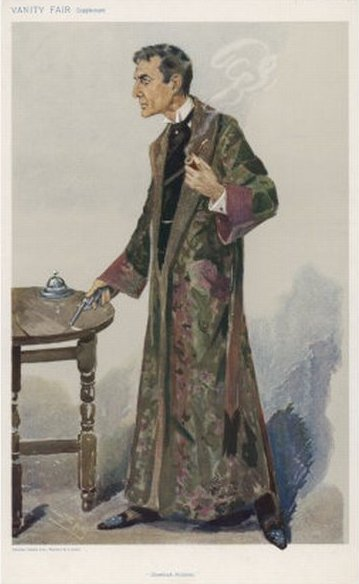
William Gillette playing Sherlock Holmes, drawn by Leslie Ward in the 27 February 1907 issue

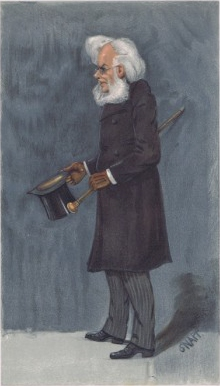
Henrik Ibsen by "Snapp" in the 12 December 1901 issue

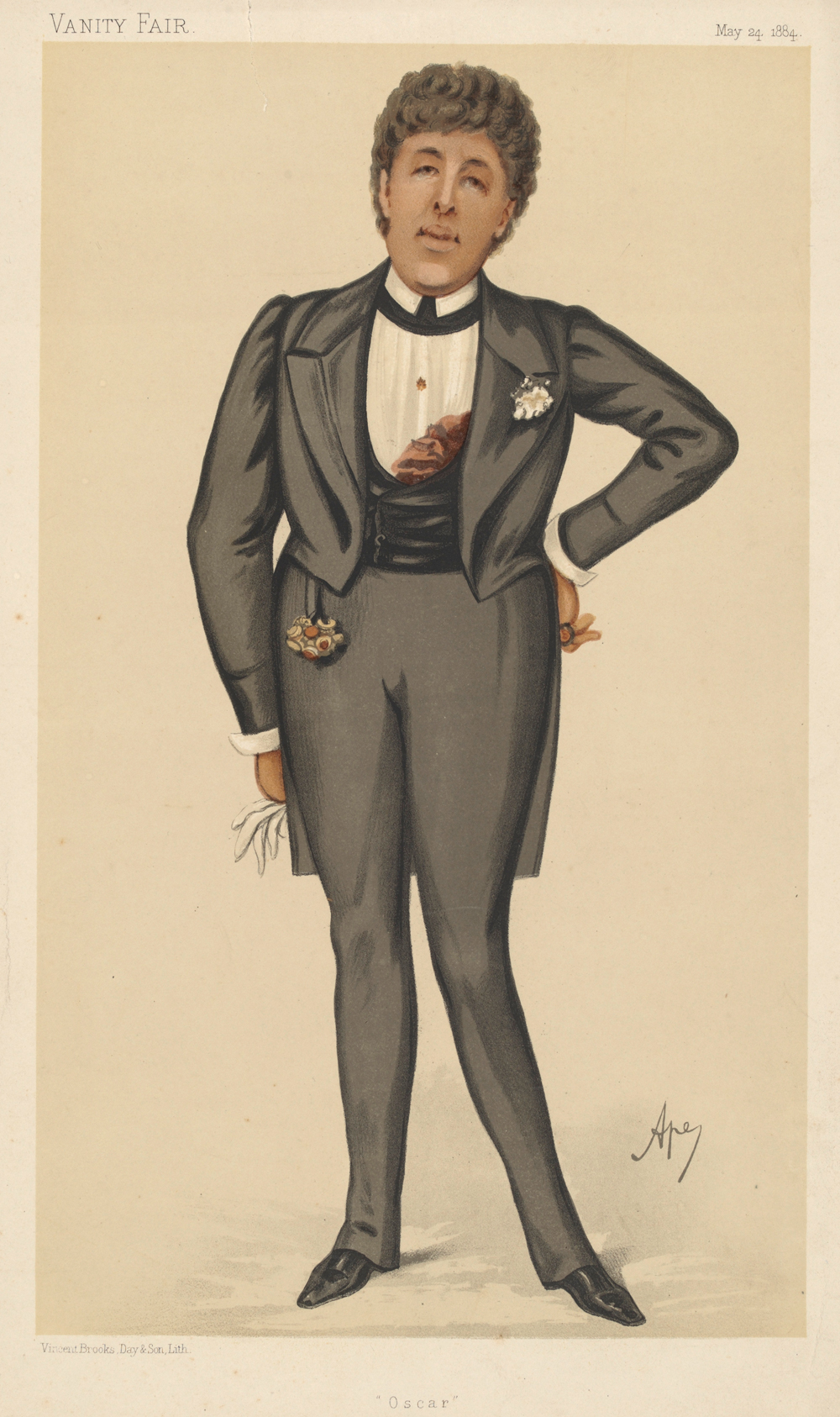
Oscar Wilde by Carlo Pellegrini in issue 812, April 1884

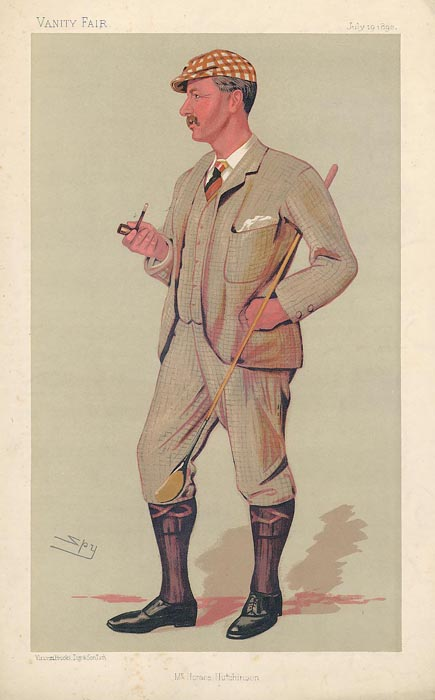
Caricature of golfer Horace Hutchinson by Leslie Ward on 19 July 1890

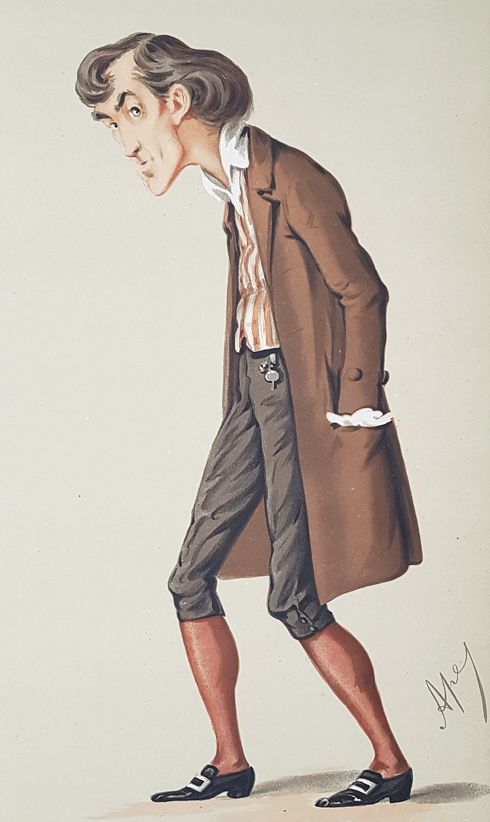
Caricature of Henry Irving in the melodrama The Bells, in the 19 December 1874 issue

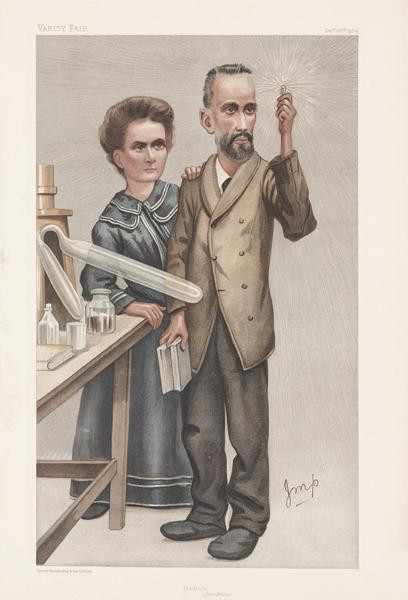
Caricature of Pierre and Marie Curie in the 22 December 1904 issue

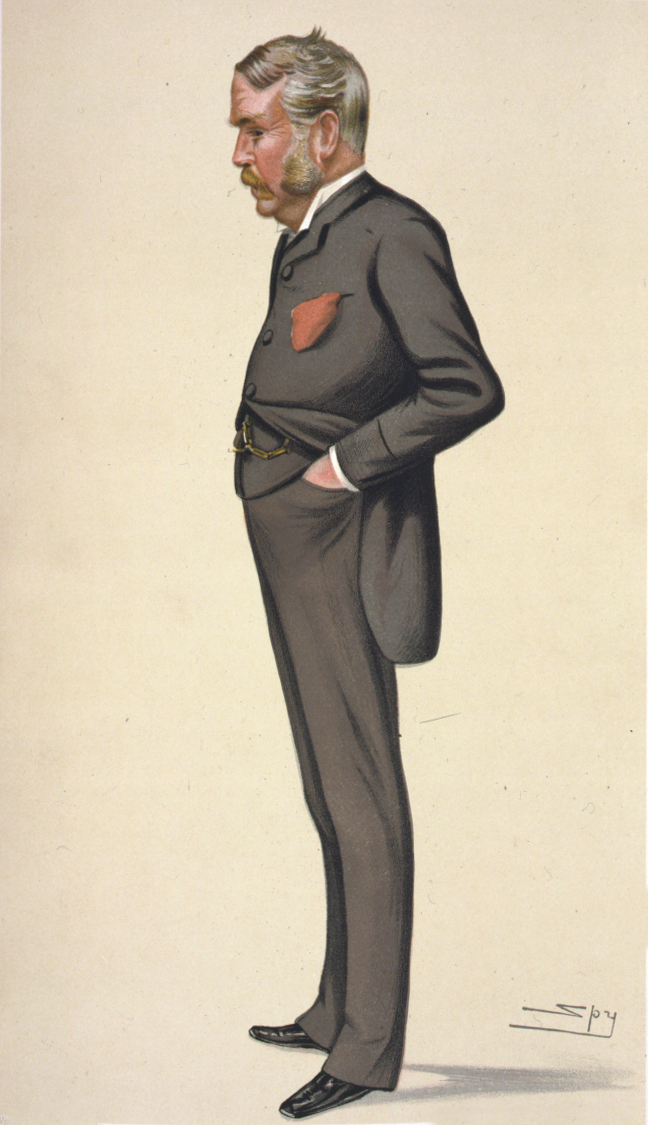
W. S. Gilbert by Leslie Ward, published on 21 May 1881

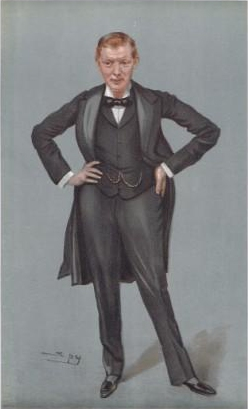
Winston Churchill by Leslie Ward, 27 September 1900

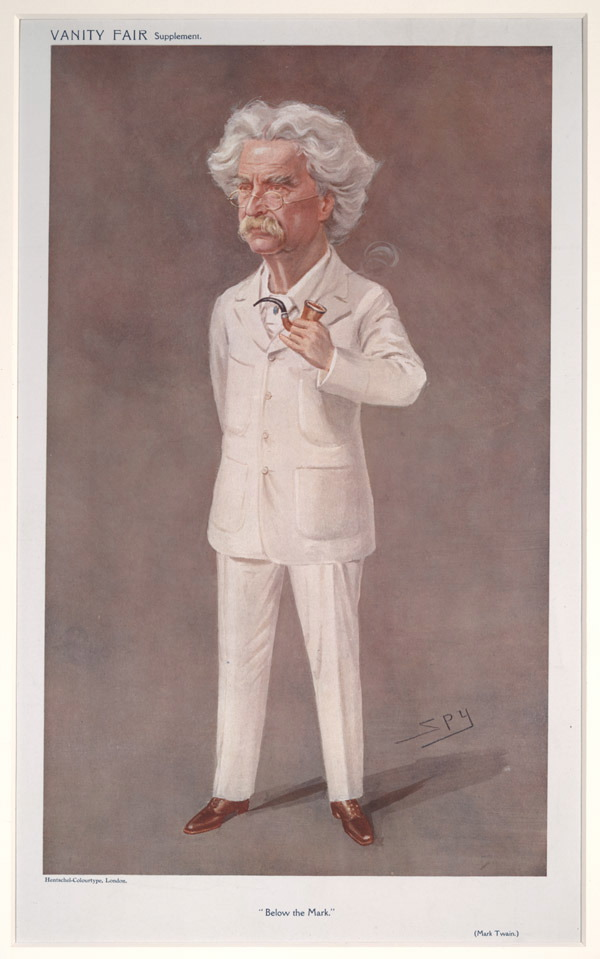
Mark Twain by Leslie Ward on 13 May 1908

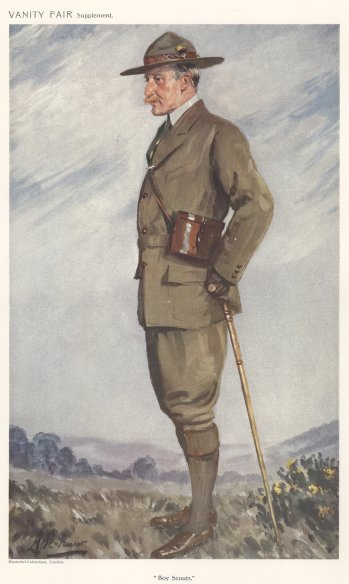
Captioned "Boy Scouts", Robert Baden-Powell in the 19 April 1911 issue

== See also ==
- List of Vanity Fair artists
- List of Vanity Fair caricatures
- The Rowers of Vanity Fair Wikibook gives a history of the magazine with focus on sportsmen
