= Jelf =

Jelf is a surname. Notable people with the surname include:

- Arthur Richard Jelf (1837–1917), English judge
- Ernest Arthur Jelf (1868–1949), writer and King's Remembrancer
- Hector Jelf (1917– 1997), English first-class cricketer and British colonial official in Africa
- Henry Jelf (1877–1944), English cricketer and Royal Navy officer
- Richard William Jelf (1798–1871), British academic and academic administrator
- Wilfrid Jelf (1880–1933), Canadian cricketer
- William Edward Jelf (1811–1875), English churchman and academic

== See also ==
- Jelfs
