= Richard Jelf =

Richard Jelf may refer to:

- Richard William Jelf (1798–1871), principal of King's College, London
- Richard Henry Jelf (1844–1913), British Army officer
