= George Edward Jelf =

George Edward Jelf (1834–1908) was an English churchman and Master of Charterhouse.

== Life ==
The eldest son of seven children of Richard William Jelf and Emmy, Countess of Schlippenbach, lady-in-waiting to Frederica, Duchess of Cumberland, he was born on 19 January 1834 at Berlin, where his father was tutor to Prince George of Cumberland. His younger brothers were Arthur Richard Jelf, and Richard Henry Jelf, governor of the Royal Military Academy, Woolwich.

Educated at preparatory schools in Hammersmith and Brighton, Jelf was admitted to Charterhouse School under Augustus Saunders in 1847. He matriculated at Christ Church, Oxford, on 2 June 1852. He held a studentship at Christ Church from 1852 to 1861, and won a first class in classical moderations in 1854. He graduated B.A. with a third class in lit. hum. in 1856, and proceeded M.A. in 1859 and D.D. in 1907.

In 1857 Jelf entered Wells Theological College, and the following year he was ordained deacon, becoming priest in 1859. He held curacies at St Michael's, Highgate (1858–60), St James's, Clapton (1860–66), and at Aylesbury (1866–68). On the presentation of Roundell Palmer, 1st Earl of Selborne, he became vicar of Blackmoor, Hampshire, in 1868, and in 1874 he accepted from Lord Braybrooke the living of Saffron Walden. In 1878 he was made an honorary canon of St Albans Cathedral.

A connection with Rochester Cathedral began with Jelf's appointment in 1880 to a residentiary canonry, a position he held for twenty-seven years. From 1895 he acted as proctor in Convocation for the dean and chapter of Rochester; but he took little part in current controversy. He continued his parish work at Saffron Walden till 1882, and from 1883 to 1889 he had the charge of St Mary's Island Church, Chatham; subsequently he devoted himself to mission work in the diocese. For financial reasons he took on extra clerical duties: the rectory of Wiggonholt near Pulborough in Sussex (1896–7); and when this proved too much, from 1897 St German's, Blackheath.

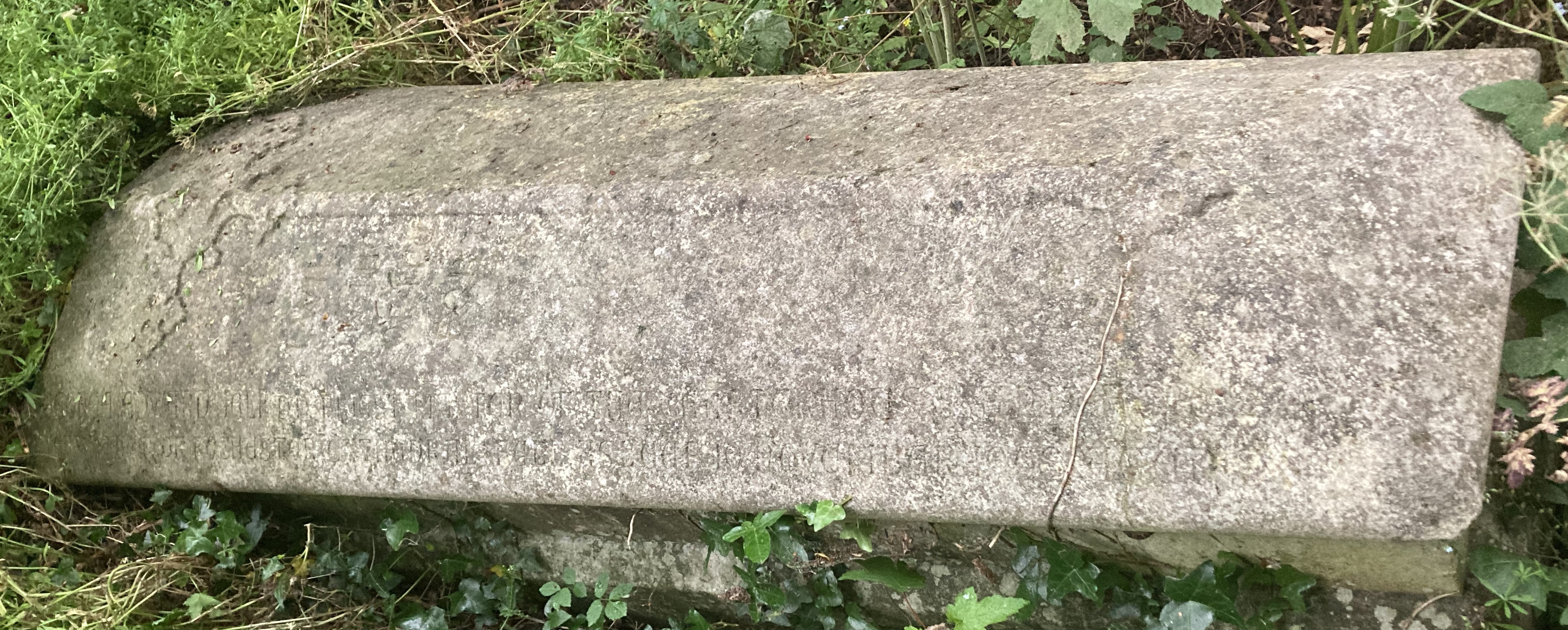
Grave of George Edward Jelf in Highgate Cemetery

In 1904 Jelf resigned his Blackheath benefice and retired to Rochester; but in 1907 he was appointed Master of Charterhouse in succession to William Haig Brown. He was in poor health shortly after moving to London, and he died on 19 November 1908 at the Master's lodge, Charterhouse. He was buried on the eastern side of Highgate Cemetery, and on the same day a memorial service was held in Rochester cathedral.

== Works ==
A moderate high churchman, Jelf was a friend and godson of Edward Bouverie Pusey, whose Christus consolator (1883) he edited. As a devotional writer, he had influence through popular homiletic publications including:

- The Secret Trials of the Christian Life, 1873.
- The Rule of God's Commandments, 1878.
- The Consolations of the Christian Seasons, 1880.
- Work and Worship, 1888, cathedral sermons.
- Mother, Home and Heaven, 1891.
- Sound Words, their Form and Spirit, 1907, addresses on the Book of Common Prayer.

== Family ==
Jelf married:

1. in 1861 Fanny (died 1865), daughter of G. A. Crawley of Highgate, by whom he had one surviving son, and three daughters who died of scarlet fever in 1871;
2. in 1876 Katherine Frances, younger daughter of Charles Browne Dalton, vicar of St. Michael's, Highgate, who survived him; by her he had three sons and four daughters. Their son Sir Arthur Selborne Jelf was a colonial administrator.

Katherine Jelf published George Edward Jelf: A Memoir (1909).

== Notes ==
Attribution

This article incorporates text from a publication now in the public domain: Lee, Sidney, ed. (1912). "Jelf, George Edward". Dictionary of National Biography (2nd supplement). Vol. 2. London: Smith, Elder & Co.
