= Callisher v Bischoffsheim =

English contract law case

- Full case name: Callisher v Bischoffsheim
- Decided: 6 June 1870
- Citation: (1869-70) LR 5 QB 449

Court membership
- Judges sitting: Lord Cockburn LCJ, Blackburn, J, Lush J and Mellor J

Keywords
- Duty of care

Callisher v Bischoffsheim (1869–70) LR 5 QB 449 is an English contract law case concerning consideration. It held that the compromise of a disputed claim made bonâ fide is a good consideration for a promise, even if it ultimately appears that the claim was wholly unfounded.

== Facts ==
Callisher alleged that money was owed to him from the Government of Honduras, and was about to take proceedings to enforce payment. In consideration that the plaintiff would forbear taking such proceedings for an agreed time, the defendant promised to deliver to Callisher a set of Honduras Railway Loan Bonds. But then, they did not deliver the debentures, and argued that their promise to do so was unenforceable because the original suit was groundless.

== Judgment ==
The Queen's Bench held the contract was enforceable because even if the suit was groundless, forbearing to sue could count as a valuable consideration. Lord Chief Justice Cockburn said the following:

Our judgment must be for the plaintiff. No doubt it must be taken that there was, in fact, no claim by the plaintiff against the Honduras Government which could be prosecuted by legal proceedings to a successful issue; but this does not vitiate the contract and destroy the validity of what is alleged as the consideration. The authorities clearly establish that if an agreement is made to compromise a disputed claim, forbearance to sue in respect of that claim is a good consideration; and whether proceedings to enforce the disputed claim have or have not been instituted makes no difference. If the defendant's contention were adopted, it would result that in no case of a doubtful claim could a compromise be enforced. Every day a compromise is effected on the ground that the party making it has a chance of succeeding in it, and if he bonâ fide believes he has a fair chance of success, he has a reasonable ground for suing, and his forbearance to sue will constitute a good consideration. When such a person forbears to sue he gives up what he believes to be a right of action, and the other party gets an advantage, and, instead of being annoyed with an action, he escapes from the vexations incident to it. The defendant's contention is unsupported by authority. It would be another matter if a person made a claim which he knew to be unfounded, and, by a compromise, derived an advantage under it: in that case his conduct would be fraudulent. If the plea had alleged that the plaintiff knew he had no real claim against the Honduras Government, that would have been an answer to the action.

Blackburn J concurred:

I am of the same opinion. The declaration, as it stands, in effect states that the plaintiff, having alleged that certain moneys were due to him from the Honduras Government, was about to enforce payment, and the defendant suggested that the plaintiff's claim, whether good or bad, should stand over. So far, the agreement was a reasonable one. The plea, however, alleges that at the time of making the agreement no money was due. If we are to infer that the plaintiff believed that some money was due to him, his claim was honest, and the compromise of that claim would be binding, and would form a good consideration, although the plaintiff, if he had prosecuted his original claim, would have been defeated. This case is decided by Cook v Wright. In that case it appeared from the evidence that the defendant knew that the original claim of the plaintiff was invalid, yet he was held liable, as the plaintiff believed his claim to be good. The Court say that "the real consideration depends on the reality of the claim made, and the bona fides of the compromise." If the plaintiff's claim against the Honduras Government was not bonâ fide, this ought to have been alleged in the plea; but no such allegation appears.

Lush J and Mellor J stated their concurrence. New Zealand case law, Couch v Branch Investments (1969) Ltd, cites this case.

== See also ==
- English contract law
