= Gerth =

Gerth is a German language surname. It stems from a reduced form of the male given name Gerhardt – and may refer to:

- Bernhard Gerth (1844–1911), German educator and classical philologist
- Federico Gomes Gerth (born 2004), Argentine footballer
- Fritz Gerth (1845–1928), German sculptor
- Jeff Gerth, former investigative reporter for The New York Times
- Sandra Gerth (born 1978), German author of lesbian fiction
