= Raphael Kühner =

German classical philologist

Raphael Kühner (22 March 1802 – 16 April 1878) was a German classical scholar.

He was born in Gotha and educated at the Illustrious Gymnasium and the University of Göttingen.

From 1824 to 1863, Kühner taught classes at the lyceum in Hanover.

He published an edition of the Tusculanae Disputationes of Cicero (1829; fifth edition, 1874). His large Greek grammar, Ausführliche Grammatik der griechischen Sprache (two volumes, 1834–35), was translated into English by William Edward Jelf (1842–45). An enlarged third edition in four volumes was produced by Friedrich Wilhelm Blass and Bernhard Gerth (1890–1904). His large Latin grammar, Ausführliche Grammatik der lateinischen Sprache (two volumes, 1877–79), has been reedited in enlarged form by Friedrich Holzweissig and Carl Stegmann (Hannover, 1912–14). His smaller Greek and Latin grammars passed through many editions.

He died in Hanover.
