= John Charles Day =

The Right Honourable Sir John Day
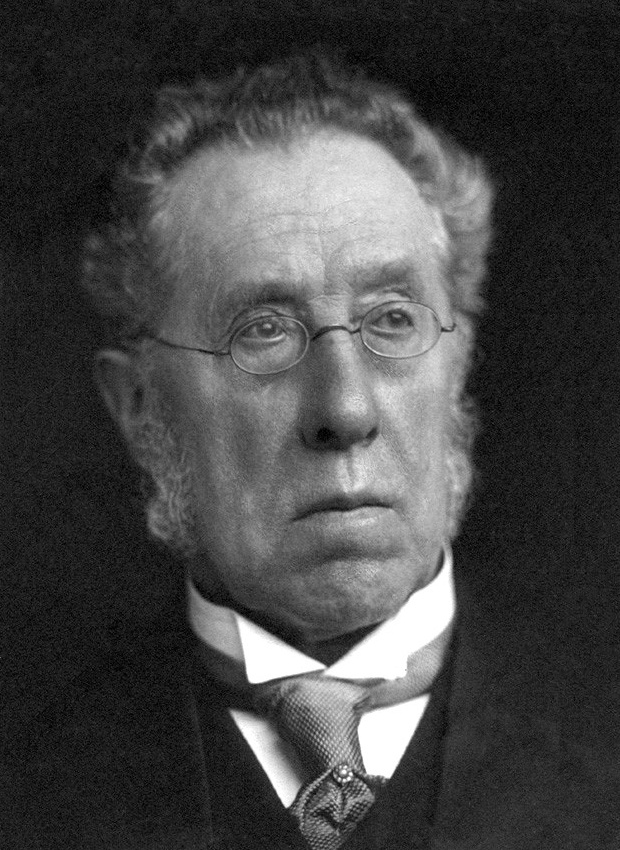
- Sir John Day in 1903

Justice of the High Court
- In office 1882–1901
- Preceded by: Sir Charles Bowen
- Succeeded by: Sir Arthur Jelf

Personal details
- Born: John Charles Frederick Sigismund Day

Sir John Charles Frederick Sigismund Day (20 June 1826 – 13 June 1908) was amongst the first Catholic judges in England to be appointed after the English Reformation, the first being William Shee. He was also known as a collector of paintings, including several works by James McNeill Whistler.

== Biography ==
Born at The Hague, son of Captain John Day and his wife Emilie (née Hartsinck), Day completed his schooling at Downside, and, as the Universities of Oxford and Cambridge were at that time inaccessible to Catholics, obtained his BA from the University of London in November 1845.

He was admitted as a student in the Middle Temple in 1845, was called to the Bar, and became a judge in June 1882. He was well known for sentencing criminals to lashes. In his latter years, he would sometimes listen to cases with his eyes closed, listening intently, and opening an eye suddenly if something significant were said. Colleagues jocularly referred to this as "the peep of Day".

He was one of the judges who sat on the Parnell Commission. At the time it was said that it was on his insistence that early proof was tendered of the authenticity of the letters attributed to Parnell, which forced Richard Pigott into the witness box and led to the collapse of that part of the case.

He resigned from the High Court of Justice in 1901, when he was granted an annuity of £3,500. In March the following year he was appointed to the Privy Council.

There are various portraits of Sir John Day. One of the most notable is a very large painting that is on display in the Royal Courts of Justice in London of several judges including Sir John Day. The National Portrait Gallery houses various cartoons and a photographic portrait of him.

The Times ran an obituary notice on 18 June 1908, and carried an article on the sale of his art collection on 14 May 1909.
