= Friedrich Blass =

German classical scholar (1843–1907)

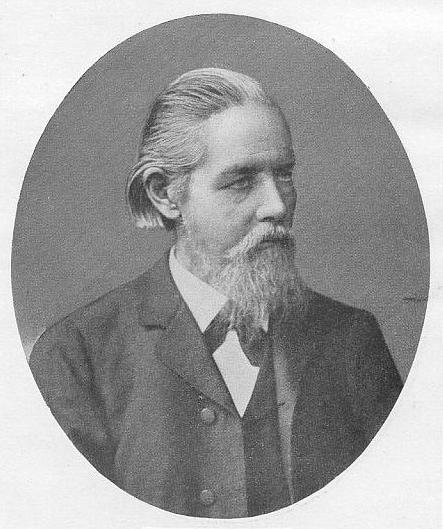
Friedrich Blass

Friedrich Blass (22 January 1843, Osnabrück – 5 March 1907, Halle) was a German classical scholar.

== Biography ==
After studying at Göttingen and Bonn from 1860 to 1863, Blass lectured at several gymnasia and at the University of Königsberg. In 1876 he was appointed extraordinary professor of classical philology at Kiel, and ordinary professor in 1881. In 1892 he accepted a professorship at Halle, where he later died.

He frequently visited England, and was intimately acquainted with leading British scholars. He received an honorary degree from Dublin University in 1892, and his readiness to place the results of his labours at the disposal of others, together with the courtesy and kindliness of his disposition, won the respect of all who knew him.

Blass is chiefly known for his works in connection with the study of Greek oratory: Die Attische Beredsamkeit von Alexander bis auf Augustus (1865); Die attische Beredsamkeit (1868–1880; 2nd ed., 1887–1898), his greatest work; editions for the Teubner series of Andocides (1880), Antiphon (1871, 2nd ed. 1881–1908, also including the surviving orations of Gorgias, Antisthenes, and Alcidamas), Hypereides (1881, 1894), Demosthenes (Dindorf's ed., 1885), Isocrates (1886), Dinarchus (1888), Demosthenes (Rehdantz ed., 1893), Aeschines (1896), Lycurgus, Leocrates (1902); Die Rhythmen der attischen Kunstprosa (1901); Die Rhythmen der asianischen und römischen Kunstprosa (1905). With Bernhard Gerth, he published an enlarged edition of Kühner's Greek grammar, Ausführliche grammatik der griechischen sprache (1890–1904, four volumes).

Among his other works are editions of Eudoxus of Cnidus (1887), the Ἀθηναίων πολιτεία (4th ed., 1903), a work of great importance, and Bacchylides (3rd. ed., 1904); Grammatik des neutestamentlichen Griechisch (1902; Eng. trans. by H St John Thackeray, 1905); Hermeneutik und Kritik and Paläographie, Buchwesen, und Handschriftenkunde (vol. i. of Müller's Handbuch der klassischen Altertumswissenschaft, 1891); Über die Aussprache des Griechischen (1888; Eng. trans. by W. J. Purton, 1890); Die Interpolationen in der Odyssee (1904); contributions to Collitz's Sammlung der griechischen Dialektinschriften; editions of the texts of certain portions of the New Testament (Gospels and Acts). His last work was an edition of the Choephori (1906).

See notices in the Academy, 16 March 1907 (JP Mahaffy); Classical Review, May 1907 (JE Sandys), which contains also a review of Die Rhythmen der asianischen und römischen Kunstprosa.
