= Richard Henry Jelf =

British Army officer (1844–1913)

Colonel Richard Henry Jelf CMG
- Born: 2 February 1844; Oxford
- Died: 13 April 1913 (aged 69); Ashbourne, Derbyshire
- Spouse: Margaret Blunt (m. 1869)
- Military career
- Branch: British Army
- Service years: 1865–1901
- Rank: Colonel
- Unit: Royal Engineers
- Commands: Royal Engineers, Eastern District, 1897–1901
- Conflicts: Bechuanaland Expedition; Second Boer War
- Awards: Order of St Michael and St George

Colonel Richard Henry Jelf CMG (2 February 1844 – 26 April 1913) was a British Army officer and commandant of the Royal Military Academy, Woolwich.

== Early life ==
Jelf was born in Oxford, the third and youngest son of the Reverend Doctor Richard William Jelf (1798-1871), Principal of King's College, London, and canon of Christ Church, Oxford. His older brothers were George Edward Jelf, later canon of Rochester, and lawyer Sir Arthur Richard Jelf.

He was educated at Eton College and King's College, London, before entering the Royal Military Academy in Woolwich.

== Military career ==
Jelf entered the Royal Engineers in 1865. He was promoted to captain in 1878, to Major and Lieutenant-Colonel in 1885, and Colonel in 1889.

He saw service on the Bechuanaland Expedition (1884-1885), as Director of Military Telegraphs (and was honourably mentioned, Brevet Lieutenant-Colonel). He was later chairman of Sanitary Commissioners, Gibraltar (1893-1897; for which he was invested as a Companion of St Michael and St George). He commanded the Royal Engineers, Eastern District, from 1897 to 1901.

He retired in 1901 but was recalled to employment as temporary Major-General in the same year, becoming Governor and Commandant of the Royal Military Academy, Woolwich, a post he retained until 1912. While Commandant, he commissioned the academy's chapel in 1902, an act for which he is commemorated by a brass plaque in the chapel.

He was also a spokesman for the Church of England Soldiers' Institutes Association, and wrote a 1910 biography of his friend Joseph James Curling, a soldier and priest who had also joined the Royal Engineers in 1865. In 1882, Jelf commissioned a bell for St Mary's church in Newfoundland's Bay of Islands, where Curling was priest.

== Family ==
Jelf lived at Ashbourne, Derbyshire, where, in May 1911, he was appointed a Deputy Lieutenant.

With his wife Margaret (nee Blunt, 1839–1921), whom he married on 10 August 1869, he had at least three sons. Wilfrid Jelf and Henry Jelf were both first-class cricketers and military officers. A third son, Richard John Jelf, joined the Royal Engineers and after being invalided home from South Africa shot himself and was buried at sea in June 1900 - a plaque commemorating him and his parents is displayed in Ashbourne's St Oswald's Church.
