= Couch v Branch Investments (1969) Ltd =

Couch v Branch Investments (1969) Limited
- Court: Court of Appeal of New Zealand
- Full case name: Couch v Branch Investments (1969) Limited
- Decided: 19 December 1980
- Citation: [1980] 2 NZLR 314

Court membership
- Judges sitting: Richardson J, Cooke J, McMullin J

Keywords
- forbearance, consideration

Couch v Branch Investments (1969) Limited [1980] 2 NZLR 314 is an often cited case regarding the temporary forbearance of taking legal action on enforcing a debt as being consideration to enter into a new contract with the creditor. It reinforces the English case of Callisher v Bischoffsheim (1870) LR 5 QB 449.

== Background ==
Mr Couch had a company that borrowed $6,000 from Branch Investments on a 3-month loan to purchase a yacht for $4,000, with a further $2,000 to fix it. This transaction was processed as a hire purchase, which was a sham, due to the fact that Branch Investments were not in the business of selling yachts, for which he personally guaranteed the debt. 20 days into the loan, the boat subsequently sunk and was a total loss. Couch later got into financial difficulties, and defaulted on an instalment, and as a result came to an agreement with Branch Investments that they would not sue for the missed payment in return for Mr Couch to agree to pay the debt of $6,500, that his wife agrees to be liable for the debt as well, plus pay 10% interest, as well as grant mortgages over 2 properties that they owned as security for the new debt.

Things then went from bad to worse, with another instalment being missed, and the creditor tried to enforce the new forbearance agreement, which was far more beneficial to the creditor than the previous hire purchase agreement.

Even more so as the debtor later discovered, when he realised that the original hire purchase agreement was illegal and not legally enforceable. As the original contract was not legally enforceable, Couch also refused to pay under the forbearance agreement on the basis that as there was no legally enforceable agreement to sue in the first place, meant that forbearing to sue under that contract was not consideration for entering into the subsequent forbearance agreement.

Branch took the position that at the time they had an honest belief that had they sued at the time, that they had a reasonable belief that their claim would succeed.

== Decision ==
In a 2:1 majority ruling, the Court of Appeal of New Zealand ruled that the forbearance agreement was legally enforceable on the grounds of public policy; people should be able to compromise bona fide claims even if they had little hope of success, although it would come down to an "honest belief". If it was later discovered that the creditor withheld evidence or made misleading statements during the legal proceedings, this would likely complicate the matter.

Richardson J said

If the primary rule is that there is sufficient consideration where the party suing on the compromise or the forbearance honestly believed that he had a good or at least an arguable cause of action which he had genuinely intended to pursue, once that factual issue is decided affirmatively the merits of the original claim are no longer material.
