= John Louis Petit =

British clergyman & artist (1801–1868)

John Louis Petit (also known as The Reverend John Louis Petit; 31 May 1801 – 1 December 1868) was an artist and architectural historian whose paintings of buildings and landscapes, almost exclusively in watercolour, complemented his activities as one of the mid-19th-century's leading writers and speakers on ecclesiastical architecture. He was a vocal opponent of the dominant architectural orthodoxies of the Gothic Revival.

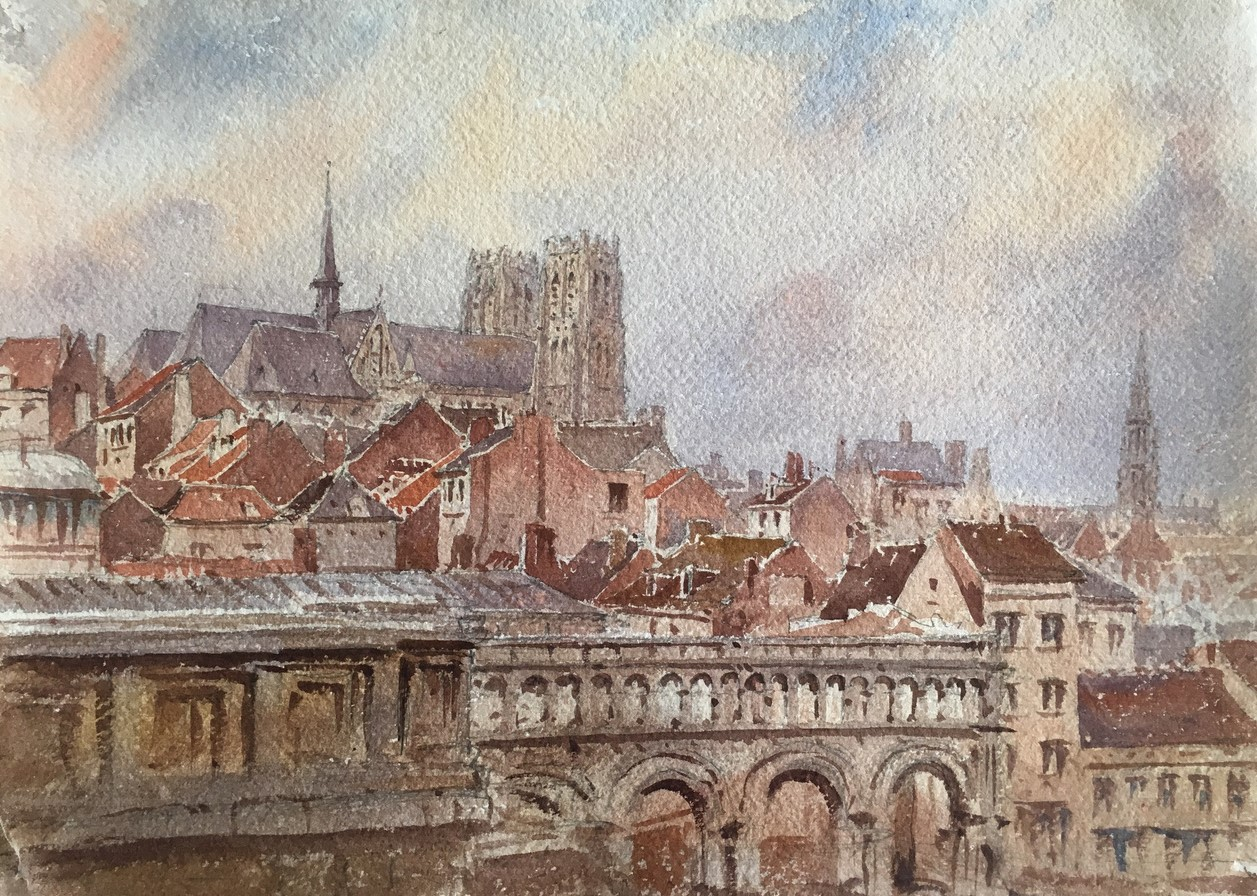
Brussels Cathedral and town, watercolour, 24x36 cm, 1855

During extensive travels both at home and in continental Europe (as well as the Middle East), Petit painted buildings of different periods and styles with a focus on medieval architecture. His subject matter included landscapes, modern urban views, utilitarian structures such as bridges and factories, and Classical ruins. His paintings were completed on the spot, and are frequently marked by a sketch-like immediacy that places his work outside the mainstream of 19th-century picturesque travel views, calling to mind some aspects of Pre-Impressionism. In numerous watercolours of ecclesiastical buildings, he conveyed the visual and emotional impact of churches and cathedrals individually and in their settings. Displays of his watercolours at his talks, sometimes a hundred at a time, contributed to his popularity as a speaker.

Born into a family of French Huguenot origins, he was ordained into the Church of England in his mid-twenties, but ceased parochial work a few years later. He never painted for money, and after his death his art disappeared from public view and was largely forgotten, although the impact of his architectural writings lingered into the following century. A huge cache of his work was held by descendants until the 1980s when it was sold, mainly in regional auctions, in large lots mixed with poorer work by his sisters.

Renewed interest in Petit since 2016 has led to the publication of a number of books and articles, the founding of the Rev. J.L. Petit Society to promote awareness of his artistic and architectural legacy, and the installation of information boards in Lichfield where Petit lived and is buried. The chapel he designed, St Philip's Church, Caerdeon, in northwest Wales, was upgraded to Grade I listing in 2018.

== Family background and early life ==
Petit, the eldest of 10 children of The Reverend John Hayes Petit and Harriet Astley, was born in Ashton-under-Lyne, Lancashire into a well established and prosperous Huguenot family, originally from Caen in Normandy, where the family name had been Petit des Etans. Petit's great-great-grandfather, Louis Petit (died 1720), had fled to England after the 1685 Revocation of the Edict of Nantes, attaining the rank of brigadier-general in the British Army. Petit's grandfather was the physician and Fellow of the Royal Society, John Lewis Petit (1736–80), and his uncle was the barrister and politician, Louis Hayes Petit (1774-1849). Petit's mother was the daughter of the English portrait painter and amateur architect, John Astley (1724-1787).

Petit married Louisa Elizabeth Reid in Ashford, Kent, in 1828, but they never had children. His two brothers also died childless as did four of his seven sisters. His father had been the incumbent at Shareshill parish north of Wolverhampton, and they lived in Lichfield where Petit was brought up and where he would live himself for most of his life.

Petit was educated at Eton College and Trinity College, Cambridge, where he was awarded a BA in 1823 and graduated MA in 1826. He was ordained as deacon in 1825 and priest a year later. He worked as assistant curate and then stipendiary curate at St Michael's, Lichfield, until 1828, after which he was curate at the twin parish of Bradfield and Mistley in Essex until resigning in 1834.

== Artistic development and painting style ==
Petit's artistic style divides into two main periods, though with considerable variety and experimentation in both. Most of Petit's early work is set in Britain, and especially in or around Staffordshire, his home county, or Essex and Kent. Petit worked as a curate from 1828 to 1834 at Bradfield, Essex, before quitting full-time work to focus on his art and architectural interests. In the 1830s he also made three or four trips to Europe in preparation for his first book.

From the mid-1820s, to which the earliest of his work can be dated, until the early 1840s his watercolours tended to be more carefully completed, and smaller in size, than was the case later. This period includes landscapes and shipping, as well as more unusual subjects such as factories and mines in Wolverhampton. Petit visited the Isle of Man several times, especially in the early 1840s, and is known to have painted over 30 Island pictures.

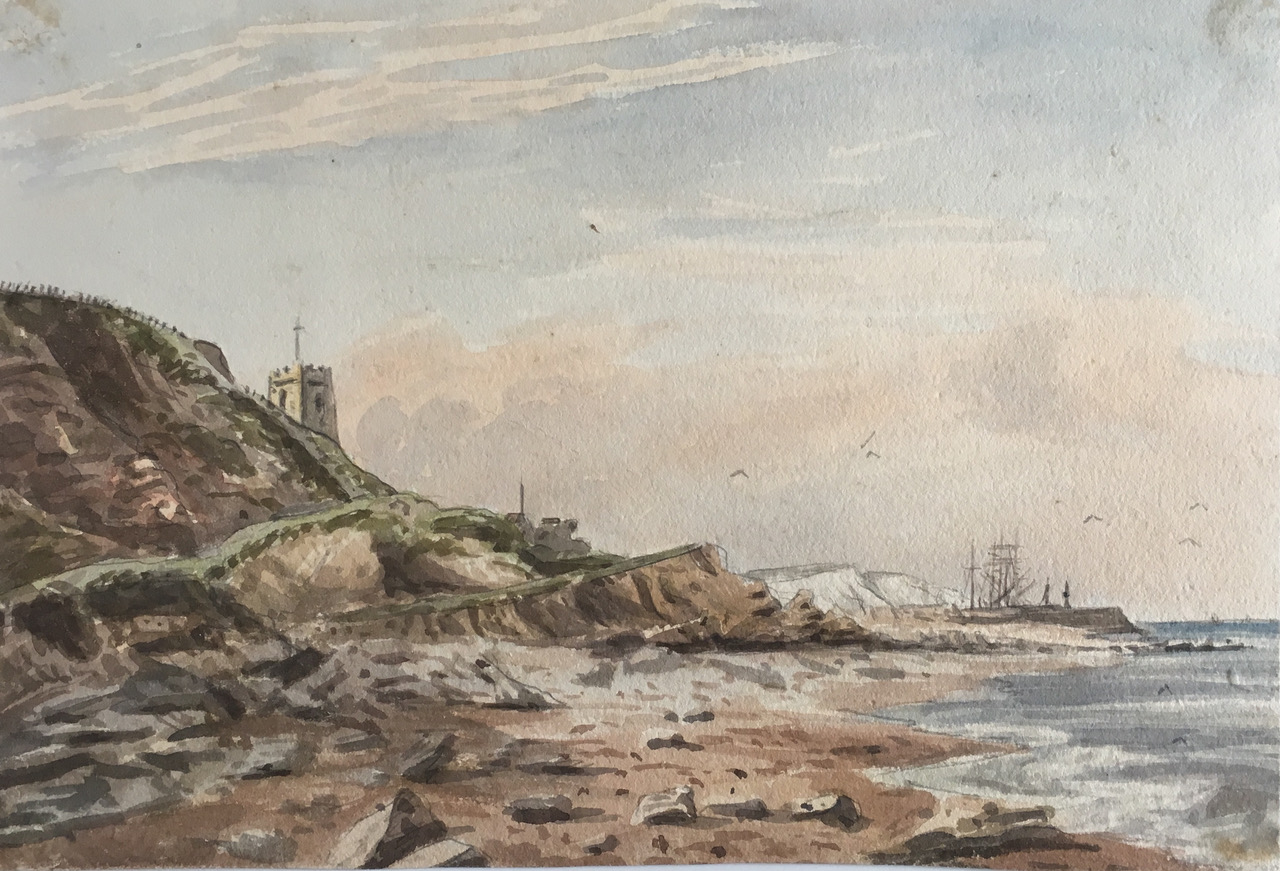
Folkestone, Kent, 18x24 cm, 1828.

In later years, especially the 1850s and 1860s, most of Petit's work was undertaken abroad. He travelled often, especially in France (where he sketched most years), Germany, Italy, and Ireland, but also completing tours to Corfu, Greece and Constantinople (1857), Spain and North Africa (1858) and Egypt and Syria (1865). In this latter period, Petit produced architectural sketches to support his speaking and writing, and little of his work was executed with a high degree of finish.

The underlying tone of this later work is reddish, sometimes almost monochromatically so. As well as being the colour of brickwork, it may have been deliberately intended to make his watercolours visually distinctive for exhibiting in quantity at his lectures. The best of these examples were not mere transcriptions of architecture, but conveyed the effect of buildings in their surroundings: the dignity of the rural church or the awe-inspiring cathedral in its setting.

More and more, Petit eschewed precise or delicate work, conveying visual impact, emotion and effect impressionistically and dramatically. About one-third of Petit's later works were landscapes - sometimes showing a distant church dwarfed by the vastness of nature, frequently focusing on individual trees, and at other times depicting valleys, mountains, hillsides and even individual rocks.

== The topographical tradition ==
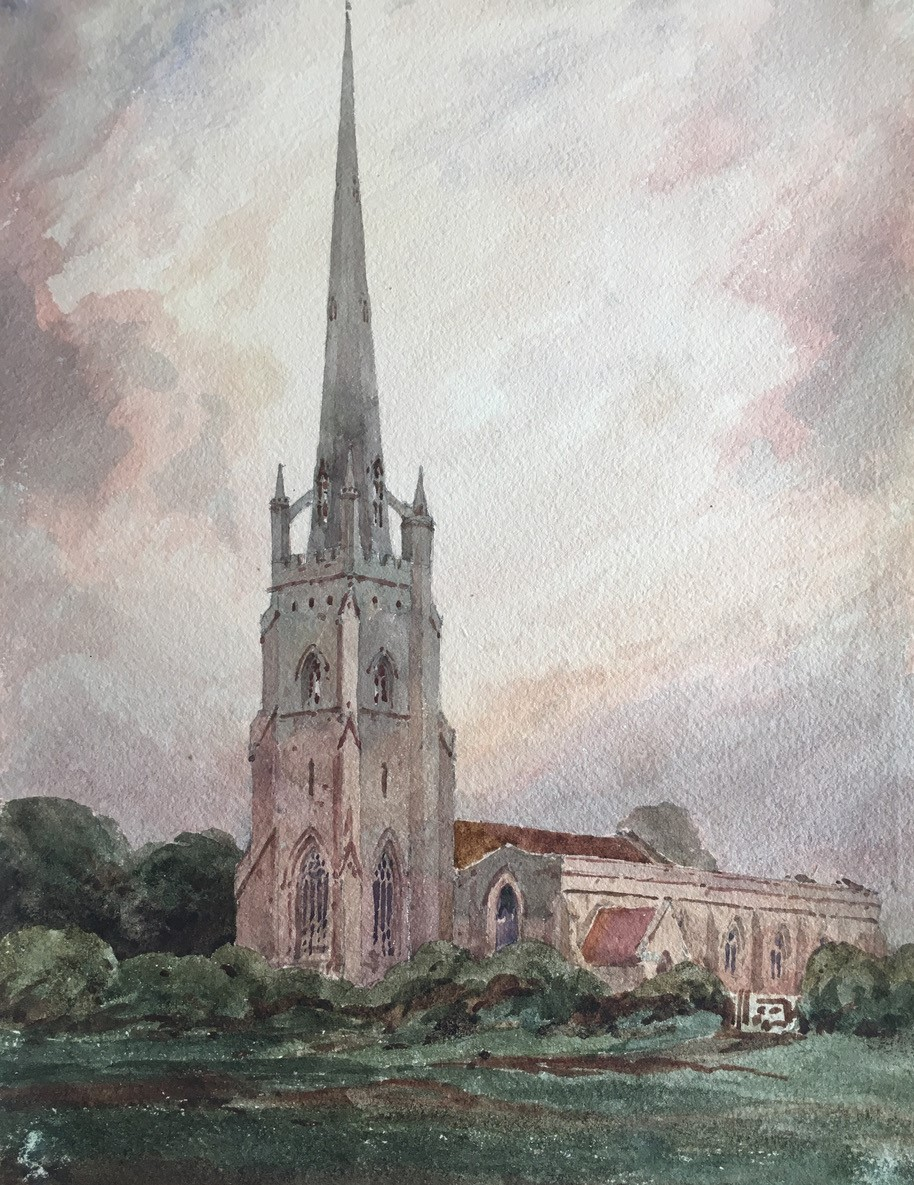
Clifton Campville, Staffordshire, watercolour, 34x23 cm, 1845

Petit holds a particular place in the British topographical tradition. In both the 18th and 19th centuries artists were regularly commissioned to provide drawings of particular places (for owners of country seats, Grand Tourists, collectors, or publishers of "picturesque" views or reports of antiquarian expeditions).

Whereas these started out as predominantly documentary records of specific buildings or places, subsequently professional artists began to add the ingredients of poetic idealisation, contrived rusticity and Romantic sentiment to the mix, and by the 19th century an increasingly conventionalised style of topographical drawing was prevalent.

Petit unites these two traditions. That he systematically inscribed the name of locations (initially on album pages, then on the versos of his paintings - and from 1854 onwards the date too) emphasises the "topographical" focus of his art. Self-effacingly, he never signed his work - as if to play down his own role as an artistic interpreter of a given scene rather than its impartial transcriber.

Completing approximately 12,000-15,000 watercolours, he was a faithful recorder of architecture, urban environments and natural scenery, but at the same time he succeeded in conveying the emotional impact of the buildings and scenes he portrayed. "As we can understand from the long poem he wrote at the end of his life, The Lesser and the Greater Light, Petit painted to convey the spiritual beauty of nature and the precious beauty of medieval churches at risk from thoughtless restoration. Working neither for the commercial market nor for patrons, he painted to express his beliefs, his love of nature and to help explain his opposition to the dogmas of the Gothic Revival."

== Artistic legacy ==
After Petit's death, the Architectural Exhibition Society gave over part of its annual show to an exhibition of around 300 of his watercolours, after which they disappeared. Petit left 1,000 of his drawings to different family members, and the rest (the vast bulk) passed down one family line until 1957 when they were abandoned to new owners after a death. The collection, already depleted by damage, was then disposed of mainly through auctioneers Sotheby's Billingshurst in the 1980s and 1990s with little or no attempt at a systematic understanding of Petit's worth as an artist.

Only since 2016 have research and conservation in relation to Petit's artistic legacy been undertaken and a number of books and articles published. So far remnants of two-thirds of his albums and folios have been identified. Up to one-third, mostly later works, including many from his more distant travels, may have been lost.

A complicating factor is that Petit's sister Emma, and often other family members, travelled and painted with him. Their watercolours, similar in subject matter to Petit's but weaker artistically, were mixed with his in the disposal of his work. Because, like Petit himself, they rarely signed their pictures, this has led to confusion and further undermined Petit's reputation.

The art critic Andrew Graham-Dixon considers Petit "an artist whose work, particularly in the medium of watercolour, reaches the highest peaks of innovation and virtuosity, worthy of comparison with that even of Turner".

== Petit's circle ==
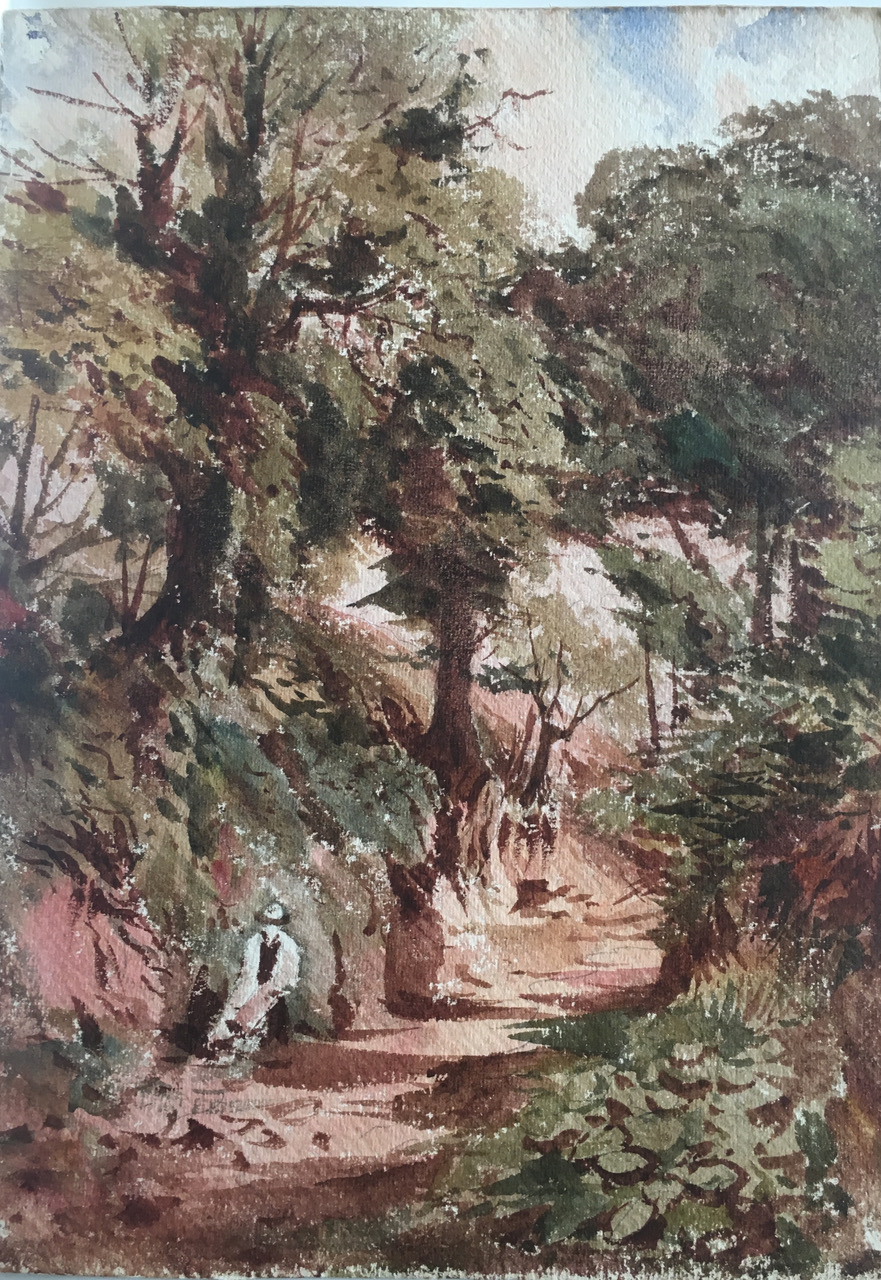
Near Bumblekyte, watercolour, 37x26 cm, 1867

Petit's fourth sister, Emma Gentille Petit, accompanied him most frequently on painting tours from about 1845, and occasionally contributed drawings for his articles, something that he always acknowledged. She also appears to have been the one cataloguing and organising his albums and folios.

His other sisters Elizabeth (Haig), Susannah and Maria (Jelf), and his sister-in-law, Amelia Reid, and Sarah Salt, his niece, also painted alongside Petit on different occasions. His wife Louisa (Reid) is believed to have painted still lifes and birds, but seems not to have been interested in architecture.

In total some 10%-20% of works sold as Petit's through Sotheby's Billingshurst are believed to be by these family members and of these a large proportion by Emma. Emma, Elizabeth and Susannah lived with Petit and looked after the pictures until their deaths in the 1890s, whence they went to a son of Maria Jelf.

Petit was a close friend and collaborator of Philip Delamotte, who became Professor of Art at King's College, London. Delamotte was one of the leading proponents of photography as it emerged in the UK, and recognised as one of the leading teachers of watercolour art and photography.

Delamotte travelled with Petit on several occasions, contributing drawings to Petit's Architectural Studies in France (1854, reprinted 1870) and occasional illustrations to his articles. In Delamotte's book, The Art of Sketching from Nature (1871), he included Petit alongside the work of a roll call of 10 of the great professionals of the age including Turner, Prout and Birket Foster.

== Writings and architectural controversies ==
Petit's first book, Remarks on Church Architecture, appeared in 1841. A tour de force in two volumes, with over 300 illustrations from watercolours by Petit himself, it sought to gather multiple examples to demonstrate the range of beauty in all historical architectural styles, from the continent as well as Britain. The underlying purpose was to counter the dogma of one "correct" style set out in Augustus Welby Northmore Pugin's Contrasts, which had appeared a few years earlier.

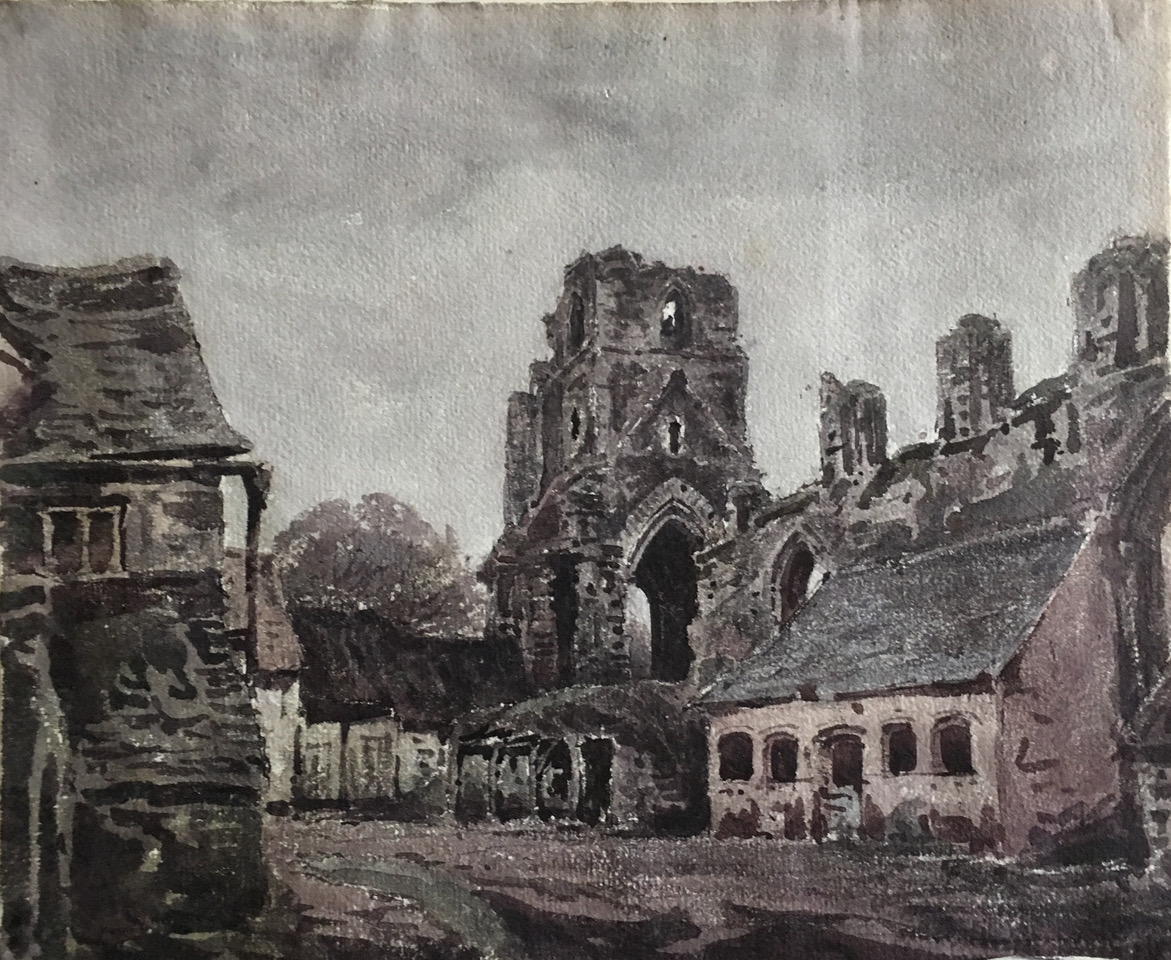
Ulverscroft Priory, Leicestershire, watercolour, 24x33 cm, 1830s

Remarks on Church Architecture was widely praised in many quarters, but faced harsh criticism from the followers of Pugin, grouped around the Cambridge Camden Society and their recently founded journal, The Ecclesiologist. This battle continued for the rest of Petit's life. Petit published over 25 articles, delivered at least as many speeches, and authored five volumes of individual speeches and one other major book, Architectural Studies in France. The themes and objectives of his publishing and speaking were consistent: countering approaches to restoration that sought to alter medieval church buildings; calling for originality in new buildings; and the belief that contemporary architects should be able to draw on all available historical styles from both the British Isles and overseas.

"But alas for the building which falls into the hands of an ignorant or presumptuous restorer! [...] How many a noble church, that for ages has preserved its beauty in spite of accident, violence, or decay, seems to writhe and struggle under the fantastic additions and incongruous ornaments of some architect who fancies he can supply what its original designer has omitted, or correct what he has planned!"

So lamented Petit in a chapter of Remarks on Church Architecture titled "On Modern Repairs and Adaptations".

Petit's advocacy of careful preservation and non-intrusive restoration of medieval buildings came a generation in advance of the founding of the Society for the Protection of Ancient Buildings (SPAB) in 1877, and on this point he and the antiquarians, archaeologists and architects who supported his position were eventually successful, although only after much intrusive restoration had been done.

An early battle in the early 1840s with a young George Gilbert Scott concerning St Mary's], the main church in Stafford, was lost, and many other restorations added neo-Gothic features to old churches.

Gradually the tide turned, however. The Cambridge Camden Society (known as the Ecclesiological Society from 1845) tempered its more uncompromising architectural doctrines, and Scott himself came to champion "faithful" restoration of ancient churches.

Petit's advocacy of foreign models quickly gained wide acceptance, although when he argued at a RIBA talk in 1858 that even Byzantine architecture had much to offer he had to admit to sometimes being accused of indiscriminately advocating the style of the country he had most recently visited.

Petit demonstrated what he meant in practice on only two occasions: when he drew up the architectural designs for his house outside Lichfield and a chapel at Caerdeon, north-west Wales (see below).

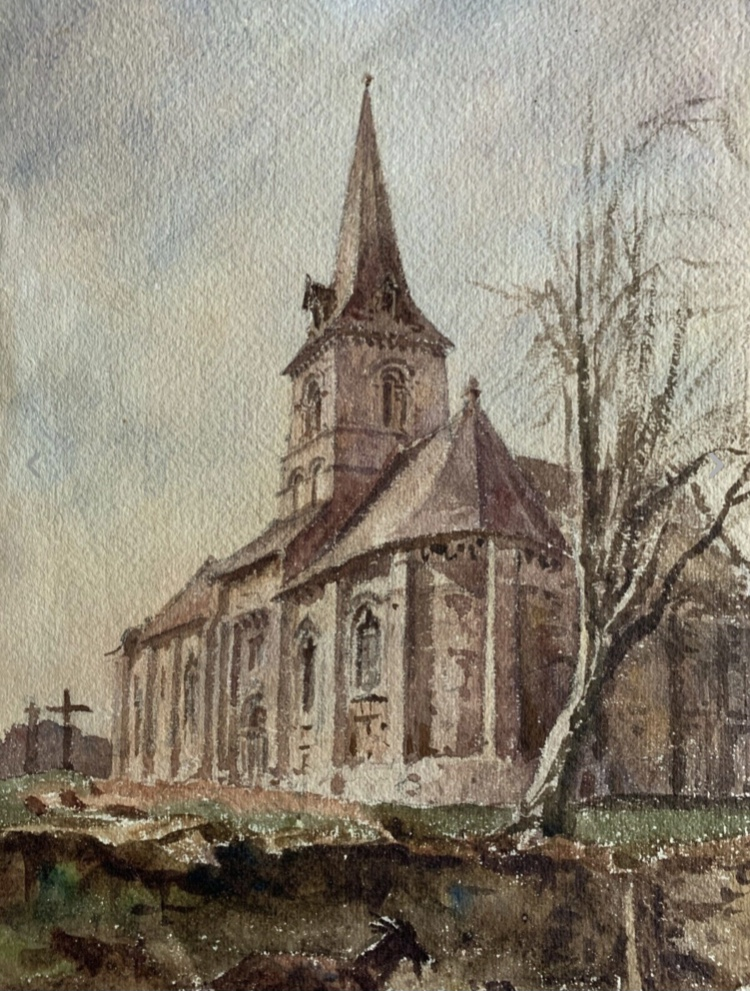
Church of Saint-Loup, Normandy, watercolour by Petit, 1854

While there were many advocates on both sides - the Gothic Revivalists and the "anti-Gothic party" - the Gothicists were ultimately more influential in writing the history of the period, and the mid-19th Century came to be known as the age of the Gothic Revival. The strivings of the opposition camp, especially Petit, have been downplayed despite their important counterbalancing role at the time.

== Petit as architect ==
Petit designed two buildings: his own house at Upper Longdon, outside Lichfield, built in 1855; and St Philip's Church, Caerdeon for his brother-in-law, The Reverend William Edward Jelf, erected in 1861-2.

He also influenced designs for other buildings, as well as providing indirect inspiration for other architects. He contributed to some alterations in St Paul's Cathedral as one of its few defenders at a time when the prevailing fashion was for neo-Gothic.

The Chapel at Caerdeon, subsequently named St Philip's, still stands and in 2018 received Grade I listing. The house at Upper Longdon ("Bumblekyte") was sold by his sisters in the 1890s, and was later demolished. The designs for both were exhibited at Architectural Exhibition Society annual shows.

The chapel was criticised by Petit's detractors for not having the required Gothic components and resembling "something between a large lodge gate and a lady's rustic dairy".

== Membership of learned societies and institutions ==
Petit was elected a Fellow of the Society of Antiquaries, admitted ad eundem to Oxford on 21 June 1850, was a founder member of the Archaeological Institute, where he published most frequently, and the Institute of British Architects, as well as holding several regional society positions such as Secretary of the Lichfield Diocesan Architectural Society.

== Collections ==
The National Library of Wales has nearly 200 works as part of the Ian and Eileen Cooke Bequest Collection (awaiting cataloguing), as well as 59 watercolours mainly related to the building of the Chapel at Caerdeon, the only church which Petit designed (in 1861-2).

The Staffordshire Museum Service Art Collection and William Salt Library hold 27 of his works.

The Victoria and Albert Museum in London has an album of the illustrations used in his first book, and two additional watercolours.

Southampton University has a set of 151 watercolours removed from an album, mainly of South Coast views, dating from ca. 1840.
