= Jelfs =

Jelfs is a surname. Notable people with the surname include:

- Kim Jelfs (fl. 2010), computational chemist
- Lizzie Jelfs (born 1976), British tennis player
- Paul Jelfs (born 1953), Australian rugby union and rugby league player

== See also ==
- Jelf
