= Montague Lush =

The Right Honourable Sir Montague Lush
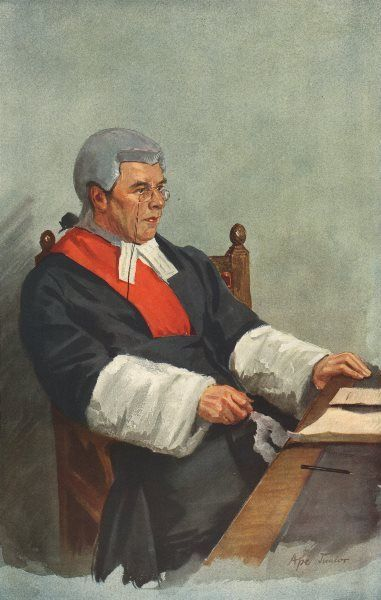

Justice of the High Court
- In office 6 October 1910 – 20 May 1925
- Preceded by: Sir Arthur Jelf

Personal details
- Born: Charles Montague Lush; 7 December 1853 Hampstead, Middlesex, England
- Died: 22 June 1930 (aged 76) Stanmore, Middlesex
- Spouse: Jane Smith (m. 1893; died 1925)
- Relations: Sir Robert Lush (father)
- Children: 6
- Education: Westminster School; Trinity Hall, Cambridge

Sir Charles Montague Lush (7 December 1853 – 22 June 1930) was a British barrister and judge.

== Biography ==
The son of the judge Sir Robert Lush, Lush was educated at Westminster School and at Trinity Hall, Cambridge, where he took a First in Classics in 1876. He was called to the bar by Gray's Inn in 1879, and joined the North Eastern Circuit. He took silk in 1902.

In 1910, Lush was appointed to the High Court and assigned to the King's Bench Division, receiving the customary knighthood on 13 October 1910. In 1915 he was appointed as President of the Railway and Canal Commission. He retired from the bench in 1925 due to deafness, and was sworn of the Privy Council the same year, although he never sat on the Judicial Committee of the Privy Council.

Although highly regarded as a barrister, he was not a successful judge: he was said to be too diffident and sometimes let personal feelings influence his decisions.

== Arms ==
Coat of arms of Montague Lush
Crest A naked arm couped below the elbow grasping in the hand a crescent Argent. Escutcheon Gules a chevron Ermine between three garbs Or. Motto Virtute Non Astutia
