= St Philip's Church, Caerdeon =

Coordinates: 52.744°N 3.9994°W

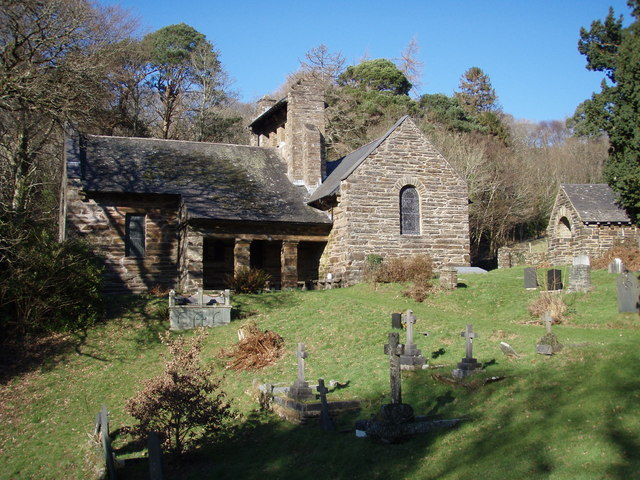

- Location in Gwynedd
- OS grid reference: SH 651 181
- Location: Caerdeon, Gwynedd
- Country: Wales
- Denomination: Church in Wales
- Website: Friends of Friendless Churches

Architecture
- Functional status: Redundant
- Heritage designation: Grade I
- Designated: 9 November 1992
- Architect: John Louis Petit
- Architectural type: Church

Specifications
- Materials: Stone, slate roof

St Philip's Church, Caerdeon, near Barmouth, in Gwynedd, North Wales, is a redundant church and a Grade I listed building in the care of the Friends of Friendless Churches.

The church was built in 1862 for the Rev. William Edward Jelf, a High church clergyman and senior censor at Christ Church, Oxford. It was designed by his brother-in-law, John Louis Petit. Petit was a noted architectural critic and artist, but St Philip's is one of only two buildings known to be by him. Jelf wanted a church on his newly acquired estate where his Oxford seminarians could worship in the English language. This led to a considerable controversy as there was an existing legal obligation to hold services in Welsh in all churches in Welsh-speaking areas. Jelf lost his case in the Court of Arches but was supported by the Bishop of Bangor who used his influence and position in the House of Lords to secure the passing of the English Services in Wales Act 1863 (26 & 27 Vict. c. 82), which allowed for English-language services in certain circumstances.

== History ==
William Edward Jelf (1811–1875) was a Classical scholar, clergyman and senior censor at Christ Church, Oxford. His entry in the Dictionary of National Biography records that "faults of temper and manner rendered him unpopular", and much of his life was devoted to pursuing a large number of liturgical and ecclesiological controversies. In the 1850s, Jelf purchased the Caerdeon estate and commissioned a church to the designs of his brother-in-law, John Louis Petit. Petit, an artist and architectural critic, was himself a magnet for controversy, spending much of his life in opposition to the prevailing tenets of Gothic Revival architecture advanced by Augustus Pugin. (Note: Petit's biographer, Philip Modiano, has called Petit "the leading opponent of the Gothic Revival".)

The construction and operation of St Philip's embroiled both men in further, bitter argument. Jelf was determined that services in his church would be conducted in English, as few if any of his intended congregation of Oxford seminarians could speak Welsh. His intention ran counter to the prevailing legal position, which required that services be conducted in Welsh in all areas where the Welsh language predominated. The Rector of Llanaber took Jelf to the Court of Arches, where Jelf lost his case, but his supporter, James Colquhoun Campbell, Bishop of Bangor, used his position in and influence over the House of Lords to secure the passing of the Church Services (Wales) Act 1863 (26 & 27 Vict. c. 82), which allowed the conduct of services in English in certain circumstances. This included situations where the church in question was a private chapel, an exemption which applied to St Philip's. The church was consecrated in 1875.

St Philip's continued in use through the 20th century. In that time, the explorer Bill Tilman worshipped at the church and rang the bells for many years. The Church in Wales declared St Philip's redundant in 2014 and it came into the care of the Friends of Friendless Churches in 2021. The Friends have been undertaking a major programme of fundraising and restoration since their acquisition.

== Architecture and description ==
The architecture of St Philip's is unusual for its time and location. In addition to arguing for a sensitive approach to restoration and against the prevailing currents of the Gothic Revival, Petit, an experienced traveller, contended for the use of European sources. St Philip's, his only church and one of only two buildings known to have been designed by him, (Note: Petit's only other known building, aside from St Philip's, is a house he designed for himself in Upper Longdon, outside Lichfield. Called "Bumblekyte", it was demolished in 1969.) has been described variously as "rustic Mediterranean, Alpine, of French Basque influence or like an Italian farm building". The east window, with a crucifixion in stained glass by Charles Eamer Kempe, was inserted in 1892 in memory of Samuel Holland who purchased the Caerdeon estate in 1875.

The church is built of local rubble stone and slate. Entry is through a loggia. The bellcote contains four bells, a mechanism allows for all the bells to be rung by one person using a single bell pull. Originally a Grade II* listed building, its status was upgraded to Grade I in 2018. The lychgate is listed at Grade II; it was erected in 1927 in memory of Catherine Jane Holland, the widow of Samuel Holland.

== Sources ==
- Greenhill, William Alexander (1892). "Jelf, William Edward" . Dictionary of National Biography. Vol. 29. pp. 291–292.
