= Richard William Jelf =

British academic (1798–1871)

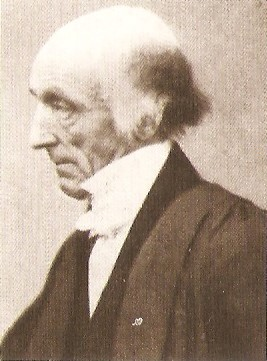
Richard William Jelf

Richard William Jelf (25 January 1798 – 19 September 1871) was the fourth Principal of King's College, London.

He was educated at Eton College and Christ Church, Oxford, and was subsequently made a Fellow of Oriel College, Oxford. He served as canon of Christ Church, Oxford, and Principal of King's College, London, from 1844 to 1868.

== Early life ==
He was the second son of Sir James Jelf, of Gloucester, and brother of William Edward Jelf. He was educated at Eton, where he began a lifelong friendship with Edward Bouverie Pusey, and in December 1816 matriculated at Christ Church, Oxford, where he graduated B.A. (with a second class in classics) in 1820, and M.A. in 1823, B.D. 1831, D.D. 1839.

== Career ==
In 1820 he was elected fellow of Oriel College, took holy orders in 1821, and became one of the tutors in 1823 after receiving his M.A. Jelf was master of the schools in 1824, and classical examiner in 1825.

After being for a short time private tutor to Sir George Nugent, Jelf was in 1826 appointed preceptor to Prince George of Cumberland. This post he filled for thirteen years, residing much at Berlin before his pupil's father became king of Hanover (in 1837). In 1830 he was appointed canon of Christ Church, as well as married. Jelf never was prominent Tractarian, but both John Henry Newman and his friend Pusey addressed to him their letters on the interpretation of the Thirty-nine Articles, advocated in Tract 90 of the Tracts for the Times, in 1841. In 1842 he preached a sermon before the university, published as Via Media; or the Church of England our providential path between Romanism and Dissent. In 1847 he was appointed one of the six doctors to examine and report on Pusey's sermon, with the result that Pusey was suspended from preaching for two years.

In 1844 Jelf succeeded Bishop John Lonsdale as principal of King's College, London, which had been founded in 1829 as in response to the theological controversies surrounding the secular University of London in 1826. There Jelf remained for twenty-four years, founding the theological department. When F. D. Maurice, the professor of theology, published his Theological Essays in 1853, Jelf condemned his views, and the council deprived Maurice of his professorship, although Maurice would be unanimously elected the Knightbridge professorship at Cambridge in 1866. Jelf also served as proctor in convocation for the chapter of Christ Church, and also sub-almoner to the queen.

After resigning in 1868 the principalship of King's College, Jelf lived in the house attached to his canonry at Oxford, where he died on 19 September 1871.

== Works ==
Jelf preached the Bampton lectures at Oxford in 1844, his subject being An Inquiry into the means of Grace, their mutual connection and combined use, with especial reference to the Church of England. He published a volume of Sermons Doctrinal and Practical, London, 1835; and Suggestions respecting the Neglect of the Hebrew Language as a qualification for Holy Orders, London, 1832. He also edited Bishop John Jewel's Works, Oxford, 1848, 8 vols., and left behind him a series of Lectures on the Thirty-nine Articles, which were edited after his death, 1873, by his son-in-law, the Rev. J. R. King.

== Legacy ==
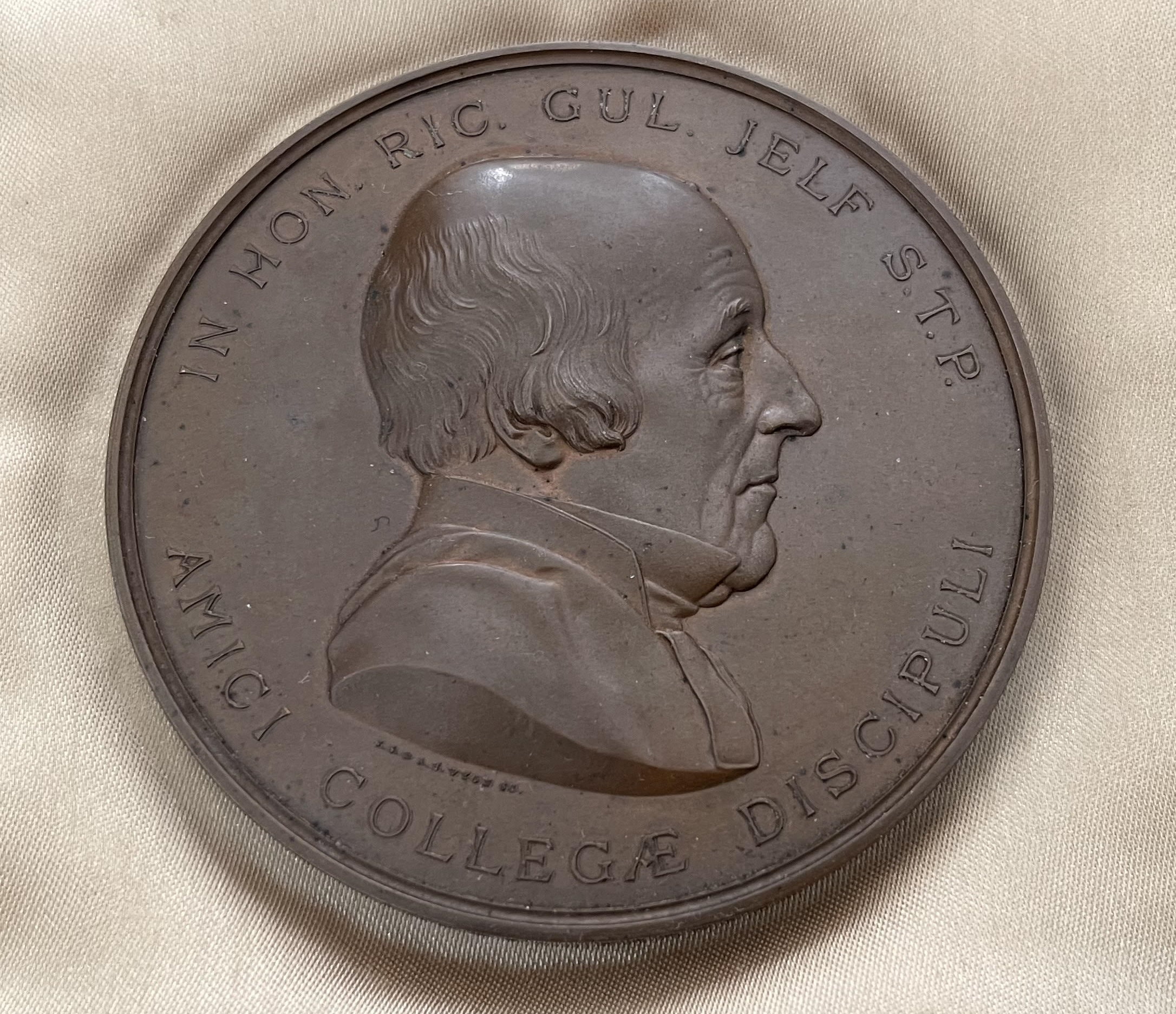
A Jelf Medal from the 1930s

The Jelf Medal was established at King's College London in his memory; it is awarded to the student who, in the view of the Principal, has most distinguished him or herself during their undergraduate career at the College.

== Family ==
Jelf married in 1830 Emmy, countess Schlippenbach, lady-in-waiting to the Duchess of Cumberland; he had seven children, including George Edward Jelf, canon of Rochester, Sir Arthur Richard Jelf, and Colonel Richard Henry Jelf. His grandsons were Wilfrid Jelf and Henry Jelf, both first-class cricketers and military officers.

Academic offices
Preceded by John Lonsdale	Principal of King's College, London; 1843–1868	Succeeded by Alfred Barry
