= Robert Lush =

English judge (1807–1881)

The Right Honourable Sir Robert Lush
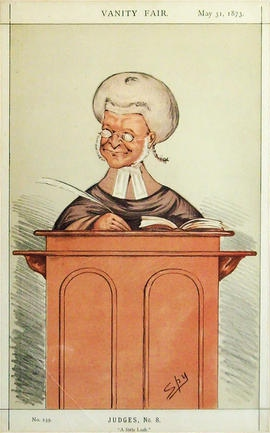
- "A little lush" Lush as caricatured by Spy (Leslie Ward) in Vanity Fair, May 1873

Sir Robert Lush (25 October 1807 – 27 December 1881) was an English judge who served on many Commissions and Committees of Judges.

== Biography ==
Born at Shaftesbury, he was educated at Gray's Inn before being called to the Bar in 1840. He earned a reputation as a sound and acute barrister, specially familiar with procedure. He was appointed QC in 1857, and was immediately elected a Bencher of Gray's Inn. He became a Justice of the Queen's Bench and was knighted in 1865; he was sworn a member of the Privy Council in 1879. He was a life-long baptist.

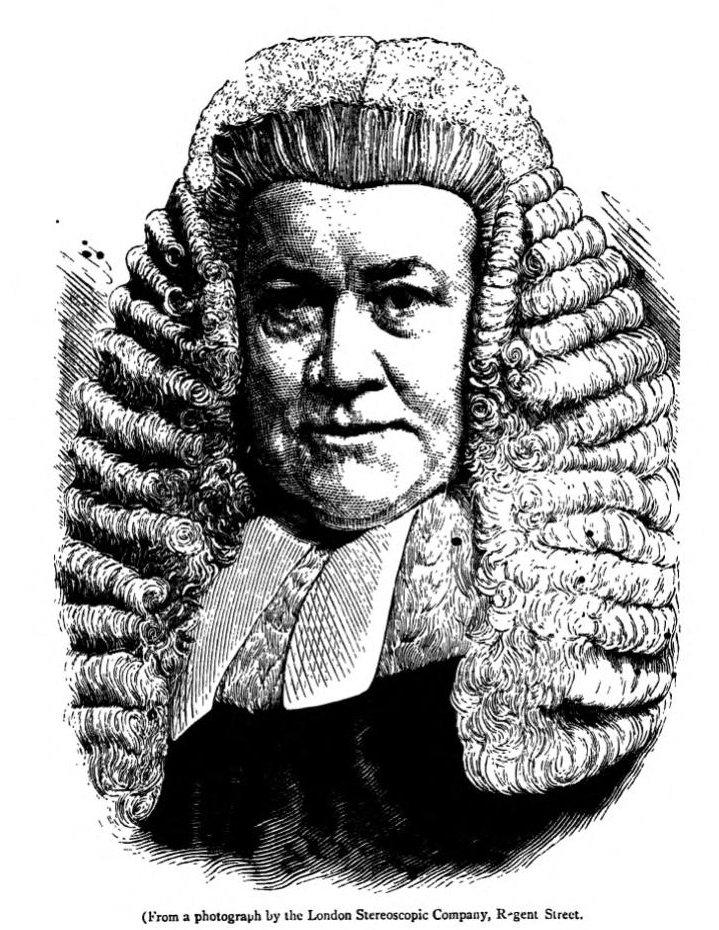

== Personal life ==
He married in 1839, Elizabeth Ann (died 16 March 1881), the eldest daughter of Rev Christopher Woollacott, of London. They had several children, including Judge Herbert W. Lush-Wilson, KC, and Sir Charles Montague Lush (1853–1930), who married Margaret Abbie Locock, fourth daughter of Charles Brodie Locock; in 1913 he sentenced Emmeline Pankhurst.

== Arms ==
Coat of arms of Robert Lush
Crest A naked arm couped below the elbow grasping in the hand a crescent Argent. Escutcheon Gules a chevron Ermine between three garbs Or. Motto Virtute Non Astutia

== External sources ==
- Hamilton, John (1893). "Lush, Robert" . In Lee, Sidney (ed.). Dictionary of National Biography. Vol. 34. London: Smith, Elder & Co. pp. 289–290.
