= Bernhard Gerth =

Friedrich Bernhard Gerth
- Born: April 5, 1844; Dresden
- Died: February 1, 1911 (aged 66); Leipzig
- Occupations: Educator, classical philologist, gymnasium rector

Academic background
- Education: University of Leipzig

Academic work
- Discipline: Classical philology

Friedrich Bernhard Gerth (5 April 1844, Dresden – 1 February 1911, Leipzig) was a German educator and classical philologist.

In 1868 he received his PhD from the University of Leipzig with a dissertation on the dialects of Greek tragedy, titled "Quaestiones de Graecae Tragoediae dialecto". Later on, he served as a rector at gymnasiums in Zwickau and Leipzig (from 1901).

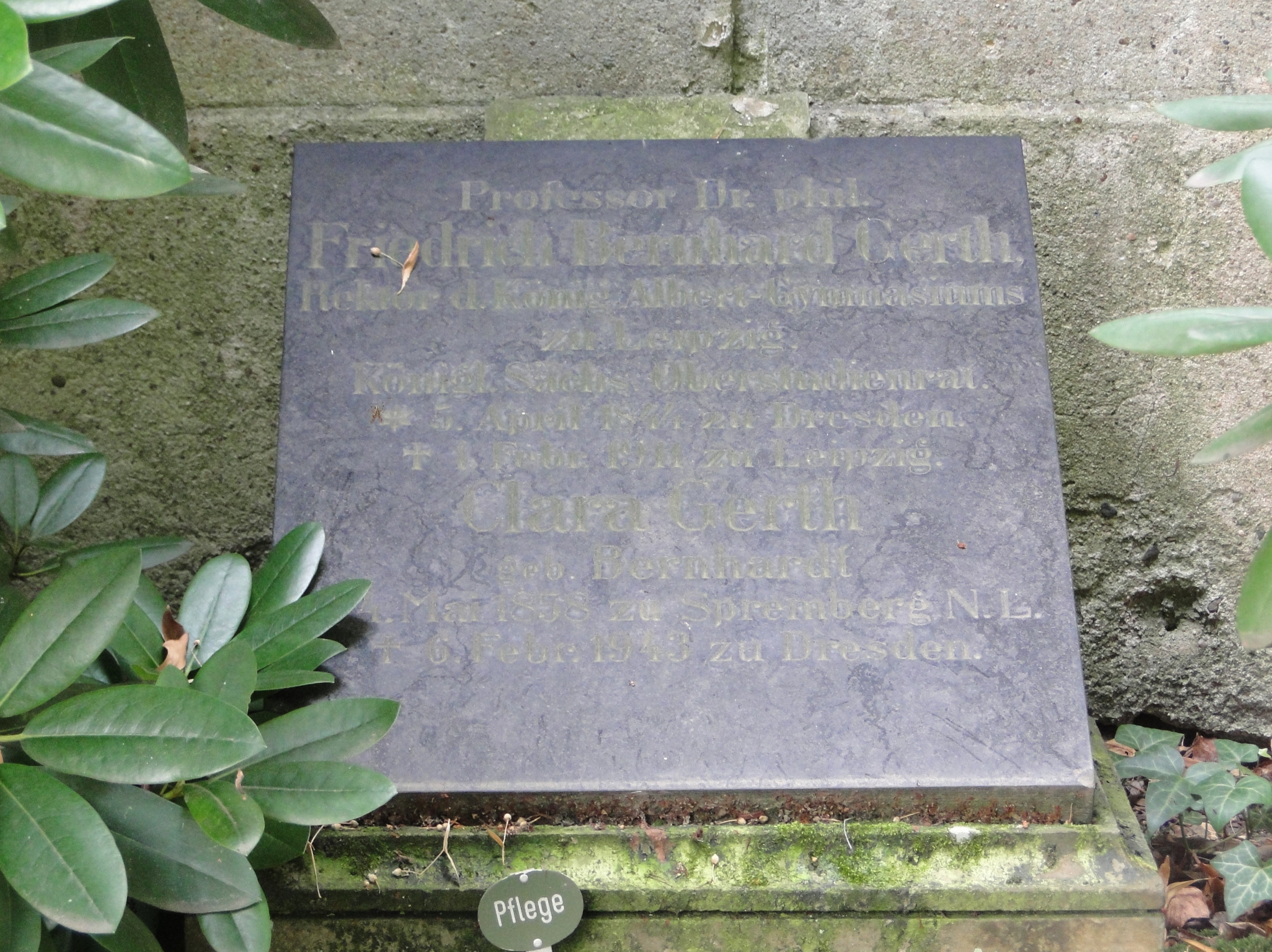
Gravesite of Gerth at Trinitatisfriedhof in Dresden.

With Friedrich Blass, he published the third edition of Raphael Kühner's "Ausführliche grammatik der griechischen sprache" (Expanded grammar of the Greek language), issued in four volumes from 1890 to 1904. Within this edition, Gerth distinguished himself with a masterful reworking of the section(s) pertaining to syntax.

From 1873 onward, he edited Georg Curtius' "Griechische Schulgrammatik" (Greek school grammar), and from 1902, with Johannes Ilberg, he was responsible for drafting the educational series "Neuen Jahrbüchern für das klassische Altertum, Geschichte und deutsche Literatur und für Pädagogik". Another noted written effort by Gerth was "Grammatisch-Kritisches zur griechischen Moduslehre" (1878).
