= Wilfrid Jelf =

Wilfrid Wykeham Jelf CMG DSO
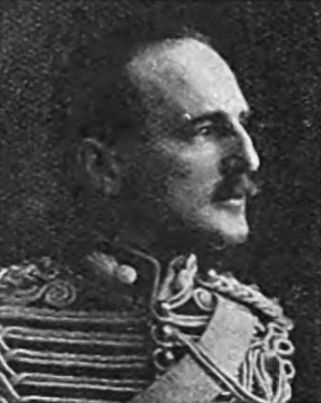
- Born: 22 July 1880; Halifax, Nova Scotia
- Died: 17 October 1933 (aged 53); Bridgwater, Somerset
- Military career
- Allegiance: United Kingdom
- Branch: British Army
- Service years: 1899–1932
- Rank: Colonel
- Units: Royal Horse and Royal Field Artillery
- Commands: 46th Division; 42nd (East Lancashire) Division
- Conflicts: Second Boer War; First World War
- Awards: Queen's South Africa Medal; King's South Africa Medal; Distinguished Service Order; Order of St Michael and St George

Colonel Wilfrid Wykeham Jelf, CMG, DSO (22 July 1880 – 17 October 1933) was a Canadian-born British Army officer and cricketer who played for Leicestershire in 1911. He fought in the South African War and First World War.

== Early life and education ==
Jelf was born in Halifax, Nova Scotia, the son of Colonel Richard Henry Jelf, formerly commandant of the Royal Military Academy, Woolwich, and Margaret Jelf. His grandfather was Richard William Jelf, Principal of King's College, London. His elder brother was Henry Jelf, a fellow cricketer who served in the Royal Navy. Wilfrid was educated at Cheam School and Eton College before attending the Royal Military Academy.

== Cricket ==
Jelf appeared in three first-class matches for Leicestershire as a right-handed batsman. He scored six runs with a highest score of 6.

== Career ==
After graduating from the Royal Military Academy, Jelf was commissioned as a second lieutenant in the Royal Horse and Royal Field Artillery on 22 November 1899. Jelf served in the Second Boer War from 1899 to 1902, during which he was promoted to lieutenant on 16 February 1901. Following the end of hostilities in June 1902, he left Cape Town for England and returned to Southampton in early August. He was mentioned in despatches and received the Queen's Medal with five clasps and King's Medal with two clasps. He was promoted to captain in 1908 and served as adjutant of the Nottinghamshire Territorial Force from 1908 to 1912.

Promoted to major in 1914, he served throughout the First World War. He was awarded the Distinguished Service Order in 1915. He was promoted to lieutenant colonel in 1918 and from April to July of that year served as temporary chief instructor at the Royal Military Academy. He was appointed a Companion of the Order of St Michael and St George in the 1919 New Year Honours.

In 1926, he was appointed commander of the 46th Division, and in 1927 appointed Assistant Adjutant-General at the War Office. From 1930 to 1931, he commanded the 42nd (East Lancashire) Division. From 1931 to his retirement in 1932, he was garrison commander and commandant at the Royal Artillery Depot in Woolwich.

== Personal life ==
In 1906, he married Cicely Helen Child, sister of Brigadier-General Sir Smith Child, 2nd Baronet. They had three children: 2nd Lt. Richard Hill Jelf (2 July 1910 – killed in action, July 1940); Lilah Margaret Jelf (born 13 October 1911), and Roderick Wilfrid Roylance Jelf (born 22 July 1914).

He became ill with disease in 1927, following his appointment to the War Office. While he recovered, the disease forced his retirement in 1932. Jelf died in Bridgwater, Somerset in 1933.

Following his death, he was eulogized in The Times by a friend:

Wilfrid Jelf was one of those rare beings of whom one can say, without any sense of exaggeration, that he seemed to have no fault. Yet he was the least priggish and most human of men, and no man of his time was more lovable and more loved. Modest, sincere, affectionate, openhearted, honest, and fearless, with a wonderful zest for living, the beauty of his nature found direct expression in his manner, giving it a charm and freshness which those who know him will never forget.

— C.T., letter to The Times, 21 October 1933
