= Hector Jelf =

English cricketer

Personal information
- Full name: Hector Gordon Jelf
- Born: 6 May 1917; Putney, Surrey, England
- Died: 11 December 1997 (aged 80); St Leonards-on-Sea, Sussex, England
- Batting: Right-handed
- Role: Wicket-keeper

Domestic team information
- Years: Team
- 1938: Oxford University

Career statistics
Competition	First-class
Matches	2
Runs scored	48
Batting average	16.00
100s/50s	–/–
Top score	35
Catches/stumpings	5/1
- Source: Cricinfo, 16 May 2020

Hector Gordon Jelf CBE (6 May 1917 – 11 December 1997) was an English first-class cricketer and British colonial official in Africa.

The son of Sir Arthur Selbourne Jelf, he was born at Putney in May 1917. He was educated at Marlborough College, before going up to Exeter College, Oxford. While studying at Oxford, he played first-class cricket for Oxford University in 1938, making two appearances against Yorkshire and a combined Minor Counties team. Playing as a wicket-keeper, he scored 48 runs, took five catches and made a single stumping.

After graduating from Oxford, he served in the Colonial Service in British West Africa. In the Second World War he was an emergency commission as a second lieutenant in the African Colonial Force in the first month of the war. Jelf resumed his duties in the Colonial Service after the war, holding a number of positions within the Nigerian colonial government, eventually rising to become the permanent secretary to the ministry of education from 1959–64. He was made a CBE in the 1962 New Year Honours. Jelf died in England at St Leonards-on-Sea in December 1997.
