= William Edward Jelf =

William Edward Jelf (1811–1875) was an English churchman and academic, known as a classical scholar.

== Life ==
Born 3 April 1811, he was fifth son of Sir James Jelf of Gloucester, and brother of Richard William Jelf. He was educated at Eton College and matriculated at Christ Church, Oxford, in July 1829. There he was elected a student in the same year, gained a first class in classics at the Easter examination and graduated B.A. in 1833, was M.A. in 1836, and B.D. in 1844.

Jelf was ordained in 1834. From 1836 to 1849 he was tutor of Christ Church, and for a time was senior censor. He was master of the schools, 1839; classical examiner, 1840, 1841, 1855, and 1856; proctor of the university, 1843; select preacher, 1855; and classical moderator, 1862, 1863. As proctor and senior censor he was unpopular, striking the wrong note with undergraduates.

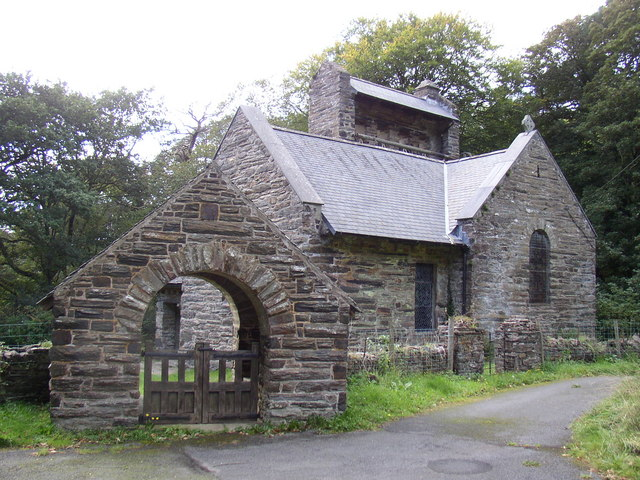
St Philip's Church, Caerdeon, built by William Edward Jelf

One of the Whitehall preachers from 1846 to 1848, Jelf left Oxford in 1849 to become vicar of Carleton, North Yorkshire, a college living. Here he remained till 1854, when he moved to Caerdeon, near Barmouth, in North Wales. He held no church preferment there, but officiated in a church, St Philip's, built on his own property and designed by his brother-in-law, John Louis Petit. It was consecrated and endowed as a district church in 1875. A significant court case permitted the use of the English language and opened the way to liturgical anglicisation in predominantly Welsh-speaking areas. In 1857 he delivered the Bampton lectures on The Christian Faith comprehensive and definite. He devoted much of his time to controversy: attacks on ritualism, confession, and mariolatry.

The last few months of Jelf's life were passed at Hastings, where he died on 18 October 1875.

== Works ==
Jelf's major work was his Greek grammar, first published in 1842–1845, 2 vols., Oxford, A Grammar of the Greek Language, chiefly from the German of Raphael Kühner. It had at least five editions, and in the later ones Jelf omitted Kühner's name from the title-page. He published a letter to Frederick Temple on Essays and Reviews, in 1860. Based on his notes, a commentary on the First Epistle of John was published with the Greek text in 1877, edited by William Webster.

== Family ==
Jelf married in 1849 Maria, youngest daughter of the Rev. John Hayes Petit and sister of John Louis Petit, who survived him, and had six children.

== Notes ==
Attribution

This article incorporates text from a publication now in the public domain: Lee, Sidney, ed. (1892). "Jelf, William Edward". Dictionary of National Biography. Vol. 29. London: Smith, Elder & Co.
