= Henry Jelf =

English cricketer and Royal Navy officer

Personal information
- Full name: Henry Francis Donhoff Jelf
- Born: 27 August 1877; Aldershot, Hampshire, England
- Died: 18 April 1944 (aged 66); Southport, Lancashire, England
- Relatives: Wilfrid Jelf (brother)

Domestic team information
- Years: Team
- 1910–1911: Derbyshire
- FC debut: 9 June 1910 Derbyshire v Surrey
- Last FC: 8 June 1911 Derbyshire v Northamptonshire

Career statistics
Competition	First-class
Matches	10
Runs scored	220
Batting average	11.00
100s/50s	0/0
Top score	37
Catches/stumpings	3/–
- Source: CricketArchive, November 2012

Henry Francis Donhoff Jelf (27 August 1877 – 18 April 1944) was a Royal Navy officer and a cricketer who played for Derbyshire in 1910 and 1911.

Jelf was born in Aldershot, Hampshire, the son of Richard Henry Jelf, an army officer, and his wife Mary. He joined the Royal Navy and became a Sub Lieutenant on 15 June 1897. He was made lieutenant on 31 December 1899. Serving on HMS Diana from 1908 to 1910, he was awarded a medal for action in Somaliland.

Jelf retired from naval service on 27 May 1910 and two weeks later, debuted for Derbyshire against Surrey on 9 June. He finished with just one run from his first two innings, though his batting form improved over the next few matches. He played in 4 further matches in 1910, making good scores in the first innings of matches on various occasions. He played five matches in 1911 scoring fewer runs than in his debut season. Jelf batted in 20 innings in 10 first-class matches with a top score of 37 and an average of 11.

Jelf returned to active service in World War I and retired again with the rank of Commander on 27 August 1917.

Jelf died in Southport Lancashire. His brother, Wilfrid, three years Henry's junior, was born in Canada and appeared for Leicestershire during the 1911 season.
