= Arthur Richard Jelf =

British judge (1837–1917)

Sir Arthur Jelf
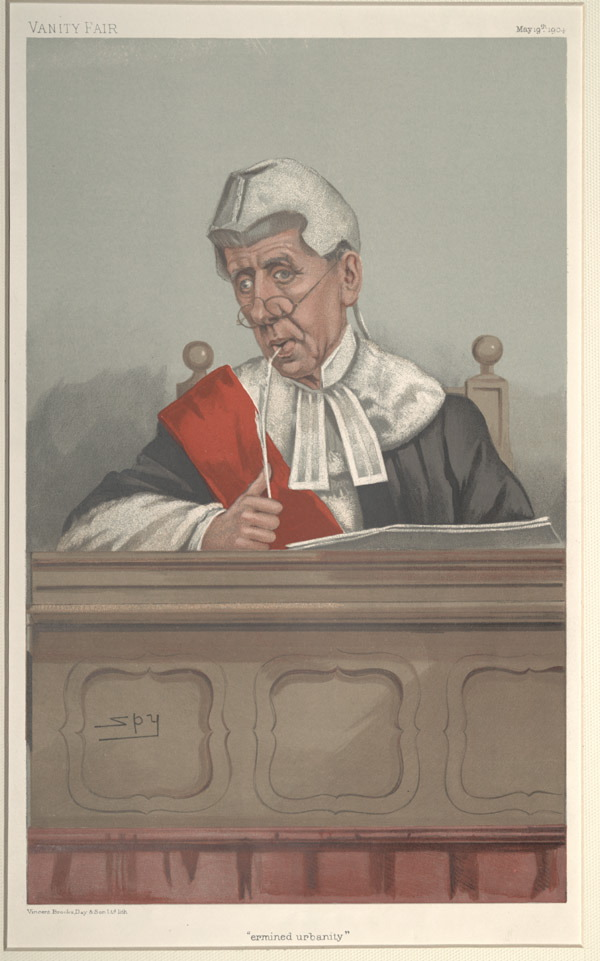
- Caricature by Leslie Ward, from Vanity Fair, May 19, 1904.

Justice of the High Court
- In office 1901–1910
- Preceded by: Sir John Day
- Succeeded by: Sir Montague Lush

Personal details
- Born: Arthur Richard Jelf
- Education: Christ Church, Oxford

Sir Arthur Richard Jelf (10 September 1837 in Pankow, near Berlin – 24 July 1917 in Putney) was an English judge.

He was the son of the Rev. Richard William Jelf, principal of King's College, London, by his wife Countess Emmy Schlippenbach, at one time maid of honour to the queen of Hanover. He was educated at Eton College and Christ Church, Oxford, where he took his degree in 1860. He was called to the bar at the Inner Temple in April 1863, became a Q.C. in 1880, and was elected a Bencher of his Inn in 1883.

In 1883, Jelf, Sir William Lancaster, and Baron Pollock founded the Putney School of Art and Design.

From 1879 to 1901, he was recorder of Shrewsbury, and in November 1901 was raised to the bench as a justice of the High Court of Justice and knighted.

He resigned in 1910 and died in 1917.
