= St Lawrence's Church, Mereworth =

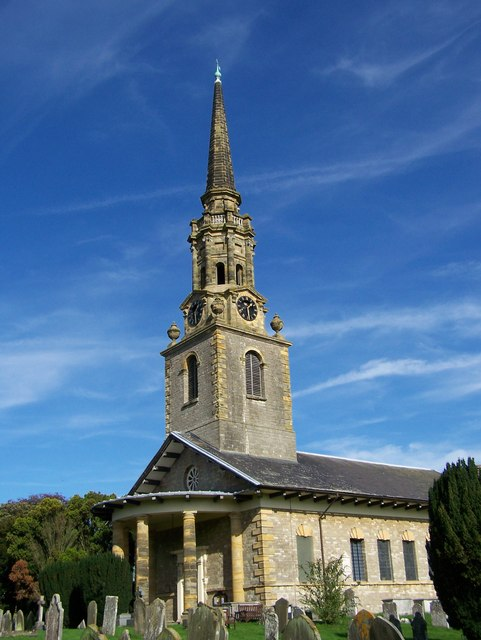
- St Lawrence's, October 2006

- Location in Kent
- 51°15′32″N 0°22′40″E
- OS grid reference: TQ 66018 53752
- Location: Mereworth, Kent
- Country: England
- Denomination: Church of England

History
- Status: Parish church
- Founder: John Fane, 7th Earl of Westmorland
- Consecrated: 26 August 1746

Architecture
- Functional status: Active
- Heritage designation: Grade I listed
- Style: Neo-Palladian
- Groundbreaking: 1744
- Completed: 1746

Administration
- Province: Canterbury
- Diocese: Rochester
- Deanery: West Malling
- Parish: Mereworth

St Lawrence's Church is an Anglican parish church at Mereworth, Kent, United Kingdom. It is in the deanery of West Malling, the Diocese of Rochester and Province of Canterbury. The church was built in the mid-1740s by John Fane, the 7th Earl of Westmorland, following his removal of the village's 12th century place of worship to allow for the enlargement of Mereworth Castle.

The Neo-Palladian style stone structure has been described as "the outstanding 18th-century church in the county, in scale, ambition and architectural interest". The architect is unknown, but prominent Palladian-era figures such as Henry Flitcroft, James Gibbs and Roger Morris have been suggested.

Many internal fixtures survive from the medieval church, including heraldic stained glass and a series of high-quality brass and stone memorials. Alterations were made several times in the 19th and 20th centuries, including repairs to wartime bomb damage, and restoration work undertaken in 2009. The church has been awarded Grade I listed status in view of its architectural and historical importance.

== History ==
=== Medieval church ===
There was already a church dedicated to St Lawrence in Mereworth during the reign of Henry II (1154–89), when its advowson belonged to Roger de Mereworth. The original church was said to have been built by the de Clares and was appropriated by the Knights Hospitallers on its foundation. During the reign of Henry II, there was a dispute between de Mereworth and Leeds Priory concerning the patronage of the church. Gilbert, Bishop of Rochester, was asked to adjudicate on the dispute. He found in favour of de Mereworth, but the parson of the church was to pay the sum of 40s per annum to the priory as a perpetual benefice. Shortly after the settlement of the dispute the church was granted to Tonbridge Priory, in whose possession it remained until the priory was dissolved in 1525. The church then passed into the possession of Cardinal Wolsey, but was amongst the properties forfeited to the Crown in 1529.

The advowson was then granted to Sir George Nevill, passing on his death to his son Henry Nevill and on Henry's death to his daughter Mary, thus coming into the possession of her husband Thomas Fane. In 1589, Leeds Priory abandoned their right to the benefice granted by Gilbert of Rochester. In 1634, the church possessed lands amounting to some 352 acres (142 ha) in Mereworth.

In the 1720s Mereworth Castle was rebuilt as Palladian villa to a design by Colen Campbell and in the 1740s two flanking pavilions and a stable block were added, necessitating the removal of the church; in 1744 John Fane, the 7th Earl of Westmorland, obtained a faculty for the demolition of the "ancient and most inconvenient" church.

=== Present church ===
Fane built the new church on a site in the centre of the village, 5/8 mi (1.0 km) northwest of its predecessor. Construction began in 1744 and was completed two years later, with consecration by Joseph Wilcocks, the Bishop of Rochester, on 26 August 1746. Coffins and memorials from the old church were moved to the new building. John Grinsted, the son of John and Mary Grinsted was the first person to be baptised in the church on 23 September 1746. There had been no burials or marriages in the village in 1745 due to the lack of a church.

In 1752, Horace Walpole visited the church. He said that it seemed designed for Cheapside and that the spire was so tall that the poor church curtsied beneath it. Thomas Benge Burr in his History of Tunbridge Wells (1766) said that the church "will bear, and indeed richly deserves, the attentive inspection of the curious traveller".

In 1770, the church was "repaired and beautified", possibly by Nicholas Revett, who went on to design Mereworth Rectory in 1780. In 1798, the advowson of the church was in the ownership of Francis, Lord de Despencer. The annual income of the church was then valued at £14 2s 6d.

The spire was rebuilt in 1870, and in 1875 a new round-arched window was cut into the east wall of the church. It is flanked on either side by blind windows. The bells were repaired in 1885 and a clock was installed in the base of the lantern at the top of the tower in 1894, in memory of Eliot Stapleton, rector of Mereworth from 1874 to 1892. A plan by the architect George Crickmay, dated 1896, to extend the church eastwards by building an apse of the same proportions as the west portico was not carried out.

Major repairs were carried out to the spire in 1946–47 under the supervision of architect Kenneth Dalgleish, following damage sustained during the Second World War. In 1957, the bells were again repaired. On 25 August 1959, the church was added to the register of listed buildings. It is Grade I listed. The clock was repaired in 1972 in memory of George Prentice, rector of Mereworth from 1966 to 1970. A new fibreglass clock face was fitted at this time and the winding mechanism converted to electric power. In 2005, an inspection revealed that the church needed major repairs. English Heritage made a grant that covered 95% of the £500,000 cost of restoration. The work was carried out under the supervision of architects Thomas Ford & Partners, and won the 2009 Georgian Group award for best restoration of a Georgian church.

The church is still actively used as a place of worship - details can be found on the church website.

== Description ==
St Lawrence's is a Palladian-style building by an unknown architect. Colen Campbell worked in a similar style, although he died in 1722, so the design may have been executed by one of his followers. The second-generation Palladian architect Henry Flitcroft has been suggested; by 1746 he was the master carpenter at three London palaces, and his St Giles in the Fields at Holborn was London's first Palladian-style church. James Gibbs has also been suggested, as the spire of St Lawrence's is similar to that of St Martin-in-the-Fields in the City of Westminster, London. Sir Howard Colvin tentatively attributes the church to Roger Morris.

=== Exterior ===
The church is of blocks of Kentish ragstone with dressed ashlar Wealden sandstone used for the porch columns, quoins and tower. The sandstone has galletted joints. It has a simple rectangular form in the 18th-century "temple church" style. St Paul's, Covent Garden in London, an early Palladian church by Inigo Jones, was the model for the design, which was then "purified by neo-Palladian theory". The roof is covered in slate and has prominent eaves and pedimented ends.

Rising above the roof at the west end of the church is a tall tower topped with a steeple flanked by decorative urns. The stone structure, with its square base supporting octagonal upper stages with columned sides and a balustrade, is so similar to the steeple at St Giles in the Fields that the Buildings of England series says that it was "copied almost directly" from that church. Projecting from the west end below the pedimented end of the roof is a semicircular open porch with Tuscan columns topped by a cornice. Its design is based on that of the Baroque church of St Paul's, Deptford; St Mary le Strand in central London has also been cited as a model. The tower has a peal of six bells, cast in 1746 by Joseph Eayre of St Neots, Huntingdonshire. They are in the Key of G.

=== Interior ===
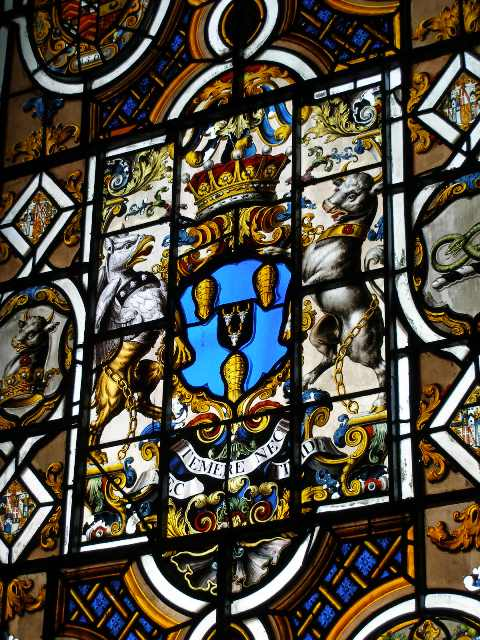
Victorian stained glass in St Lawrence's Church

The interior is in a Neoclassical style. Entrance to the church is through a porch at the west end, which leads into a circular chamber in the base of the tower. Rooms to the sides of this vestibule house monuments from the original church. On the north side is the Yotes Court Chapel, where the brass of William Shosmyth and his wife Julian can be found. Shosmyth was the warden of the religious guild of the Worshipful Company of Skinners in 1461, and the brass has the earliest known representation of the Skinners' coat of arms. As of 2011, this chapel serves as a vestry. On the south side is the Despencer or Lady Chapel. It contains the brasses to Sir John de Mereworth and Thomas Nevill, and monuments to either Edward Neville, 3rd Baron Bergavenny or his son George Nevill, 4th Baron Bergavenny. Another memorial contains the heart of George Nevill, 5th Baron Bergavenny. The tomb of Sir Thomas Fane and his wife Mary. Their sons Francis and George are depicted kneeling at the base of the tomb.

Beyond the vestibule is a wide aisled nave, seven bays long, its barrel-vaulted ceiling painted with trompe-l'œil coffering ("not very convincingly" according to the Buildings of England guide), a chancel and a side chapel. The nave and aisles are separated by painted marble-effect stone Doric columns, which were originally partly panelled, They support a horizontal entablature rather than the more usual arches. The strict geometry of the interior – each bay of the aisles is a square, and the nave is three times wider than each aisle – gives it an "austere Neoclassical appearance" not normally associated with the Georgian era in which it was built.

At the east end is a grandiose lunette or "Diocletian window", in imitation of the type used at Roman baths, filling the space left clear by the arch of the barrel vault. Below this is the round-headed window added in 1875.

Fixtures include a marble font which is contemporary with the church. There is much stained glass: the oldest, in the form of heraldic emblems in cartouches, dates from 1562 and is visible in the Diocletian window in the east wall and in another window on the southwest side. The east window was erected in memory of Sir Frank Stapleton, rector of Mereworth 1832–74. Other similar glass dates from the 17th and 18th centuries. Another, depicting the Raising of Lazarus, was designed by Frederic Shields for the Heaton, Butler and Bayne firm in 1889.

The organ is by Gray and Davison. It was installed in 1882 by Lord Falmouth at a cost of £200. In 1892, the rector, E H Stapleton extended the range of the organ in memory of his wife.

The crypt contains several Fane coffins.

== Memorials, brasses and notable burials ==
Memorials

- Sir Thomas Fane, High Sheriff of Kent in 1572. This "grandiose standing monument" dates from 1639 and depicts Fane and his wife (d 1626) reclining above their kneeling sons. It is supported on a prominent entablature carried on Corinthian columns.
- James Master (d 1689). His memorial is a cartouche of marble.

Brasses

- Sir John de Mereworth, High Sheriff of Kent in 1340 and joint High Sheriff of Kent in 1341, who fought at the siege of Calais in 1346. The "fine brass", 33 inches (84 cm) long, shows de Mereworth as a knight and closely resembles brasses of a similar era at St Mary Magdalene's Church in Cobham, Kent.
- William Shosmyth (d 1479). Warden of the religious guild of the Worshipful Company of Skinners in 1461. His brass is 18 inches (46 cm) long.

Burials

- Evelyn Boscawen, 6th Viscount Falmouth.
- George Byng, 7th Viscount Torrington, courtier.
- John Fane, 7th Earl of Westmorland, builder of the church.
- Mary Fane, Countess of Westmorland, wife of John Fane.
- William Hutcheon Hall, Royal Navy admiral.
- Charles Davis Lucas, first person to win the Victoria Cross.
- Thomas Nevill (c1480–1542), Speaker of the House of Commons 1514–15. He is commemorated inside by a monument decorated with quatrefoil emblems and angels and surmounted by a "poor brass" 18 inches (46 cm) long.
- Francesco Sleter (d 1775), Italian artist. He also has a wall-mounted memorial on the south side of the church.
- Sir Robert Southwell, Master of the Rolls 1541–50.

The crypt contains several Fane coffins.

The churchyard contains the Commonwealth war graves of two British Army soldiers of World War I.

== The church today ==
The parish covers Mereworth village, the surrounding rural area and part of the village of Kings Hill. Administratively, it is part of a joint benefice with St Dunstan's Church at neighbouring West Peckham.

As a Grade I listed building, the church is considered by English Heritage to be of "exceptional interest" and greater than national importance. As of February 2001, it was one of 38 Grade I listed buildings, and 1,291 listed buildings of all grades, in the district of Tonbridge and Malling – the local government district in which Mereworth is situated.

The church is still in active use as a place of worship each Sunday and the church website gives full details of times of services.

== See also ==
- List of places of worship in Tonbridge and Malling

== Sources ==
- Burr, Thomas Benge (1766). The History of Tunbridge Wells. Tunbridge Wells: Thomas Benge Burr. (p243, p244)
- Dearn, T. W. (1814). An Historical, Topographical and Descriptive Account of the Weald of Kent. Cranbrook: S Reader.
- Hasted, Edward (1798). The History and Topographical Survey of the County of Kent – Volume V. Canterbury: W Bristow. (p87, p88, p89, p90)
- Ireland, William Henry (1829). England's topographer, or A new and complete history of the county of Kent. Vol. 3. London: G.Virtue. pp. 509–10.
- Newman, John (1976). West Kent and the Weald. Buildings of England (2nd ed.). Harmondsworth: Penguin Books. ISBN 0-14-071038-8.
- Page, Willam (1926). Houses of Austin canons: The priory of Tonbridge. Institute of Historical Research.
- Wells, Andrew (2006). The Parish Church of St. Lawrence, Mereworth. Mereworth: Andrew Wells.
