= Fane family =

Notable english family

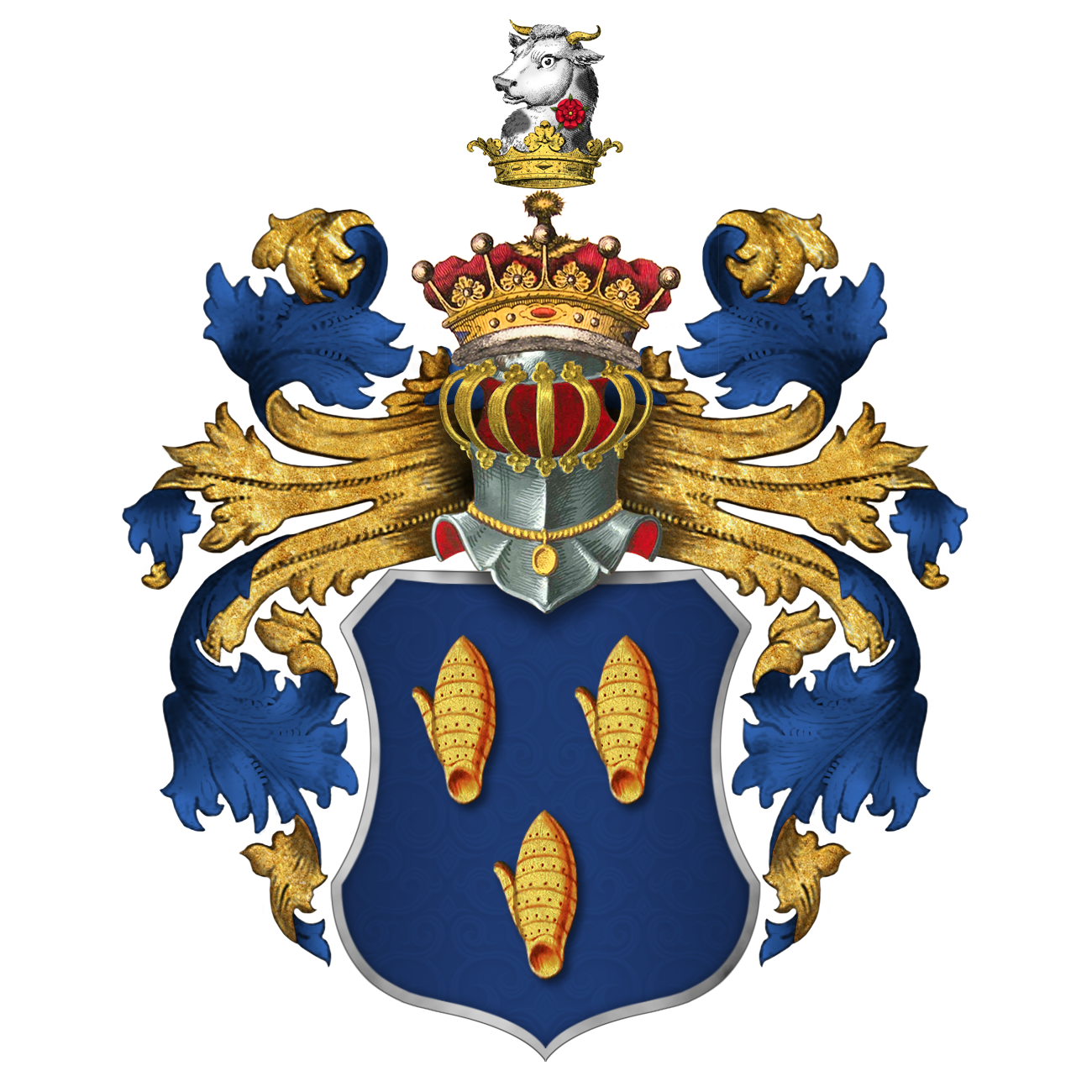
Coat of Arms of the Fane family (Earls of Westmoreland)

Coat of Arms of the Vane family (Earls of Darlington)

Fane, an English surname of Welsh origins, can identify a family which has produced a number of notable members. The family allegedly descends from Ivon Vane, a Welsh landowner and mercenary captain in the service of the Black Prince. (Note: According to The Complete Peerage "the long line of Welsh descent, as given in the Heraldic Visitation of Kent 1574, is spurious".) Ivon Vane or "John Fane", as he was known in English, was one of three captains who captured King John II of France at the battle of Poitiers 1356. He was knighted and shared in the ransom monies, which made him very wealthy. He settled in Kent. His descendants include two notable families: the Fane family, whose members became the Earls of Westmoreland; and the Vane family, who became the Earls of Darlington. Both families have golden gauntlets on their arms in memory of the surrender of King John.

The Fane family were Kentish gentry until Sir Thomas Fane (died 1589) made one of the most advantageous matches of the Tudor period when he married Mary the daughter of Henry Nevill, 6th Baron Bergavenny. Mary was one of the great Tudor heiresses, she was the last heiress of the mediaeval House of Neville and one of England's largest landowners. Mary inherited the titles of Baron le Despenser and Baron Bergavenny from her father, whilst her son, Sir Francis Fane, chose the title of "Earl of Westmorland" when he was raised to the Earldom in 1624 by King James I of England. (The original Neville Earldom of Westmoreland had been confiscated in 1571 from Mary Fane's cousin Charles Neville, 6th Earl of Westmorland for his part in the Rising of the North of 1569.)

The family went on to produce over 50 Members of Parliament, as well as soldiers, bankers, imperial administrators and some notable writers. The Fanes married judiciously and inherited estates in Northamptonshire, Lincolnshire, Dorset, Somerset, Devon, and Oxfordshire, as well as retaining their original lands in Kent. Sir Francis Fane of Fulbeck was one of the founding investors in the Virginia Company that settled the new world and the family were also large landowners in Canada (mainly on Prince Edward Island), and in South Africa, as well as having extensive commercial interests in India.

Several Fanes served in India as administrators, as employees of the East India Company, and as soldiers. Two Indian regiments were raised by family members, including Fane's Horse (established in 1860). General Sir Henry Fane served as Commander-in-Chief of all British forces in India from 1835 to 1839. A Fane also commanded in the West Indies.

The family owned a number of family seats, including:

- Apethorpe Hall, Northamptonshire
- Mereworth Castle, Kent
- Fulbeck Hall, Lincolnshire
- Wormsley Park, Oxfordshire
- Basildon Park, Berkshire
- Osterley Park, Middlesex
- Brympton d'Evercy, Somerset
- Clovelly, Devon
- Avon Tyrell, Hampshire

== See also ==
- Fane (surname)
- Vane (surname)
