= David Cecil, 3rd Earl of Exeter =

English peer

The Right Honourable David Cecil
- The Earl of Exeter
- Tenure: 1640–1643
- Predecessor: William Cecil, 2nd Earl of Exeter
- Successor: John Cecil, 4th Earl of Exeter
- Born: c. 1600
- Died: 1643 (aged 42–43)
- Spouse: Lady Elizabeth Egerton
- Issue: John Cecil, 4th Earl of Exeter; Lady Frances Cecil
- Father: Sir Richard Cecil
- Mother: Elizabeth Cope

David Cecil, 3rd Earl of Exeter (c. 1600–1643) was an English peer and member of the House of Lords.

== Life ==
David Cecil was the son of Sir Richard Cecil of Wakerley, Northamptonshire. He was educated at Clare College, Cambridge, and admitted at Lincoln's Inn in 1627. In 1640, he sat for Peterborough in the Short Parliament. He inherited the earldom in July 1640 from his uncle William Cecil, 2nd Earl of Exeter.

He married Elizabeth Egerton (d. 1688), daughter of John Egerton, 1st Earl of Bridgewater. Their daughter, Lady Frances Cecil (1633–1652), married Anthony Ashley Cooper, 1st Earl of Shaftesbury. He was succeeded by his son John Cecil, 4th Earl of Exeter.

Parliament of England
Preceded by Lord Burghersh; Laurence Whitacre	Member of Parliament for Peterborough; 1640; With: The Lord FitzWilliam	Succeeded by The Lord FitzWilliam; Sir Robert Napier
Peerage of England
Preceded by William Cecil	Earl of Exeter; 1640–1643	Succeeded by John Cecil
