= Countess of Exeter =

Countess of Exeter is a title normally given to the wife of the Earl of Exeter. Women who have held this title include:

- Frances Cecil, Countess of Exeter (died 1663) (née Brydges; 1580–1663) (2nd wife of 1st Earl)
- Frances Cecil, Countess of Exeter (died 1669) (née Manners; 1630-1669) (1st wife of the 4th Earl)
- Lady Mary Fane (1639–1681) (2nd wife of the 4th Earl)
- Anne Cecil, Countess of Exeter (née Cavendish; c.1649–1704) (wife of the 5th Earl)
- Sarah Cecil, Countess of Exeter (née Hoggins; 1773-1797) (2nd wife of the 10th Earl)
- Elizabeth Hamilton, Duchess of Hamilton (née Burrell; 1757-1837) (3rd wife of the 10th Earl)
