= Frances Cecil, Countess of Exeter =

Frances Cecil, Countess of Exeter may refer to:

- Frances Cecil, Countess of Exeter (died 1663) (1580–1663), English noblewoman, wife of Thomas Smith (English judge) and Thomas Cecil, 1st Earl of Exeter
- Frances Cecil, Countess of Exeter (died 1669) (1630–1669), English noblewoman, wife of John Cecil, 4th Earl of Exeter

== See also ==
- Countess of Exeter (disambiguation)
