= Badsell =

Coordinates: 51°10′40″N 0°22′13″E

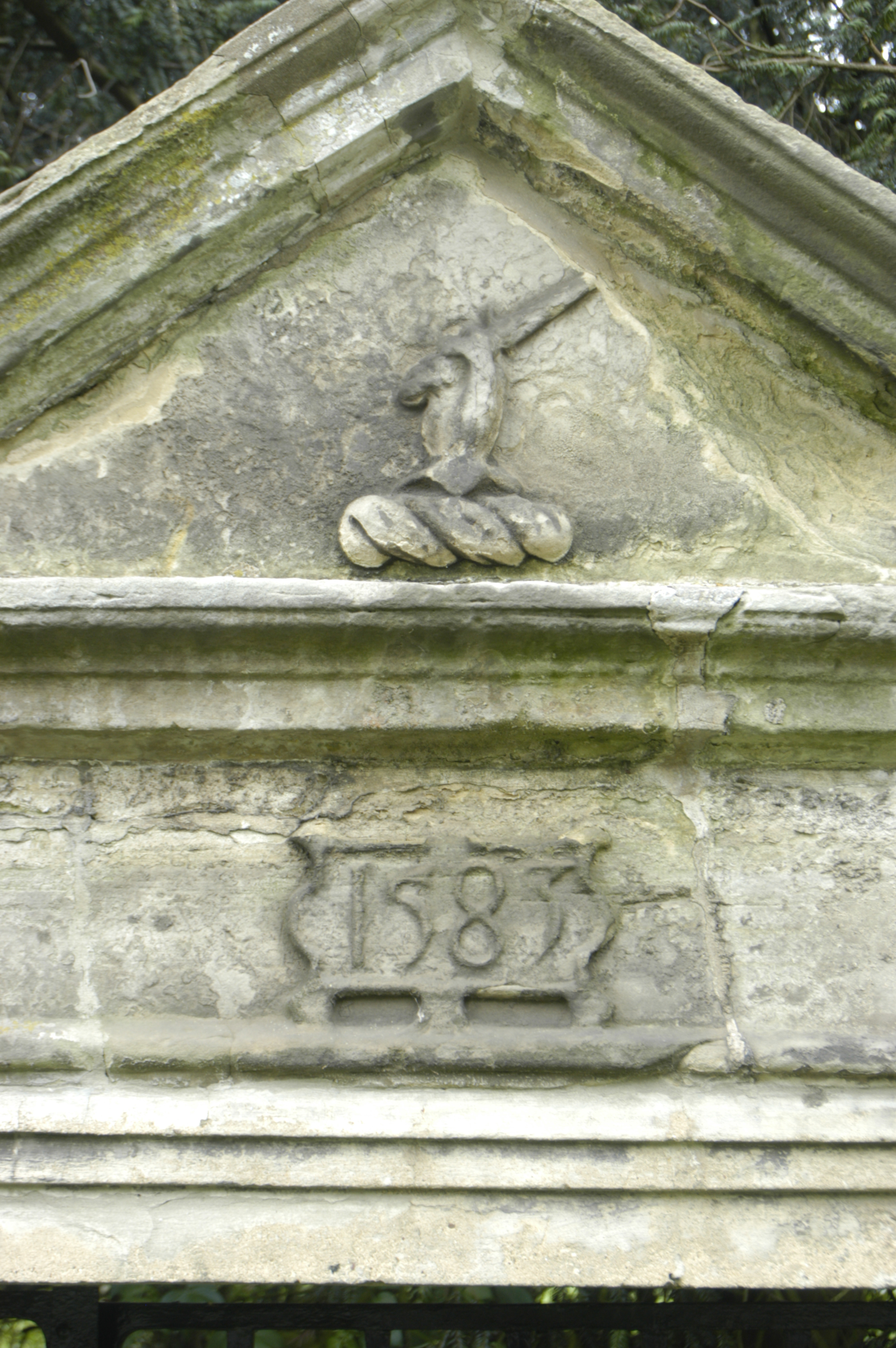
Tudor doorway commemorating Thomas Fane and Mary Nevile erected in late 16th c. at Badsell, but moved to Fulbeck in Lincolnshire in the 20th.c.

Badsell in the parish of Tudeley in Kent, is an historic estate, near today's village of Paddock Wood.

== History ==
Hasted (1798) wrote as follows:

Badesll is the principal manor in this parish (i.e. Tudeley), lying at the south-east end of it, which formerly gave both residence and surname to a family, who were some time possessors of it. At length, by a daughter and coheir, Marian Badsell, it was carried in marriage to Thomas Stidulf, from whom the family of that name in Surry were descended; he resided at Badsell, and was only son and heir of Robert, and heir likewise of his uncle Henry Stidulf. He died anno 36 Henry VI. and lies buried with his wife in this church. They left an only daughter and heir Agnes, who carried this manor in marriage to Richard Fane, esq. of Tudeley, who died possessed of it in the 32d year of king Henry VIII. and was buried in the chapel of this church, which he himself had caused to be made. His son, George Fane, esq. resided at Badsell, as did his son, Sir Thomas Fane, which last having married lady Mary, daughter and sole heir of Henry Nevill, lord Abergavenny, became possessed of the castle and manor of Mereworth, where afterwards he resided much, as his son, Sir Francis Fane, earl of Westmoreland, did entirely; since which this mansion has been made use of only as a farm house, and in his descendants, earls of Westmoreland, this manor continued to John Fane, earl of Westmoreland, who dying s.p. in 1762, it has now at length by the limitations of his will come, with the rest of his Kentish estates, into the possession of the right hon. Thomas, lord le Despencer, the present owner of it.

== The estate ==
The estate includes a Grade II listed house and a leylandii hedge maze.
