= 1785 in sports =

1785 in sports describes the year's events in world sport.

== Boxing ==
Events

- 7 June — Bill Harvey defeated Harry Sellers in a 20-minute fight at Ash Fields.

== Cricket ==
Events

- First definite mention in the sources of Billy Beldham. The rise of the White Conduit Club foreshadowed a shift of direction by cricket's hierarchy from rural Hampshire to metropolitan London.

England

- Most runs – Richard Stanford 124
- Most wickets – Richard Hosmer 7

== Horse racing ==
England

- The Derby – Aimwell
- The Oaks – Trifle
- St Leger Stakes – Cowslip
