= Francesco Sleter =

Italian painter

Francesco Sleter (1685 – 29 August 1775) was an Italian painter, active in England.

He was born in Venice. He is believed to have studied under Gregorio Lazzarini. He was in England by 1719 when he designed the stained glass windows for James Brydges, 1st Duke of Chandos in the chapel at Cannons, these are now in the church at Great Witley. Other work at Cannons involved painting the staircase ceiling with the Triumph of Victory, the anteroom ceiling with an allegory of Eternity and Fame and the Best Bedchamber with an allegory of Love and Marriage. At Grimsthorpe Castle for Peregrine Bertie, 2nd Duke of Ancaster and Kesteven in the mid-1720s he is attributed with painting the dining room ceiling with Liberal Arts and the staircase ceiling with Triumph of Cybele. At Mereworth Castle for John Fane, 7th Earl of Westmorland he painted the gallery ceiling with Rococo ornament and various mythological subjects and also the East Bedroom ceiling with panels of playing cupids. At Moor Park he worked with Sir James Thornhill and painted the four inset paintings in the gallery of the hall of Sileno and Amazzone, Baccanale and Zingara, Flora and Ercole and Iside and Apollo he also contributed to the mural paintings in the saloon and staircase hall. At the now demolished Moulsham Hall he painted the dining room. At Stowe House he worked with the architect William Kent for Viscount Cobham and was active in both the house and several of the temples in the gardens during the 1730s & 1740s, including the ceiling and the now destroyed murals of the Grand Staircase the ceiling of the State Dining Room, the Temple of Venus, The Temple of Friendship, the Imperial Closet and The Queen's Temple none of the work in the garden survives apart from The Chinese House. He was also responsible for the mural paintings at St. Lawrence church, Whitchurch, London, for the 1st Duke of Chandos, the ceiling was painted by Louis Laguerre. He retired to Mereworth where there is a memorial tablet to him in the church.
