= Mary Fane =

Mary Fane may refer to:

- Lady Mary Fane (1639–1681)
- Mary Mildmay Fane, Countess of Westmorland (c. 1582–1640)
