= Thomas Fane (died 1589) =

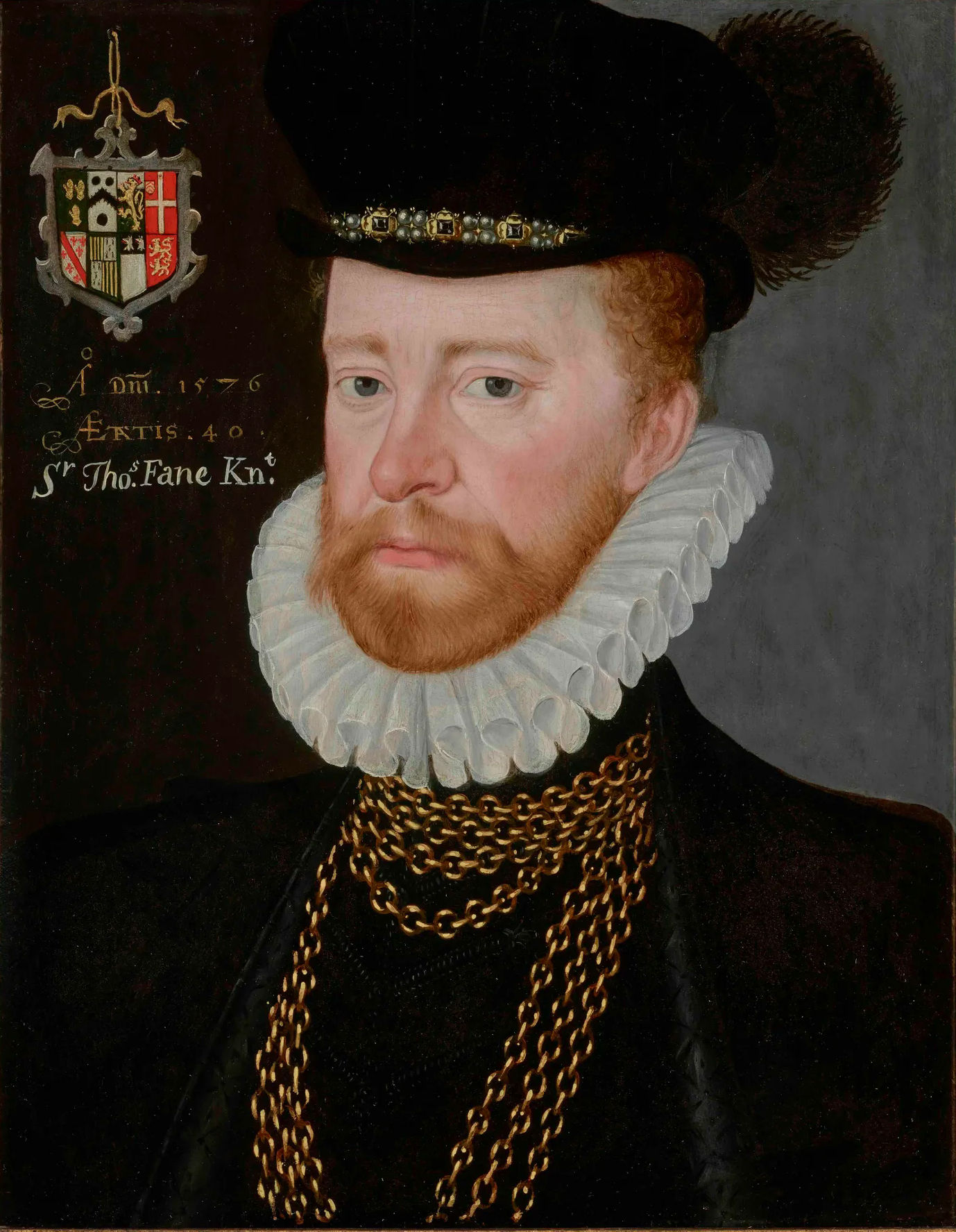
Sir Thomas Fane by George Gower, 1576

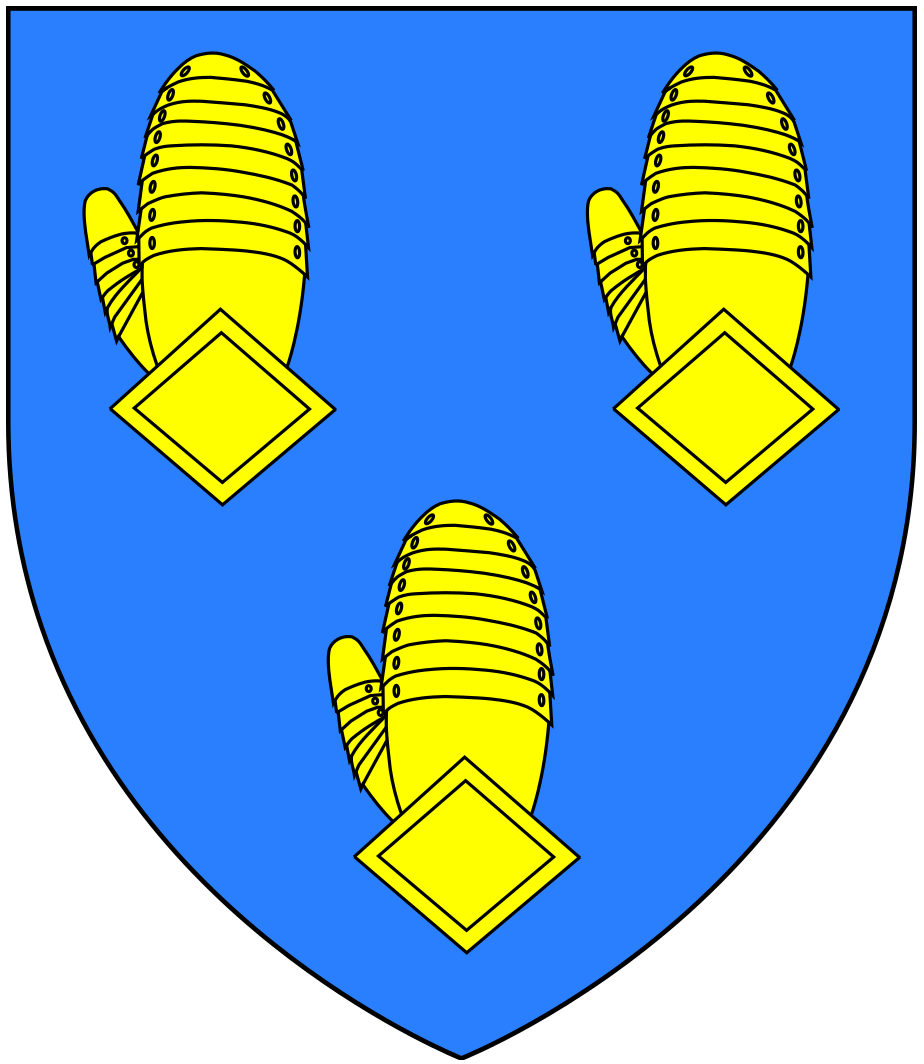
Arms of Fane: Azure, three dexter gauntlets back affrontée or

Thomas Fane (c. 1538–1589) of Badsell Manor in the parish of Tudeley in Kent, and of Mereworth Castle, Kent, was Sheriff of Kent. He is not to be confused with his younger brother, Thomas Fane (died 1607), of Burston, Hunton, Kent, a Member of Parliament for Dover.

== Origins ==
Monument to George Fane (d.1572), All Saints' Church, Tudeley

Not to be confused with his younger brother also named Thomas Fane, he was born about 1538 at Badsell, the elder son of George Fane (died 1572) of Badsell, Sheriff of Kent in 1557 and 1558 (whose monument survives in Tudeley Church), by his first wife Joan Waller (d. 1545), daughter of William Waller of Groombridge, Sheriff of Kent in 1530. George Fane was the son of Richard Fane (or a'Vane) by his wife Agnes Stidulf, the daughter and heiress of Henry Stidulf of Badsell, the son of Thomas Stidulf (d. 1457) and his wife Marion Badsell, heiress of Badsell, which latter couple's inscribed monumental brass survives in the chancel of Tudeley Church. George Fane married secondly Elizabeth Hendley, a daughter of Sir Walter Hendley of Corsehorne, Cranbrooke.

=== Early origins ===
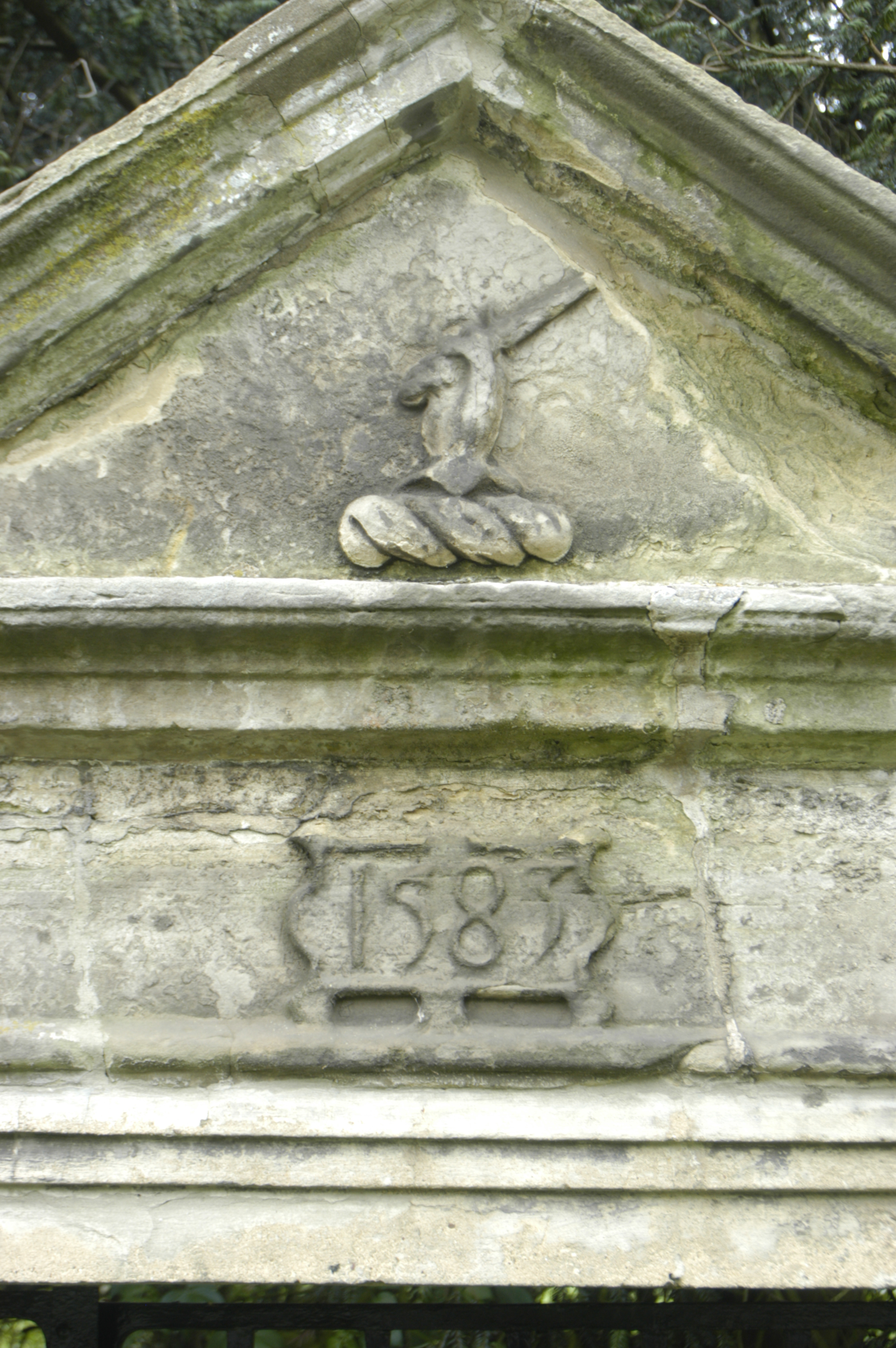
16th-century Fane gateway from Badsell, Kent, but now in Fulbeck, Lincolnshire. Dated 1583 it bears the initials TF and MF, for Thomas Fane and his wife Mary Neville. Note how it shows the original Fane crest

According to tradition, and to the Heraldic Visitation of Kent in 1574, the Fane/Vane family was descended from Captain Sir John Fane (or Ivon Vane as he was also known), a Welsh gentleman who captured King John II of France at the Battle of Poitiers in 1356 and received a share of the huge ransom money, which took the French people eight years to raise. His descendants, the families of Fane (Earl of Westmorland) and Vane (Marquess of Londonderry), use for their heraldic crests a golden gauntlet which was awarded him at the Battle of Poitiers in 1356, and also three golden gauntlets in their coat of arms.

However, according to The Complete Peerage (1959) relying on their source Fane (1897), the earliest proven recorded ancestor of the Fane family of Kent is "Henry a Vane" (d. 1456/7) of Tonbridge, Kent, thrice-great-grandfather of Francis Fane, 1st Earl of Westmorland. The Complete Peerage also states that "the long line of Welsh descent, as given in the Heraldic Visitation of Kent 1574, is spurious" and their source (Fane (1897)) states it to be "rendered so doubtful by negative evidence as to be no longer capable of support". However, Keith W. Murray (1897), published in the same source as Fane (1897) vindicates the Welsh pedigree and severely criticises the methodology of Fane (1897), followed by the Complete Peerage.

== Career ==
After an education at Maidstone Grammar School Fane, who was a committed Protestant, was convicted of treason in 1554 for his involvement in Wyatt's rebellion and was sentenced to death. After four months of imprisonment in the Tower of London, he was pardoned by Queen Mary on account of his youth and on the condition that he took the Oath of Loyalty. Fane went on to serve as High Sheriff of Kent in 1572 and in 1573 was knighted for services to the crown.

A monument to Fane survives in St Lawrence's Church, Mereworth, Kent.

== Marriages and children ==
He married twice:

- Firstly to Elizabeth Culpepper who died in child-birth;
- Secondly to Mary Neville, Baroness le Despencer, daughter and heiress of Henry Nevill, 6th Baron Bergavenny by his wife Frances Manners a daughter of Thomas Manners, 1st Earl of Rutland. Mary Neville was a great heiress, the last one of the House of Neville, and was one of England's largest landowners. Mary Neville inherited suo jure the titles of Baron le Despenser and Baron Bergavenny from her father. The Barony of le Despenser was called out of abeyance in 1604 in her favour and accordingly, she became 3rd Baroness le Despenser. She was also, by modern doctrine, 7th and 5th Baroness Bergavenny, having inherited the senior two Baronies of Bergavenny from her father on his death, as well as his estates in Kent centred on Mereworth Castle. Her son was granted the title Earl of Westmorland when he was raised to that rank by King James I. The original Neville Earldom of Westmoreland had been confiscated in 1571 from Mary Neville's cousin Charles Neville, 6th Earl of Westmorland due to his participation in the Rising of the North. By Mary Neville he had issues including:
  - Francis Fane, 1st Earl of Westmorland, 4th Baron le Despenser, de facto 8th and de jure 6th Baron Bergavenny, eldest son and heir.
  - George Fane of Burston, Kent.
