= Great Culverden Park =

Woodland in Kent, England

Coordinates: 51°08′17″N 0°15′22″E

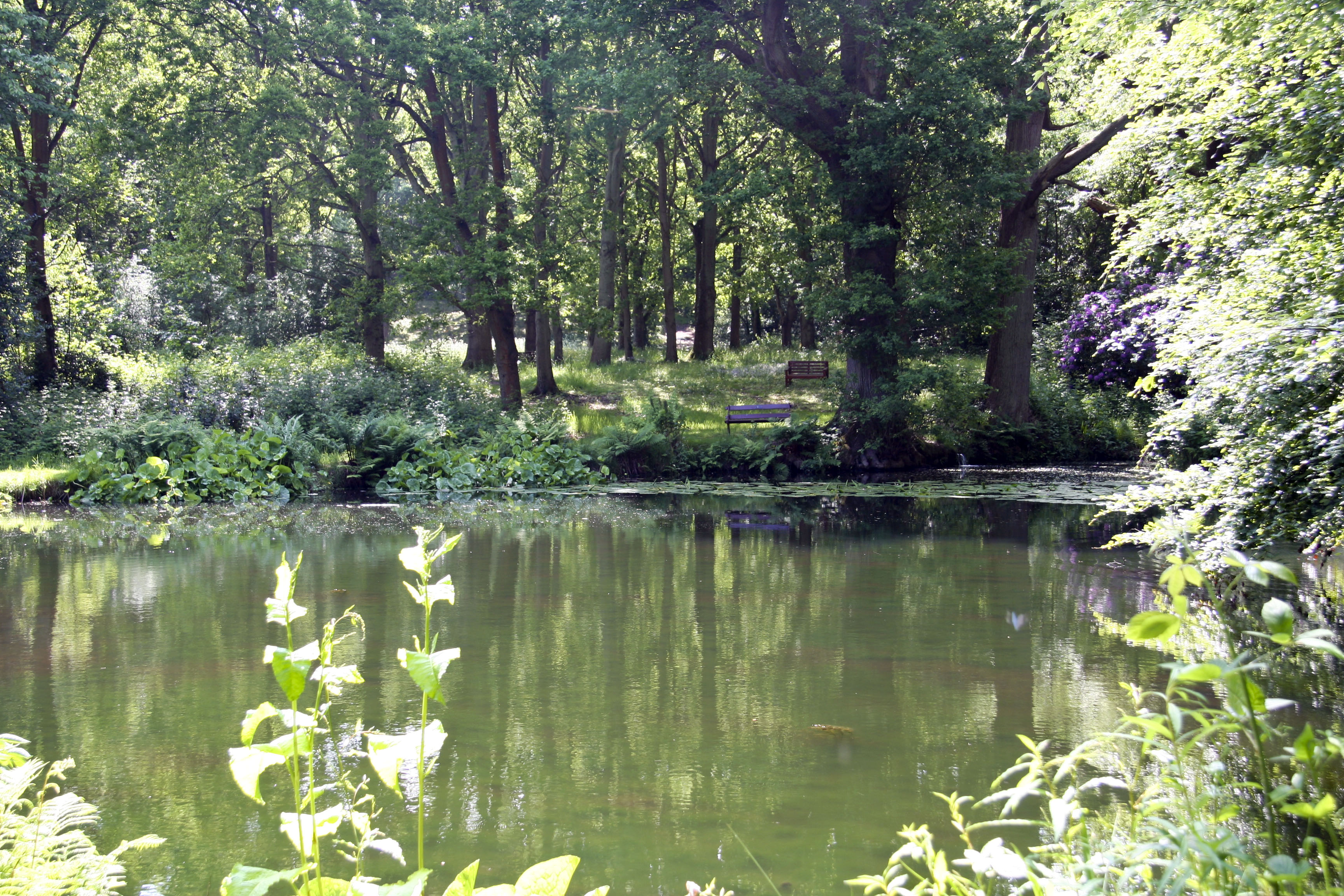
The Lower Pond in June

Great Culverden Park is a small, 4.2ha, woodland, about half a mile from the centre of Tunbridge Wells in Kent, England, west of Mount Ephraim and bounded entirely by houses along Royal Chase, Connaught Way, Knightsbridge Close, Culverden Park and Royal Wells Park. It is not accessible, or visible, from a public place.

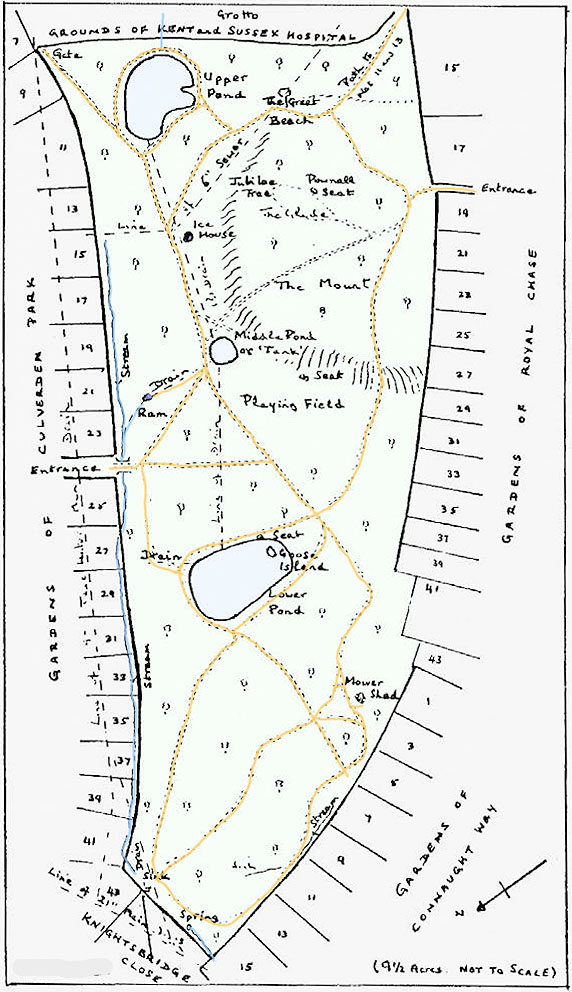
Map of Great Culverden Park

The Park is the remnant grounds of the former Culverden House, designed by Decimus Burton for Jacob Jeddere Fisher in 1830 and built on the highest point in the wood and the first big house to be built there. When Jacob Jeddere Fisher pulled down the old house and built himself another, in 1830, he named it Great Culverden. Great Culverden House was once the residence of Rear Admiral Charles Davis Lucas, VC, who died there in 1914.

The house was demolished to make way for the Kent & Sussex Hospital, which itself was demolished in 2014 to make way for the Royal Wells Park housing development which was completed in 2018.

The Park forms a 'green link' under the Tunbridge Wells Borough Council Green Infrastructure Plan, 2011 that provides a wildlife corridor linking the park, Rusthall Common and other local wildlife sites. The housing development along Mt. Ephraim is required to provide a contiguous Protected Ecology Zone through the development to support this. Great Culverden Park is designated a Site of Local Nature Conservation Value by Tunbridge Wells Borough Council.

Except for an ice house, a hydraulic ram connected to a spring and some other hydraulic works, nothing remains of the house that gave the park its name. The Park is owned by Great Culverden Park Ltd., which may issue shares to properties adjacent the Park.
