= Wateringbury Stream =

Wateringbury Stream known as Bratton Stream in Mereworth

Physical characteristics
- Source
  - location: West Peckham
- Mouth
  - location: River Medway
- Length: 4 miles (6.4 km)

The Wateringbury stream is a tributary of the River Medway in Kent, England. It rises at Swanton, West Peckham parish, flows south east towards Mereworth and then flows in a generally easterly direction to join the River Medway at Wateringbury. It is some four miles (6 km) long and powered a number of watermills.

== Watermills ==
=== Mereworth Mill ===
TQ 673 535 51°15′22″N 0°23′55″E

The Domesday Book records two mills, value 10/-, at Marovrde (Mereworth). The site of the last mill now lies in the private grounds of Mereworth Castle. In 1460, it was held by Thomas Hunte. In 1521 it was a fulling mill, belonging to Sir Thomas Nevyle. In 1772 James Pound was the occupant, followed by his widow in March 1780 and John Pound in September 1780. He was at the mill until October 1791. Thomas Edmead was at the mill from 1792 to 1827. The mill was purchased by Viscount Falmouth c.1856. The mill was demolished by 1907 and the site is today marked by a waterfall at the eastern end of the lakes in the grounds of Mereworth Castle. The head would have been some 8 feet (2.44 m) or 10 feet (3.05 m), suggesting a high breast shot or overshot waterwheel.

=== Mill at Wateringbury ===
The Domesday Book records three mills at Otringeberge (Wateringbury). Two mills were held by Ralf, son of Turald and valued at 3/-, a third was held by Hugh de Braibourne and worth 16d.

This mill was marked on C & G Greenwood's map of Kent, 1822. It was not mentioned in a survey of the parish carried out in 1828.

=== Brattle (Upper) Mill, Wateringbury ===
TQ 686 534 51°15′17″N 0°25′02″E

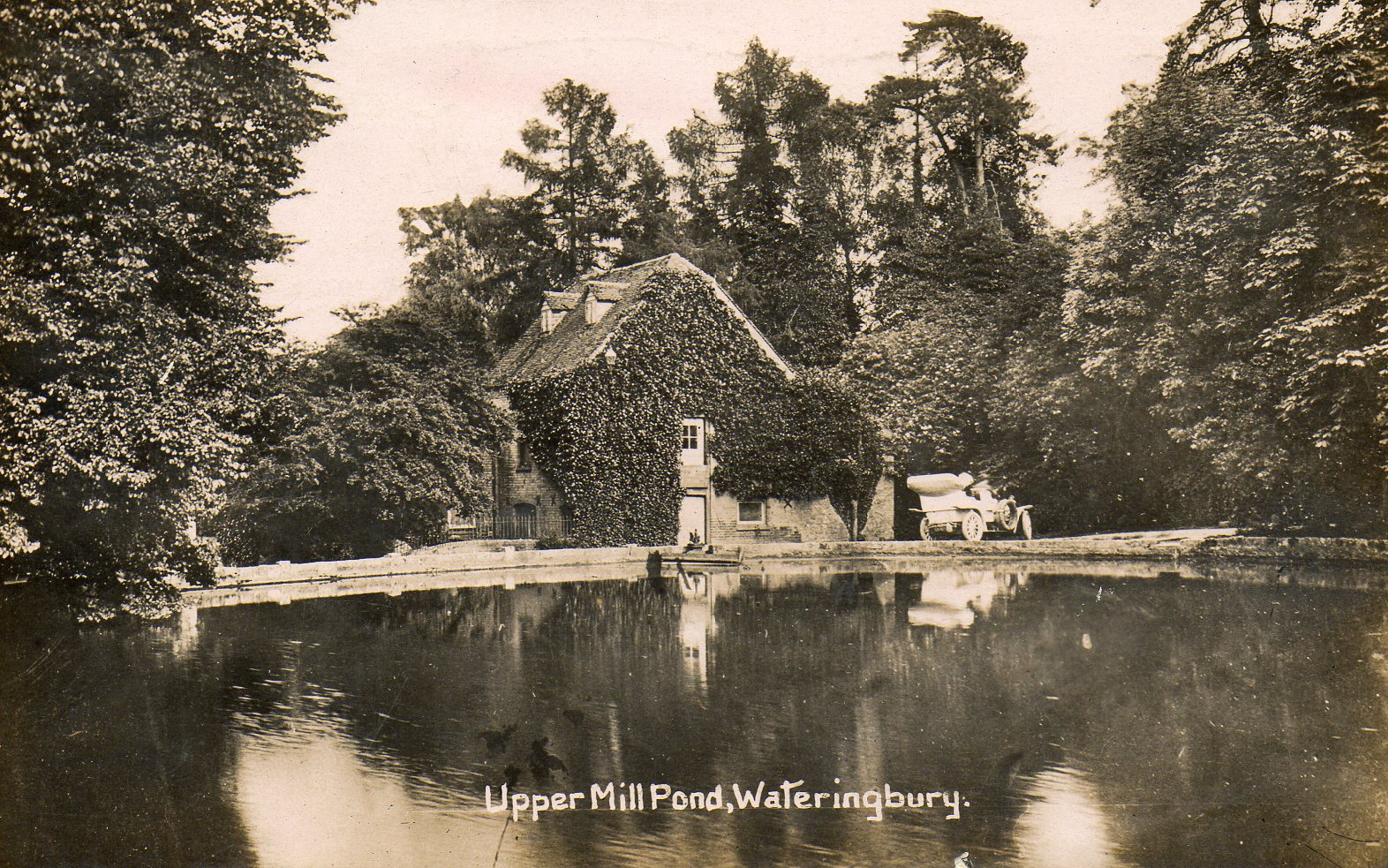
Brattle mill c.1910

Brattle Mill was a corn mill. It was named after a miller, Robert Brattle. It was first mentioned in 1783 and was owned by Robert Brattle. In 1838 the mill was owned by Harry Blaker and occupied by William Mills. Harry Blaker died c.1848 and the mill was run for a short time by his widow, Sarah. James Fremlin took over the lease of the mill by 1851, also running Warden Mill. He purchased the mill from Sarah Blaker c.1868. The miller at this time being Alfred Bloorman. The original overshot waterwheel was of wood. It was replaced by a turbine c.1910 and it was about this time the mill was last used for milling, then being used to generate electricity. Brattle Mill was sometimes known as Upper Mill. A 15 feet 6 inches (4.72 m) diameter by 6 feet (1.83 m) wide cast iron overshot waterwheel from Lower Mill, Polegate, Sussex, was reconstructed at the mill in the early 1980s and the owner intended to reconstruct the machinery to return the building to a working mill. The mill originally worked three pairs of millstones and is a Grade II listed building.

=== Warden Mill, Wateringbury ===
TQ 690 532 51°15′10″N 0°25′22″E

Warden Mill was a corn mill that took its name from the farm to which it belonged, Warden Farm. The first reference to this mill was in November 1822, when John Savage of Cobham leased the mill from John Selby of Marden and John Fellow of Eynsford. In October 1829 James Fremlin took over the lease. Selby and Fellow(s) held the freehold of the mill until October 1838. In 1839 the area of the mill pond was given as ¾ acre. Charles Whittaker was the owner of the mill in 1842 and by April 1845 Whittaker and Fremlin were joint owners, but by November 1847 the mill had passed back to John Selby. James Fremlin purchased a moiety of the property in October 1871. He purchased the other share in the property in December 1876. Richard Clemetson took over the mill between 1878 and 1887, followed by William James Hawes sometime between 1890 and 1895. The mill last worked in 1913 and was demolished c.1914. The head of water was some 8 feet (2.44 m). It is thought that this mill had a breast shot waterwheel.

== Possible water power site ==
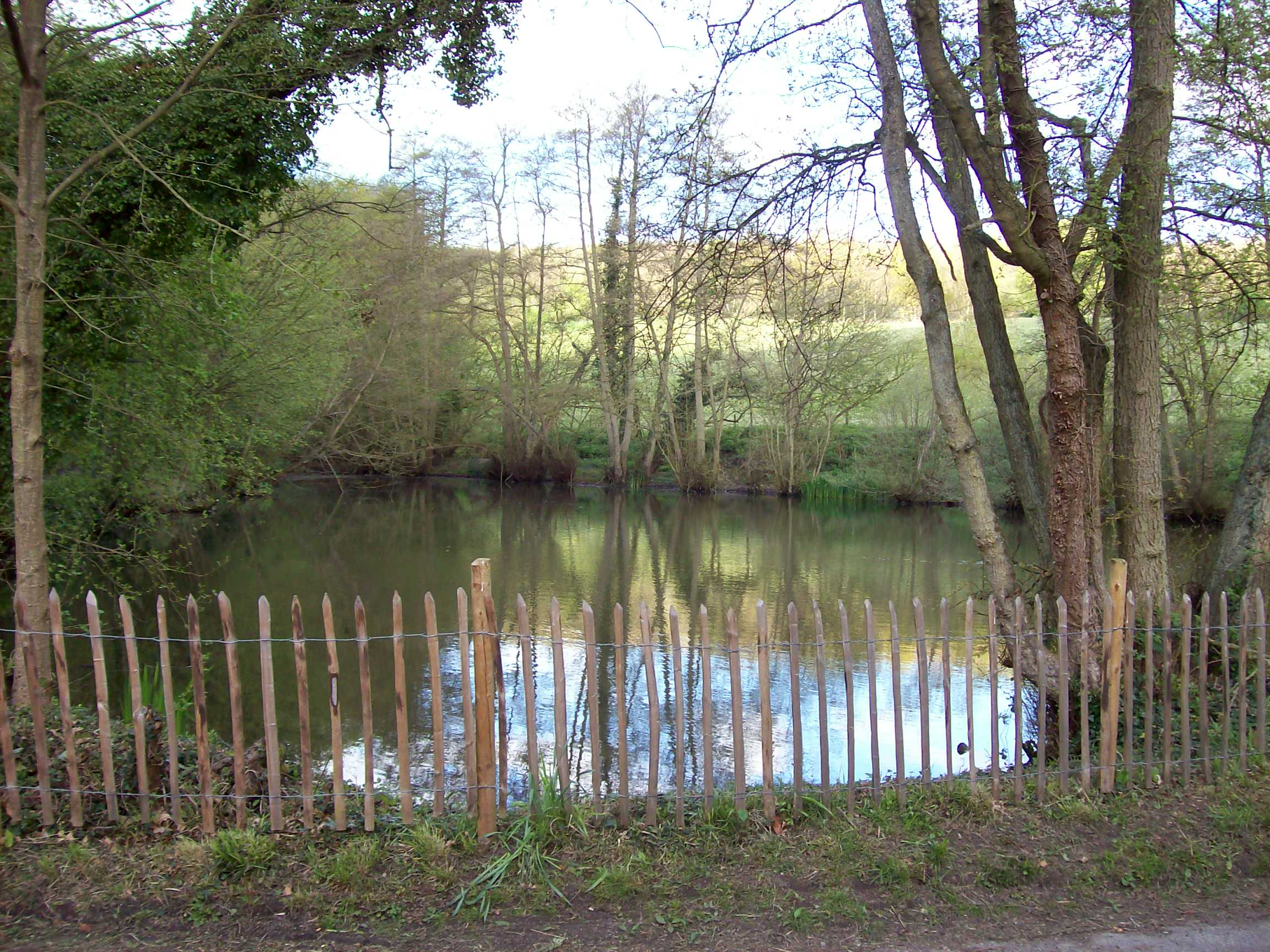
Swanton Valley pond

A site close to the source of the Wateringbury Stream shows some characteristic signs of previous use of waterpower.

=== Swanton, Mereworth ===
TQ 646 539 51°15′37″N 0°21′36″E

A large pond high in the Swanton valley may indicate the site of an old furnace mill, the head available being sufficient to power a large overshot waterwheel.

== Holy well ==
TQ 676 532 51°15′14″N 0°22′27″E

The Wateringbury Stream flows past a group of cottages in Pizien Well Road, Wateringbury. It is sometimes said that the name Pizien may be a corruption of 'poison', however it could also have its origins in the French language because in French entomology, 'piz' means breast and 'ien' means 'from' hence 'from the breast'. This latter explanation could tie up with local superstition that says a bride would drink the water from the well to ensure fertility - perhaps a belief that a bride would be drinking from the breast of the earth, originating from Norman times.

== Ford ==
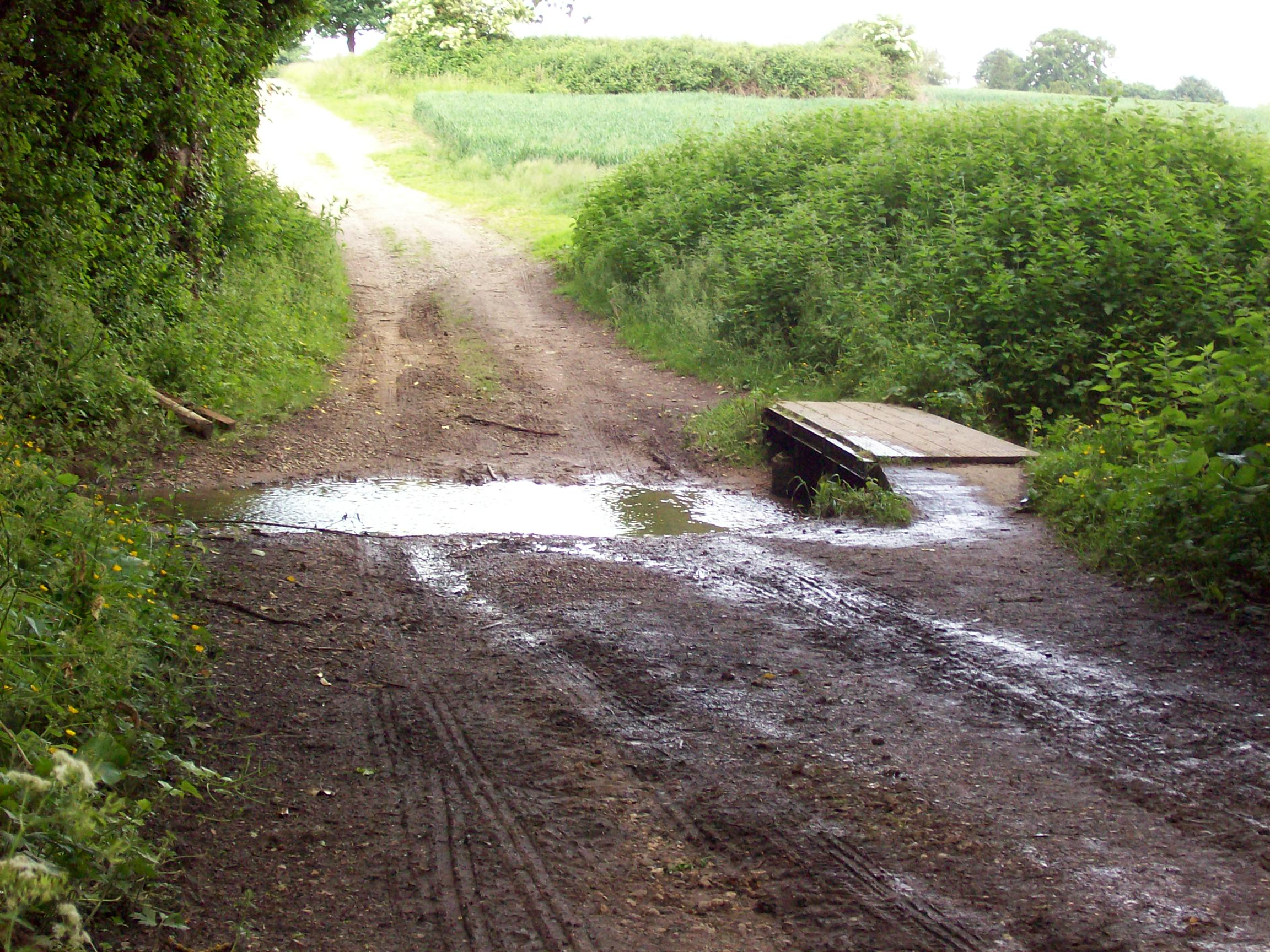
The ford

A track crosses the Wateringbury Stream by means of a ford at TQ 680 531. 51°15′08″N 0°24′30″E

== See also ==
Medway watermills (lower tributaries) article
