= Charles Lucas (Royal Navy officer) =

Royal Navy officer (1834–1914)

Rear-Admiral Charles Lucas VC
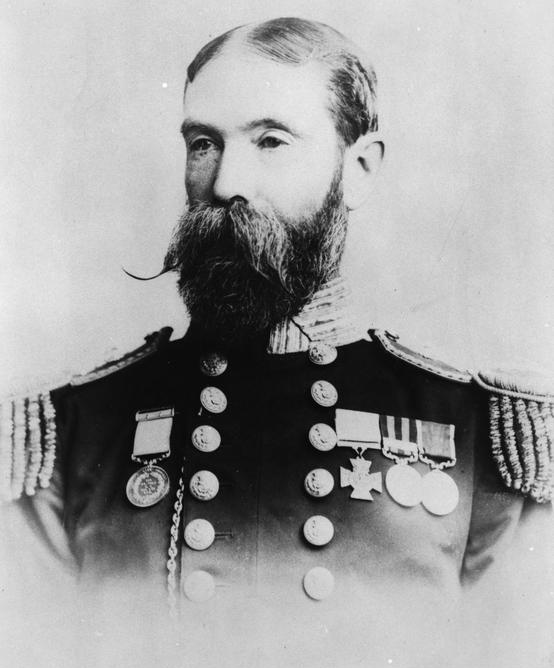
- Born: 19 February 1834; Druminargal House, County Armagh, Ireland
- Died: 7 August 1914 (aged 80); Great Culverden, Kent
- Burial place: St Lawrence's Church, Mereworth
- Military career
- Allegiance: United Kingdom
- Branch: Royal Navy
- Service years: 1848–1873
- Rank: Rear-Admiral
- Units: HMS Hecla
- Commands: HMS Vixen
- Conflicts: Crimean War; Second Anglo-Burmese War
- Awards: Victoria Cross; Royal Humane Society Lifesaving Medal

Rear-Admiral Charles Davis Lucas VC (19 February 1834 – 7 August 1914) was a Royal Navy officer whose act of gallantry in 1854 was the first to lead to the award of a Victoria Cross, the highest British award for gallantry in the face of the enemy. (Note: The first Victoria Cross recipient to be gazetted was Lieutenant Cecil William Buckley, in the London Gazette of 24 February 1857, for his actions in the Sea of Azov on 28 May 1855. The first recipient to physically receive his award was, because of the seniority of his rank, Commander Henry James Raby, at the inaugural awards ceremony on 26 June 1857. Lucas was fourth in line at the investiture. His actions, occurring on 21 June 1854, were the earliest conduct to result in the award of the Victoria Cross.) He reached the rank of rear admiral during his time in the navy.

== Details ==
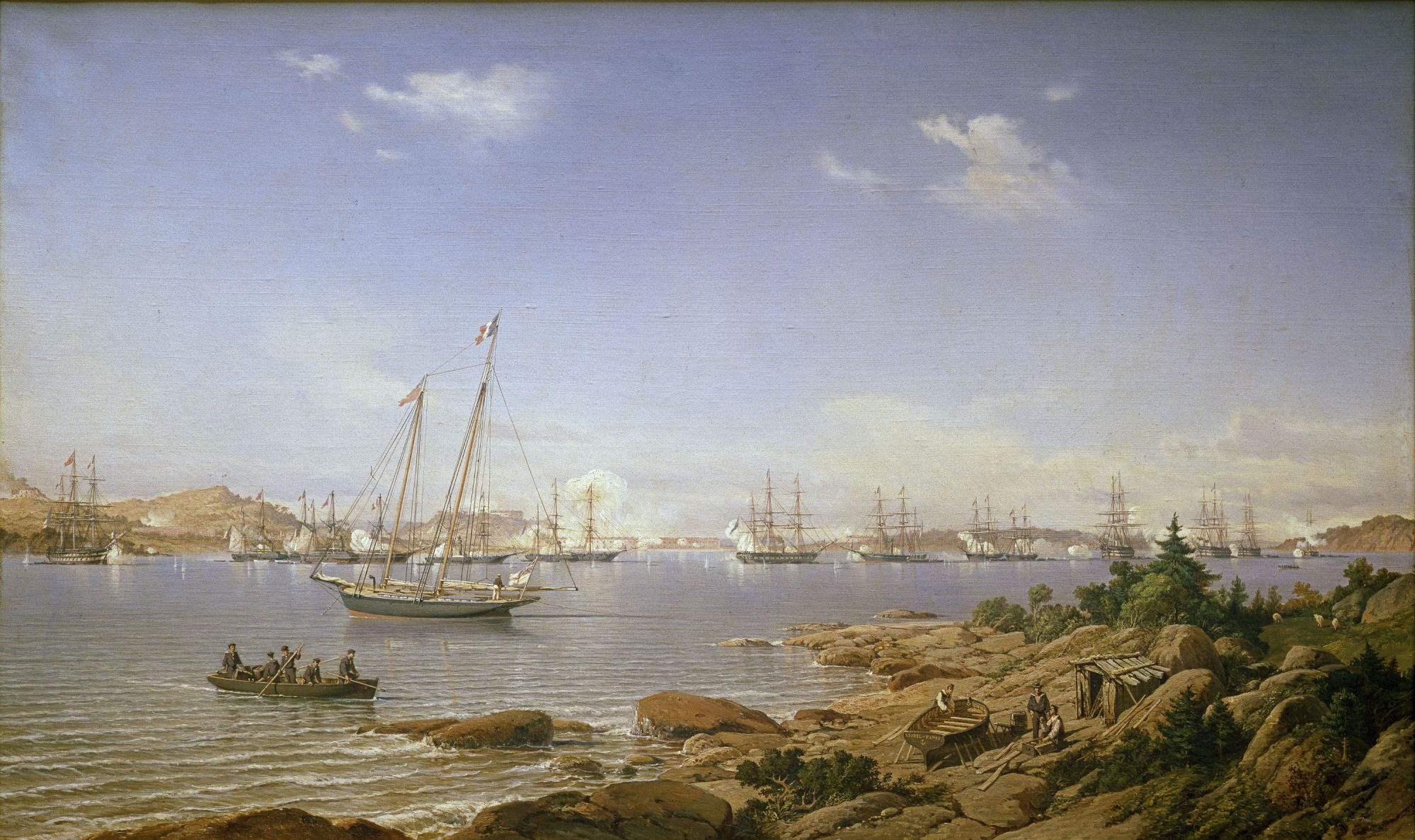
The battle of Bomarsund during the Åland War, June 1854

Lucas was born on 19 February 1834 at Druminargal House (close to Scarva and Poyntzpass) in County Armagh. He enlisted in the Royal Navy in 1848 at age 13 as a naval cadet, served aboard HMS Vengeance, and saw action in the Second Anglo-Burmese War of 1852–53 aboard the frigate Fox at Rangoon, Pegu, and Dalla. By age 20, he had become a mate. For his gallantry during the Battle of Bomarsund of the Crimean War, he was awarded the Victoria Cross for the following deed:

On 21 June 1854 in the Baltic, HMS Hecla, with two other ships, was bombarding Bomarsund, a fort in Åland off Finland. The fire was returned from the fort, and at the height of the action a live shell landed on Hecla's upper deck, with its fuse still hissing. All hands were ordered to fling themselves flat on the deck, but Lucas with great presence of mind ran forward and hurled the shell into the sea, where it exploded with a tremendous roar before it hit the water. Thanks to Lucas's action no one on board was killed or seriously wounded by the shell, and accordingly he was immediately promoted to lieutenant by his commanding officer.

Lucas was personally presented with the Victoria Cross by Queen Victoria at the first VC investiture held at Hyde Park, London, on 26 June 1857.

== Later life ==
His act of bravery in Hecla was the first to be rewarded with the Victoria Cross. His later career included service on Calcutta, Powerful, Cressy, Edinburgh, Liffey and Indus. He was promoted to commander in 1862 and commanded the experimental armoured gunboat Vixen in 1867. He was promoted to captain in 1867, before retiring on 1 October 1873. He was later promoted to rear-admiral on the retired list in 1885. During his career he received the India General Service Medal with the bar Pegu 1852, the Baltic Medal 1854–55, and the Royal Humane Society Lifesaving Medal.

In 1879 he married Frances Russell Hall, daughter of Admiral William Hutcheon Hall, who had been captain of Hecla in 1854. The couple had three daughters together. Lucas served for a time as Justice of the Peace for both Kent and Argyllshire, and died in Great Culverden, Kent on 7 August 1914. He is buried at St Lawrence's Church Mereworth, Maidstone, Kent.

== Medals ==
Lucas's campaign medals, including his Victoria Cross, are displayed at the National Maritime Museum in Greenwich, London. They are not the original medals, which were left on a train and never recovered. Replacement copies were made, though the reverse of the Victoria Cross copy is uninscribed.
