= Christopher Hatton, 1st Baron Hatton =

English aristocrat and politician

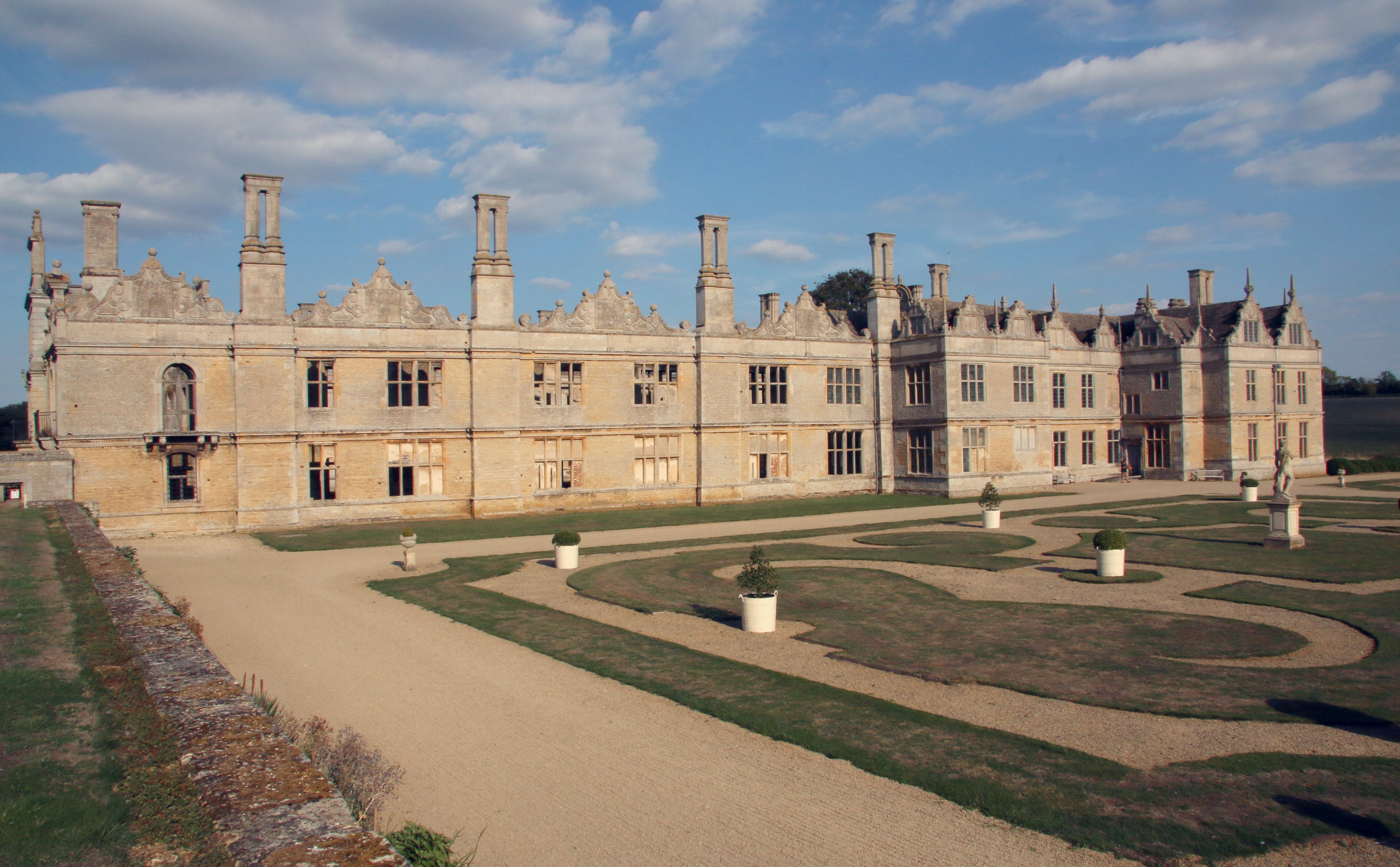
Kirby Hall, Northamptonshire

Christopher Hatton, 1st Baron Hatton KB PC FRS (28 June 1605 – 4 July 1670) was first cousin twice removed to the Elizabethan politician, Sir Christopher Hatton and a prominent Royalist during the reign of King Charles I of England.

== Life ==
He was the son of Sir Christopher Hatton of Barking, Essex and Alice Fanshawe, daughter of Thomas Fanshawe; and was educated at Jesus College, Cambridge. He trained for the law at Gray's Inn. He was a noted antiquarian and compiled, together with William Dugdale and others, the "Book of Seals", a volume of 529 medieval charters, of which 240 are reproduced in facsimiles drawn by a highly talented draftsman. The volume was published in 1950, edited by Lewis C. Loyd and Doris Mary Stenton.

Hatton entered Parliament as MP for Peterborough in 1625, though legally too young to sit, and Clitheroe in that of 1626. On reaching the age of 21 in 1626, he was created a Knight of the Bath, as had been his father before him. He was elected a member of the Long Parliament in 1640 for both Higham Ferrers and Castle Rising, choosing to sit for the former where he was High Steward; he was one of the few candidates supported by Queen Henrietta Maria to secure election.

During the Civil War, Hatton was a partisan of Charles I. In 1643 he was created Baron Hatton of Kirby; and, acting as comptroller of the royal household, he represented the king during the negotiations at Uxbridge in 1645. Later he lived for some years in France, and after the Restoration was made a privy counsellor and governor of Guernsey.

From about 1648, he employed George Jeffreys as his steward caring for Kirby, Northamptonshire. Many of Jeffreys's letters are preserved in the Hatton-Finch correspondence; they cover a period of nearly forty years.

In 1663 he became a founding Fellow of the Royal Society.

He died at Kirby, Northamptonshire on 4 July 1670, and was buried in Westminster Abbey.

== Family ==
He married at Hackney, Middlesex, on 8 May 1630, Elizabeth (died 1672), eldest daughter and coheiress of Sir Charles Montagu, of Boughton, Northamptonshire. She died when lightning struck a powder magazine at Castle Cornet, Guernsey. They had two sons: Christopher Hatton, 1st Viscount Hatton and Charles Hatton, who married Elizabeth, daughter of Sir William Scroggs as her second husband – and three daughters.

Parliament of England
Preceded by Sir Francis Fane; Lawrence Whitacre	Member of Parliament for Peterborough; 1625; With: Lawrence Whitacre	Succeeded by Mildmay Fane, Lord Burghersh; Lawrence Whitacre
Preceded by Ralph Assheton; George Kirke	Member of Parliament for Clitheroe; 1626; With: Ralph Assheton	Succeeded by Thomas Jermyn; William Newell
Vacant Parliament suspended since 1629	Member of Parliament for Higham Ferrers; 1640–1643	Succeeded by Edward Harby
Honorary titles
Preceded by The Lord Spencer	Custos Rotulorum of Northamptonshire; 1636–1646	Interregnum
Peerage of England
New creation	Baron Hatton; 1643–1670	Succeeded by Christopher Hatton
