= Listed buildings in Mereworth =

Civil Parish in Kent, England

Mereworth is a village and civil parish in the Tonbridge and Malling district of Kent, England. It contains 35 listed buildings that are recorded in the National Heritage List for England. Of these five are grade I and 30 are grade II.

This list is based on the information retrieved online from Historic England.

== Key ==
Grade	Criteria
I	Buildings that are of exceptional interest
II*	Particularly important buildings of more than special interest
II	Buildings that are of special interest

== Listing ==
Name	Grade	Location	Type	Completed (Note: The date given is the date used by Historic England as significant for the initial building or that of an important part in the structure's description.)	Date designated	Grid ref. (Note: The grid reference is based on the British national grid reference system, sometimes known as OSGB36, used by the Ordnance Survey.) Geo-coordinates	Notes	Entry number (Note: The "List Entry Number" is a unique number assigned to each listed building and scheduled monument by Historic England.)	Image	Wikidata
183, Butchers Lane	II	183, Butchers Lane			19 April 1985	TQ6590054692; 51°16′02″N 0°22′36″E		1070715	Upload Photo	Q26325006
196 and 198, Butchers Lane	II	196 and 198, Butchers Lane			19 April 1985	TQ6599654557; 51°15′58″N 0°22′41″E		1070714	Upload Photo	Q26325002
222 and 224, Butchers Lane	II	222 and 224, Butchers Lane			19 April 1985	TQ6592054702; 51°16′02″N 0°22′37″E		1299504	Upload Photo	Q26586902
Farm Building 20 Yards South West of the Queens Head Public House	II	Butchers Lane			19 April 1985	TQ6593354282; 51°15′49″N 0°22′37″E		1070713	Upload Photo	Q26324998
Herne Cottage	II	103, Butchers Lane			19 April 1985	TQ6595354212; 51°15′46″N 0°22′38″E		1185763	Upload Photo	Q26481063
Holly Cottage	II	Butchers Lane			19 April 1985	TQ6584254747; 51°16′04″N 0°22′33″E		1363024	Upload Photo	Q26644879
Lavender House, Wisteria Lodge and Blossom House	II	133b, Butchers Lane, ME18 5QD	pub		19 April 1985	TQ6594654298; 51°15′49″N 0°22′38″E		1185772	Lavender House, Wisteria Lodge and Blossom House More images	Q26481071
Moorcocks Farmhouse	II	Butchers Lane			19 April 1985	TQ6594954019; 51°15′40″N 0°22′37″E		1363003	Upload Photo	Q26644859
Rose Cottage	II	218, Butchers Lane			19 April 1985	TQ6594054684; 51°16′02″N 0°22′38″E		1363004	Upload Photo	Q26644860
Brewers Hall Farmhouse	II	Maidstone Road			1 August 1952	TQ6619753491; 51°15′23″N 0°22′49″E		1299393	Upload Photo	Q26586800
Childeric Cottage Childeric House	II	Maidstone Road			1 August 1952	TQ6653453754; 51°15′31″N 0°23′07″E		1070681	Upload Photo	Q26324897
Kitchen Garden Wall and the Bothy to the North of Mereworth Castle	II	Maidstone Road			19 April 1985	TQ6705753852; 51°15′34″N 0°23′34″E		1070679	Upload Photo	Q26324891
Lodge on East Side of Drive to Mereworth Castle	II	Maidstone Road			19 April 1985	TQ6697353649; 51°15′27″N 0°23′30″E		1070677	Upload Photo	Q26324884
Lodge on West Side of Drive to Mereworth Castle	II	Maidstone Road			19 April 1985	TQ6692553653; 51°15′27″N 0°23′27″E		1070678	Upload Photo	Q26324887
Mereworth Castle (main Block)	I	Maidstone Road	English country house		1 August 1952	TQ6689553230; 51°15′14″N 0°23′25″E		1070675	Mereworth Castle (main Block) More images	Q956090
Pavilion to the North East of Mereworth Castle	I	Maidstone Road			1 August 1952	TQ6694253276; 51°15′15″N 0°23′27″E		1363025	Upload Photo	Q17530317
Pavilion to the North West and Stables of Mereworth Castle	I	Maidstone Road			1 August 1952	TQ6686253285; 51°15′16″N 0°23′23″E		1070676	Upload Photo	Q17530238
The Bull House	II	Maidstone Road			13 December 1973	TQ6686253671; 51°15′28″N 0°23′24″E		1070680	Upload Photo	Q26324893
The Cross	II	Malling Road			19 April 1985	TQ6617453791; 51°15′33″N 0°22′49″E		1070682	Upload Photo	Q26324900
Barn to the East of Yotes Court	II	Mereworth Road			1 August 1952	TQ6504553344; 51°15′19″N 0°21′50″E		1186075	Upload Photo	Q26481348
The Toll House	II	Mereworth Road			19 April 1985	TQ6533853372; 51°15′20″N 0°22′05″E		1070683	Upload Photo	Q26324903
Yotes Court	I	Mereworth Road	building		19 April 1985	TQ6501553307; 51°15′18″N 0°21′48″E		1363026	Yotes Court More images	Q17530320
Mereworth War Memorial	II	Roadside Near St Lawrence's Church, The Street, ME18 5NA	war memorial		8 August 2018	TQ6596453752; 51°15′32″N 0°22′38″E		1457039	Mereworth War Memorial More images	Q66479704
Libbits Cottages	II	Seven Mile Lane			19 April 1985	TQ6517553833; 51°15′35″N 0°21′57″E		1299371	Upload Photo	Q26586779
137-139, the Street	II	137-139, The Street			19 April 1985	TQ6621553827; 51°15′34″N 0°22′51″E		1070686	Upload Photo	Q26324912
276 and 278, the Street	II	276 and 278, The Street			19 April 1985	TQ6624553787; 51°15′32″N 0°22′52″E		1186225	Upload Photo	Q26481488
91, the Street	II	91, The Street			19 April 1985	TQ6582953684; 51°15′30″N 0°22′31″E		1186095	Upload Photo	Q26481370
95, the Street	II	95, The Street			19 April 1985	TQ6585053708; 51°15′30″N 0°22′32″E		1070685	Upload Photo	Q26324909
Black Lion House	II	The Street			19 April 1985	TQ6578653660; 51°15′29″N 0°22′28″E		1363027	Upload Photo	Q26644880
Church of St Lawrence	I	The Street	church building		25 August 1959	TQ6601853752; 51°15′32″N 0°22′40″E		1186214	Church of St Lawrence More images	Q7593946
Mere House	II	56, The Street, Maidstone, ME18 5NA			19 April 1985	TQ6570153419; 51°15′21″N 0°22′24″E		1070684	Upload Photo	Q26324906
Springfield	II	The Street			19 April 1985	TQ6566753622; 51°15′28″N 0°22′22″E		1186088	Upload Photo	Q26481362
The Malt House	II	The Street			19 April 1985	TQ6605853826; 51°15′34″N 0°22′43″E		1363028	Upload Photo	Q26644881
Barn 20 Yards to the West of Barons Place Farm	II	Willow Wents			19 April 1985	TQ6514054089; 51°15′43″N 0°21′56″E		1363029	Upload Photo	Q26644882
Highlands House	II	121, Willow Wents			19 April 1985	TQ6554754197; 51°15′46″N 0°22′17″E		1070674	Upload Photo	Q26324882

== See also ==
- Grade I listed buildings in Kent
- Grade II* listed buildings in Kent

== Sources ==
- Newman, John (2012) [1969], Kent: West and the Weald, The Buildings of England, New Haven and London: Yale University Press, ISBN 978-0-300-18509-6
