= Walter Fitzwilliam =

English politician

Walter Fitzwilliam was an English politician who sat in the House of Commons from 1621 to 1622.

Fitzwilliam was the son of Sir William Fitzwilliam of Gaynes Park, Essex, and his wife Winifred Mildmay, daughter of Sir Walter Mildmay. He was admitted at Emmanuel College, Cambridge on 29 September 1591. In 1621, he was elected Member of Parliament for Peterborough.

Parliament of England
Preceded by Sir William Walter; Roger Manwood	Member of Parliament for Peterborough; 1621–1622; With: Mildmay Fane	Succeeded by Sir Francis Fane; Laurence Whitaker
