= Mildmay Fane, 2nd Earl of Westmorland =

English nobleman, politician and writer

The Right Honourable The Earl of Westmorland KB
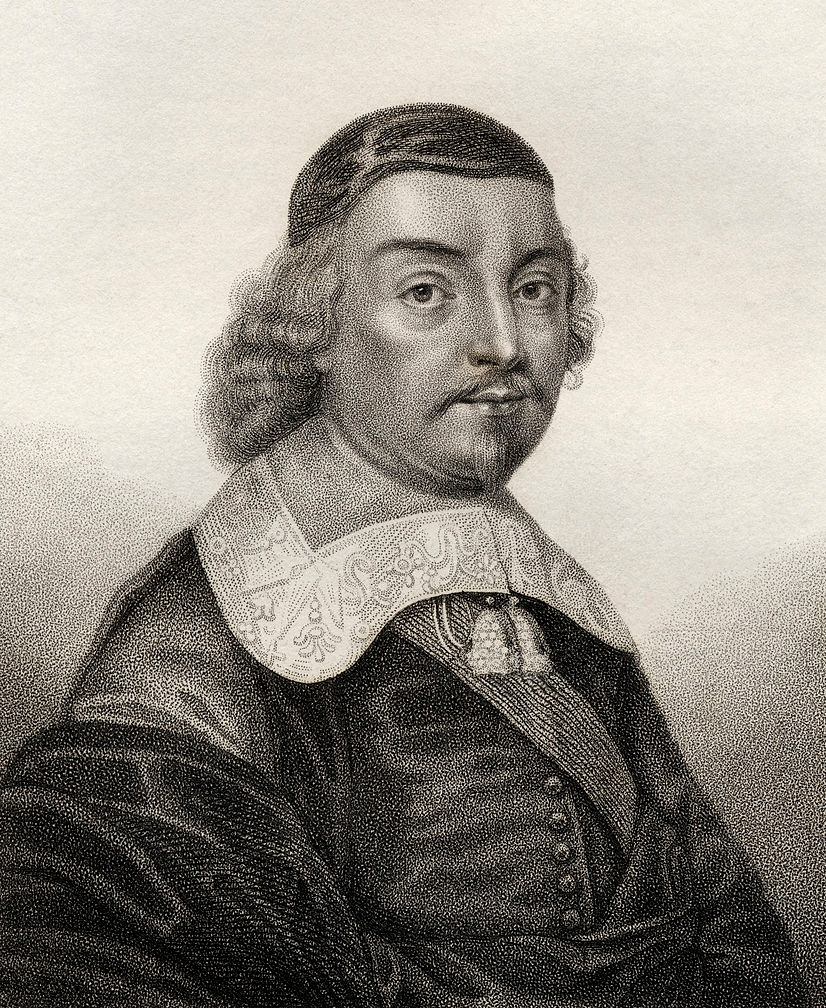

Member of Parliament for Peterborough
- In office 1621–1624 Serving with Walter FitzWilliam
- Monarch: James I
- Preceded by: Edward Wymarke; Sir William Walter
- Succeeded by: Sir Francis Fane; Laurence Whitaker
- In office 1626–1629 Serving with Laurence Whitaker
- Monarch: Charles I
- Preceded by: Laurence Whitaker; Sir Christopher Hatton
- Succeeded by: None (parliament suspended until 1640)

Member of Parliament for Kent
- In office 1625–1625 Serving with Sir Albert Moreton
- Monarch: Charles I
- Preceded by: Sir Nicholas Tufton; Sir Edwin Sandys
- Succeeded by: Sir Edward Hales; Sir Edward Scot

Lord Lieutenant of Northamptonshire
- In office 1660–1666 Serving with The Earl of Exeter
- Monarch: Charles II
- Preceded by: None (English Interregnum)
- Succeeded by: The Earl of Exeter; The Earl of Peterborough

Personal details
- Born: Mildmay Fane; 24 January 1602 Mereworth, Kent, England
- Died: 12 February 1666 (aged 64)
- Spouse(s): Grace Thornhurst (1620–36); Mary Vere (1638–66)
- Children: With Grace Thornhurst; Charles Fane, 3rd Earl of Westmorland; With Mary Vere; Lady Mary Fane; Vere Fane, 4th Earl of Westmorland; Rachael Fane; Catherine Fane; Susan Fane; Elizabeth Fane
- Parent(s): Francis Fane, 1st Earl of Westmorland; Mary Mildmay
- Education: Emmanuel College, Cambridge
- Occupation: Politician, writer
- Awards: Knight of the Bath

Mildmay Fane, 2nd Earl of Westmorland KB (24 January 1602 – 12 February 1666), styled Lord le Despenser between 1624 and 1628, was an English nobleman, politician and writer.

== Life ==
One of seven sons of Francis Fane by his wife Mary Mildmay, granddaughter of Sir Walter Mildmay, Mildmay Fane was born in Kent and educated at Emmanuel College, Cambridge (matriculated 1618). He became MP for Peterborough in 1620 and for Kent in 1625. He succeeded his father as Earl of Westmorland and Lord le Despenser on 23 March 1629.

A friend of Robert Herrick, he supported the Royalist party at the outbreak of the English Civil War (King Charles I had stood as godfather to Fane's eldest son in 1635). Following a brief period of imprisonment by Parliament, however, he retired to his estate at Apethorpe Hall in Northamptonshire.

== Writing ==
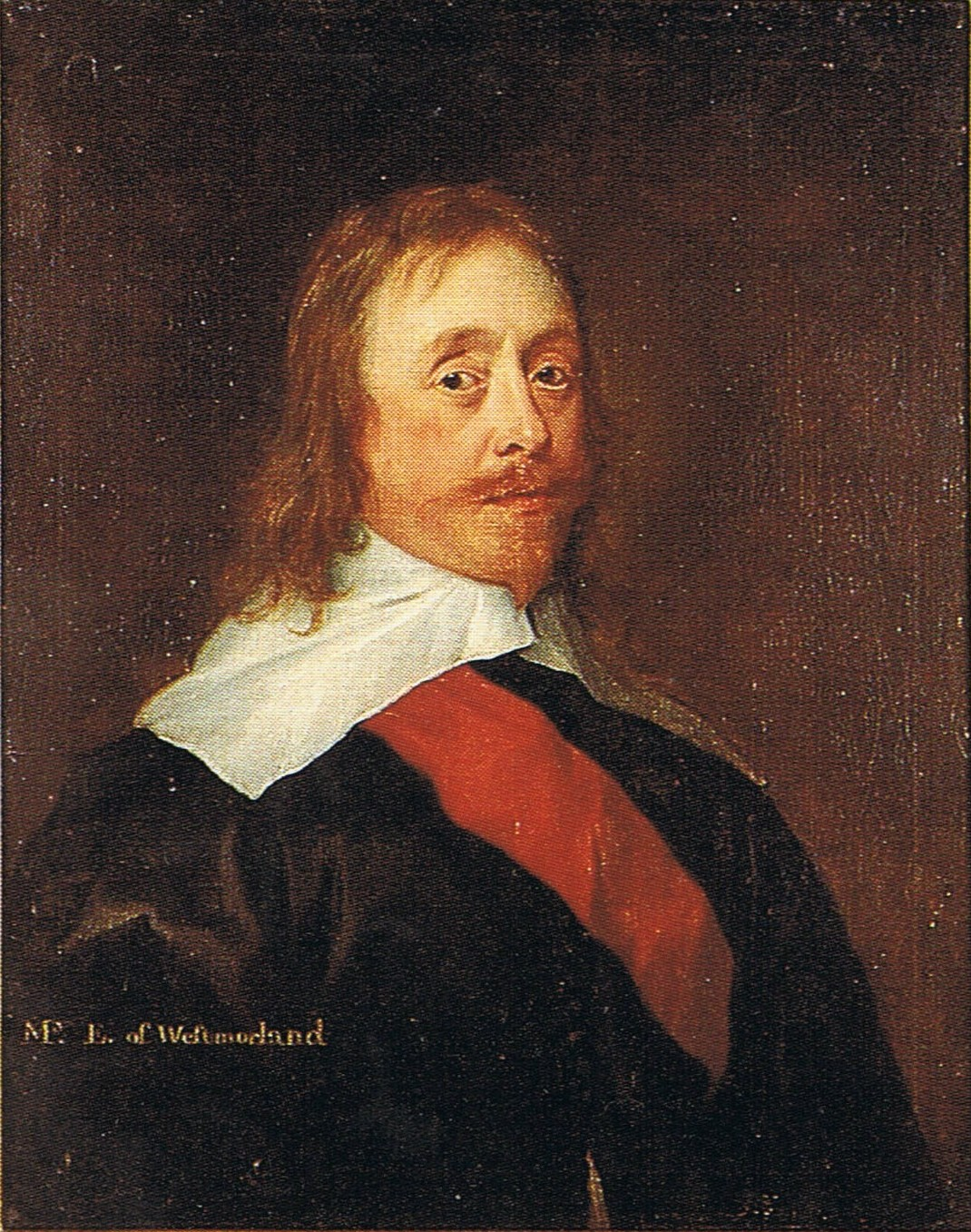
A portrait in oils of Mildmay Fane, wearing the sash of the Order of the Bath

One hundred and thirty-seven poems by Fane appeared in his self-published collection Otia Sacra in 1648—the first time a peer of England published his own verse. It was only at the end of the twentieth century that a larger body of Fane's verse was identified: some 500 poems by Fane, composed between 1621 and 1665, were published in 2001. The poems survived in manuscript collections preserved at Fulbeck Hall in Lincolnshire, Houghton Library at Harvard University, and the Westmorland papers preserved at the Northamptonshire Record Office.

Fane also wrote masques and stage plays; six of these "politicized entertainments" were performed at Apethorpe during the decade of the 1640s by Fane's children and servants. For his 1641 masque Candia Restaurata, Fane designed sets and stage effects and composed some of the music used in the production. Virtue's Triumph features personifications of Ambition and Impudence, Lies and Deceits; Nobility and Learning are married and the parents of Truth. The protagonist of De Pugna Animi is Lord Mens (Mind), who is assisted by figures like Sir Ratio Prudens in resisting a revolt of the five senses. Fane wrote his play The Change during his imprisonment in the Tower of London early in the Civil War. One of his plays, titled Ladrones, was known in manuscript in the 19th century and reportedly featured Sir Francis Drake, Thomas Cavendish, and Ferdinand Magellan as characters; but the MS. has been lost. Fane's total extant literary output includes over 900 poems in English and Latin, and eight plays or entertainments.

== Family ==
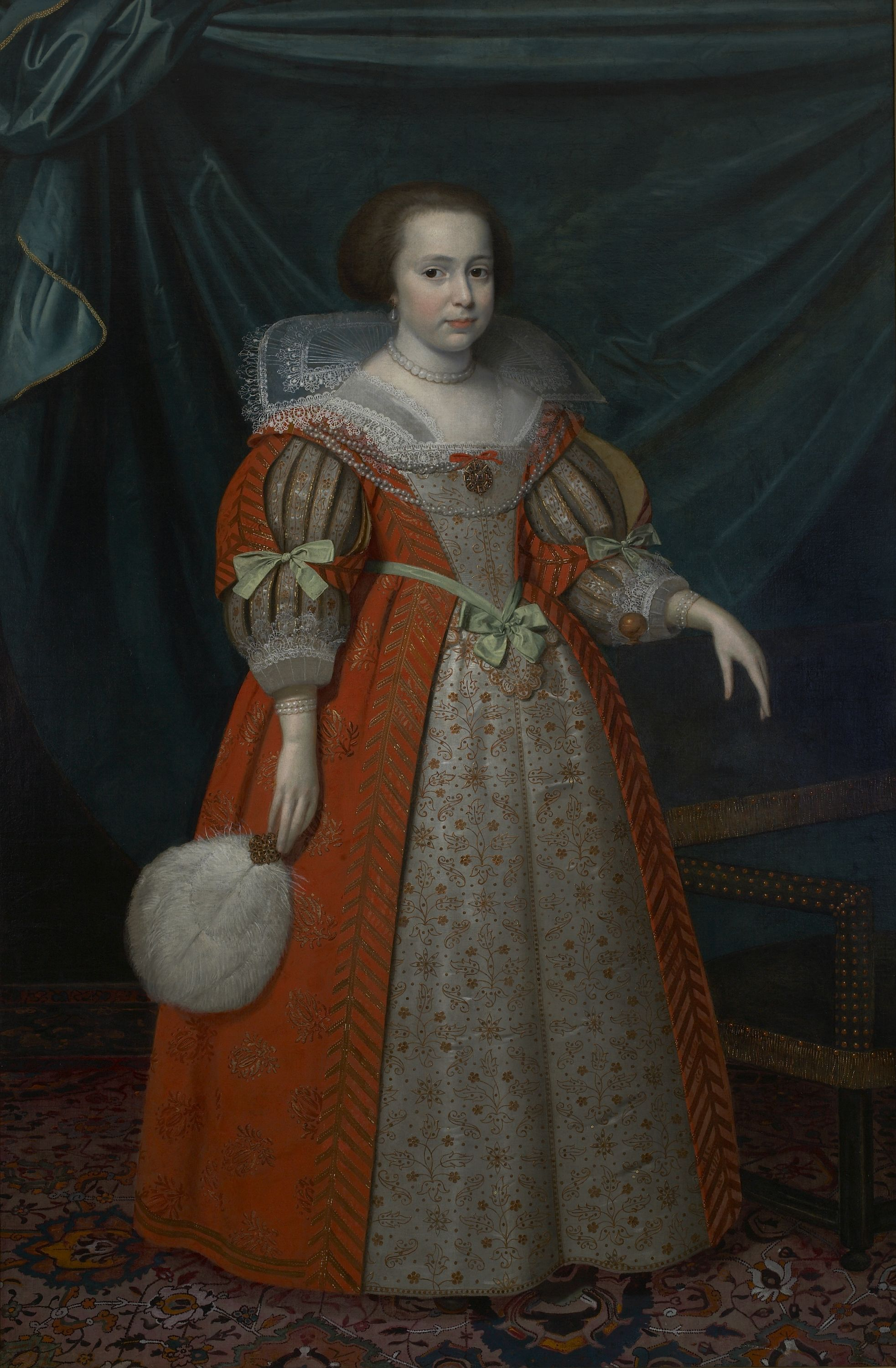
Mary de Vere, Countess of Westmorland

Fane married twice: firstly, in 1620, to Grace Thornhurst, daughter of Sir William Thornhurst of Kent, with whom he had a son and five daughters; and secondly to Mary, daughter of Horace Lord Vere of Tillsbury, who bore him a son and four daughters, one of whom was Lady Mary Fane who married firstly Francis Palmes of Ashwell, Rutland, granddaughter of Sir Guy Palmes, and was widowed with no children. She married secondly John Cecil, 4th Earl of Exeter (1628–1678), a widower, on 24 January 1670. Mildmay's first son Charles, and his second son Vere, both succeeded to their father's title in turn (since Charles Fane, 3rd Earl, left no descendants).

Mildmay Fane's younger brother Sir Francis Fane married Elizabeth West, daughter of William West of Firbeck Hall, Yorkshire, and widow of John, Lord Darcy of the North. Sir Francis Fane achieved some distinction as a writer, publishing poetry as well as three dramatic plays. He was made Knight of the Bath at the Coronation of Charles I, and served as governor of Doncaster Castle during the English civil war. Rachael Fane (1613–1680), one of Mildmay Fane's seven sisters and a resident of Apethorpe Hall, also wrote entertainments and masques that were performed by the household at Apethorpe. Her works survive in manuscript. Another younger brother was the Royalist and MP Colonel the Hon. George Fane.

== Plays and masques ==
- Raguaillo d'Oceano (1640)
- Candia Restaurata ("Candy Restored", 1641)
- Time's Trick Upon the Cards (1642)
- The Change (1642)
- Virtue's Triumph (1644)
- Don Phoebo's Triumph (1645)
- De Pugna Animi (1650)
- Ladrones, or the Robbers' Island (lost)

== Arms ==
Coat of arms of Mildmay Fane, 2nd Earl of Westmorland
Crest Out of a ducal coronet Or, a bull's head Argent pied Sable, armed of the first, charged on the neck with a rose Gules barbed and seeded Proper. Escutcheon Azure three dexter gauntlets backs affrontée Or. Supporters Dexter: a griffin per fesse Argent and Or, gorged with a plain collar and lined Sable; Sinister: a bull Argent pied Sable collared and lined Or, at the end of the line a ring and three staples of the last. Motto "NE VILE FANO" (Disgrace not the altar)

Parliament of England
Preceded by Roger Manwood; Sir William Walter	Member of Parliament for Peterborough; 1621–1624; With: Walter Fitzwilliam	Succeeded by Francis Fane; Laurence Whitacre
Preceded by Sir Nicholas Tufton; Sir Edwin Sandys	Member of Parliament for Kent; 1625; With: Sir Albert Moreton	Succeeded by Sir Edward Hales, 1st Baronet; Sir Edward Scott
Preceded by Laurence Whitacre; Sir Christopher Hatton	Member of Parliament for Peterborough; 1626–1629; With: Laurence Whitacre	Parliament suspended until 1640
Honorary titles
English Interregnum	Lord Lieutenant of Northamptonshire jointly with The Earl of Exeter; 1660–1666	Succeeded by The Earl of Exeter; The Earl of Peterborough
Peerage of England
Preceded by Francis Fane	Earl of Westmorland; 1629–1666	Succeeded by Charles Fane
