= Frances Cecil, Countess of Exeter (died 1669) =

Frances Cecil, Countess of Exeter (2 December 1630 – 2 December 1669), formerly Lady Frances Manners, was the first wife of John Cecil, 4th Earl of Exeter.

She was a daughter of John Manners, 8th Earl of Rutland, and his wife, the former Frances Montagu. The Countess of Exeter's sisters, Margaret, Elizabeth and Dorothy, all became countesses. Another, Anne, became a Viscountess.

She married the earl on 8 December 1646.

Two of their children survived infancy:

- John Cecil, 5th Earl of Exeter (c. 1648–1700)
- Lady Frances Cecil (1652–1694), married John Scudamore, 2nd Viscount Scudamore.

The countess's portrait in miniature was painted in about 1646 (the year of her marriage) by Samuel Cooper, and is held by Burghley House.

Some sources give the date of her death as 1660, but the parish register of St Martin's Church, Stamford, shows her to have been buried in December 1669. A few weeks after her death, the earl married Lady Mary Fane, daughter of Mildmay Fane, 2nd Earl of Westmorland.
