= Laurence Whitaker =

English politician

Laurence Whitaker (c. 1578 – 15 April 1654) of Turnham Green, Chiswick was an English politician who sat in the House of Commons at various times between 1624 and 1653.

== Early life ==
Whitaker was born in Somerset, the son of Laurence Whitaker. He matriculated from St John's College, Cambridge in around 1593 and was awarded BA in 1597 and MA in 1600. He was incorporated at Oxford University in 1603 and admitted at Middle Temple on 24 March 1614.

== Career ==
He was secretary to Sir Edward Philips, Master of the Rolls. He also held a number of minor public offices, including Clerk of the Petty Bag (1611–1614), and served as a justice of the peace for Middlesex.

In 1624 he was elected member of parliament for Peterborough. He was re-elected in 1625, 1626 and 1628 and sat until 1629 when King Charles decided to rule without parliament for eleven years. In 1624 he became clerk extraordinary of the Privy Council and held the post until 1641 when he was imprisoned.

In November 1640, Whitaker was elected MP for Okehampton in the Long Parliament, of which he was a diarist.

== Death ==
He died at the age of 76 and was buried at St Giles in the Fields.

== Marriages ==
He had married twice; firstly Margaret, the daughter of Sir John Egerton and secondly Dorothy, the daughter of Charles Hoskins of Holborn, Middlesex. He had no children and left his Turnham Green house and other assets to his second wife.

Parliament of England
Preceded by Mildmay Fane; Walter Fitzwilliam	Member of Parliament for Peterborough; 1624–1629; With: Sir Francis Fane 1624; Sir Christopher Hatton 1625; Mildmay Fane, Lord Burghersh 1626–1629	Parliament suspended until 1640
Constituency re-enfranchised	Member of Parliament for Okehampton; 1640–1653; With: Edward Thomas 1640–1648	Not represented in Barebones Parliament
