= John Cecil, 4th Earl of Exeter =

English peer

John Cecil, 4th Earl of Exeter (1628 – February 1678), styled Lord Burghley from 1640 to 1643, was an English peer.

He inherited the earldom from his father David Cecil, 3rd Earl of Exeter in 1643.

He was joint Lord Lieutenant of Northamptonshire from 1660 to 1673; after 1673, he held the Lord Lieutenancy for East Northamptonshire while the Earl of Peterborough held the West. From 1660 to 1676 he was Recorder of Stamford, and in November 1660, was granted the office of Keeper of the West Hay, Bailiwick of Cliffe, Rockingham Forest.

He married Lady Frances Manners (c. 1636 – 1660 or 1669), daughter of John Manners, 8th Earl of Rutland, from which marriage there were two surviving children:

- John Cecil, 5th Earl of Exeter (c. 1648–1700)
- Lady Frances Cecil (d. 1694), married John Scudamore, 2nd Viscount Scudamore.

After his first wife's death, he married the widow, Lady Mary Fane, daughter of Mildmay Fane, 2nd Earl of Westmorland.

Honorary titles
English Interregnum	Lord Lieutenant of Northamptonshire; East Northamptonshire only 1673–1678; With: The Earl of Westmorland 1660–1666; The Earl of Peterborough 1666–1673	Succeeded by The Earl of Peterborough
Peerage of England
Preceded by David Cecil	Earl of Exeter; 1643–1678	Succeeded by John Cecil
