= Richard Hosmer =

English cricketer

Richard Hosmer (3 January 1757 – 29 April 1820) was an English cricketer who played mainly for Kent.

Hosmer was born at Mereworth in Kent in 1757. He played in 18 matchesbetween 1780 and 1791 for various Kent and Gentlemen's XIs. He died at Mereworth in 1820.
