= Mereworth Castle =

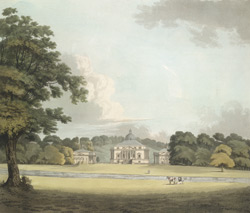
- Mereworth Castle in the 18th century

- Location within Kent

General information
- Type: Country house
- Architectural style: Palladian
- Classification: Grade I listed
- Location: Mereworth, Kent
- Coordinates: 51°15′14″N 0°23′25″E
- Construction started: 1723
- Completed: 1725
- Owner: Mahdi Al-Tajir

Design and construction
- Architect: Colen Campbell

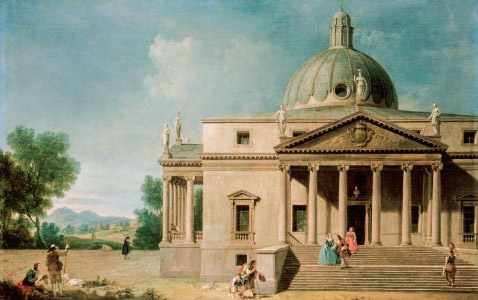
Capriccio with a view of Mereworth Castle. Francesco Zuccarelli and Antonio Visentini, 1746.

Mereworth Castle is a grade I listed Palladian country house in Mereworth, Kent, England.

== History ==
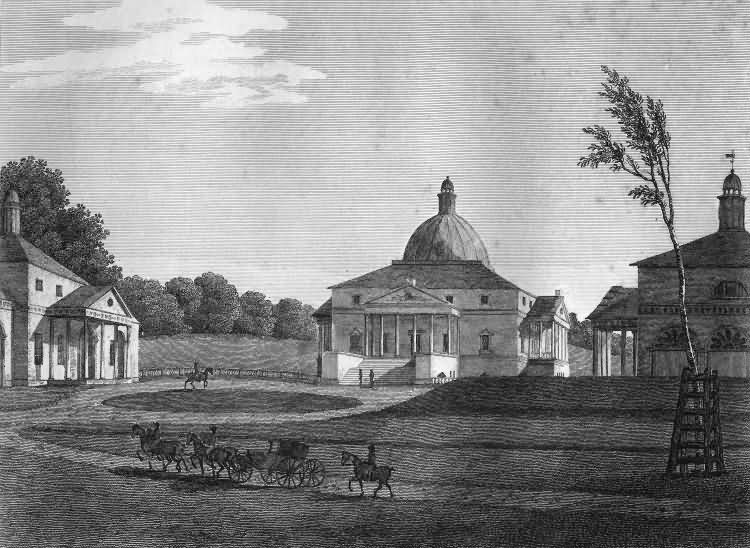
Mereworth by Paul Amsinck, engraved by Letitia Byrne, 1809.

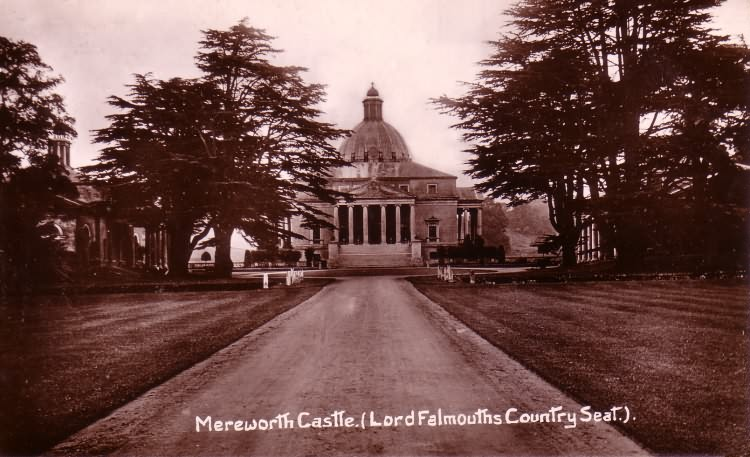
Mereworth Castle, a postcard franked 1911.

Originally the site of a fortified manor house with licence to crenellate in 1332, the manor of Mereworth was inherited by Francis Fane, 1st Earl of Westmorland (1580-1629) (son and heir of Sir Thomas Fane (died 1589) of Badsell in the parish of Tudeley in Kent) from his mother Mary Neville, suo jure Baroness le Despenser (c. 1554–1626), sole daughter and heiress of Henry Nevill, 6th Baron Bergavenny (died 1587). The present building is not actually a castle, but was built in the 1720s by John Fane, 7th Earl of Westmorland to the 1723 design of the architect Colen Campbell being an almost exact copy of Palladio's Villa Rotunda near Venice. The interior features plasterwork by Giovanni Bagutti and fresco painting by Francesco Sleter. The house is situated in a landscaped park and valley with a number of surrounding pavilions and lodges which are also Grade I listed.

The house passed through descent to Barons Oranmore and Browne (Anglo-Irish Peers, the 3rd Lord Oranmore and Browne became also Baron Mereworth in 1926 and since then the titles are united) whose family seat it became. It was sold in 1930 and used as a prisoner of war camp during World War II. In the 1950s and 1960s it was owned by artist Michael Lambert Tree (1921–1999), a son of Ronald Tree and an heir to the Marshall Field mercantile fortune, and his wife, Lady Anne Cavendish, daughter of the 10th Duke of Devonshire. Tree inherited the house from his uncle, Peter Beatty, who died on 26 October 1949.

The Wateringbury Stream passes through the grounds of the castle. It powered a fulling mill at the eastern end of the castle grounds.

Mereworth Castle is owned by Mahdi Al-Tajir, the former United Arab Emirates ambassador to the United Kingdom and owner of the Highland Spring bottled water company, who purchased it in 1976 for $1.2 million. It is not generally accessible to the public, but does open on rare occasions for guided tours.

== See also ==
- Evelyn Boscawen, 6th Viscount Falmouth

== Sources ==
- Stutchbury, Howard, The Architecture of Colin Campbell, Harvard University Press, 1967, 54–58. ISBN 0-674-04400-2
- Harris, John, The Palladians, Trefoil Publications Ltd, 1981, 66–67. ISBN 0-86294-000-1
- Country Life, XLVII, 808,876,912; XCV, 242; CIV,728; CXVI, 209
- Fuller, Michael (1980). The Watermills of the East Malling and Wateringbury Streams. Maidstone: Christine Swift.
- Fuller & Spain (1986). Watermills (Kent and the Borders of Sussex). Maidstone: Kent Archaeological Society. p. 134. ISBN 0-906746-08-6.
