= Lady Mary Fane =

Daughter of Mildmay Fane, 2nd Earl of Westmorland (1639–1681)

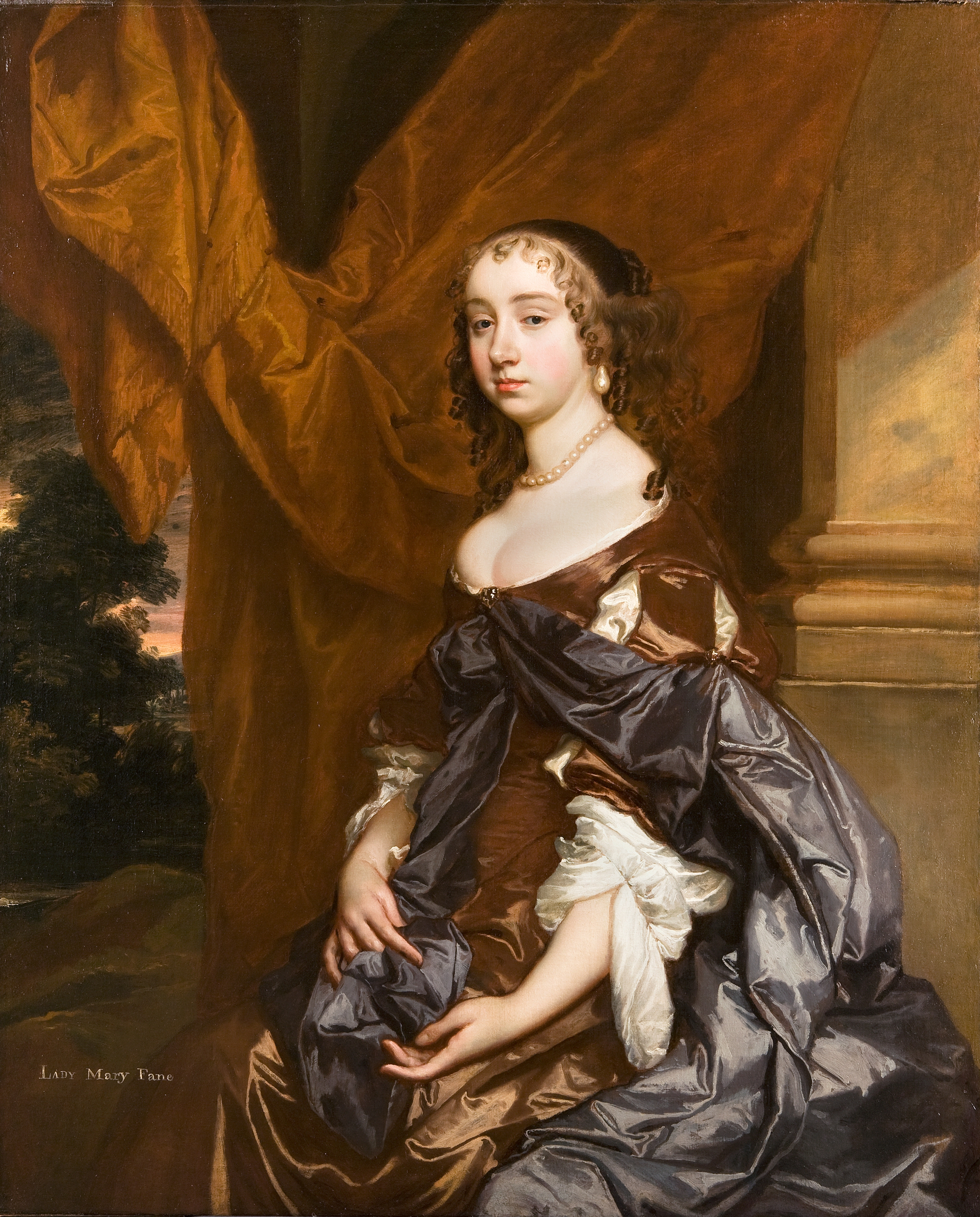
Lady Mary, Mrs Francis Palmes by Sir Peter Lely.

Lady Mary Fane (1639–1681) was the daughter of Mildmay Fane, 2nd Earl of Westmorland, who succeeded to the title in 1628 and died in 1666, and his second wife, Mary, daughter of Horace Vere, 1st Baron Vere of Tilbury, and widow of Sir Roger Townshend.

Lady Mary married firstly Francis Palmes of Ashwell, Rutland, and was widowed with no children. She married secondly John Cecil, 4th Earl of Exeter (1628–1678), a widower, on 24 January 1670. He had previously been married to Lady Frances Manners (died 1660), and had two children. Mary is buried in St Martin's Church, Stamford.
