= Francis Fane, 1st Earl of Westmorland =

English landowner and politician

The Earl of Westmorland
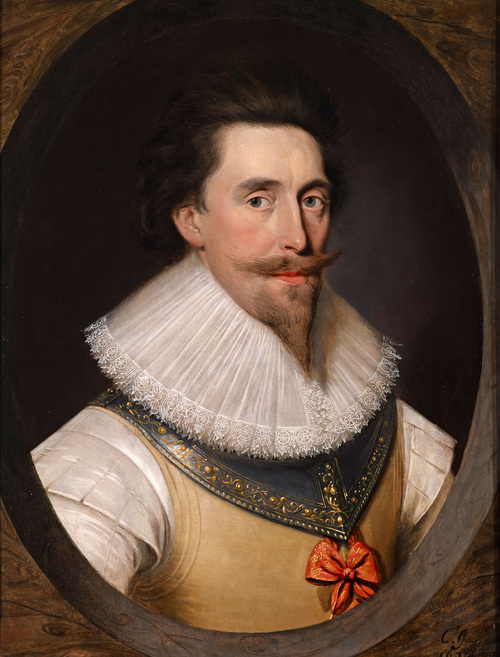
- Francis Fane, first Earl of Westmorland, portrait by Cornelius Johnson (1593–1661)

Member of Parliament for Kent
- In office 1601–1601 Serving with Sir Henry Nevill
- Monarch: Elizabeth I
- Preceded by: Sir Robert Sidney; Percival Hart
- Succeeded by: Sir John Scott; John Leveson

Member of Parliament for Maidstone
- In office 1604–1611 Serving with Laurence Washington
- Monarch: James I
- Preceded by: Sir Thomas Fludd
- Succeeded by: Himself; Sir John Scott
- In office 1614–1614 Serving with Sir John Scott
- Monarch: James I
- Preceded by: Himself; Sir Thomas Fludd
- Succeeded by: Himself; Sir Francis Barnham
- In office 1621–1622 Serving with Sir Francis Barnham
- Monarch: James I
- Preceded by: Himself; Sir John Scott
- Succeeded by: Sir George Fane; Thomas Stanley

Member of Parliament for Peterborough
- In office 1624–1624 Serving with Laurence Whitaker
- Monarch: James I
- Preceded by: Mildmay Fane; Walter Fitzwilliam
- Succeeded by: Sir Christopher Hatton; Laurence Whitaker

Personal details
- Born: Francis Fane; February 1579
- Died: 23 March 1629 (aged 50)
- Resting place: Apethorpe Church, Apethorpe, Northamptonshire, England; 52.5472°N 0.4922°E
- Spouse: Mary Mildmay (1599-1628)
- Children: Mildmay Fane, 2nd Earl of Westmorland; Sir Francis Fane; George Fane; Rachel Fane more
- Parent(s): Sir Thomas Fane; Mary Neville, 3rd Baroness le Despencer

Francis Fane, 1st Earl of Westmorland (1 February 1580 – 23 March 1629), KB (styled Sir Francis Fane between 1603 and 1624) of Mereworth in Kent and of Apethorpe in Northamptonshire was an English landowner and politician who sat in the House of Commons between 1601 and 1624 and then was raised to the Peerage as Earl of Westmorland.

== Origins ==
He was the eldest surviving son and heir of Sir Thomas Fane (died 1589) of Badsell in the parish of Tudeley in Kent, by his second wife Mary Neville, suo jure Baroness le Despenser (c. 1554–1626), heiress of Mereworth in Kent, sole daughter and heiress of Henry Nevill, 6th Baron Bergavenny (died 1587) (a descendant of Ralph Neville, 1st Earl of Westmorland (c.1364-1425)) by his wife, Lady Frances Manners, 3rd daughter of Thomas Manners, 1st Earl of Rutland.

The earliest proven recorded ancestor of the Fane family of Kent is "Henry a Vane" (d. 1456/57) of Tonbridge, Kent, thrice-great-grandfather of Francis Fane, 1st Earl of Westmorland. According to The Complete Peerage "the long line of Welsh descent, as given in the Heraldic Visitation of Kent 1574, is spurious". His younger brother was George Fane of Burston.

== Career ==
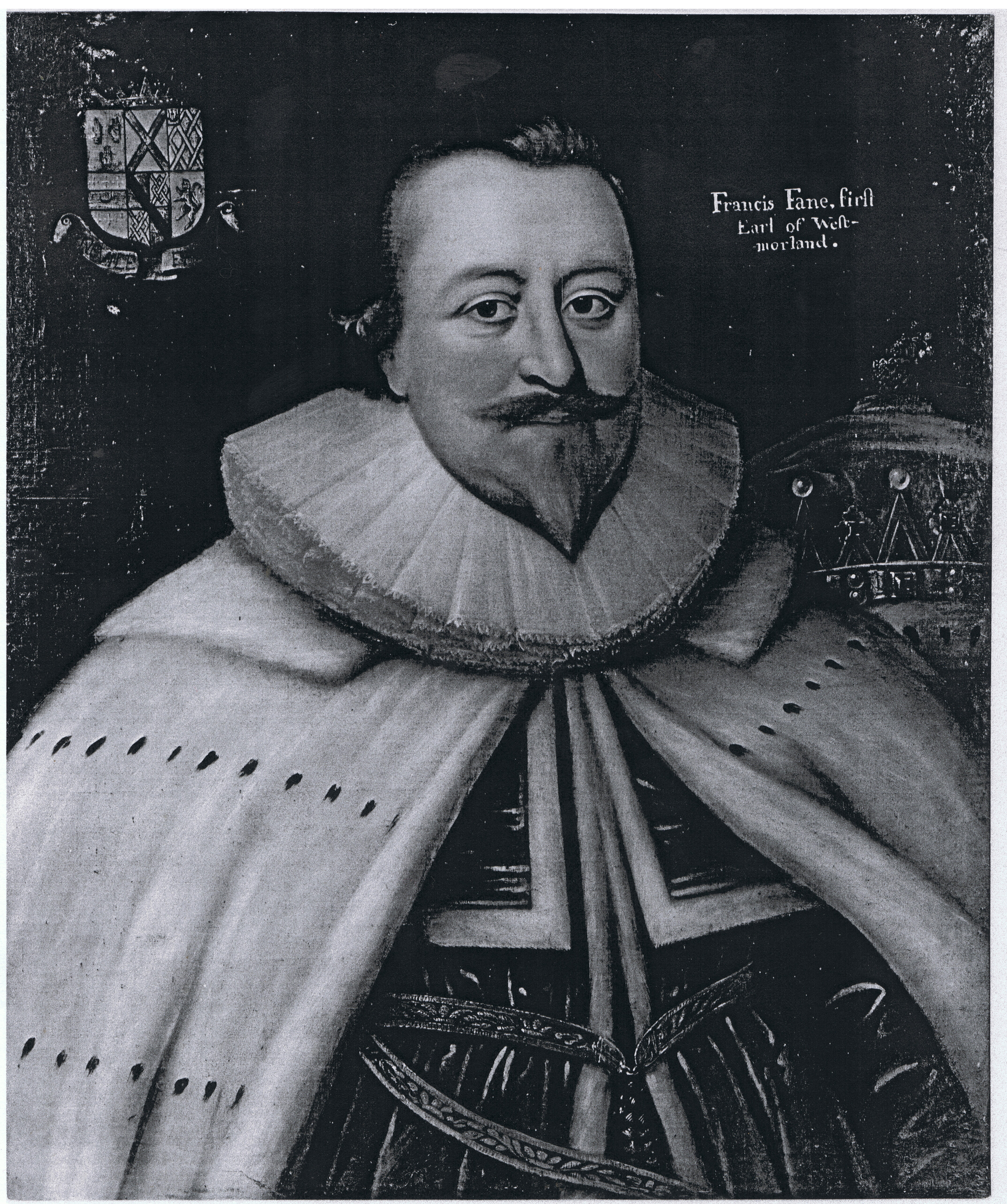
Francis Fane, in coronation robes as worn 2 February 1625 or 26.

Fane was educated at Maidstone Grammar School in Kent and in about 1595 matriculated at Queens' College, Cambridge. He was admitted to Lincoln's Inn on 19 November 1597, for training as a lawyer.

In 1601, with the support of his near neighbour Henry Brooke, 11th Baron Cobham, lord of the Manor of Cobham, Kent, Fane was returned as a Member of Parliament for Kent. He was created a Knight of the Bath at the Coronation of King James I on 25 July 1603, listed nineteenth.

After Cobham's disgrace, Fane was elected as a Member of Parliament for Maidstone in 1604. He was re-elected MP for Maidstone in 1614 and in 1621. In 1624, he was elected MP for Peterborough, Northamptonshire, near his wife's home at Apethorpe. On 29 December 1624, he was created Baron Burghersh "in the County of Sussex", and Earl of Westmorland (1008th on the roll). On his mother's death on 28 June 1626, he succeeded her as 4th Baron le Despenser, and as de jure 8th and 6th Baron Bergavenny.

== Marriage and children ==
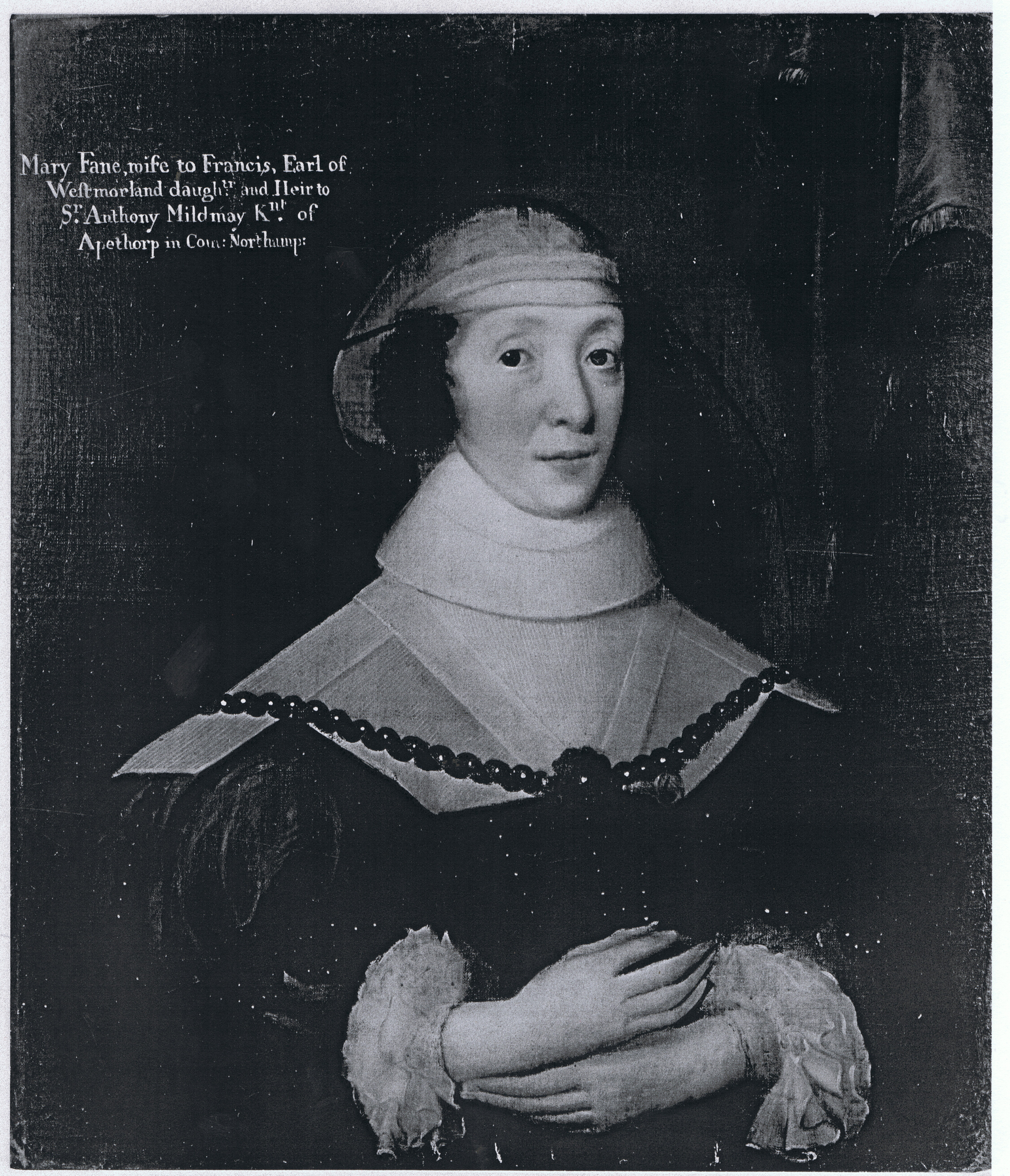
Fane's wife, Mary Mildmay, Countess of Westmorland.

On 15 February 1598/99 Fane married Mary Mildmay (died 9 April 1640), daughter and eventual sole heiress of Sir Anthony Mildmay (d. 1617), of Apethorpe Hall near the City of Peterborough in Northamptonshire, British Ambassador to France, by his wife Grace Sherington (1552–1620) a daughter and co-heiress of Sir Henry Sherington (alias Sharington) (c. 1518–1581) of Lacock Abbey in Wiltshire. By Mary Mildmay he had seven sons (six of whom survived him) and six daughters:

=== Sons ===
1. Mildmay Fane, 2nd Earl of Westmorland (24 January 1602 – 12 February 1666), a poet and Member of Parliament.
2. Thomas Fane, died in infancy
3. Sir Francis Fane (c. 1611–1681?) of Fulbeck, third but second surviving son. He was a Royalist governor of Doncaster, and afterwards of Lincoln Castle. He was the great-grandfather of Thomas Fane, 8th Earl of Westmorland.
4. Anthony Fane (1613–1643), a colonel in the Parliamentary army, who suffered a shot wound to the cheek at the siege of Farnham Castle on 9 December 1642 and died at his home in Kingston upon Thames early the following year. He married Amabel Benn who after his death married Henry Grey, 10th Earl of Kent.
5. Col. George Fane (c. 1616 – April 1663), fifth but fourth surviving son. A Royalist officer and later Member of Parliament.
6. William Fane
7. Robert Fane

=== Daughters ===
- Grace Fane (died 1633), who married James Home, 2nd Earl of Home in May 1626;
- Mary Fane (1606–1634), who after 18 May 1625 married Dutton Gerard, 3rd Baron Gerard (1613–1640), grandson of Thomas Gerard, 1st Baron Gerard;
- Elizabeth Fane, who married firstly Sir John Cope, 3rd Baronet, secondly William Cope, by whom she was a grandmother of Sir John Cope;
- Rachel Fane (1614–1681), wife of Henry Bourchier, 5th Earl of Bath (1593–1654), of Tawstock Court, Devon. The marriage was childless, whereupon the earldom became extinct. Her lifesize marble statue survives in Tawstock Church.
- Catherine Fane, who married Conyers Darcy, 2nd Earl of Holderness as his first wife.

== Death and burial ==
Westmorland was buried at Apethorpe on 17 April 1629. A monumental inscription survives in Mereworth Church near Badsell. He was survived by his wife Mary Mildmay, who died at Stevenage and was buried at Apethorpe, and many children.

== Arms ==
Coat of arms of Francis Fane, 1st Earl of Westmorland
Crest Out of a ducal coronet Or, a bull's head Argent pied Sable, armed of the first, charged on the neck with a rose Gules barbed and seeded Proper. Escutcheon Azure three dexter gauntlets backs affrontée Or. Supporters Dexter: a griffin per fesse Argent and Or, gorged with a plain collar and lined Sable; Sinister: a bull Argent pied Sable collared and lined Or, at the end of the line a ring and three staples of the last. Motto "NE VILE FANO" (Disgrace not the altar)

== Literature ==
- Cokayne, George Edward; Gibbs, Vicary; Doubleday, Herbert Arthur; White, Geoffrey Henllan; Walden, Thomas Scott-Ellis, Lord Howard de (2000) [1910]. The Complete Peerage of England, Scotland, Ireland, Great Britain and the United Kingdom, Extant, Extinct or Dormant, new ed. Gloucester: Alan Sutton Publishing.
- Collins, Arthur; Brydges, Egerton (1812). Collins's Peerage of England; Genealogical, Biographical, and Historical. Vol. 3. London: F. C. and J. Rivington, Otridge and son.
- Gunnis, Rupert (1957). Eridge Castle and the Family of Nevill. Stanford Print.
- Hasler, P. W., ed. (1981). The History of Parliament: the House of Commons 1558-1603. HMSO. ISBN 978-0118875011.
- Mercer, Malcolm (2004). "Fane, Sir Thomas (d. 1589)". Oxford Dictionary of National Biography (online ed.). Oxford University Press. doi:10.1093/ref:odnb/9143. (Subscription, Wikipedia Library access or UK public library membership required.)
- Salis, de, R. W. (2003). Quadrennial di Fano Saliceorum. London.

== Some ancestors ==
Francis Fane, 1st Earl of Westmorland's ancestors in three generations
Francis Fane, 1st Earl of Westmorland	Father: Sir Thomas Fane	Paternal Grandfather: George Fane, Esq.	Paternal Great-grandfather: Richard Fane, Esq.
Francis Fane, 1st Earl of Westmorland	Father: Sir Thomas Fane	Paternal Grandfather: George Fane, Esq.	Paternal Great-grandmother: Agnes Stidolph
Francis Fane, 1st Earl of Westmorland	Father: Sir Thomas Fane	Paternal Grandmother: Joan Waller	Paternal Great-grandfather: William Waller of Groombridge
Francis Fane, 1st Earl of Westmorland	Father: Sir Thomas Fane	Paternal Grandmother: Joan Waller	Paternal Great-grandmother: Anne Fallemar or Elizabeth Hendley (?).
Francis Fane, 1st Earl of Westmorland	Mother: Mary Nevill, Baroness le Despencer	Maternal Grandfather: Henry Nevill, 6th Baron Bergavenny	Maternal Great-grandfather: George Nevill, 5th Baron Bergavenny
Francis Fane, 1st Earl of Westmorland	Mother: Mary Nevill, Baroness le Despencer	Maternal Grandfather: Henry Nevill, 6th Baron Bergavenny	Maternal Great-grandmother: Mary Stafford
Francis Fane, 1st Earl of Westmorland	Mother: Mary Nevill, Baroness le Despencer	Maternal Grandmother: Frances Anne Manners	Maternal Great-grandfather: Thomas Manners, 1st Earl of Rutland
Francis Fane, 1st Earl of Westmorland	Mother: Mary Nevill, Baroness le Despencer	Maternal Grandmother: Frances Anne Manners	Maternal Great-grandmother: Eleanor Paston

Parliament of England
Preceded by Sir Robert Sidney; Percival Hart	Member of Parliament for Kent; 1601; With: Sir Henry Nevill	Succeeded by Sir John Scott; Sir John Leveson
Preceded by Sir Thomas Fludd; Sir John Leveson	Member of Parliament for Maidstone; 1604–1622; With: Lawrence Washington 1604–1611; Sir John Scott 1614; Sir Francis Barnham 1621–1622	Succeeded by Sir George Fane; Thomas Stanley
Preceded by Mildmay Fane; Walter FitzWilliam	Member of Parliament for Peterborough; 1624; With: Laurence Whitaker	Succeeded by Laurence Whitaker; Sir Christopher Hatton
Peerage of England
New creation	Earl of Westmorland, Baron Burghersh; 1624–1629	Succeeded by Mildmay Fane
Preceded by Mary Fane	Baron le Despencer; 1626–1629	Succeeded by Mildmay Fane
