= Henry Nevill, 6th Baron Bergavenny =

English peer

Henry Neville
- Baron Bergavenny
- Born: between 1527 and 1535
- Died: 10 February 1587
- Noble family: House of Neville
- Spouses: Lady Frances Manners; Elizabeth Darrell
- Issue: Mary Neville, Baroness Le Despenser
- Father: George Nevill, 5th Baron Bergavenny
- Mother: Lady Mary Stafford

Henry Nevill, 6th and de jure 4th Baron Abergavenny KG (between 1527 and 1535 – 10 February 1587) was an English peer. He was the son of Sir George Nevill, 5th Baron Bergavenny, and Mary Stafford (daughter of Edward Stafford, 3rd Duke of Buckingham). He succeeded to the barony upon the death of his father, George Nevill, 5th Baron Bergavenny.

== Biography ==
Henry, sixth (sometimes fourth) Lord Abergavenny, had summons to parliament on 23 January 1552, to 15 October 1586. He was one of the peers that sat in judgment on Mary, Queen of Scots, at Fotheringay. He died at his seat called Comfort, near Birling, Kent, on 10 February 1587.

He married first, Frances, daughter of Thomas Manners, 1st Earl of Rutland; he married secondly, Elizabeth, daughter of Stephen Darell, of Spelmonden, Kent (she remarried to Sir William Sedley, of Southfleet, Kent, Knt. and Bart.); by his first wife, he had an only daughter Mary Neville who married Sir Thomas Fane.

=== Wyatt's rebellion ===
During the Wyatt's rebellion of January–February 1554 Henry and Robert Southwell, the High Sheriff of Kent married to Henry's niece Margaret, led the loyalist forces against the rebels. According to D. M. Loades, "Sir Robert Southwell and Lord Abergavenny were almost the only significant gentlemen in the country whose loyalty was never in doubt"; "Southwell, Abergavenny and Cheney were the most active royalist leaders."

Henry and Southwell began recruitment of loyalist forces on 24 January, one day before the outbreak of the rebellion, although at this stage they had little success. On 26 January Wyatt declared Henry and Southwell "traitors to God, the Crown and the Commonwealth" for "stirring up the Queen's most loyal subjects of the realm."

By 27 January, the loyalists's position improved, and their combined forces in Kent matched the numbers of Wyatt's force in Rochester, at around two thousand men on each side. Henry and Southwell with six hundred men blocked the road from Tonbridge to Rochester to prevent consolidation of the rebels. On 28 January Southwell defeated Henry Isley's company of rebels at Wrotham, taking around sixty prisoners. However, on the same day the army of Duke of Norfolk deserted to Wyatt; Henry and Southwell fled to London. Wyatt marched to London himself with around three thousand men, but lost the initiative; Southwell and Thomas Cheney managed to raise another loyalist company in his rear. On 4 February Henry and Southwell marched to Greenwich. Wyatt was cut off from his base in Kent, and could not count on reinforcements while the loyalists' forces gained strength every day.

By 7 February, Wyatt's army disintegrated. Amongst Wyatt's supporters who were later sentenced to death was Thomas Fane, later Henry Nevill's son-in-law. Fane was pardoned due to his youth and he became a loyal supporter of the crown, a member of parliament and a son-in-law to Neville.

== Mary, Lady Fane ==
His daughter, Mary Neville, Baroness le Despencer, died 28 June 1626, aged 72, buried at Mereworth, Kent, having married at Birling, 12 December 1574, as the second wife, to Thomas Fane, of Badsell, Kent Her son, Francis, was created Earl of Westmorland, knighted at Dover Castle, 26 August 1573, died 13 March 1589, will dated 12 March 1589, proved 10 February 1590.

Lady Fane claimed the barony of Abergavenny against Edward Nevill, the heir male upon whom the castle of Bergavenny was settled as aforesaid, and as a compromise, she was by letters patent, 25 May 1604, confirmed in the name, style, and dignity of Baroness le Despencer, to the heirs of her body, with the ancient seat, place, and precedence of her ancestors.

== Ancestry ==
Henry Nevill, 6th Baron Bergavenny's ancestors in three generations
Henry Nevill, 6th Baron Bergavenny	Father: George Nevill, 5th Baron Bergavenny	Paternal Grandfather: George Nevill, 4th Baron Bergavenny	Paternal Great-grandfather: Edward Nevill, 3rd Baron Bergavenny
Henry Nevill, 6th Baron Bergavenny	Father: George Nevill, 5th Baron Bergavenny	Paternal Grandfather: George Nevill, 4th Baron Bergavenny	Paternal Great-grandmother: Elizabeth Beauchamp, Baroness Bergavenny
Henry Nevill, 6th Baron Bergavenny	Father: George Nevill, 5th Baron Bergavenny	Paternal Grandmother: Margaret Fenn	Paternal Great-grandfather: Hugh Fenn
Henry Nevill, 6th Baron Bergavenny	Father: George Nevill, 5th Baron Bergavenny	Paternal Grandmother: Margaret Fenn	Paternal Great-grandmother: Eleanor
Henry Nevill, 6th Baron Bergavenny	Mother: Mary Stafford, Baroness Bergavenny	Maternal Grandfather: Edward Stafford, 3rd Duke of Buckingham	Maternal Great-grandfather: Henry Stafford, 2nd Duke of Buckingham
Henry Nevill, 6th Baron Bergavenny	Mother: Mary Stafford, Baroness Bergavenny	Maternal Grandfather: Edward Stafford, 3rd Duke of Buckingham	Maternal Great-grandmother: Catherine Woodville, Duchess of Buckingham
Henry Nevill, 6th Baron Bergavenny	Mother: Mary Stafford, Baroness Bergavenny	Maternal Grandmother: Eleanor Percy, Duchess of Buckingham	Maternal Great-grandfather: Henry Percy, 4th Earl of Northumberland
Henry Nevill, 6th Baron Bergavenny	Mother: Mary Stafford, Baroness Bergavenny	Maternal Grandmother: Eleanor Percy, Duchess of Buckingham	Maternal Great-grandmother: Maud Herbert, Countess of Northumberland

== Notes ==
Peerage of England
Preceded by George Nevill	Baron Bergavenny; 1535–1587	Succeeded by Edward Nevill
