= Mereworth =

Village in Kent, England

Coordinates: 51.271860°N 0.387590°E

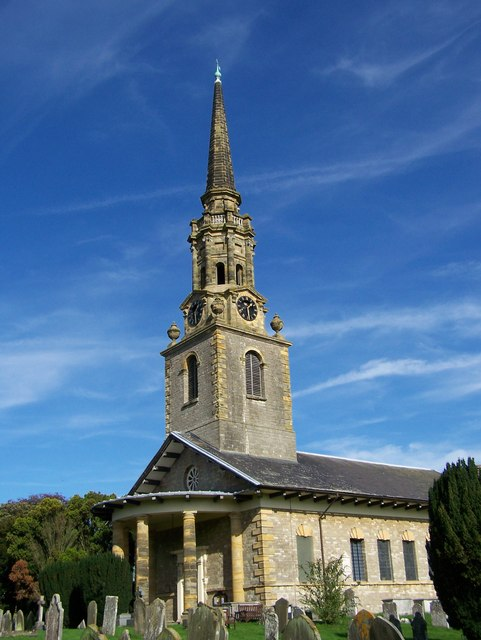
- St Lawrence's Church, Mereworth

- Location within Kent
- Population: 1,068 (2011 Census)
- OS grid reference: TQ660537
- Civil parish: Mereworth
- District: Tonbridge and Malling
- Shire county: Kent
- Region: South East
- Country: England
- Sovereign state: United Kingdom
- Post town: Maidstone
- Postcode district: ME18
- Police: Kent
- Fire: Kent
- Ambulance: South East Coast
- UK Parliament: Tonbridge

Mereworth (/ˈmɛriwɜːrθ/ MERRY-worth) is a village and civil parish near the town of Maidstone in Kent, England. The Wateringbury Stream flows through the village and powered a watermill, the site of which now lies within the grounds of Mereworth Castle.

== History ==
In the early 18th century the Honourable John Fane – later 7th Earl of Westmoreland – inherited the manor. He had the Palladian mansion built. Designed by Colen Campbell, Mereworth Castle then overlooked the village, so Fane had the village moved so that it could not be seen from the estate, about 1/2 mile (800 m) to the north west of its original location. He also demolished the church, providing the villagers with a new Palladian-style replacement, now dedicated to St Lawrence. Mereworth Church is a Grade I listed building.

== Notable people ==
- Dominick Browne (1901–2002), 2nd Baron Mereworth, lived at Mereworth Castle until 1930.
- Geoffrey Browne, 3rd Baron Oranmore and Browne (1861–1927), 2nd Baron Mereworth, lived at Mereworth Castle.
- Francis Fane (1580–1629), peer, lived at Mereworth Castle.
- John Fane (1685–1762), nobleman, built the present Mereworth Castle.
- Richard Hosmer (1757–1820), cricketer, was born in Mereworth.
- Charles Lucas VC (1834–1914), Rear-Admiral, is buried in the churchyard of St Lawrence's Church, Mereworth and was the first person to be awarded the Victoria Cross.

== See also ==
- Mereworth Sound, British Columbia, Canada
- Listed buildings in Mereworth
