= Henry Sutton Fane =

English politician

Member of Parliament for Lyme Regis
- In office 1826 – 7 June 1832 Serving with John Thomas Fane
- Succeeded by: William Pinner one seat after Reform Act 1832

Personal details
- Born: 13 January 1804
- Died: 7 May 1857 (aged 53)
- Parent(s): John Fane, 10th Earl of Westmorland (father); Jane Fane, Countess of Westmorland (mother)

Hon. Henry Sutton Fane (13 January 1804 – May 1857) was an English politician in the 19th century. He was a Tory Member of Parliament for Lyme Regis from 1826 to 1832.
