= Robert Child (Wells MP) =

English banker and politician

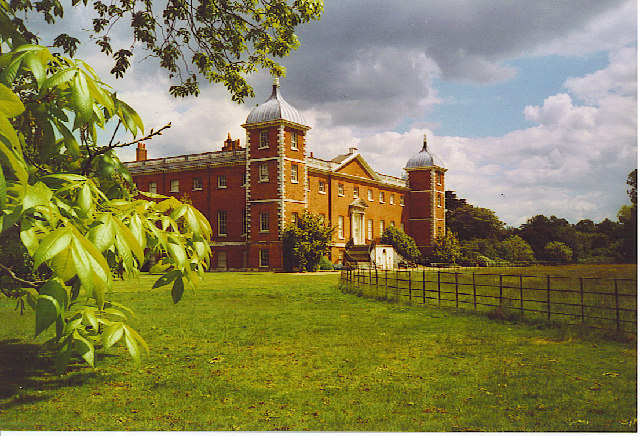
Osterley House, Robert Child's home in Middlesex

Robert Child (February 1739 – 28 July 1782) was an English banker and politician. He was the Member of Parliament (MP) for Wells from 1765 until his death.

== Career ==
He was the second surviving son of Samuel Child MP, and younger brother of Francis Child. In 1763, he succeeded his brother as nominal head of the family's bank, Child & Co., bringing him an annual income of over £30,000 (£4.66 million in 2023). He also inherited the estate of Osterley Park in Middlesex, where he continued his brother's project of remodelling the house to the designs of Robert Adam.

Child contested Aylesbury at a by-election in 1764, but withdrew due to ill-health. The following year he contested Wells, and after a bitterly fought campaign, two polls were held; one returned Child, the other his rival Peter Taylor, a local grocer's son who grown rich as an army commissary in Germany during the Seven Years' War. In early 1766 Child was awarded the seat on petition. He appears never to have spoken in the House of Commons, and voted largely with the opposition despite his bank's significant business with the government.

== Personal life and family ==
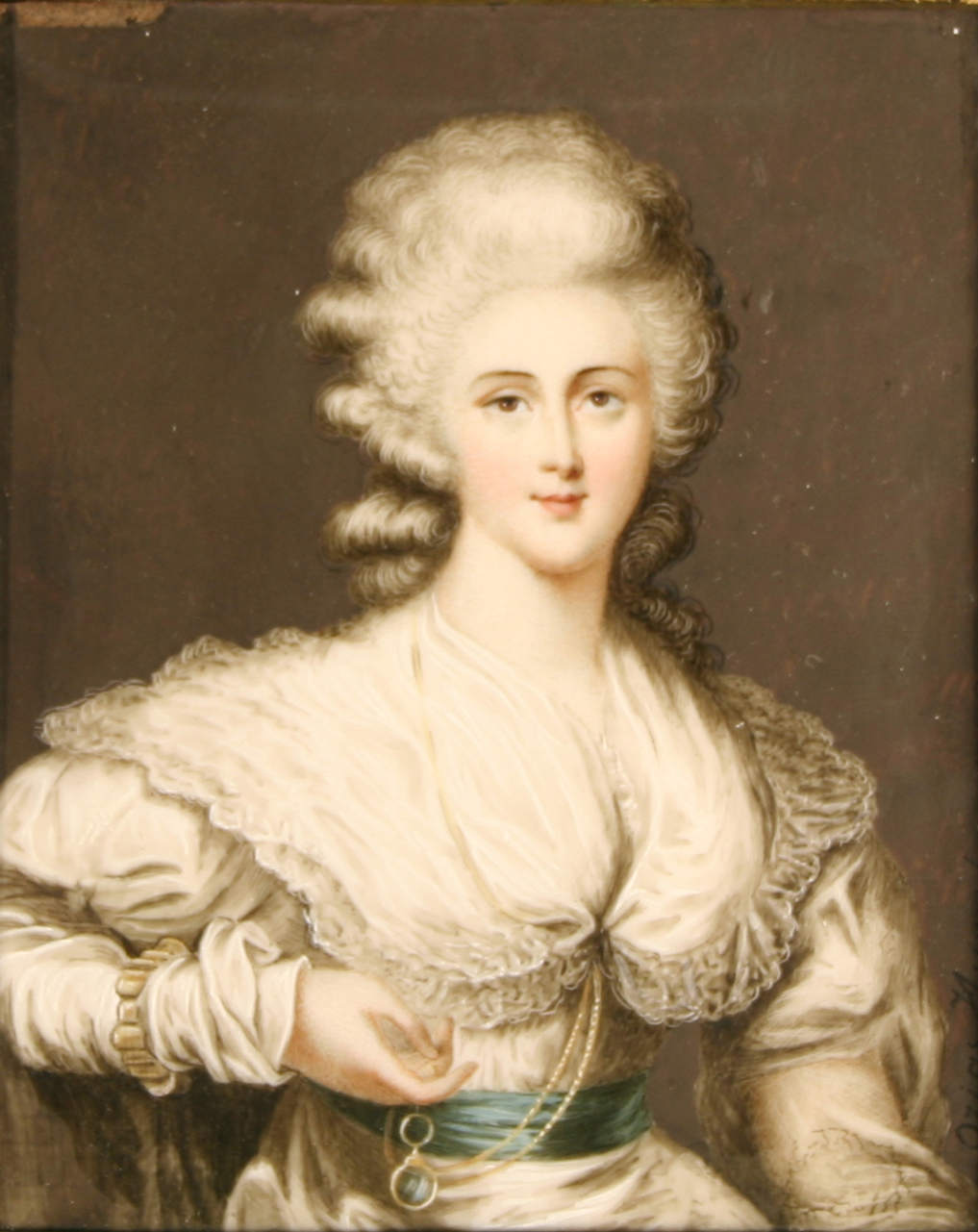
Child's runaway daughter Sarah Anne, as painted in miniature in 1786

In October 1763, Child married Sarah Jodrell, daughter of Gilbert Jodrell of Ankerwyke, Buckinghamshire. They had only one child, a daughter Sarah Anne (born 1764), who in May 1782 eloped to Gretna Green to marry the 10th Earl of Westmorland. Her father abhorred the Earl, and pursued the couple until one of his horses was shot by Westmorland's men. Her father had approved the marriage before his death in July that year, but disinherited her to prevent his fortune falling into Westmorland's hands.

Instead, his wife Sarah inherited a life interest in the bank, where she remained a senior partner until her death in 1793. She remarried in 1791, to Francis Reynolds-Moreton, 3rd Baron Ducie, but excluded him from the running of the bank. After her death, her husband's will settled his estate on the second surviving son or eldest daughter of Sarah Anne. However, only one of Child's grandsons survived, so the estate — including Osterley Park and the senior partnership in the bank — passed to Sarah Sophia Fane, his eldest granddaughter. She married George Child Villiers, 5th Earl of Jersey, but like her grandmother she ran the bank without admitting her husband to the partnership.

Her wealth was so great that on her marriage in 1805 she gave £20,000 (£2.05 million in 2023) each to her father, her brother and two sisters, but still had an annual income from her inheritance of over £60,000 (£6.15 million in 2023).

Parliament of Great Britain
Preceded by Clement Tudway; Peter Taylor	Member of Parliament for Wells; 1766–1782; With: Clement Tudway	Succeeded by John Curtis; Clement Tudway
