= Osterley Park =

Park and historic house museum in London

Osterley House
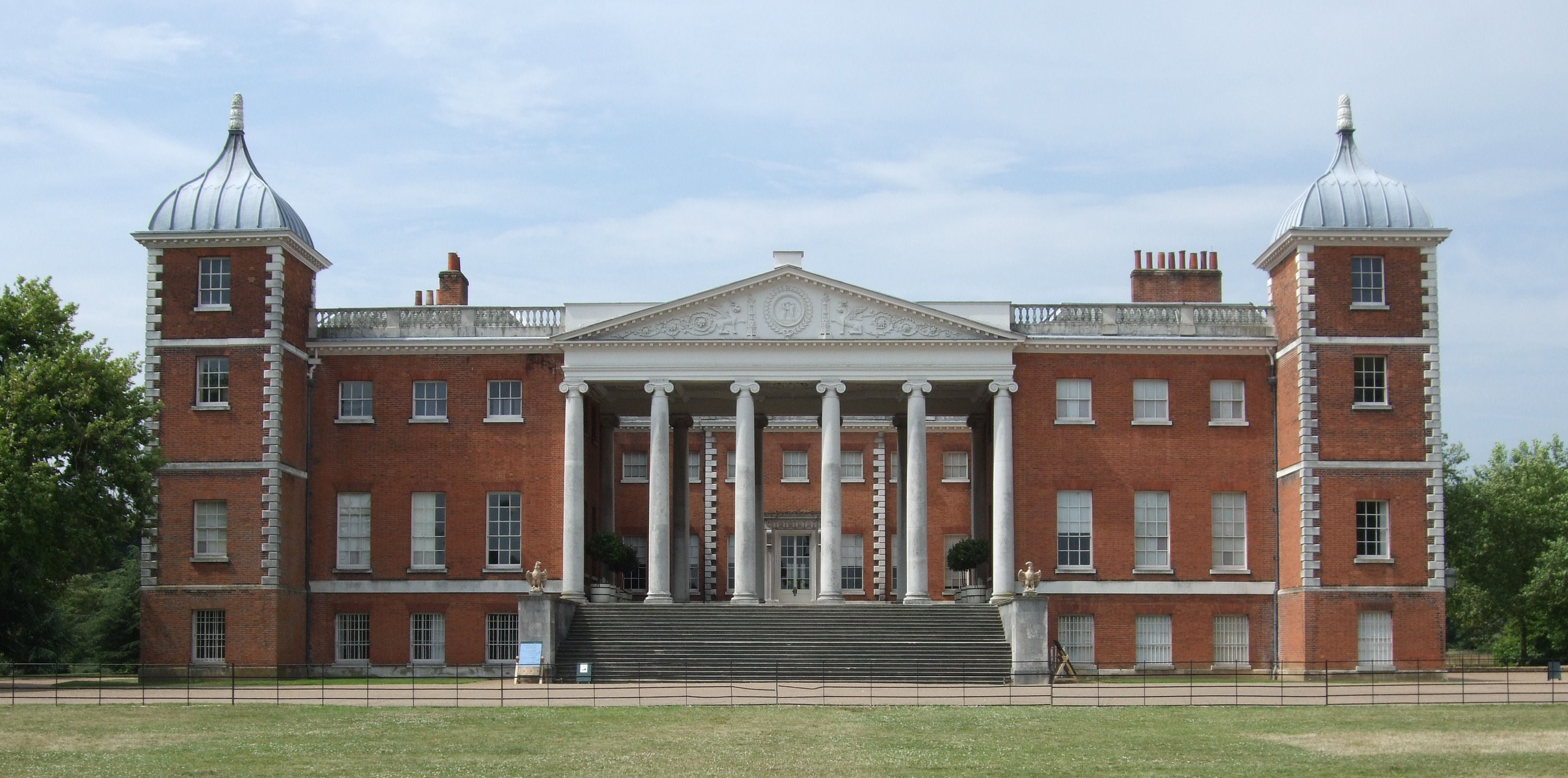

- Location within London Borough of Hounslow
- 51°29′21.75″N 00°21′07.14″W
- Type: Country house
- Location: Jersey Road, Isleworth, UK

History
- Built: 1570s
- Built for: Sir Thomas Gresham
- Rebuilt: 1761–1765

Site notes
- Architect: Robert Adam (1760s)
- Current use: Historic house museum
- Owner: National Trust

Listed Building – Grade I
- Official name: Osterley House
- Designated: 21 May 1973
- Reference no.: 1080308

Osterley Park is a Georgian country estate in west London, which straddles the London boroughs of Ealing and Hounslow. Originally dating from the 1570s, the estate contains a number of Grade I and II listed buildings, with the park listed as Grade II*. The main building (Osterley House) was remodelled by Robert Adam between 1761 and 1765. The National Trust took charge of Osterley in 1991, and the house and park are open to visitors.

== History ==
=== Early history ===
The original building on this site was a manor house built in the 1570s for banker Sir Thomas Gresham, who purchased the manor of Osterley in 1562. The "faire and stately brick house" was completed in 1576. It is known that Elizabeth I visited. The stable block from that period remains at Osterley Park. Gresham, the founder of the Royal Exchange, also bought the neighbouring Manor of Boston in 1572.

=== Child family ===
During the late 17th century, the estate was owned by Nicholas Barbon, a developer who mortgaged it to Child's Bank and then died in debt around 1698. As a result of a mortgage default, by the early 1710s, the estate came into the ownership of Sir Francis Child, the founder of Child's Bank. In 1761, Sir Francis's grandsons, Francis and Robert, employed Scottish architect Robert Adam (who was just emerging as one of the most fashionable architects in Britain) to remodel the house. When Francis Child died in 1763, the project was taken up by his brother and heir, Robert Child, for whom the interiors were created.

The house is of red brick with white stone details and is approximately square, with turrets in the four corners. Adam's design, which incorporates some of the earlier structure, is highly unusual, and it differs greatly in style from the original construction. One side is left almost open and is spanned by an Ionic pedimented screen, which is approached by a broad flight of steps and leads to a central courtyard, which is at piano nobile level.

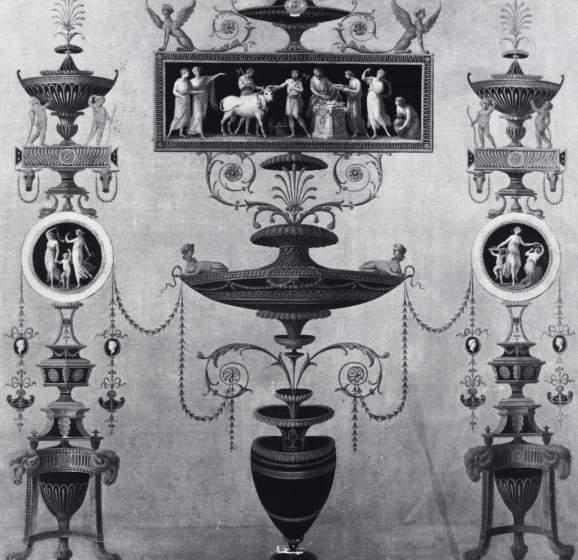
Robert Adam's design for one of the walls of the Etruscan dressing room

Adam's neoclassical interiors are among his most notable sequences of rooms. Horace Walpole described the drawing room as "worthy of Eve before the fall". The rooms are characterised by elaborate but restrained plasterwork, rich, highly varied colour schemes, and a degree of coordination between decor and furnishings unusual in English neoclassical interiors. Notable rooms include the entrance hall, which has large semi-circular alcoves at each end, and the Etruscan dressing room, which Adam said was inspired by the "Etruscan" vases (as they were then regarded, now recognised as Greek) in Sir William Hamilton's collection, illustrations of which had recently been published. Adam also designed some of the furniture, including the opulent domed state bed, which is still in the house.

Robert Child's only daughter, Sarah, married John Fane, 10th Earl of Westmorland, in 1782. When Child died two months later, his will placed his vast holdings, including Osterley, in trust for any second-to-be born grandchild. This proved to be Lady Sarah Fane, who was born in 1785. Child's will kept his property out of the hands of John Fane, his son-in-law. Under the doctrine of coverture then in force, if Child had given his daughter more than a life interest in any property, Fane would have had control of it. Fane had eloped with Child's daughter to Gretna Green, as Child had not consented to the marriage. Child had wished his daughter to marry someone willing to take on the Child surname and ensure its continuation. Child's eventual heiress, Lady Sarah Fane, married George Villiers in 1804 and, having children, the estate passed into the Villiers family. In 1819, George Villiers changed his surname to Child Villiers.

=== Later history ===
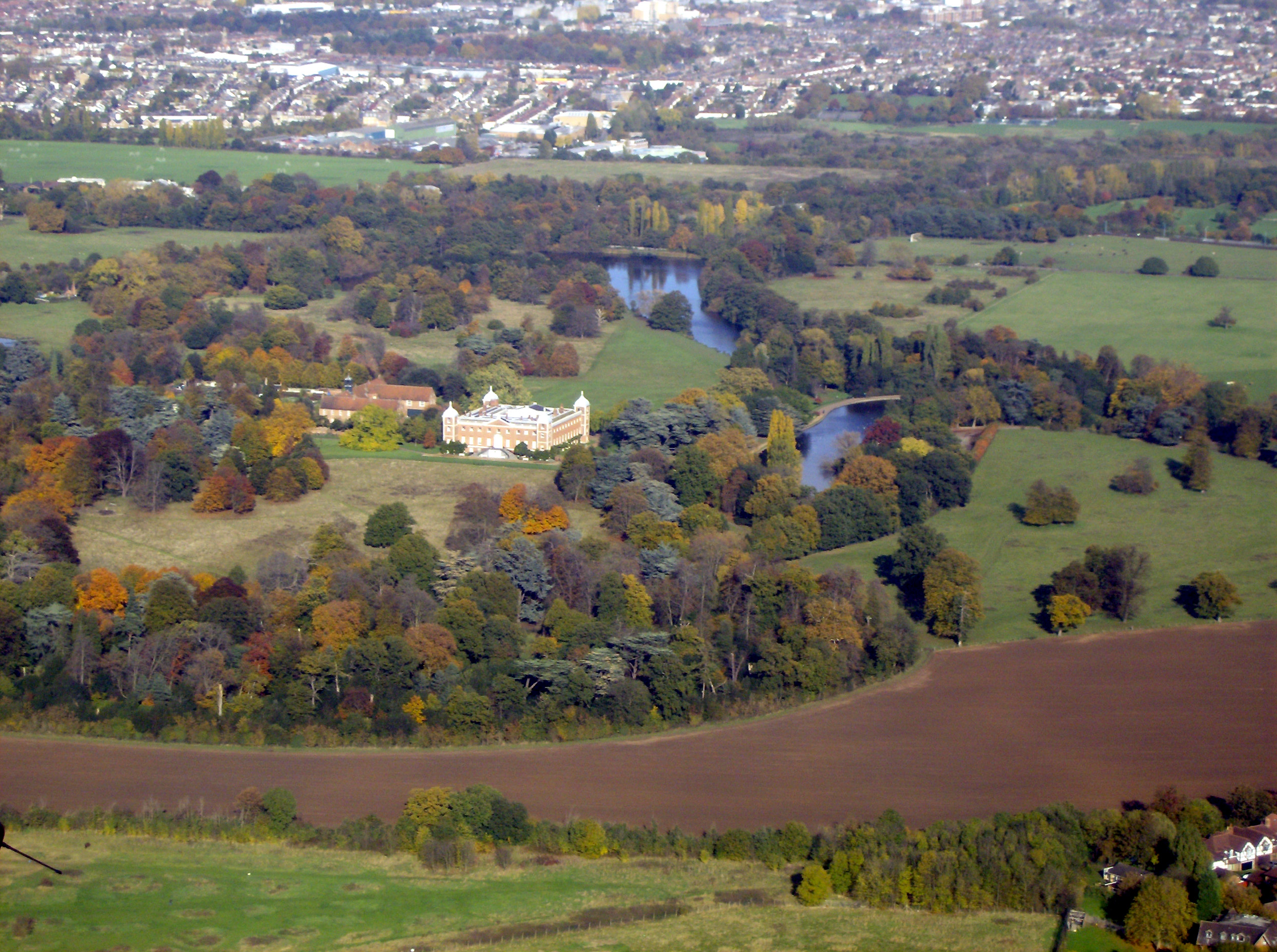
Osterley Park from the air

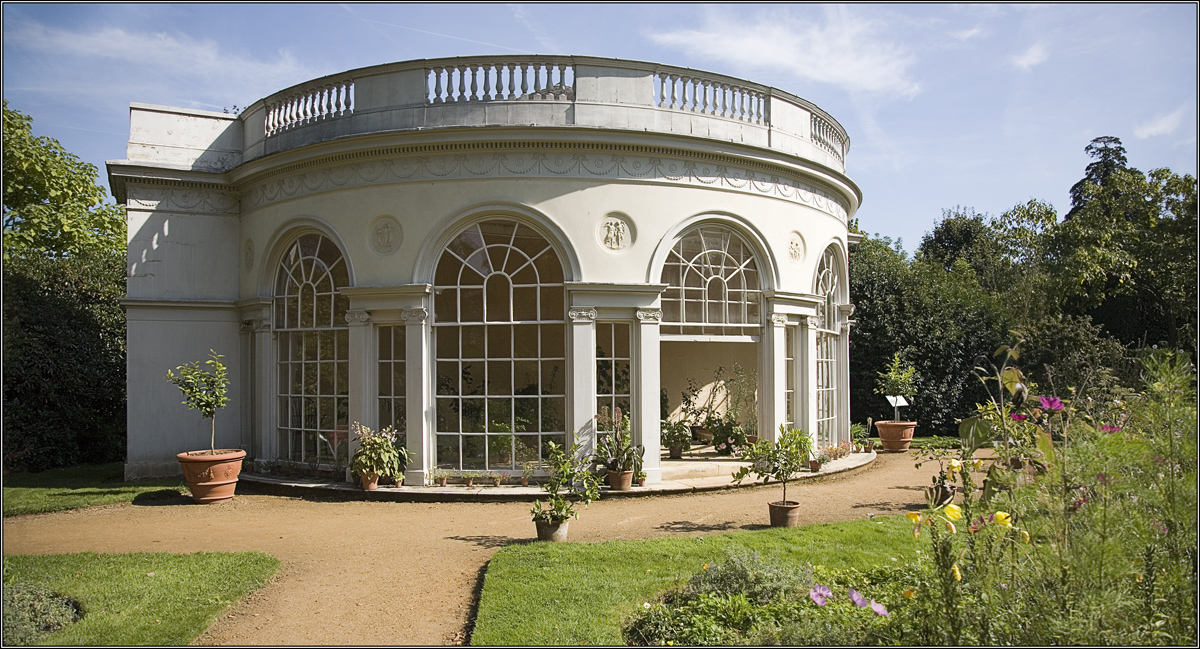
Garden House

George Child Villiers, 9th Earl of Jersey, opened Osterley to the public in 1939 after having received many requests from people wishing to see its historic interior. He justified his decision by saying that it was "sufficient answer that he did not live in it and that many others wished to see it". Some 12,000 people visited the house during its first month of opening. Villiers staged a series of exhibitions of artworks by living artists in the top-floor rooms to contrast with the 18th-century interiors on the ground floor. He also planned to create an arboretum in the grounds, although that never came to fruition.

==== Home Guard training establishment ====
The grounds of Osterley Park were used for the training of the first members of the Local Defence Volunteers (forerunners of the Home Guard) when the 9th Earl, a friend of publisher Edward George Warris Hulton, allowed writer and military journalist Captain Tom Wintringham to establish the first Home Guard training school (which Hulton sponsored) at the park in May–June 1940. It included teaching the theory and practice of modern mechanical warfare, guerilla-warfare techniques and street-fighting techniques, making use of some estate workers' houses that had been scheduled for demolition.

Painter Roland Penrose taught camouflaging here, an extension of work he had developed with the paintbrush in avant-garde paintings to protect the modesty of his lover, Elizabeth 'Lee' Miller (married to Aziz E. Bey). Maj. Wilfred Vernon taught the art of mixing home-made explosives, and his explosives store can still be seen at the rear of the house, while Canadian Bert "Yank" Levy, who had served under Wintringham in the Spanish Civil War, taught knife fighting and hand-to-hand combat. Despite winning world fame in newsreels and newspaper articles around the world (particularly in the US), the school was disapproved of by the War Office and Winston Churchill, and it was taken over in September 1940. Closed in 1941, its staff and courses were reallocated to other newly opened War Office-approved Home Guard schools.

==== National Trust ====
After the Second World War, Lord Jersey approached Middlesex County Council, which had shown interest in buying the estate, but eventually decided to give the house and its park to the National Trust. The furniture was sold to the Victoria & Albert Museum. In 1947, Lord Jersey moved to the island of Jersey, taking with him many pictures from the collection at Osterley. Some were destroyed in a warehouse fire on the island soon after. Lord Jersey assisted the Ministry of Works and the V&A in their restoration of the house to its present late-18th-century state.

The National Trust took charge of Osterley in 1991. The house has enjoyed loans and gifts from Lord Jersey, including items of silver, porcelain, furniture and miniatures. The trust commissioned portraits of Lord Jersey and his wife by Howard J. Morgan, which hang upstairs. In 2014, William Villiers, 10th Earl of Jersey, the present Earl, arranged a ten-year loan to Osterley of portraits of the Child family. The pictures that are part of the loan include Allan Ramsay's portrait of Francis Child (1758), and George Romney's portrait of Francis's brother, Robert.

The house and small formal gardens are open to the public. They account for 30,000 paying visitors per year. Many hundreds of thousands of visitors per year walk the footpaths and enjoy the woodland of the surrounding park at no cost. A weekly 5k Parkrun takes place in the park.

The house saw its latest restoration from 2018 to 2021. This repaired structural deterioration and discolouring of the external brickwork.

== Gallery ==
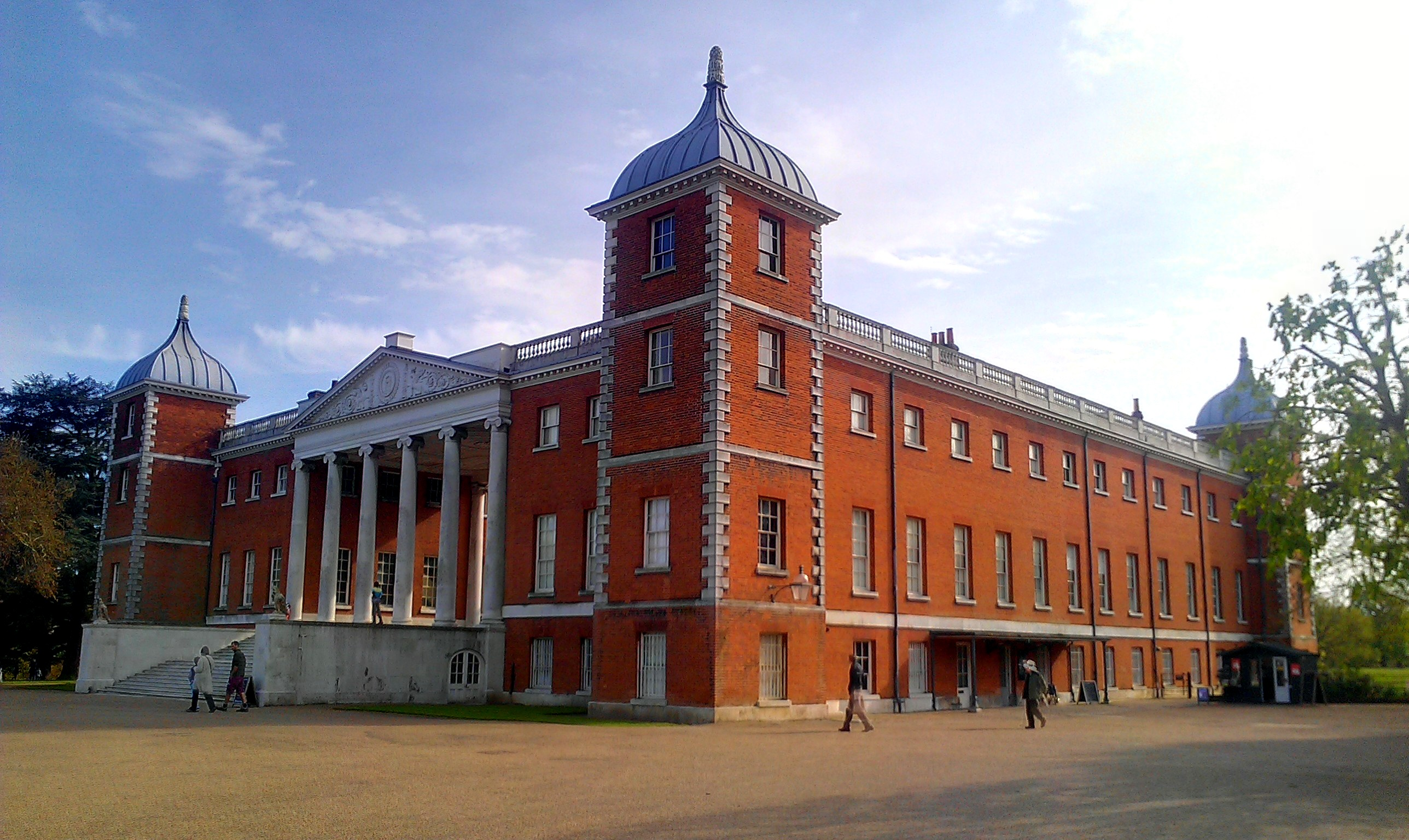
The house

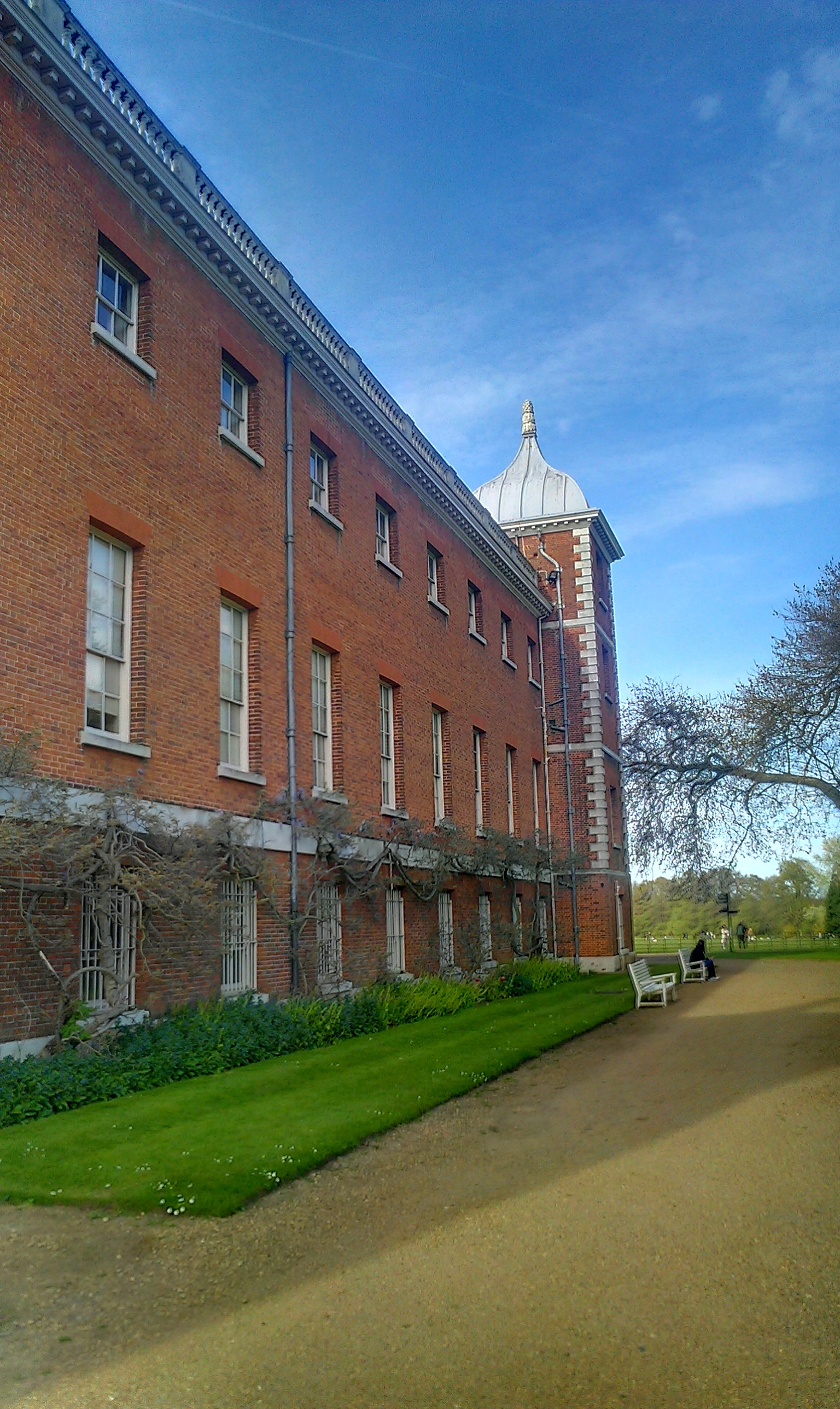
A side view

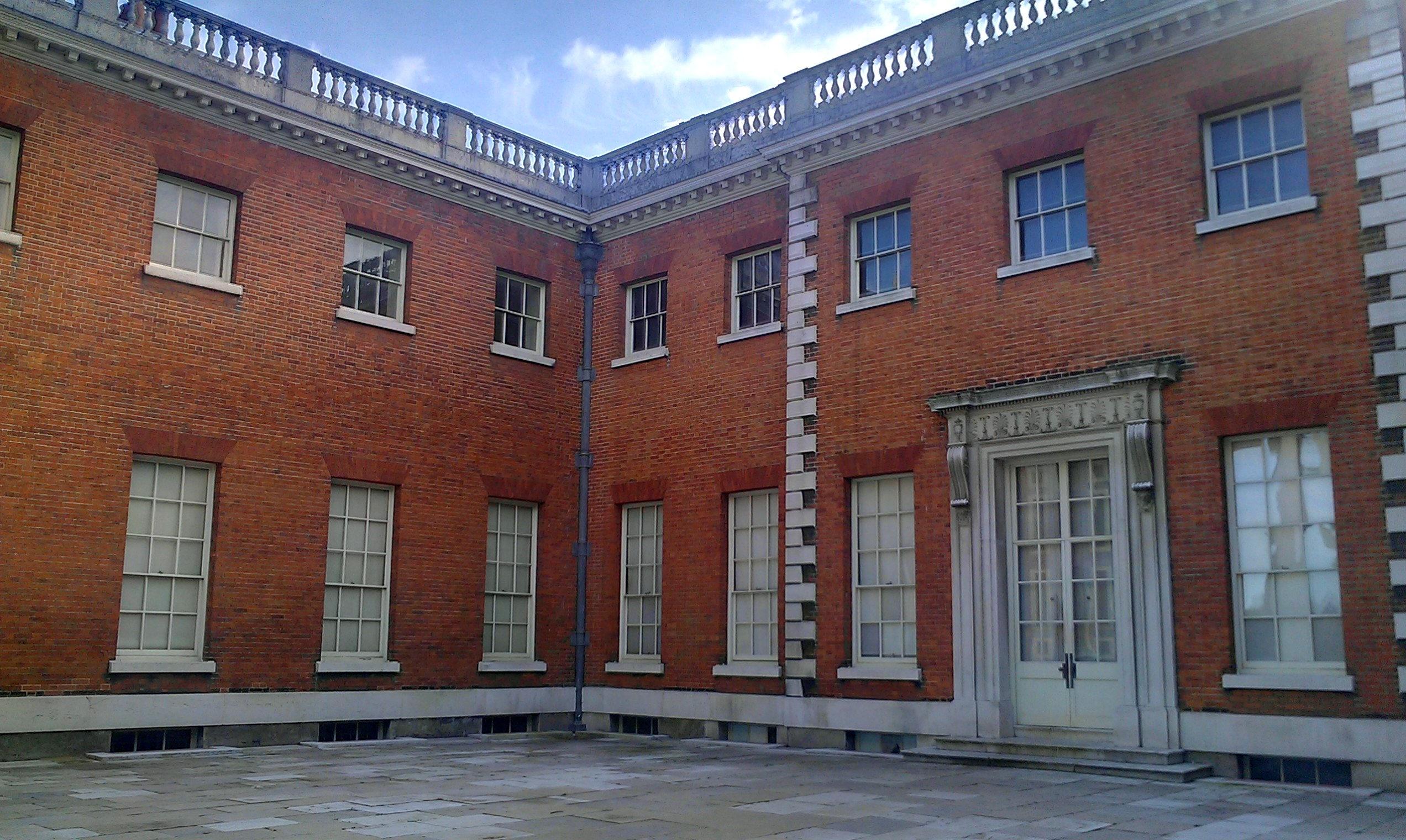
The courtyard

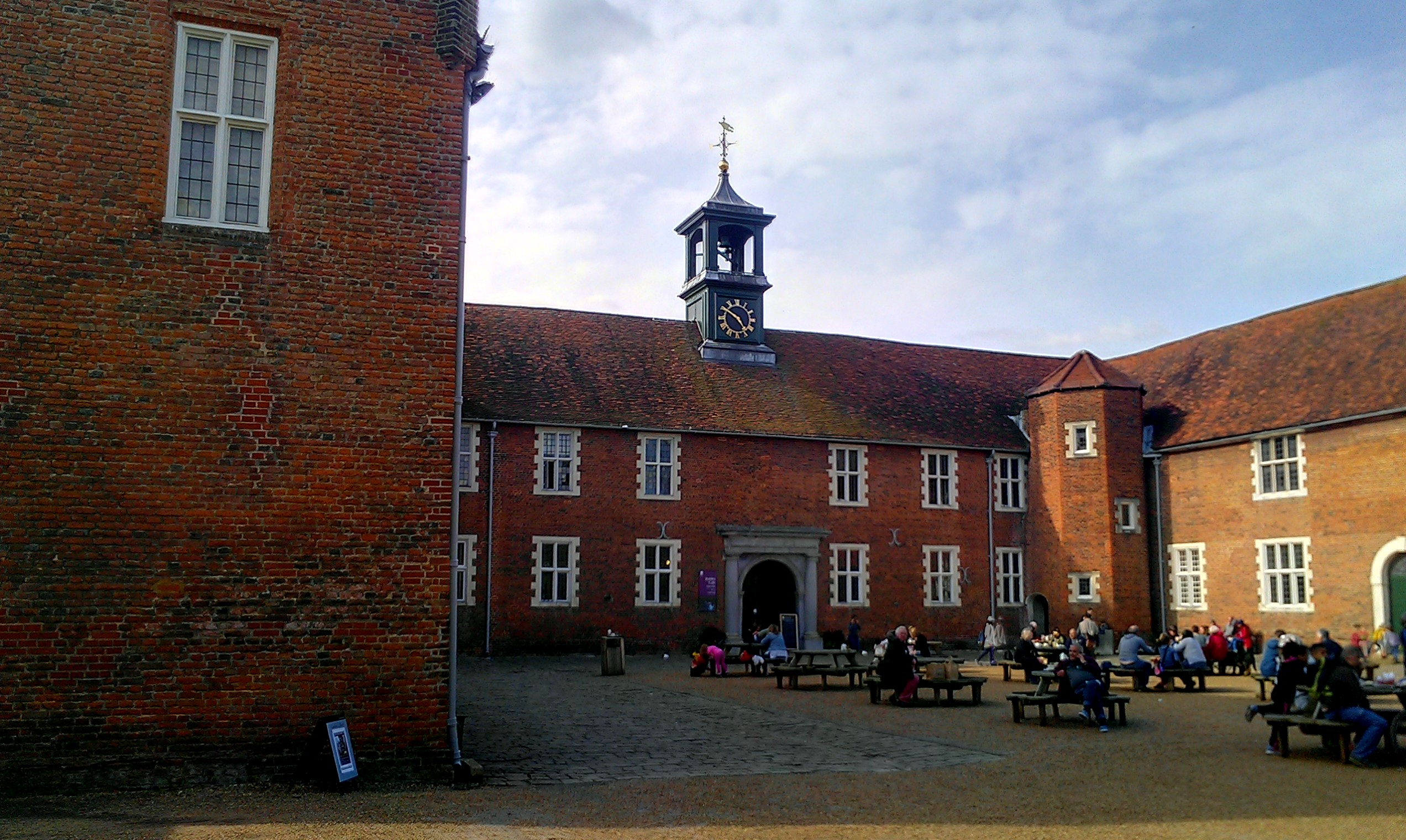
Former stables, now a cafe

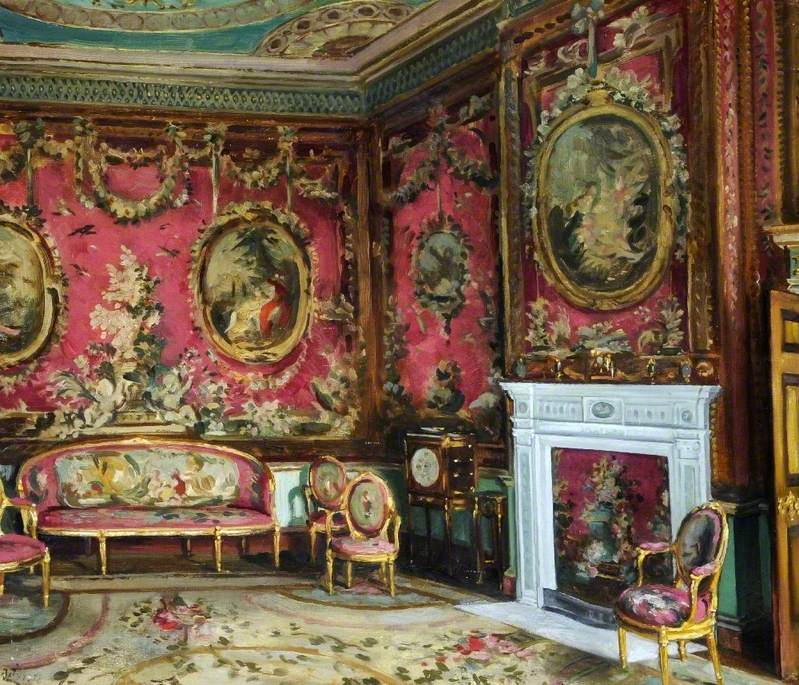
Interior of the house in 1931

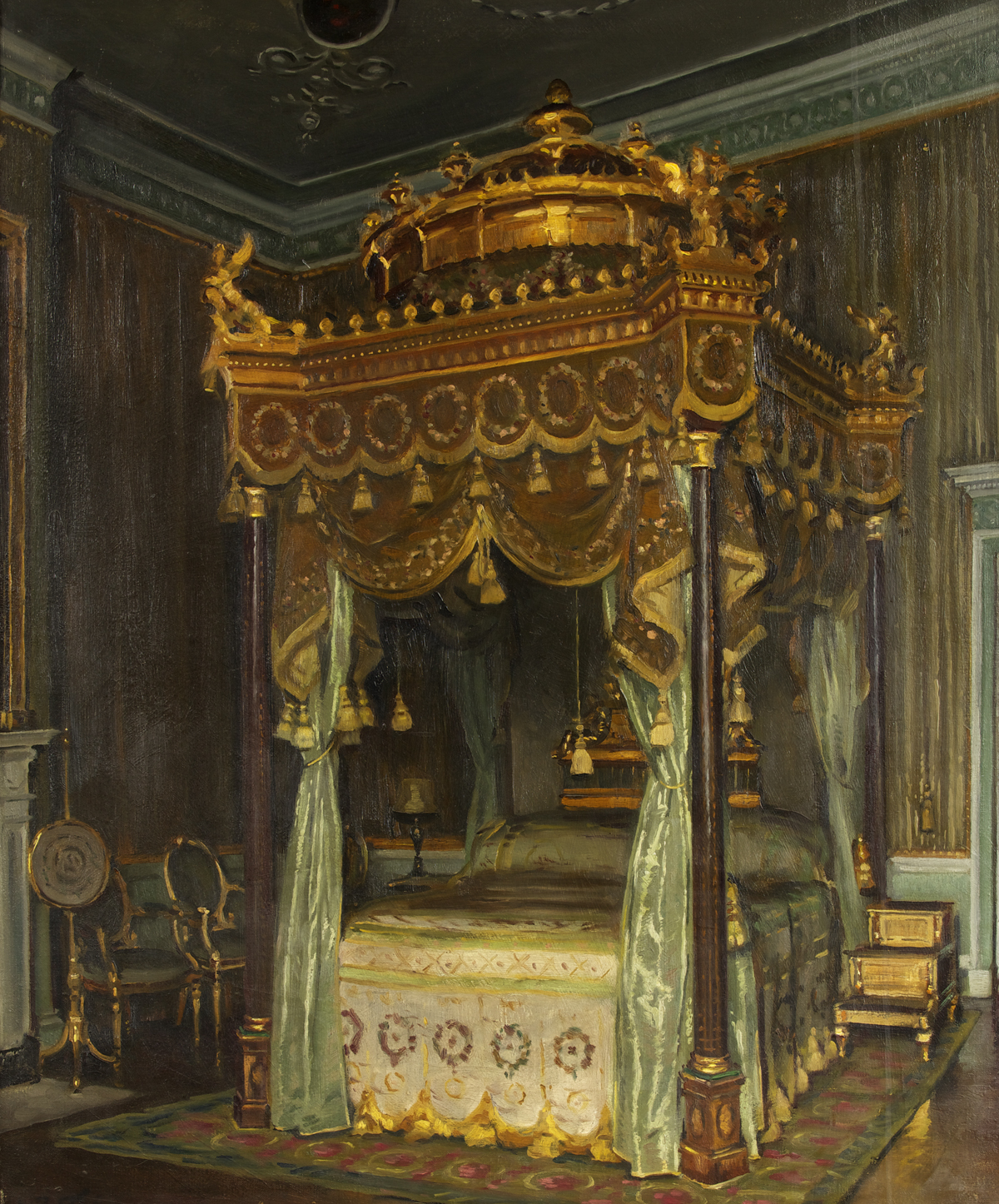
State Bed at Osterley House

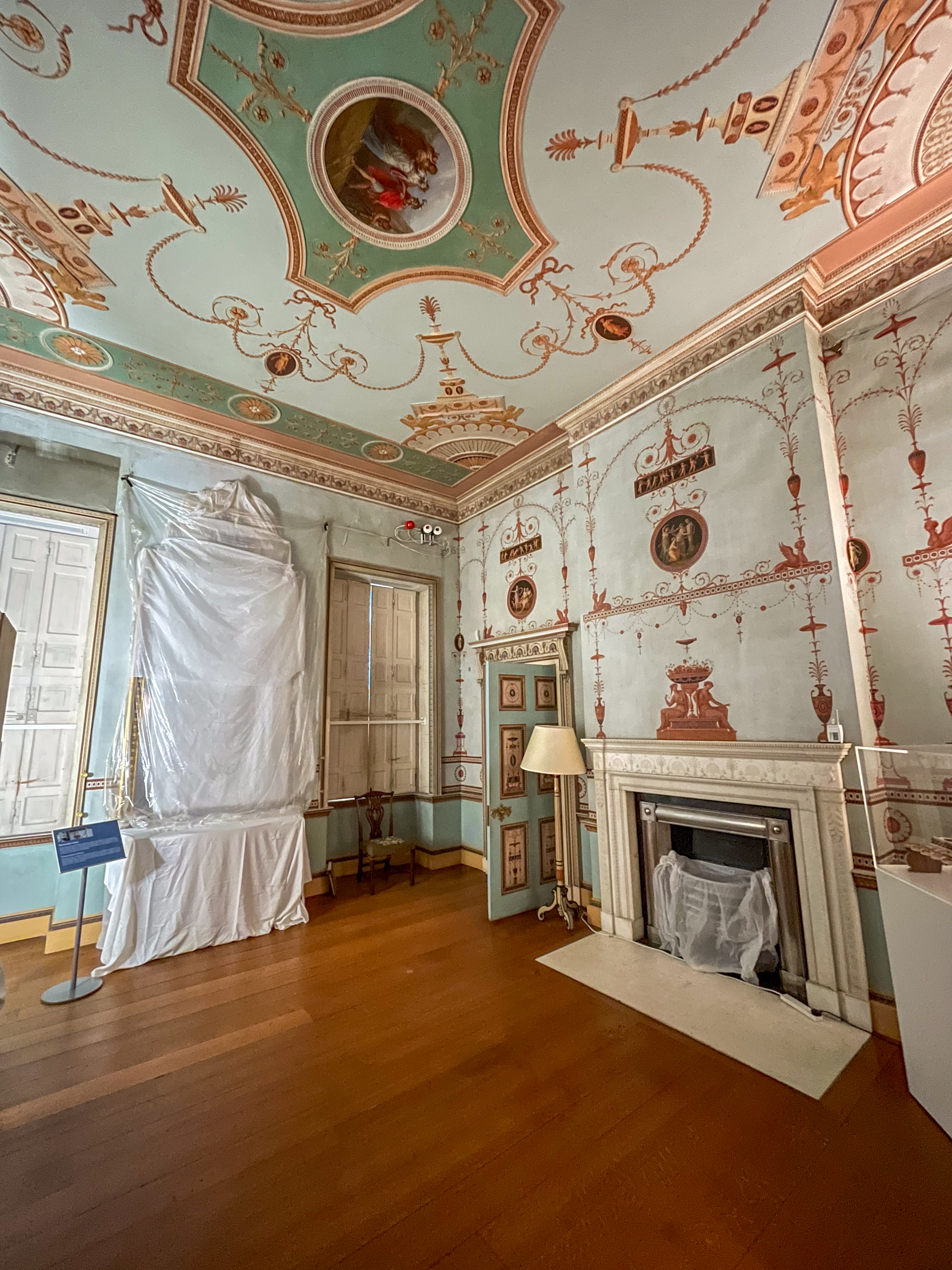
The Etruscan Room
