= Jane Fane, Countess of Westmorland =

Jane Fane
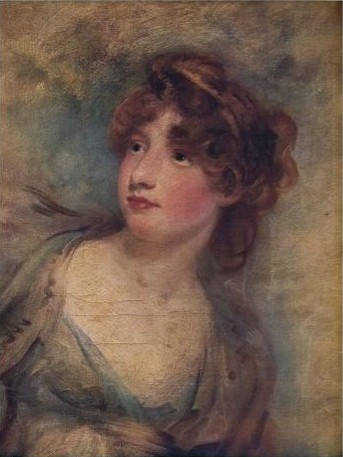
- Died: 1857 (aged 73–74)
- Other names: Jane Fane, Countess of Westmorland; Jane Huck-Saunders

Jane Fane, Countess of Westmorland (1783 – March 26, 1857), formerly Jane Saunders (or Huck-Saunders), was the second wife of John Fane, 10th Earl of Westmorland.

== Life ==
Jane was one of the two daughters of Dr Richard Huck-Saunders (born Richard Huck) and his wife, the former Jane Kinsey. Her great-uncle was Admiral Sir Charles Saunders. Her sister Anne became Viscountess Melville. Through the admiral, his wife's maternal uncle, Dr Huck-Saunders came into possession of a sizeable inheritance, which was left to their daughters.

It was said of the countess that she was "... perhaps not mad, but nobody ever approached so near it with so much reason."

She was a patron of the poet John Keats and his friend, the artist Joseph Severn, and later a supporter of Lord Byron, despite her friendship with Lady Caroline Lamb (who first met Byron at the countess's house). John Hoppner painted her portrait in the guise of Hebe.

After her husband's death, the dowager countess bought Cotterstock Hall near Oundle. It was at Brympton d'Evercy that she died, predeceasing her two surviving sons, Henry and Montagu, by only a few weeks; the latter suffered from heart disease. The countess was buried in St Andrew's Church, Brympton.

== Family ==
Jane and Lord Fane were married in 1800, when Jane was seventeen and her husband 41. The earl's first wife, Sarah, had died in 1793, after producing five children.

Jane had three sons and two daughters, of whom only the eldest child, Lady Georgiana Fane, outlived both parents by more than a year; Lady Georgiana became notorious for her pursuit of the Duke of Wellington.

- Lady Cecily Jane Georgiana Fane (1801–1875), who died unmarried
- Hon. Charles Saunders John Fane (1802–1810), who died unmarried
- Hon. Col. Henry Sutton Fane (1804–1857), MP, who died unmarried
- Hon. Montagu Augustus Villiers Fane (1805–1857), who died unmarried
- Lady Evelina Fane (1807–1808)

In 1810, the couple separated and the countess lived at Brympton d'Evercy near Yeovil with Lady Georgiana. She was living outside the country at the time of her husband's death in 1841.
