= Maria Ponsonby, Viscountess Duncannon =

English aristocrat (1787-1834)

Maria Ponsonby, Viscountess Duncannon (née Lady Maria Fane; 11 May 1787 – 19 March 1834) was an English aristocrat and the wife of John Ponsonby, Viscount Duncannon (later 4th Earl of Bessborough). She died before he inherited the earldom and thus was never Countess of Bessborough, but three of her sons were successively earls of Bessborough.

== Early life ==
She was the daughter of John Fane, 10th Earl of Westmorland, and his first wife, the former Sarah Anne Child. Her brother was John Fane, 11th Earl of Westmorland, and her sisters were Sarah Villiers, Countess of Jersey (1785–1867), Lady Augusta Fane (1786–1871; later Lady Boringdon) and Lady Charlotte Fane (1793–1822).

== Personal life ==
She married Ponsonby on 16 November 1805 at Berkeley Square, London, when he was known as Viscount Duncannon. They had eight sons and six daughters, including:

- Lady Georgiana Sarah Ponsonby (1807–1861), who married Rev. Sackville Bourke, nephew of the Earl of Mayo, and had five children
- John George Brabazon Ponsonby, 5th Earl of Bessborough (1809–1880), who married firstly, Lady Frances Charlotte Lambton, and secondly, Lady Caroline Amelia Gordon-Lennox, but had no children
- William Wentworth Brabazon Ponsonby (29 December 1812 – 8 July 1831), who died unmarried
- Lady Augusta Lavinia Priscilla Ponsonby (11 May 1814 – 19 November 1904), who married firstly William Petty-FitzMaurice, Earl of Kerry, and had one child; she married secondly, the Hon. Charles Alexander Gore
- Frederick George Brabazon Ponsonby, 6th Earl of Bessborough (1815–1895), who died unmarried
- Lady Emily Charlotte Mary Ponsonby (1817–1877). She died unmarried but was the author of novels which were published without attribution.
- Lady Maria Jane Elizabeth Ponsonby (1819–1897), who married Hon. Charles Ponsonby, 2nd Baron de Mauley, and had children
- Hon. George Arthur Brabazon Ponsonby (1820–1841), who died unmarried
- Reverend Walter William Brabazon Ponsonby, 7th Earl of Bessborough (1821–1906), who married Lady Louisa Susan Cornwallis Eliot, and had children
- Rt. Hon. Sir Spencer Cecil Ponsonby-Fane (1824–1915), who married the Hon. Louisa Anne Rose Lee Dillon and had children; Spencer inherited the estate of Brympton d'Evercy from his mother's half-sister Lady Georgiana Fane.
- Lady Harriet Frederica Anne Ponsonby (1825–1900)
- Lady Kathleen Louisa Georgina Ponsonby (1826–1863), who married Frederick Edward Bunbury Tighe and had no children
- Hon. Cecil Robert Brabazon (28 May 1828 – 5 July 1828), died in infancy
- Hon. Gerald Henry Brabazon Ponsonby (1829–1908), who married Lady Maria Emma Catherine Coventry and had children

After several months of illness, Lady Duncannon died in 1834, aged 46, at her home in Cavendish Square, London. She died the day after her daughter Lady Augusta's wedding to the Earl of Kerry.

Her husband survived her by thirteen years and died in May 1847, aged 65. He was succeeded in the earldom by their eldest son, John, and subsequently by their younger sons Frederick and Walter.

=== Descendants ===
Through her daughter Lady Augusta Gore, Viscountess Duncannon was the grandmother of sportsman Spencer Gore; who won the first Wimbledon singles title in 1877, the Rt. Rev. Charles Gore, the Bishop of Oxford; and the barrister Sir Francis Charles Gore. Through Spencer, she was an ancestor of the artists Spencer "Freddie" Gore and Frederick Gore.
