= Anne Dundas, Viscountess Melville =

Anne Dundas, Viscountess Melville (formerly Huck / Huck-Saunders; died 10 September 1841) was the wife of Robert Dundas, 2nd Viscount Melville, and was a Lady of the Bedchamber to Charlotte of Mecklenburg-Strelitz, wife of King George III of the United Kingdom, from 1813 to the queen's death in 1818.

Anne was one of the two daughters of Dr Richard Huck-Saunders (born Richard Huck) and his wife, the former Jane Kinsey. Her great-uncle was Admiral Sir Charles Saunders. Her elder sister Jane became Countess of Westmorland. Through the admiral, his wife's maternal uncle, Dr Huck-Saunders and his wife acquired a sizeable inheritance, which passed to their daughters.

Anne married the future viscount on 29 August 1796, when he was an MP. He inherited the viscountcy in 1811, making her a viscountess. The couple had six children, including:

- Henry Dundas, 3rd Viscount Melville (1801–1876), who died unmarried
- Vice-Admiral Hon. Sir Richard Saunders Dundas (1802–1861), who died unmarried
- Robert Dundas, 4th Viscount Melville (1803–1886), who married Mary Hamilton and died without heirs
- Reverend Hon. Charles Dundas (1806–1883), who married Louisa Maria Boothby and had seven children, including Robert Dundas, 5th Viscount Melville, and Charles Saunders Dundas, 6th Viscount Melville

She died at Melville Castle in Scotland. Her husband outlived her.
