= Richard Huck-Saunders =

English physician

Richard Huck-Saunders (né Huck; 1720–1785) was an English physician.

== Early life ==
He was born in Westmoreland in 1720 to parents were named Huck, and educated at the grammar school of Croughland, Cumberland. After a five years' apprenticeship with a surgeon at Penrith named Neal, he entered as a student at St Thomas's Hospital, London.

In 1745, Huck entered the army, and was appointed surgeon to the 25th Regiment of Foot, the regiment of Hugh Sempill, 12th Lord Sempill. He was present at the Battle of Culloden, and served until the Treaty of Aix-la-Chapelle of 1748 ended the War of Austrian Succession.

Huck returned to Penrith, and, in 1749, received the degree of M.D. from Marischal College, Aberdeen. In 1750 he was appointed surgeon to the 33rd Regiment of Foot; he joined it at Minorca, and remained there three years. From 1753 to 1755, he was quartered with his regiment at Edinburgh, and attended medical classes at the university.

== Seven Years' War in British America ==
Huck next went to America under John Campbell, 4th Earl of Loudoun, by whom he was promoted to the rank of physician to the army. In that capacity he served during the Seven Years' War. In 1757–8 John Forbes was his patient. After that, his medical superior James Napier assigned him to the army of James Abercrombie. Following the successful Siege of Havana, in 1762, Huck returned to England.

== Continental tour and fever doctor ==
In poor health, Huck made a continental tour, journeying through France, Germany, and Italy. In 1763 he was in Vienna, visiting the hospitals and meeting Anton de Haen. At this period he corresponded with Sir John Pringle, who later commented on Huck's treatment of fever, preliminary to administration of Chinchona bark, as recorded by Donald Monro. Along with Pringle and other physicians, Huck recommended bleeding for dysentery.

== Later life ==
Huck settled in Spring Gardens, London, as a physician, and was admitted a licentiate of the College of Physicians of London on 1 April 1765. From 1767 he owned a share in Lot 53, Prince Edward Island.

In London Huck associated with Thomas Denman and Benjamin Rush. John Morgan was a friend. He knew Benjamin Franklin, who mentioned him in a 1773 letter to Jan Ingenhousz. In 1767 he was one of the reforming group in the College of Physicians, of which he could not become a Fellow since he held no Oxbridge degree. With others including John Fothergill they founded a schismatic Society of Collegiate Physicians.

Huck was elected a Fellow of the Royal Society in 1768; and of the College of Surgeons, de speciali gratia (by grace or favour), in 1784. He was appointed physician to Middlesex Hospital in September 1766, and physician to St Thomas's Hospital on 14 December 1768, resigning his post at the former.

Huck held his position at St Thomas's until 1777, when he was succeeded by Henry Revell Reynolds. He died in the West Indies on 24 July 1785.

== Family ==
In 1777 Huck married Jane Saunders, heiress of Admiral Sir Charles Saunders and originally Jane Kinsey, and acquired a large fortune. He assumed the name of Saunders in addition to his own. They had two daughters:

- Anne, who married in 1796 Robert Dundas, 2nd Viscount Melville
- Jane, who married in 1800 John Fane, 10th Earl of Westmorland.
