= Sarah Child =

British banker

Sarah Child (née Jodrell; died 1793) was a British banker.

She was daughter of Gilbert Jodrell of Ankerwyke, Buckinghamshire. She married Robert Child, and became the mother of Sarah Fane, Countess of Westmorland.

On the death of her spouse in 1782, she inherited the position of nominal head of the major bank Child & Co., which was not a common position for a woman in Great Britain in the 18th century.

After her death, her position in the bank was inherited by her granddaughter Sarah Villiers, Countess of Jersey.
