= Sarah Fane, Countess of Westmorland =

English noblewoman

The Right Honourable The Countess of Westmorland
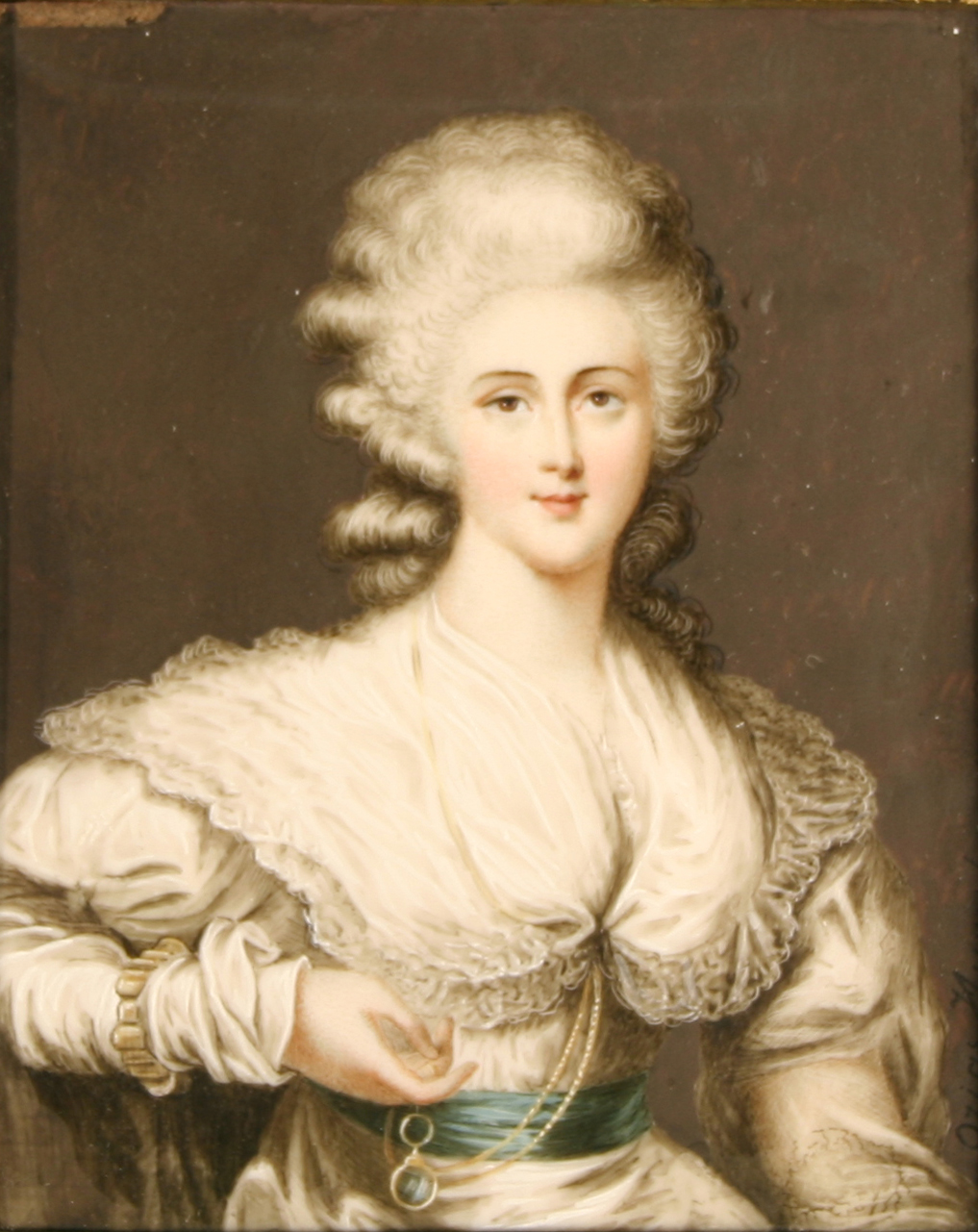
- Sarah Anne Fane, Countess of Westmorland, in 1786 by Ozias Humphrey
- Born: Sarah Anne Child; 28 August 1764
- Died: 9 November 1793 (aged 29); Phoenix Park, Dublin
- Spouse: John Fane, 10th Earl of Westmorland (after 1782)
- Issue: 5
- Parents: Robert Child; Sarah Jodrell

Sarah Anne Fane, Countess of Westmorland (née Child; 28 August 1764 – 9 November 1793) was an English noblewoman.

She was the only child of Robert Child, the owner of Osterley Park and principal shareholder in the banking firm Child & Co, and Sarah Child. She married John Fane, 10th Earl of Westmorland, on 20 May 1782 at Gretna Green after they eloped together. Her parents were dissatisfied with the match: Sarah Anne being an only child, her father wanted her to marry a commoner who would take the Child name; but Sarah Anne told her mother, "A bird in the hand is worth two in the bush." Her father would leave no capital to her or any eldest child, leaving his house and fortune to the (any) second child of Sarah Anne, instead of the likely Westmorland primogeniture heir-to-be. A second marriage ceremony took place at Apethorpe, Northamptonshire on 7 June 1782. She died of a fever at Phoenix Park, Dublin on 9 November 1793.

Sarah Anne and the earl's surviving children were:

- John Fane, 11th Earl of Westmorland (1784–1859)
- Lady Sarah Sophia Fane (1785–1867), married Viscount Villers, later George Villiers, 5th Earl of Jersey, in 1804.
- Lady Augusta Fane (1786–1871), m. 1. John Parker, Lord Boringdon (later 1st Earl of Morley), in 1804, divorced 1809; m. 2 also in 1809 Sir Arthur Paget (1771–1840), son of the 1st Earl of Uxbridge.
- Lady Maria Fane (1787–1834), m. 1805 John Ponsonby, Viscount Duncannon, later 4th Earl of Bessborough.
- Lady Charlotte Fane (1793–1822)

As only one son of the marriage survived, most of Child's fortune eventually went to his eldest granddaughter, Lady Sarah Sophia.

Seven years after Sarah's death, the Earl of Westmorland married Jane Saunders, an heiress, and had further children.
