= Sarah Villiers, Countess of Jersey =

English noblewoman

The Right Honourable The Countess of Jersey
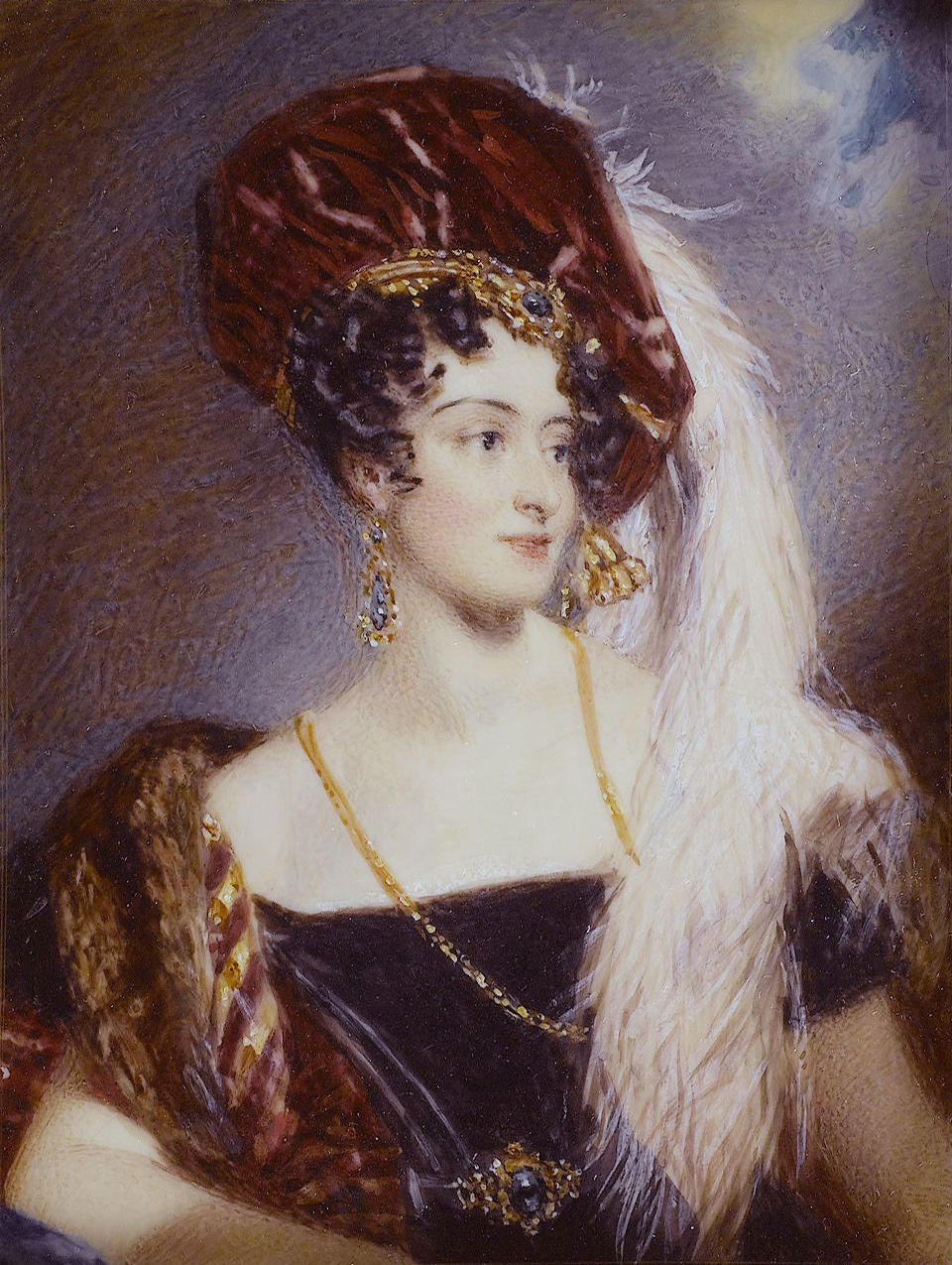
- Portrait of Lady Jersey, by Alfred Edward Chalon

Personal details
- Born: Lady Sarah Sophia Fane; 4 March 1785
- Died: 26 January 1867 (aged 81) Berkeley Square, Middlesex
- Spouse: George Child Villiers, 5th Earl of Jersey (m. 1804; died 1859)
- Children: 7
- Parent(s): John Fane, 10th Earl of Westmorland; Sarah Anne Child
- Relatives: Robert Child (grandfather); Sarah Child (grandmother); Maria Ponsonby, Viscountess Duncannon (sister)

Sarah Sophia Child Villiers, Countess of Jersey (4 March 1785 – 26 January 1867), born Lady Sarah Fane, was an English noblewoman and banker, and through her marriage a member of the Villiers family.

== Early life ==
She was the eldest daughter of John Fane, 10th Earl of Westmorland, and Sarah Anne Child. Her younger sister Maria married John Ponsonby, Viscount Duncannon, later the 4th Earl of Bessborough, a brother of Lady Caroline Lamb. Her other sister, Lady Augusta, married firstly the 2nd Baron Boringdon and in 1809 she scandalously eloped with and later, after her divorce from Lord Boringdon was finalised, finally married Sir Arthur Paget.

Her mother was the only child of Robert Child, the principal shareholder in the banking firm Child & Co.

== Career ==
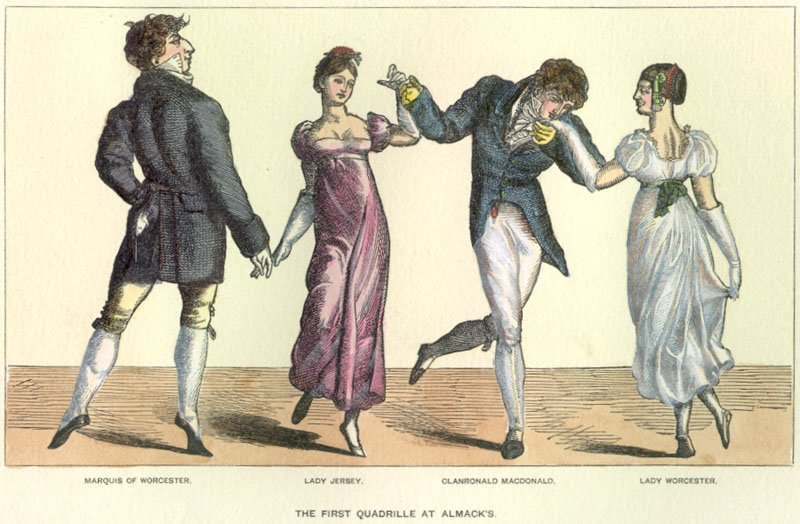
The First Quadrille at Almack's, an illustration featuring Lady Jersey, second from left

Under the terms of her grandfather's will, she was the primary legatee, and she not only inherited Osterley Park but became senior partner of Child & Co. after the death of her grandmother, Sarah Child. Her husband, George Villiers, added the surname Child by royal licence. The inheritance made her one of the richest women in England: in 1805 she was able to give £20,000 each to four family members without impairing her own income. In politics, she was a Tory, although she lacked the passionate interest in politics shown by her cousin Harriet Arbuthnot. On hearing that the Duke of Wellington had fallen from power in 1830, she burst into tears in public. She reportedly "moved heaven and earth" against the Reform Act 1832.

== Personal life ==
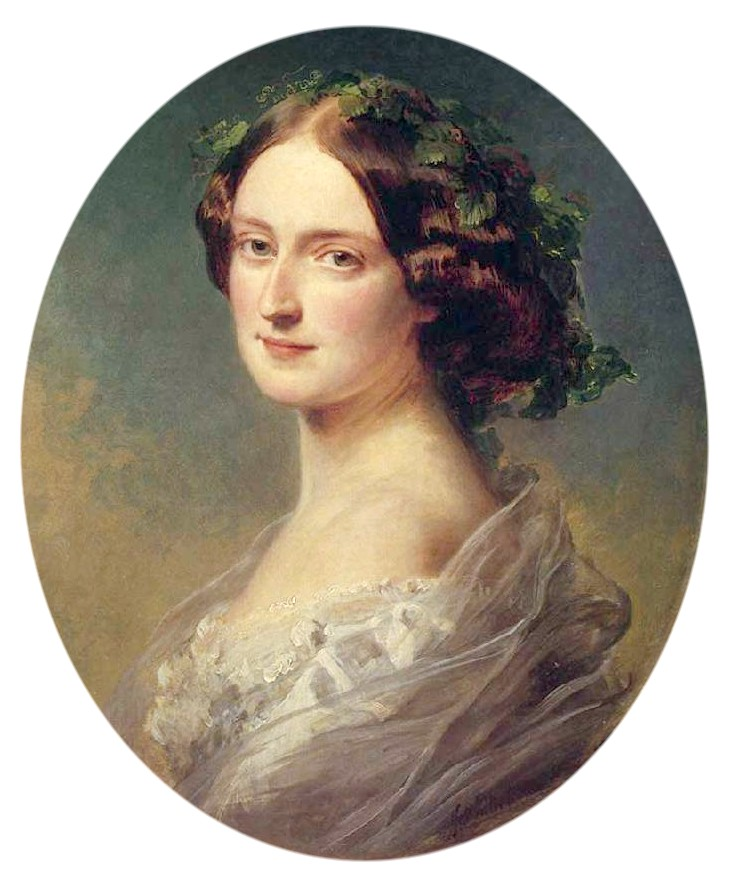
Her daughter, Lady Clementina Child-Villiers, by Franz Xaver Winterhalter

She married George Child Villiers, 5th Earl of Jersey, on 23 May 1804, in the drawing room of her house in Berkeley Square. Her husband's mother, Frances Villiers, Countess of Jersey (also Lady Jersey), was one of the more notorious mistresses of King George IV when he was Prince of Wales. Her own affairs, though conducted discreetly, were said to be numerous: Henry John Temple, 3rd Viscount Palmerston, was thought to be one of her lovers. When asked why he had never fought a duel to preserve his wife's reputation, Lord Jersey drily replied that this would require him to fight every man in London. Together, Sarah and George were the parents of seven children:

- George Child Villiers, 6th Earl of Jersey (1808–1859), who married Julia Peel, a daughter of the Prime Minister, Sir Robert Peel
- Hon. Augustus John Villiers (1810–1847), married Georgiana Elphinstone, daughter of George Elphinstone, 1st Viscount Keith
- Hon. Frederick William Child Villiers (1815–1871), married Lady Elizabeth Maria van Reede, daughter of Reynoud Diederik Jacob van Reede, 7th Earl of Athlone
- Hon. Francis John Robert Child Villiers (1819–1862)
- Lady Sarah Frederica Caroline Child Villiers (1822–1853), married Nikolaus Paul, 9th Prince Esterházy, a son of Princess Maria Theresia of Thurn and Taxis, a friend of Lady Jersey and a fellow patroness of Almack's
- Lady Clementina Augusta Wellington Child Villiers (1824–1858)
- Lady Adela Corisande Maria Child Villiers (1828–1860), married Lt. Col. Charles Parke Ibbetson. Lady Adela's scandalous elopement to Gretna Green with Captain Ibbetson increased the circulation of all the London newspapers in November 1845.

Lady Jersey was one of the patronesses of Almack's, the most exclusive social club in London, and a leader of the ton during the Regency era. Lady Jersey was known by the nickname Silence; the nickname was ironic since, famously, she almost never stopped talking. The memoirist Captain Gronow, who disliked her, called her "a theatrical tragedy queen", and considered her "ill-bred and inconceivably rude".

She died at No. 38, Berkeley Square, Middlesex (now London). She had outlived not only her husband, but six of her seven children.

== In popular culture ==
She was immortalized as Zenobia in Disraeli's novel Endymion. Caroline Lamb ridiculed her in Glenarvon; in revenge Lady Jersey had her barred from Almack's, the ultimate social disgrace. This, however, was unusual since she was notable for acts of kindness and generosity; and she was eventually persuaded by Caroline's family to remove the ban.

She is a recurring character in the Regency novels of Georgette Heyer, where she is presented as eccentric and unpredictable, but highly intelligent and observant, and capable of kindness and generosity.
