= Cotterstock =

Coordinates: 52.5015°N 0.4649°W

- Location within Northamptonshire
- Population: 153 (2011)
- OS grid reference: TL0490
- Unitary authority: North Northamptonshire
- Ceremonial county: Northamptonshire
- Region: East Midlands
- Country: England
- Sovereign state: United Kingdom
- Post town: Peterborough
- Postcode district: PE8
- Dialling code: 01832
- Police: Northamptonshire
- Fire: Northamptonshire
- Ambulance: East Midlands
- UK Parliament: Corby and East Northamptonshire

Cotterstock is a village and civil parish in North Northamptonshire, England. The population of the civil parish at the 2011 census was 153.

== Geography ==
Cotterstock is on the banks of the River Nene, which flows through the city of Peterborough 16 miles (26 km) to the north east and empties into the North Sea in The Wash. The nearest larger town is Oundle 2 1/2 miles (4.0 km) to the south west.

== History ==
Cotterstock was recorded in the Domesday Book as Codestoche, the name probably deriving from Old English "corther-stoc" (dairy farm).

In the summer of 1736 a Romano-British villa was discovered when tesserae from a large mosaic pavement were uncovered during ploughing. The villa was subsequently located a second time by aerial photography during the extremely dry summer of 1976, when parch marks of buried walls were recorded spread across three fields. A geophysical survey undertaken to accurately locate and amplify the aerial photographic information was carried out over a total of ten days in 1992 and 1993. A total of 19,140 soil resistance values were recorded at one-metre intervals within a grid composed of 20-metre squares.

The Church of St Andrew is located to the east of the village, adjacent to the River Nene; it dates from the late 12th century. The main period of construction was in the 13th and 14th centuries and the building was restored and extended in 1876. Cotterstock Hall was built in 1658 with alterations in the early 18th century and a main staircase added in the 19th century. The poet and playwright John Dryden was a frequent visitor and is thought to have stayed in the south-west attic room at the Hall, visiting relatives, the last of whom, Rev Sir George Booth, died in 1797. The house was later purchased by Jane Fane, Countess of Westmorland, who died there in 1857.

Also of interest is the Old Mill which was built during the early 19th century. Cotterstock parish contains 20 entries on the statutory list of buildings of special architectural or historic interest, 16 of which are within the Conservation Area covering the eastern part of the village around St Andrew's Church and Cotterstock Hall. Tree Preservation Orders have been made on trees in and around the village.

Cotterstock was the birthplace of John Graves Simcoe, the first Lieutenant Governor of Upper Canada from 1791 to 1796 and founder of Toronto, who was born here on 25 February 1752.

== Infrastructure ==
The village consists of a single street with Cotterstock Hall located in the centre and St Andrew's Church in the east. Cotterstock has a village hall.

== In the media ==
In 2010, Cotterstock Hall was used as a film set for 'The Woman in Black'. Star Daniel Radcliffe said of the Hall: "Cotterstock Hall is a remarkable building bursting with Gothic grandeur – perfect for The Woman In Black".
