= Francis Child (died 1763) =

English politician

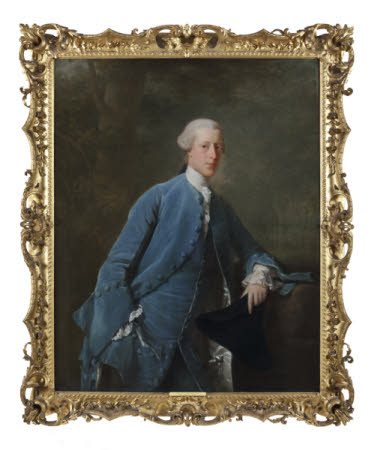
- Born: 1735
- Died: 1763 (aged 27–28)

Francis Child (c.1735-1763), of Osterley Park, Middlesex, was an English politician.

He was a member (MP) of the parliament of England for Bishop's Castle 1761 - 23 September 1763.
