= John Fane, 10th Earl of Westmorland =

British Tory politician

The Right Honourable The Earl of Westmorland KG PC
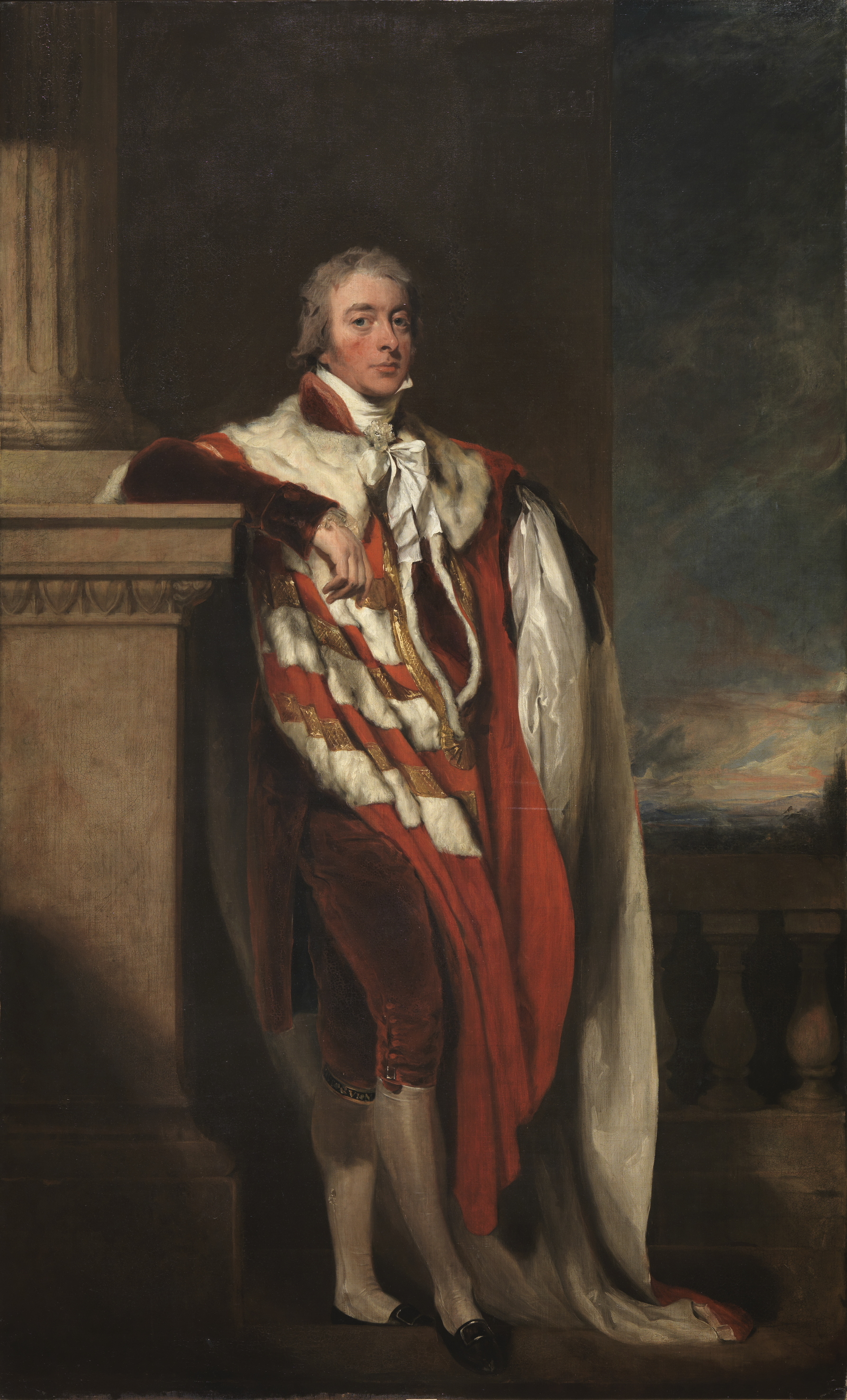
- Portrait of Lord Westmoreland by Thomas Lawrence, 1806

Lord Lieutenant of Ireland
- In office 1789–1794
- Monarch: George III
- Prime Minister: William Pitt the Younger
- Preceded by: The Marquess of Buckingham
- Succeeded by: The Earl FitzWilliam

Lord Privy Seal
- In office 14 February 1798 – 5 February 1806
- Monarch: George III
- Prime Minister: Pitt, Addington
- Preceded by: The Earl of Chatham
- Succeeded by: The Viscount Sidmouth
- In office 25 March 1807 – 30 April 1827
- Monarchs: George III; George IV
- Prime Minister: Portland, Perceval, Liverpool
- Preceded by: The Lord Holland
- Succeeded by: The Duke of Portland

Master of the Horse
- In office 14 January 1795 – 15 February 1798
- Monarch: George III
- Prime Minister: William Pitt the Younger
- Preceded by: The Duke of Montrose
- Succeeded by: The Earl of Chesterfield

Personal details
- Born: 1 June 1759
- Died: 15 December 1841 (aged 82)
- Party: Tory
- Spouses: Sarah Child (m. 1782; died 1793); Jane Saunders (m. 1800)
- Children: 10, including John, Sarah, Maria, Georgiana, and Henry
- Parents: John Fane, 9th Earl of Westmorland; Lady Augusta Bertie

John Fane, 10th Earl of Westmorland, KG, PC (1 June 1759 – 15 December 1841), styled Lord Burghersh between 1771 and 1774, was a British Tory politician of the late 18th and early 19th centuries, who served in most of the cabinets of the period, primarily as Lord Privy Seal ultimately spending 33 years in the Cabinet.

== Background ==
Westmorland was the son of John Fane, 9th Earl of Westmorland, and Lady Augusta Bertie, daughter of Capt. Lord Montagu Bertie (the seventh child of Robert Bertie, 1st Duke of Ancaster and Kesteven). He succeeded in the earldom on the death of his father in 1774.

== Military career ==
He served as a Captain in the Northamptonshire Militia when it was embodied for service during the American War of Independence. When the French Revolutionary War broke out in 1793 he was the regiment's Lieutenant-Colonel but did not serve with it because he was Lord Lieutenant of Ireland at the time. On his return to England he commanded the Northamptonshire Provisional Cavalry in 1797 with the rank of Colonel. At the beginning of the Napoleonic Wars in 1803 he raised the Oundle and Cliffe Volunteers and served as their colonel. When the British Volunteer Corps were replaced by the Local Militia in 1809 he was appointed colonel of the Western Regiment, Northamptonshire Local Militia.

== Political career ==
In 1789 Westmorland, appointed Joint Postmaster General by William Pitt the Younger (Prime Minister from 1783 to 1801), was sworn into the Privy Council; at the same time Pitt appointed him Lord Lieutenant of Ireland, a post he held until 1794. On 18 February 1793, he was appointed a deputy lieutenant of Northamptonshire. From 1795 to 1798 he was Master of the Horse under Pitt. In 1798 Pitt made him Lord Privy Seal, a position he would hold under five prime Ministers (Pitt, Addington, Pitt again, Portland, Perceval and Liverpool) for the next 35 years, except between 1806 and 1807 when Lord Grenville held the office.

A "fierce" defender of slavery, in 1799 Westmorland denounced in the House of Lords efforts by the British abolitionist movement to end Britain's involvement in the Atlantic slave trade. He served as Lord Lieutenant of Northamptonshire between 1828 and 1841. He became a Knight of the Garter in 1793.

== Family ==
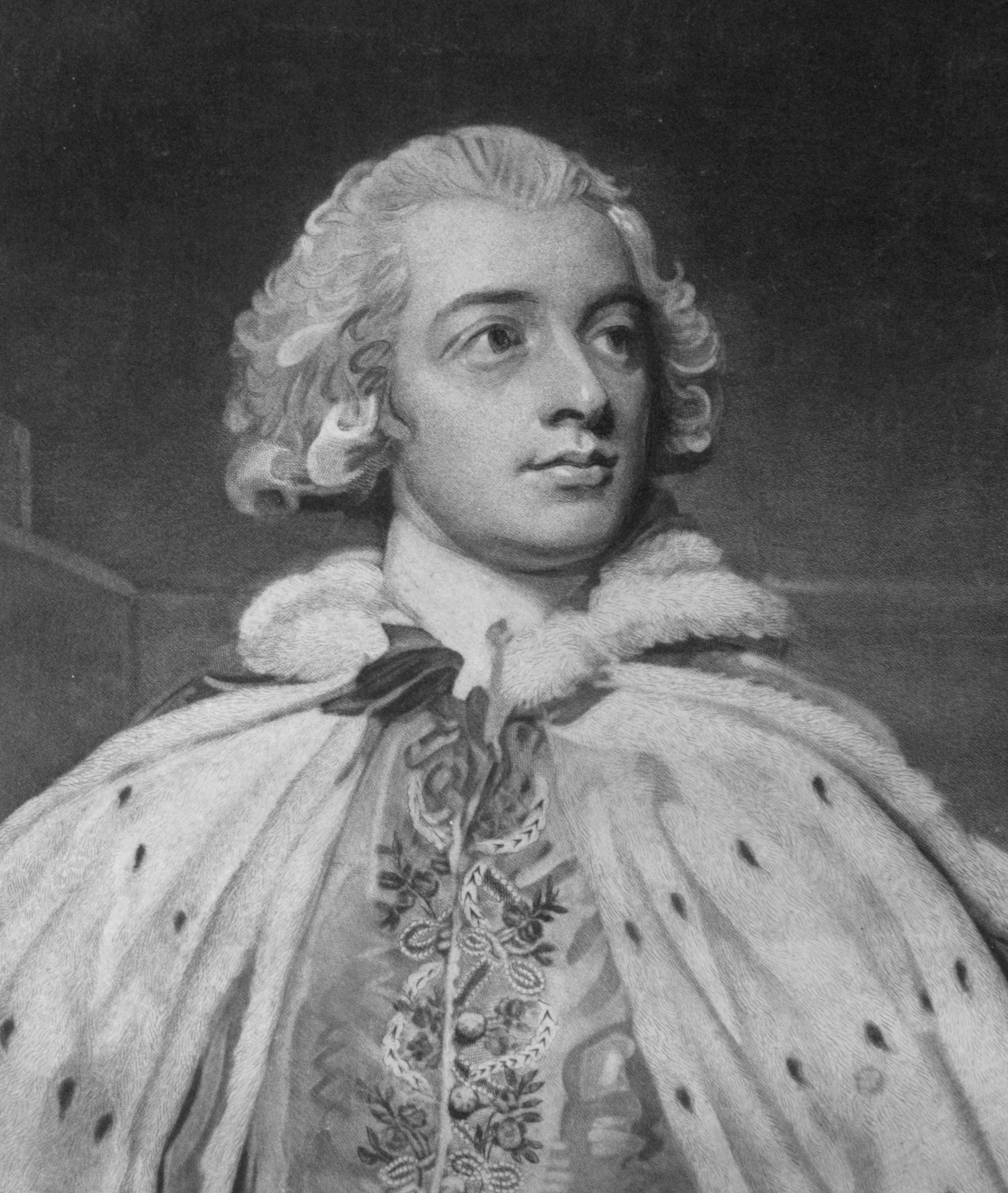
Detail of a mezzotint portrait by John Jones (circa 1745–1797) after George Romney of John Fane, 10th Earl of Westmorland, 1796.

Lord Westmorland married Sarah Anne Child (28 August 1764 – 9 November 1793), the only daughter and heiress of wealthy banker, Robert Child, against her father's wishes, at Gretna Green on 20 May 1782. Child consequently cut his daughter and her sons and their descendants out of his will, and made his daughter's daughters his heirs to prevent the Fanes from benefitting from this elopement. Their eldest daughter, Lady Sarah Sophia Fane (1785–1867), having thus been made testamentary heiress of her maternal grandfather, married George Child-Villiers, 5th Earl of Jersey, her husband assuming the additional surname of Child. The Earl and Countess of Westmorland had one son and four daughters:

- John Fane, 11th Earl of Westmorland (3 February 1784 – 16 October 1859), who succeeded his father.
- Lady Sarah Sophia Fane (4 March 1785 – 26 January 1867) who married in 1804 George Child Villiers, 5th Earl of Jersey and became heiress to the Child fortune.
- Lady Augusta Fane (1786–1871), who married firstly in 1804 (divorced 1809) Lord Boringdon, later Earl of Morley (by whom she was the mother of Henry Villiers Parker), and in 1809 Arthur Paget (1771–1840), a younger brother of Henry Paget, 1st Marquess of Anglesey.
- Lady Maria Fane (1787–1834) who in 1805 married Viscount Duncannon, later 4th Earl of Bessborough; their sixth son Spencer Ponsonby-Fane inherited Brympton d'Evercy from his half-aunt Lady Georgiana.
- Lady Charlotte Fane (1793–1822), died unmarried.

The Countess of Westmorland died relatively young in 1793, aged 29, from undisclosed causes. Lord Westmorland married secondly Jane, daughter of Richard Huck-Saunders, in 1800. After some years of marriage, they later separated and she lived at Brympton d'Evercy. By his second wife, he had three sons and two daughters, of whom only the eldest child Lady Georgiana Fane outlived both parents and inherited the Brympton estate.

- Lady Cecily Jane Georgiana Fane (25 January 1801 – 1875), died unmarried, leaving Brympton d'Evercy to her nephew Spencer Ponsonby-Fane
- Hon. Charles Saunders John Fane (1802–1810)
- Hon. Col. Henry Sutton Fane (1804–1857), died unmarried.
- Hon. Montagu Augustus Villiers Fane (1805–1857), died unmarried.
- Lady Evelina Fane (1807–1808)

Lord Westmorland died in December 1841, aged 82, and was succeeded in the earldom by his only son from his first marriage, John. The Countess of Westmorland died in March 1857.

== Arms ==
Coat of arms of John Fane, 10th Earl of Westmorland
Crest Out of a Ducal Coronet Or, a Bull's Head of Brindled colour, armed Or, charged on the neck with a Rose Gules. Escutcheon Quarterly, 1st and 4th, Azure three dexter gauntlets, backs afrontée or (for Fane); 2nd and 3rd, Argent three battering rams, barways in pale or, headed and garnished azure (for Bertie) Supporters Dexter: a Griffin per fess Argent and Or, collared and line reflexed over the back Sable. Sinister: a Pied or Brindled Bull, collared and line terminating in a Ring and three Staples Or. Motto Ne Vile Fano ("Disgrace Not The Altar"; Fane), Ne Vile Velis ("Form no mean wish"; Neville)

Political offices
Preceded by The Lord Carteret; The Lord Walsingham	Postmaster General; 1789; With: The Lord Walsingham	Succeeded by The Lord Walsingham; The Earl of Chesterfield
Preceded by The Marquess of Buckingham	Lord Lieutenant of Ireland; 1789–1794	Succeeded by The Earl FitzWilliam
Preceded by The Duke of Montrose	Master of the Horse; 1795–1798	Succeeded by The Earl of Chesterfield
Preceded by The Earl of Chatham	Lord Privy Seal; 1798–1806	Succeeded by The Viscount Sidmouth
Preceded by The Lord Holland	Lord Privy Seal; 1807–1827	Succeeded by The Duke of Portland
Honorary titles
Preceded by The Marquess of Northampton	Lord Lieutenant of Northamptonshire; 1828–1841	Succeeded by The Marquess of Exeter
Peerage of England
Preceded by John Fane	Earl of Westmorland; 1774–1841	Succeeded by John Fane
