= Brympton d'Evercy =

Manor house near Yeovil, Somerset, England

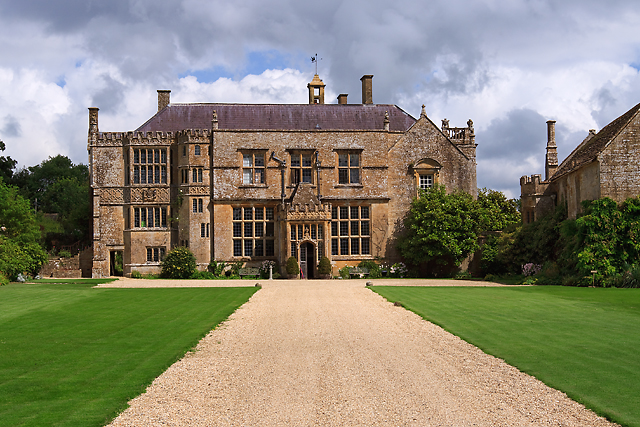
- Brympton d'Evercy

- Location within Somerset
- 50°56′10″N 2°41′06″W
- Type: Manor House
- Location: Brympton

Site notes
- Area: Somerset

Listed Building – Grade I
- Official name: Brympton d'Evercy Brympton House
- Designated: 19 April 1961
- Reference no.: 1057261

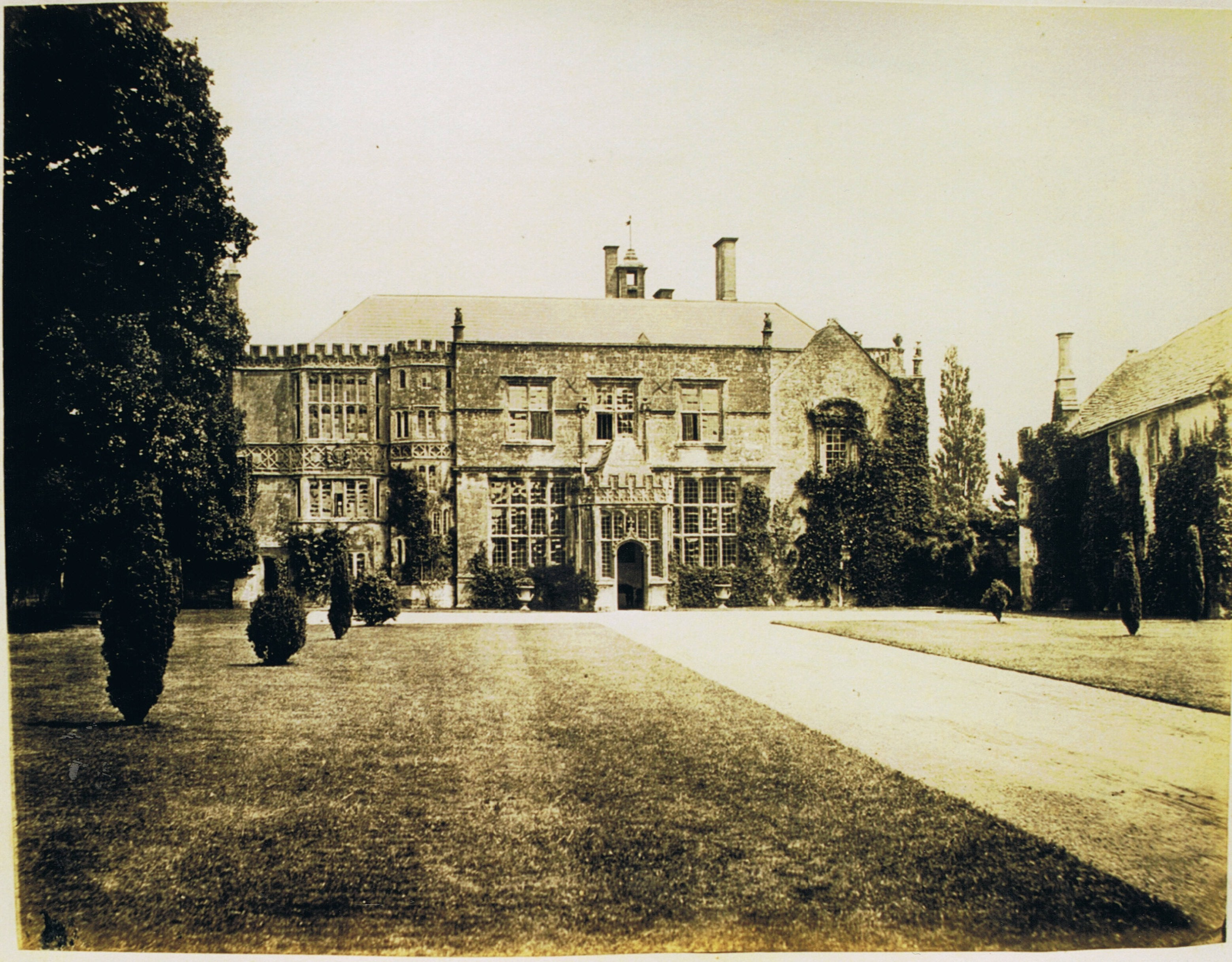
Entrance front, c. 1868

Brympton d'Evercy (alternatively Brympton House) is a Grade I listed manor house near Yeovil in the county of Somerset, England. The house has been called the most beautiful of its kind in England; in 1927, Christopher Hussey, near the start of a 50-year career as an architectural authority, termed it "the one which created the greatest impression and summarises so exquisitely English country life qualities." The house has belonged to six families since its construction: the D'Evercys, Stourtons, Sydenhams, Fanes, Weeks (1992–2008), and Glossops (since 2008).

== History ==
Building was begun by the D'Evercy family about 1220 and proceeded slowly into the 18th century. For 750 years it remained little known or recorded. For a few years after the Second World War it held a boys' school, before being reclaimed by its owners as a private house. This it remains, although it is occasionally hired out as a location for filming or a hospitality event.

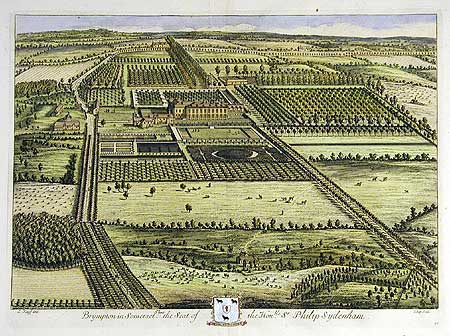
Brympton d'Evercy from the south around 1722, by Jan Kip and Leonard Knyff

The complex of buildings consists of the mansion, its stables and other outbuildings, the parish church and a puzzling building known as the Priest House. Little remains of the original D'Evercy manor built between 1220 and 1325, as the present house has evolved on the same site.

Brympton d'Evercy was listed in the Domesday Book of 1086 as Brunetone, meaning "brown enclosure", from the Old English brun and tun.

The village of Brympton is larger today than at any time in its history. Until the 20th century, it barely qualified as a village, having been largely deserted in the 14th century. Its few cottages were scattered along the drive to the secluded mansion, a few of which can be discerned in the view by Knyff (illustrated right). Today a new urban area known as Brympton is a suburb of Yeovil and encroaches on the seclusion of the house.

In Somerset and adjoining Dorset, many such houses as Brympton d'Evercy contain wings in several architectural styles by unrecorded local architects and builders. Their owners were nearly all related to each other in some way, and competition among them was great. As a result, the wings in various houses can be almost identical, having been constructed by the same builder, rather than an architect, using drawings based on the works of the master architects from as far afield as Rome. This applies particularly from the 17th century onwards.

Various owners of Brympton d'Evercy were related to the Stourtons of Preston Plucknett, the Pouletts of Hinton House, the Phelips of Montacute House, and the Strangways of Melbury House. The "county" families not actually akin were usually close friends, so that architectural ideas would be exchanged along with local gossip in frequent visits between them. Before the 17th century, the architect's profession was unknown, Sir John Summerson has observed: all houses were built by local builders following the ideas of their patrons. Inigo Jones, perhaps the first widely noted English architect, introduced Palladian ideals to English architecture: his Banqueting House at Whitehall of 1619 set a standard and was much copied. By the 1630s his ideas had permeated as far as Somerset.

In the grander families, there was generally a Member of Parliament, or as in the case of the Earls of Ilchester, the head of the family kept a London house. These more travelled members of provincial society would return to their Somerset estates and country houses with recent architectural ideas. Occasionally one of the richer county families would employ a renowned architect, such as John Webb, Jones's son-in-law. Born in Somerset, Webb moved to London, but after his cosmopolitan success worked in Dorset at Kingston Lacy – a new mansion, built by the Banks family to replace Corfe Castle, destroyed by Cromwellian troops in the Civil War. At Wilton House in neighbouring Wiltshire, Inigo Jones himself is believed to have put much into the design.

Once introduced into Somerset practice, the new genres of architecture were interpreted by local draughtsmen and masons, then applied, often haphazardly, to the old houses of the local gentry. In this way Brympton d'Evercy and its neighbours slowly evolved.

== Architectural appraisal ==
Brympton d'Evercy, stages of construction. A:Hall 1450; B:1460; C:Nether parlour 1520; D:Church 14th century; E:Priest House 15th century; F:West front 16th century G:Porch 1722 H:Clock tower (original porch); K:Staircase hall, possible site of earlier manor; L:State rooms 1680?; O:Kitchen 16th century; P:Farmhouse

For 250 years from 1434, the Sydenham family slowly created Brympton d'Evercy as it appears today. Each generation enlarged and altered the house according to whim or current fashion. The 130 feet (40 m)-long west front (shown at the top of the page) was built in the late Tudor period. Two large windows on either side of the door provide light for the double-height Great Hall, which was much increased in size by the new west front. The older north wing adjacent to the great hall probably contained the private rooms of its builder, John Sydenham.

The architecture of the house is as diverse as the people who influenced its appearance over 400 years. It is built entirely of the same local, golden-yellow hamstone found only in the buildings of a few villages close to Yeovil.

For the first few years of ownership, the Sydenhams appear content with the way it was when purchased from d'Evercy heirs. However, considerations of privacy and comfort that spread in English domestic architecture from the mid-15th century began to be applied, if only for the immediate family of the head of household. These are reflected at Brympton d'Evercy in the first major building works of the Sydenhams in 1460.

=== The 1460 wing ===
This first expansion of the original d'Evercy house, probably on the site of the present staircase hall ("K" on plan), occurred in 1460, when the Sydenhams added the south-west block ("B" on plan). This held the house's first reception rooms other than the hall, consisting of a solar and retiring or withdrawing rooms for the lord of the manor and his family. Until then the whole household would have lived and dined together in the hall. This wing has been much altered, having been given a new window arrangement in the 17th century, when the south wing was built. However, it retains its original mock battlements, which betray its age, as does a slight irregularity in the placements of the windows, compared to the perfect symmetry of the adjoining, later south wing.

=== The Priest House ===
The "Priest House" (marked E on plan): thought to have been built in 1460–1470 as a dower house by Joan Sydenham

In the late 15th century, a free-standing earlier structure (marked "E" on plan) was much enhanced; it flanks the mansion almost as though it were a wing of the house itself. Its origins and uses have long been debated. Possibly this was the chantry said to have been built by the D'Evercy family. Though it is known traditionally as the Priest House, its entrance faces away from the church, into the former forecourt of the 15th-century house. According to one account, "It may originally have been a range of lodgings for retainers or guests." Whatever its original use, it seems certain that it was remade as a dower house by Joan Stourton, who had married John Sydenham in 1434, not realising that her own son would predecease her, so allowing her to remain in the main house for the rest of her life.

The building is a rare example of a complete small medieval country house, an oblong structure on two floors, the upper containing a hall, solar and bedroom, while the lower for servants had no internal means of reaching the upper floor, to which access was obtained by a newel staircase in a turret opening outside. The house, obviously designed for a person of refinement, had unusually good sanitation in the form of two garderobes; the wooden chutes were still in existence in the early 20th century. The siting of the garderobes here facing the church reinforces the idea that this was the rear of the house; no such arrangement would have been made if this were truly the Priest's House. In the 17th century its principal room on the upper storey was given a decorative plaster ceiling.

Upstairs is a tessellated Roman pavement of blue lias limestone and red tile. This was excavated in 1923 by Ralegh Radford from a building near Westland Road in Yeovil.

=== The North or Henry VIII wing ===
The next major addition to the house was the north wing ("C" on plan). Its turret, oriels and external sculpted moulding make it almost a miniature country house in itself. This wing has remained largely unchanged since it was built about 1520. John Sydenham wished to retain an independent lodging at the house after its handover. He built for himself three floors with a room on each, its own external entrance and staircase turret – a house within a house. Architecturally it must have been strikingly modern at the time. The façade is richly ornamented with coats-of-arms and tracery. The roof line is castellated, the battlements purely for ornament, not defence. The two upper floors have large oriel windows; between these is the finely sculpted the coat of arms of King Henry VIII. This the Sydenhams were permitted displaying due to their relationship to the Stourton family, who claimed connections with the blood royal. Thus this part of the house is sometimes called the Henry VIII wing, though the King never visited. Of all the house's varied wings, this north is probably the most architecturally accomplished, displaying the most up-to-date traits and flamboyance of contemporary Tudor architecture.

=== West Front ===
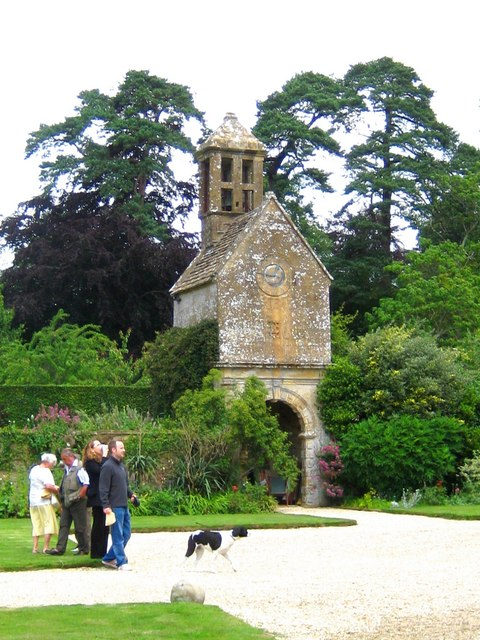
The clock tower ("H" on plan): the base was formerly the Tudor entrance porch to the house. It was given an upper storey and moved to its current place in 1722.

The central section of the west front contains on the ground floor the hall (marked "A" on the plan); the rear section of the hall almost certainly was once the great hall of the original smaller d'Evercy manor rebuilt by the Sydenhams in 1450. The great hall, though, did not achieve its present size until the building of the west front ("F" on plan) in the late 16th century. The new front projects further forward than the previous, so that the older turret of the north wing became less obvious, as three-quarters of its mass was absorbed into the enlarged hall. The west front has two large mullioned double-height windows flanking the principal entrance. The present glazed Gothick castellated porch (G on plan) was added in 1722, when the existing 15th-century porch was moved into the garden, given an extra storey and transformed into a clock tower ("H" on plan). The hall's central open fire, was replaced by a fireplace complete with chimney, so that it became possible to place a second floor above the hall.

=== The kitchen wing ===
The next major addition, still in 16th century, was the kitchen block ("O" on plan), notable for its huge proportions and barrel vaulted roof, suggesting an original function less humble than a kitchen. The kitchen is on two levels, the upper reached by a flight of short steps from the lower at each side of its width, yet the space does not appear ever to have been divided. From the kitchen range projects a turret (on the right hand between O and K on the plan) containing a spiral staircase, crowned by a belfry. This would have originally given a second access to the upper floor of the original house, now replaced by the Palladian south wing. From the kitchen stretches another wing ("P" on plan) of indeterminate date (no later than 1690). This seems always to have been known as the Farmhouse and inhabited by the family of the home-farm tenant. It may possibly have been intended as a secondary or service wing, or even part of a grander, never-completed scheme.

=== South Front and wing ===
The south wing, which finally gave the mansion its present appearance, is no better documented than the rest of the house. Opinion on the exact date of construction of the wing is divided ("L" on plan) between 1670 and 1680, with some suggesting it had been started as early as 1636 or the early years of the Restoration of 1660. Dating the wing is essential to identifying the architect: the south wing, if considered to date from the 1630s, was often attributed to Inigo Jones – many English houses make this claim, some like Wilton House with more plausibility than others – until Christopher Hussey debunked the myth in 1927, largely based on the assumption that the south wing was completed in 1680, when Jones would have been dead for 20 years. The most noticeable similarity between Jones's documented work and Brympton d'Evercy is the use of alternating triangular and segmental window pediments, but Jones only ever used this motif to give importance to the windows of the piano nobile, for at Brympton d'Evercy the alternating pediments give both floors equal value. The piano nobile at Brympton is most unusual in being on the ground floor. It is doubtful that a master architect who had designed for the royal family, and the highest echelons of the aristocracy, would have considered such a placing. Also typical of Jones, but a common feature of the time, is the balustrade parapet hiding a hipped roof. However, the greatest architectural clues that suggest Jones had no hand in the design of the mansion are basic ones: the architect of Brympton d'Evercy gave the façade 10 bays, which means the windows begin with a segmental pediment and end with a triangular one, and no master architect would have permitted such an affront to balance. Finally, as the house is of ten bays, it has no central focus: this is not an architectural crime, but what is such is that the South front in its centre has a focal point: a drain pipe sited there since the building's completion. The evidence would suggest that the South facade was inspired by Hinton House, at nearby Hinton St George, the childhood home of Sir John Posthumous Sydenham's wife, completed in 1638. These two houses, along with Long Ashton House, were probably designed and built by the same local family of architects and masons, working from drawings by Serlio's treatise on architecture, which had been published in five volumes in London in 1611.

=== Baroque state apartments ===
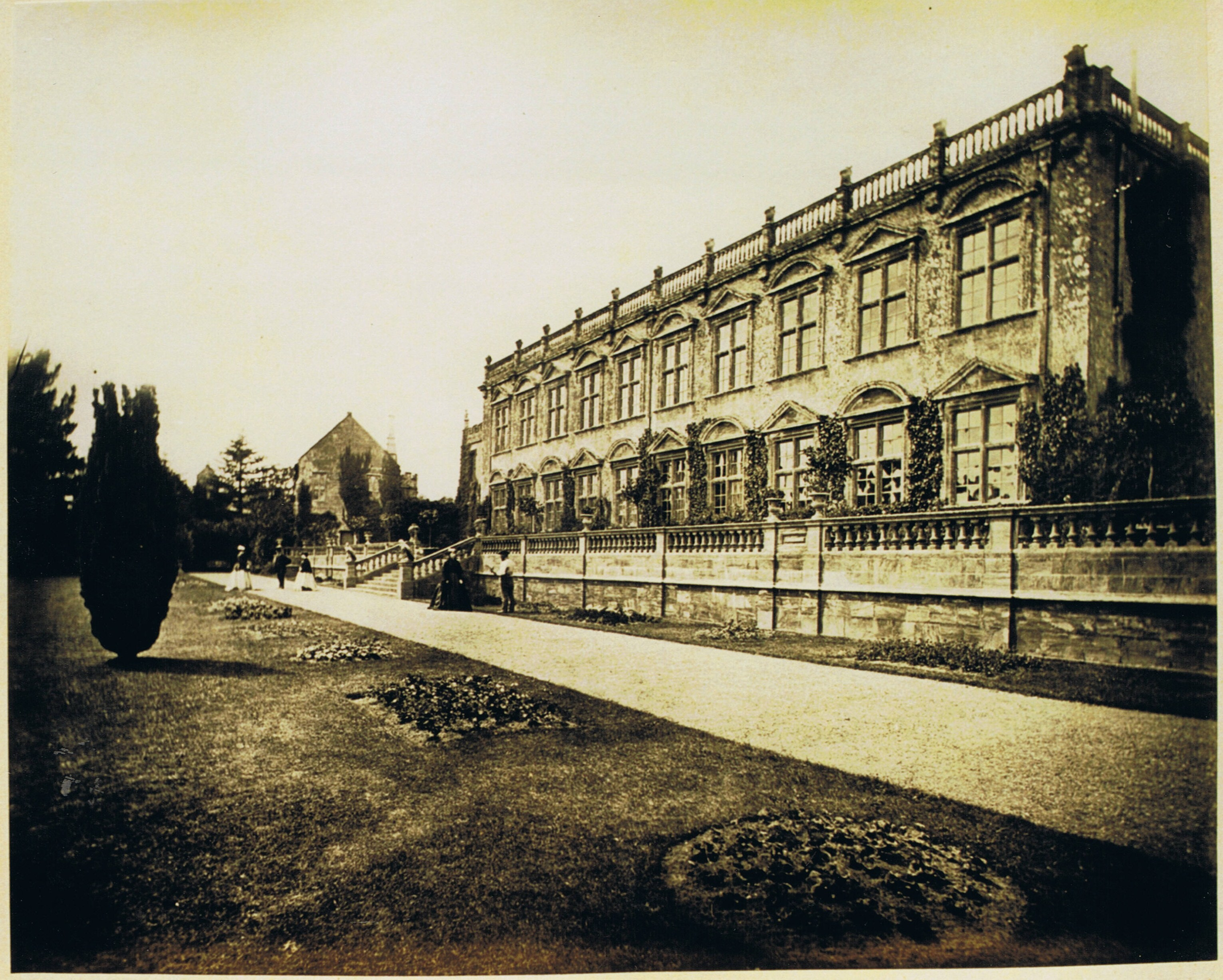
Garden front, c. 1860

Whoever the architect was, the new south wing was intended to transform Brympton d'Evercy from a country manor into a grand house. Of ten bays, the two-storied building housed on its ground floor the finest and most lavishly decorated rooms of the house. Known as the state apartments, they follow an arrangement common in houses built before about 1720, where important guests were lodged: a series of rooms in a strict order of precedence. A large bedroom suite or apartment, with all rooms on an axis, was connected by large double doors to create an enfilade. The first, largest and grandest room, known as the salon, was intended for a visiting dignitary to grant audience to the household, all of whom would be given access to this room. Then comes a large withdrawing room, slightly less grand; here the guest would receive people more privately than in the saloon. The next room followed the same pattern, each space becoming more intimate and private as the enfilade progressed. The final and most private room was the state bedroom: beyond this were two small closets for staff and private ablutions.

This pattern of Baroque apartments exists in large houses all over England. In the very largest, such as Blenheim Palace, it could have two such suites branching from either side of the saloon, but Brympton d'Evercy was not such a grand house. Why it needed a suite of state apartments has never been settled. Often presumed is an intended visit by Queen Anne, but they were at the very least ten years old when she ascended the throne, and she certainly never made such a visit. The state bed remained in situ until 1956, but was never slept in by a sovereign. About 1720, such state rooms became old-fashioned and often transformed for more general and frequent use. At Brympton d'Evercy the saloon became the Drawing Room, the following room became known as the Oak or Small Drawing Room, and the next room the Dining Room. Only the state bedroom remained in solitary magnificence, slept in by honoured, if non-royal guests. At Brympton d'Evercy these were more likely to be talented cricketers than potentates.

=== 19th-century works ===
In the mid-19th century, Brympton d'Evercy was the home of Lady Georgiana Fane, the daughter of John Fane, 10th Earl of Westmorland, a single lady of modest means who had no need of a large and lavish household. The house was not given the Victorian wings added so carelessly to many historic houses. Lady Georgiana confined herself to improving the gardens and grounds. She added a balustrade to the walls enclosing the forecourt in front of the west facade; the walls, topped by balustrading, link the Priest House, the churchyard on the south side, and the clock-tower and stables on the north. The effect was to create what in a grander house than Brympton d'Evercy would be known as a cour d'honneur. Entered through great gate piers crowned by urns (see the illustration at the top of page), such an effect is softened and de-formalised by lawns and some very English-style flower beds. The broad gravel terrace across the south front was also created at this time, along with the large pond which reflects it. Other than necessary restoration work and modern plumbing and electricity, little has been added to the house since the 19th century. It has been recognised by English Heritage as a grade I listed building since 1961.

== Owners and occupiers ==
=== The D'Evercys ===
The D'Evercy family were responsible for building the almost adjoining church. Christopher Hussey suggests that the D'Evercy's manor at Brympton was little more than an unostentatious range of buildings on the site of that part of the present staircase wing (marked K on plan), with an adjoining farmyard to the north of it. The remains of a farm exist on the probable site of the D'Evercy's farm today, and an old farmhouse (marked P on plan) adjoins the much later south wing built on the probable site of the original manor. Thomas d'Evercy purchased the estate in 1220 from the Chilterne family (of whom nothing is known). The d'Evercy family derived their name from Evrecy, a village near Caen in Normandy. Thomas d'Evercy was part of the retinue of the Norman Earl of Devon, which is the reason he left the family estates on the Isle of Wight to reside in Somerset. D'Evercy represented Somerset and South Hampshire at the first Parliament of England. Following Thomas d'Evercy's death, family records are scarce until the time of the last d'Evercy, Sir Peter, who twice represented Somerset in Parliament, under Edward II. The church next to the house, St Andrew's, dates from this period. Sir Peter founded a chantry at Brympton d'Evercy in 1306, endowing a priest with a messuage and 40 acres (160,000 m^{2}) in the parish. It has been suggested that this is the building today known as the Priest House, but no structural evidence exists to support this claim. Sir Peter died in 1325, when the estate was described as "a certain capital messuage, with gardens and closes adjoining". The village at the time contained 17 smallholders and three tenant farmers. Sir Peter's widow remained in occupation, and on her death the estate passed to the Glamorgan family, the d'Evercy's daughter Amice having married John de Glamorgan. Later it seems to have passed through obscure descent to the Wynford family, of whom nothing other than their names is recorded. In 1343 the estate was recorded as "a manor house sufficiently built with a certain garden adjoining planted with divers and many apple trees, the whole covering some two acres." The record goes on to record some forty householders all charged to serve their lord as "village blacksmith, drover or domestic servant". This was the highest population the village was to have until the late 20th century.

=== The Sydenhams ===
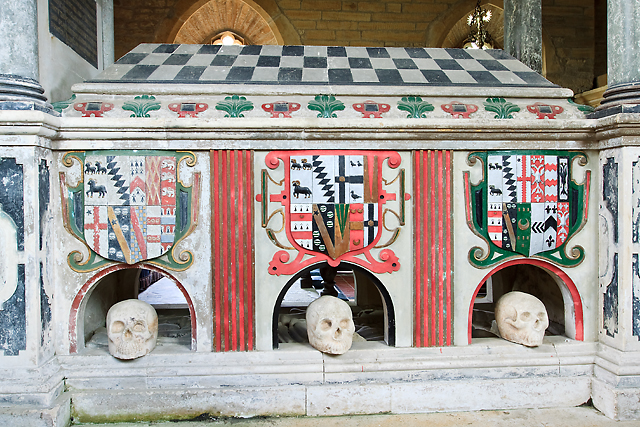
The tomb of John Sydenham

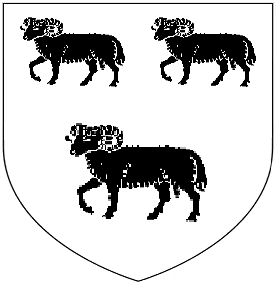
Arms of Sydenham: Argent, three rams passant guardant sable

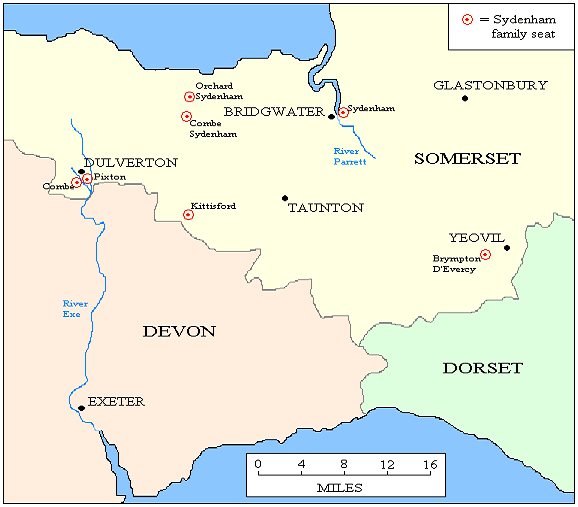
Map showing locations of historic seats of the Sydenham family of Somerset: Sydenham; Orchard Sydenham; Combe Sydenham; Brympton d'Evercy; Combe, Dulverton; Pixton

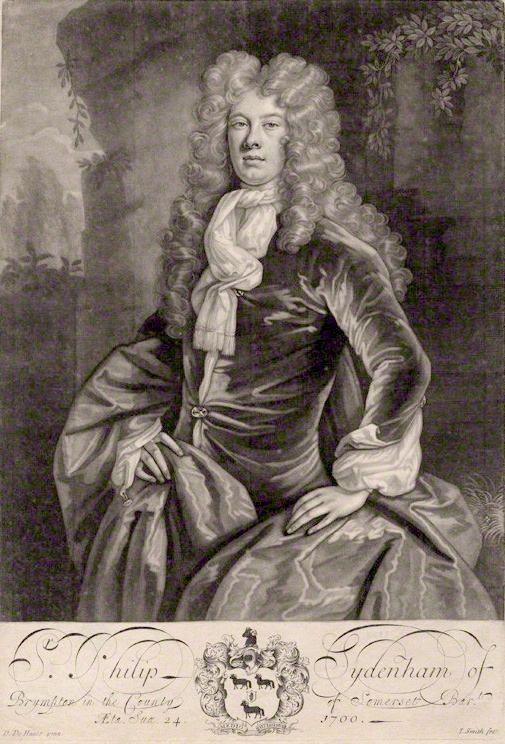
Sir Philip Sydenham, 3rd Baronet (1676–1739), the last Sydenham to reside at Brympton d'Evercy.

In 1430 following a legal battle over disputed titles, the Wynfords sold the reversion of the estate to John Stourton (died 1438) of Preston Plucknett in Somerset, 7 times MP for Somerset, in 1419, 1420, December 1421, 1423, 1426, 1429 and 1435. Stourton used it as a dowry for his second daughter Joan Stourton (one of his three daughters and co-heiresses) when in 1434 she married John Sydenham MP, of Combe Sydenham in Somerset. The Sydenham family originated at the manor of Sydenham near Bridgwater, Somerset and were said at one time to have been England's largest landowners, yet their wealth seems to have fluctuated with each generation.

John Sydenham as an infant inherited the estate from his grandmother, the original Joan Sydenham (née Stourton). However, Brympton D'Evercy was not the principal family residence at this time. In 1534 John Sydenham made over the house to his son, also, John – having first built the North wing to be his private lodgings for later visits. The new owner John III, was a great landowner bequeathing to each of his many children an estate. This lack of primogeniture proved to be the Sydenham's downfall. John III's successor John IV (died 1585), and his son John V (died 1625) were considerably less wealthy than their forebears, and used the house as their sole residence, the result of which was, despite their comparative penury, they added much to the house. John IV built the present west front thus enlarging the hall, and John V built the large kitchen block.

Sir John Posthumous Sydenham ("Posthumous" because born after the death of his father) built the south wing in the 17th century. He married Elizabeth Poulett, a descendant of Sir Amias Paulet, and member of one of Somerset's oldest and most notable families. The Pouletts lived at nearby Hinton House at Hinton St George. Sir John died in 1696, having severely depleted the family's already precarious fortunes by building the house's state apartments.

Sir John was succeeded by his son Philip, a weak spendthrift, but also a Member of Parliament for Somerset. At the time membership of Parliament was an expensive rich man's occupation and the Sydenham's money was running out. By 1697 Philip Sydenham was attempting to sell the estate for a price between £16,000 and £20,000. In the event of no purchaser being found, Sydenham mortgaged the estate to Thomas Penny, the Receiver-General of Somerset who collected Somerset's taxes for the crown.

Penny made a few alterations to the mansion: he added the castellated and glazed porch to the South front, removing the earlier porch to the garden, where it became a clock tower. He also and made a new entrance to the Priest House. Penny then suffered a blow to his own fortunes: he was found to be rather cavalier in passing on the taxes he collected to the Crown, and was dismissed from office. He died in 1730 having executed no further work to the estate. The house and estate were then put up for auction in 1731 and sold for £15,492.10s.

=== The Fanes ===
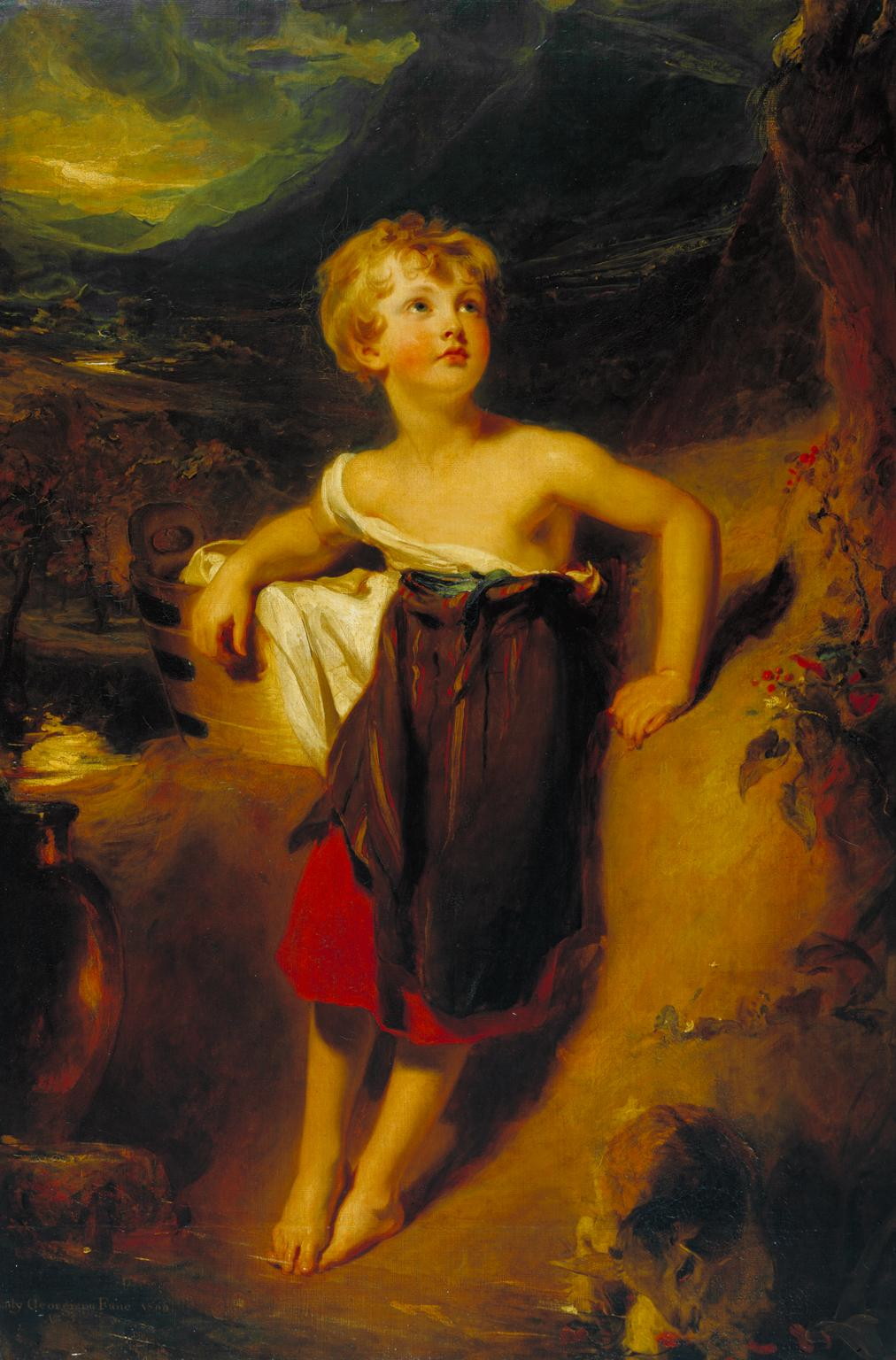
Lady Georgiana Fane as a child, by Sir Thomas Lawrence

The new owner was Francis Fane, a barrister and Member of Parliament. The Fanes completed the interior decoration of the state rooms, but other than that they are remarkable only for various eccentricities rather than their structural alterations. Francis Fane lived at Brympton d'Evercy for 26 years before bequeathing it to his brother Thomas, who became the 8th Earl of Westmorland. Thus again the house became a secondary residence and seemingly left largely empty until the time of John 10th Earl. This amorous adventurer had taken as his second wife Jane Saunders, the surgeon Richard Saunders Huck's daughter, who was so wildly eccentric that Charles Fox described her as "perhaps not mad, but nobody ever approached so near it with so much reason." The Countess decided to shock conventional society and leave her husband, taking her daughter Lady Georgiana Fane with her. This unconventional pair of ladies set up home at Brympton d'Evercy. The countess was responsible for installing the classical fireplaces which remain today, and assembling the furniture and art collection that were not dispersed until in a large sale in the late 1950s.

Lady Georgiana Fane, like her mother of a lively disposition, declined a proposal of marriage from Lord Palmerston, preferring instead to conduct a liaison with the Duke of Wellington. This relationship with the Iron Duke is her chief claim to fame. A cousin of Wellington's friend Mrs. Arbuthnot, Lady Georgiana too became a close friend of the Duke; however, in later life she claimed the Duke had reneged on a promise to marry her. At that time this was a civil offence; she also threatened to publish the Duke's love letters to her. By the strict Victorian standards of the day this would have been a national scandal. The affair was "hushed up," but a letter exists from the Duke of Wellington to Lady Georgiana's mother urging her "to prevail upon her daughter to cease molesting him with daily vituperative letters." It has also been claimed that Lady Georgiana in fact refused the young future Duke of Wellington's proposal, on the grounds she could not marry so lowly a soldier. Another version of the same story is that Lady Georgiana's father the 10th Earl of Westmorland forbade the marriage of his daughter to an untitled soldier with apparently limited prospects. Both of these stories, however, must be apocryphal, as Lady Georgiana never knew him before he was a "great man". She was born in 1801; Wellington (then Sir Arthur Wellesley) was married in 1806, and was created a duke in 1814. His wife died in 1831. Lady Georgiana began pursuing him some time after that. The Countess died 26 March 1857. Lady Georgiana lived on as the sole châtelaine of Brympton: her bedroom in the North wing retained her name until the 20th century. She altered the house little, but was responsible for the large pond in the garden, and some other improvements in the grounds. She died 4 December 1874, leaving the heavily indebted estate to her nephew the Hon. Spencer Ponsonby, younger son of the 4th Earl of Bessborough

=== The Ponsonby-Fanes ===
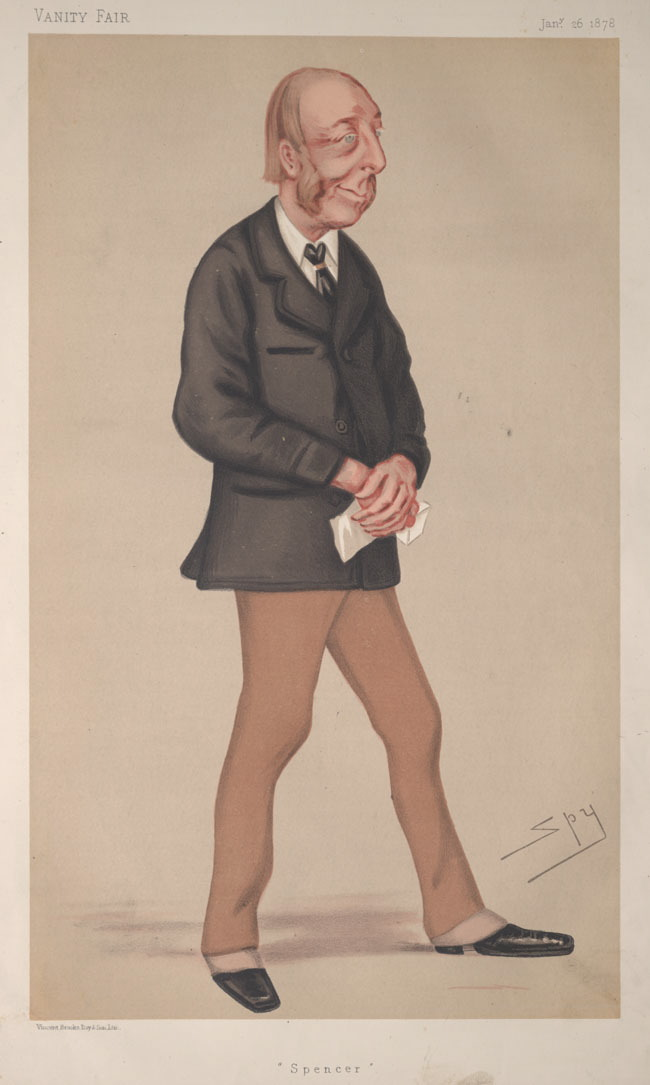
Cartoon of Rt. Hon. Sir Spencer Ponsonby-Fane (1824–1915)

Spencer Ponsonby, at the time in Ireland with his elder brother Frederick, escaping a court subpoena for an indiscretion, at first refused to receive the telegram informing him of his inheritance, assuming it was for his elder brother. Indiscretion appears to have been habitual in this family: Lady Caroline Lamb was his aunt. Fane family legend, and most reference books relate that the two brothers cut cards to decide who was to return to face the British courts and the debt-ridden estate, Spencer Ponsonby picked the lower card and returned to claim his inheritance: he is said to have seen Brympton d'Evercy and vowed to retain it at all costs. Whatever the truth of the legend, Spencer Ponsonby, newly renamed Spencer Ponsonby-Fane (in accordance with Lady Georgiana Fane's last wishes), was a pillar of the British establishment, one-time private secretary to Lord Palmerston, and later comptroller of Buckingham Palace in the reign of King Edward VII. However it was cricket that was his first love, although he did father eleven children.

Through Sir Spencer Ponsonby-Fane Brympton d'Evercy became a meeting place of cricket lovers. It had its own cricket pitch, where large house parties played against local and visiting teams. A house party devoted to cricket took place each year, a tradition which survived long after Sir Spencer's death and into the 1950s. As treasurer of the MCC, Sir Spencer laid the foundation stone for the pavilion at Lord's. He founded the Old Stagers club of Canterbury, and most eccentrically the team known as I Zingari, a wandering cricket club of assorted aristocrats and Victorian and Edwardian notables. Throughout Sir Spencer's ownership of Brympton the house and estate were maintained, but survived only through the good fortune of low taxation and agricultural rents. This branch of the Fane family had never been wealthy, and the First World War was to bring sweeping changes to not just Brympton d'Evercy but country houses all over Britain.

The stables built in 1720, in the north west corner of the forecourt; the doors have massive Palladian pediments, while the windows have typical Somerset style provincial lintels.

Spencer Ponsonby-Fane died in 1915, leaving his estate to his eldest son John, who in turn died just a year after inheriting, leaving the estate to his son Richard. Richard Ponsonby-Fane was an aesthetic intellectual and also an invalid. Unmarried, he chose to spend most of the year in Japan, a subject on which he published several books and papers. Until his death in 1937, he returned to England and Brympton d'Evercy for just a few weeks of each summer in order to follow the cricket. In his prolonged absences, the house was occupied by his sister Violet and her husband Captain Edward Clive, a descendant of Clive of India. Violet Clive, the next owner of the property, has been described as "a grand eccentric and remarkable woman [who] played hockey for the west of England, rowed for the Leander Club, was a master carpenter and keen landscape gardener." She was a keen gardening ally of the influential writer Margery Fish at nearby East Lambrook Manor. Apart from an annual day trip to London to the Chelsea Flower Show and a short annual holiday at her fishing lodge in Ireland, she seldom left Brympton d'Evercy, preferring to spend her days in endless gardening in the style of Gertrude Jekyll. This quiet existence admirably suited the family's finances, because on her death in 1955, her only son and heir Nicholas Clive-Ponsonby-Fane was forced to sell the contents of the house. This large collection of fine art and antiques had been assembled by the Countess of Westmorland and Lady Georgiana Fane. After the sale the Clive-Ponsonby-Fane family moved to the nearby old vicarage.

=== Westcroft Preparatory School ===
From 1939 to 1940, Westcroft Preparatory School was housed at Brympton, having been evacuated from Cricklewood in north London.

=== Sale of contents, 1956 ===
The contents of the house were sold by auction under a marquee outside the house over a five-day period of 26 November – 1 December 1956. Described extensively, if a little quaintly, by the auctioneers John D Wood & Co. of London as "including interesting examples of 16th, 17th and 18th centuries, a fine set of George II chairs, Queen Anne and Chippendale mirrors, cabinets, chests, tables, buffets, sets of chairs, clocks, Jacobean needlework, French commodes, vitrines, tables and numerous other period piece... old paintings and a library of books." In truth the collection included items of national importance, but the 1950s were an era of destruction and dismantling of British country houses, and such sales were not uncommon, as was exemplified in the Destruction of the Country House exhibition of 1974. Among the 909 paintings described as old masters were works by Thomas Lawrence, including a version of his state portrait of George IV, and his portrait of the 10th Earl of Westmorland, proving the earl's estranged wife did not totally forget him. Also in the sale were numerous works by Kneller, Romney, Lely, Snyders and at least ten attributed to Van Dyke: the paintings are listed in the "contents of the house" together with Tudor, Chippendale, Sheraton and Louis XV furniture, and an "assortment of bed sheets", "3 new towels and an "old bedspread".

The sale was reported with due gravity and deference by the provincial press. "The 400 chairs provided for the convenience of the buyers proved insufficient to accommodate the company.... Top price of the week was £2000 for a Chinese dinner service... many of the pieces being badly damaged... a pair of Chippendale mirrors £1,350... a small carpet £800". And so the list continued, detailing the prices fetched for Brympton d'Evercy's former treasures, including first editions of works by Charles Dickens and Daniel Defoe. On the last day of the sale an iron garden seat was sold for £14. Prices for the paintings are not recorded in the article except one of those "after" Vandyck, which fetched £85.

=== Clare School ===
The Clive-Ponsonby-Fane family retained a few of the family portraits and smaller items of furniture and in 1957, after the sale, moved into a smaller house nearby. The big house stood empty for two years before being let to Clare School in 1959.

Clare School taught boys, both as boarders and day pupils aged 13–18, and also had its own prep school at Coker Court, East Coker, for boys from the age of seven.

Nicholas Clive-Ponsonby-Fane continued to own the house and what remained of the estate until his sudden death in 1963, at the age of 49. The estate then passed into the possession of his widow Petronilla Clive-Ponsonby-Fane and their son Charles (born 1941). He took over control of his inheritance after his mother remarried in 1967. Meanwhile, Clare School continued its use of the main house until 1974, when it moved to Crowcombe Court, also in Somerset, which it occupied between 1974 and 1976.

=== The Clive-Ponsonby-Fanes ===
Circa 1900: A boating party on the "pond" created by Lady Georgiana Fane in the mid 19th century

In 1974, Charles Clive-Ponsonby-Fane married Judy Bushby and reclaimed his ancestral home. With his new wife, he moved back into Brympton d'Evercy, with the plan of restoring it and opening it to the public as a stately home. His problem was that, while the empty and neglected house may have been his home, it was far from stately. The house was structurally in a fair condition, but it had not been redecorated since the 18th century and had endured the obvious ravages caused by its use as a boys' school for some 15 years. The redecoration of the state rooms was done on a very limited budget. The principal problem facing the owners was furnishing the house. Few of its former contents remained, and while Brympton d'Evercy is not on a par with Blenheim Palace in size, it still required large items and quantities of high-quality antique furniture, and this proved to be the stumbling block to opening it successfully to stately home visitors. The Clive-Ponsonby-Fanes made great efforts to draw in the crowds, with an agricultural museum, a vineyard, and a distillery of apple brandy, but none of this was interesting enough to attract visitors from as far afield as London, let alone from overseas. Ultimately, as a financial enterprise, opening to the public failed. In 1992, after owning the house for almost 300 years, the family sold Brympton d'Evercy. The situation was summed up at the time by the satirist Auberon Waugh: "Last week we learnt that the most beautiful house in Somerset has been sold.... It is sad of course for the family who owned it, who had made a valiant effort to keep it going.... It did not succeed as a showpiece: they had run out of money, the internal decorations were dreadful, and they lacked the proper kit to make it look like anything more than a prep school on open day. So now the most beautiful house in England will be a private family home once again...."

== In the 21st century ==
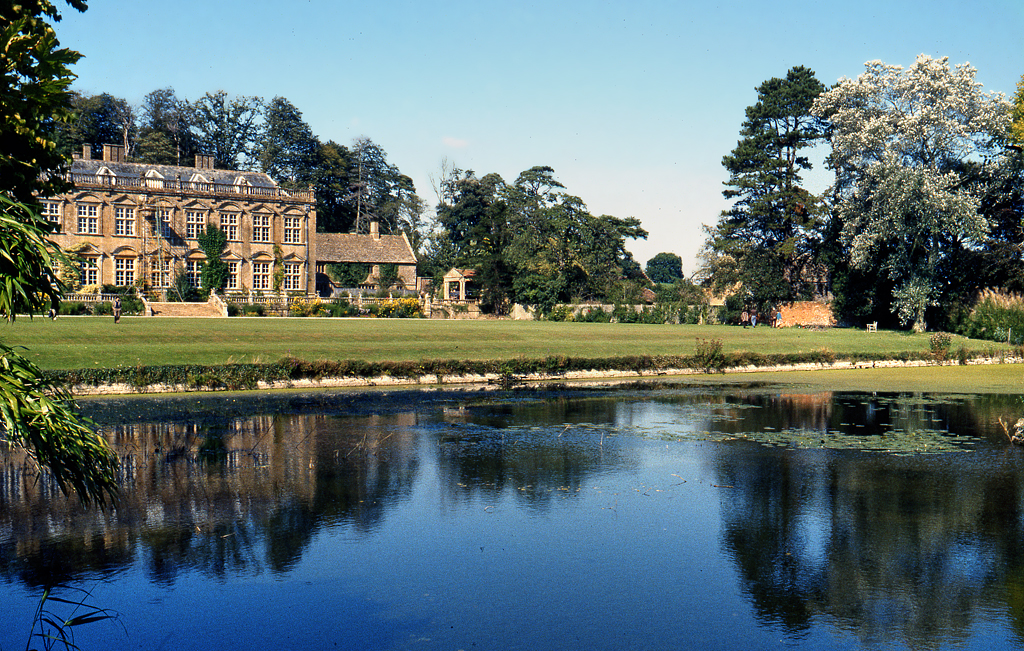
Brympton in 1973

The house now stands in 33 acres (13.4 ha) of parkland and is now primarily used as a wedding venue. Marriages can take place at St Andrew's Church nearby or in the house. Receptions and functions can also be held in the grounds, including the 17th-century stables, and there are 31 bedrooms available for such occasions. Brympton d'Evercy has also been hired as a film location.

The gardens are listed Grade II* on the Register of Historic Parks and Gardens of special historic interest in England.

=== In popular culture ===
The Turn of the Screw, a 2009 adaptation by the BBC of classic Henry James novel starring Michelle Dockery and Dan Stevens, was filmed at the house and grounds.
