= St Andrew's Church, Brympton =

Church in Somerset, England

Church of St Andrew
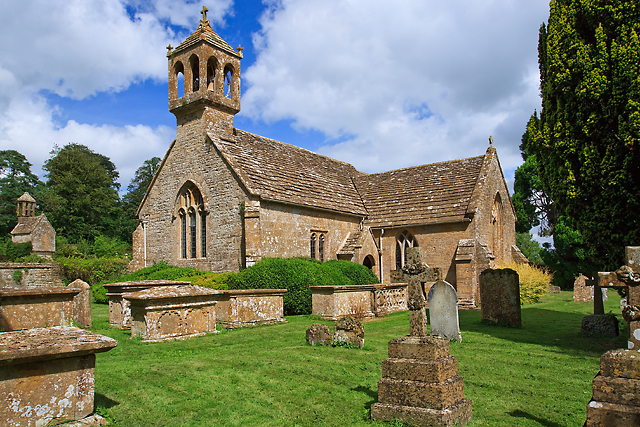

- Location within Somerset
- 50°56′06″N 2°41′02″W
- Location: Brympton, Somerset, England

History
- Built: 13th century

Listed Building – Grade I
- Official name: Church of St Andrew
- Designated: 19 April 1961
- Reference no.: 1057269

The Church of St Andrew in Brympton, Somerset, England, dates from the 13th century and has been designated as a Grade I listed building.

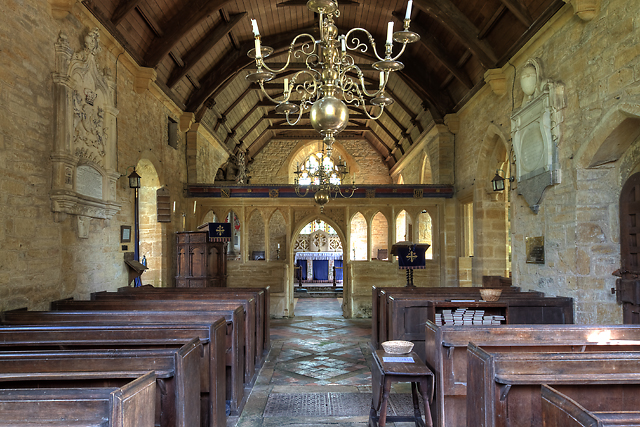
The interior of the nave

It is closely associated with the manor house of Brympton d'Evercy. The d'Evercy family were responsible for building the church. Thomas d'Evercy purchased the estate in 1220. Sir Peter founded a chantry at Brympton d'Evercy in 1306, endowing a priest with a messuage and 40 acres (16 ha) in the parish. New aisles were added in 1469.

It has been suggested that this is the building today known as the priest house, but no structural evidence exists to support this claim. The church contains monuments to Sir John Sydenham (died 1626) and his family who were lords of the manor.

Some of the effigies within the church were originally in the churchyard but were moved into the church in the 19th century and restored by John Edward Carew.

The parish is within the benefice of Odcombe with Brympton, Lufton and Montacute, which is within the deanery of Yeovil.

== See also ==
- Brympton d'Evercy
- Grade I listed buildings in South Somerset
- List of Somerset towers
- List of ecclesiastical parishes in the Diocese of Bath and Wells
