= William Pinner =

English cricketer

Personal information
- Full name: William Gladstone Pinner
- Born: 26 July 1877; Wednesbury, Staffordshire, England
- Died: 6 July 1944 (aged 66); Wednesbury, Staffordshire, England
- Batting: Unknown
- Bowling: Unknown

Domestic team information
- Years: Team
- 1900–1908: Northamptonshire

Career statistics
Competition	First-class
Matches	1
Runs scored	26
Batting average	26.00
100s/50s	–/–
Top score	24
Balls bowled	18
Wickets	–
Bowling average	–
5 wickets in innings	–
10 wickets in match	–
Best bowling	–
Catches/stumpings	–/–
- Source: Cricinfo, 17 November 2011

William Gladstone Pinner (26 September 1877 – 6 July 1944) was an English cricketer. Pinner's batting and bowling styles are unknown. He was born at Wednesbury, Staffordshire.

Pinner made his debut for Northamptonshire in the 1900 Minor Counties Championship against the Surrey Second XI. He played Minor counties cricket for Northamptonshire from 1900 to 1904, making thirteen appearances in what was a competitive and successful Northamptonshire side. Northamptonshire were granted first-class status for the 1905 season and were admitted to the County Championship. Pinner later made a single first-class appearance for the county against Lancashire in the 1908 County Championship. In this match, he scored 2 not out in Northamptonshire's first-innings, while in their second-innings he was dismissed for 24 by Harry Dean.

He died at the town of his birth on 6 July 1944.
