= Lyme Regis (constituency) =

Former parliamentary constituency in the United Kingdom

- Former borough constituency for the House of Commons

1295–1868
- Seats: Two (1295–1832); one (1832–1868)
- Replaced by: Dorset

Lyme Regis was a parliamentary borough in Dorset, which elected two Members of Parliament (MPs) to the House of Commons of England, the House of Commons of Great Britain, and the House of Commons of the United Kingdom successively from 1295 until 1832, and then one member from 1832 until 1868, when the borough was abolished.

== Members of Parliament ==
=== 1295–1629 ===
- Constituency created (1295)

Parliament	First member	Second member
1386	Walter Tropenell	Robert Membury
1388 (February)	Walter Tropenell	Robert Membury
1388 (September)	Walter Tropenell	John Dorset
1390 (January)	Walter Tropenell	John Dorset
1390 (November)		
1391	Walter Tropenell	John Dorset
1393	Robert Membury	Roger Crogge
1394	Robert Membury	John Stikelane
1395	John Dorset	John Wade
1397 (January)	Thomas Bathe	Hugh Sampford
1397 (September)	John Stikelane	John Crone
1399	Roger Crogge	John Stikelane
1401		
1402	Roger Crogge	Ralph Stikelane
1404 (January)		
1404 (October)		
1406	Roger Crogge	Ralph Stikelane
1407	Peter Richman	John Baker III
1410	Thomas Haseley	
1411		
1413 (February)		
1413 (May)	Thomas Walsingham	Roger Crogge
1414 (April)	John Tynham	Thomas Stikelane
1414 (November)	John Tynham	Roger Crogge
1415		
1416 (March)		
1416 (October)		
1417	Thomas Est	William Taverner
1419	Thomas Stikelane	
1420	Edward Cullyford	John Richman
1421 (May)	Thomas Lond	Nicholas Radford
1421 (December)	Thomas Richman	Richard Parker
1491	John Burgh	
1510–1523	No names known	
1529	John Pyne, died and repl. after 1532 by? John Tudoll	Thomas Burgh
1536	?	
1539	?	
1542	?	
1545	John Fry	William Pole
1547	Sir Francis Fleming	Henry Leke
1553 (March)	?	
1553 (October)	Thomas Goodwin	John Mallock
Parliament of 1554	Thomas Goodwin	John Mallock
Parliament of 1554–1555	Thomas Goodwin	John Mallock
Parliament of 1555	John Strowbridge	Jasper Poyntz
Parliament of 1558	Jasper Poyntz	John Popham (Note: This may be the future Speaker of the House of Commons, John Popham (1531–1607), but his entry in the Dictionary of National Biography judges this identification as "uncertain".)
Parliament of 1559	Nicholas Throckmorton	John Mallock
Parliament of 1563–1567	Francis Walsingham	William Butler (or Boteler?)
Parliament of 1571	John Astley	William Ellesdon
Parliament of 1572–1581	John Astley	George Ellesdon
Parliament of 1584–1585	Edward Drew	John Hassard
Parliament of 1586–1587	Thomas Hughes	John Hassard
Parliament of 1588–1589	Hamden Paulet	Robert Hassard
Parliament of 1593	Zachariah Bethel	Robert Hassard
Parliament of 1597–1598	Richard Tichborne	Christopher Ellesdon
Parliament of 1601	John FitzJames	Nicholas Throckmorton, later Nicholas Carew
Parliament of 1604–1611	Sir George Somers died 1610; By-election Sir Francis Russell	John Hassard too ill to continue sitting 1610 (Note: In 1607, Sir George Somers reported to the Commons that his colleague, Hassard, was too ill from gout to continue serving, and attempted to have him dismissed from his seat. However, the House resolved "That he shall still serve, and that he shall not be removed". But in 1610 Sir John Jeffreys offered a petition on behalf of the borough to allow Hassard to be replaced, and a committee on investigation found that the 69-year-old MP was bed-ridden and incurable, and a new writ was ordered to replace him. (Oldfield, Vol I, p 372).); By-election George Jeffreys
Addled Parliament (1614)	Sir Edward Seymour	George Browne
Parliament of 1621–1622	John Poulett	Robert Hassard
Happy Parliament (1624–1625)	Sir John Drake	William Wynn
Useless Parliament (1625)	John Drake	Thomas Paramour
Parliament of 1625–1626	Sir Walter Erle	Thomas Paramour
Parliament of 1628–1629	Christopher Erle	Thomas Paramour
No Parliament summoned 1629–1640

=== 1640–1832 ===
Year	First member	First party	Second member	Second party
April 1640 (Note: Browne Willis gives three names for Lyme Regis in the Short Parliament, those of Erle, Rose and Prideaux. Other sources do not suggest that Prideaux sat in that Parliament (whereas Erle certainly did), and it is probably his name that is in error.)	Sir Walter Erle	Parliamentarian	Richard Rose	Parliamentarian
November 1640	Edmund Prideaux	Parliamentarian	Richard Rose	Parliamentarian
December 1648	Edmund Prideaux	Parliamentarian	Rose not recorded as sitting after Pride's Purge	
1653	Lyme Regis was unrepresented in the Barebones Parliament			
1654	Sir Edmund Prideaux (Note: Prideaux took his seat in the restored Rump, but died 1659)		Lyme Regis had only one seat in the First and Second Parliaments of the Protectorate	
1656	Sir Edmund Prideaux		Lyme Regis had only one seat in the First and Second Parliaments of the Protectorate	
January 1659	Sir Edmund Prideaux		Henry Henley	
May 1659	Sir Edmund Prideaux		One seat vacant	
April 1660	Walter Yonge		Thomas Moore (sat for Heytesbury)	
June 1660	Walter Yonge		Henry Hyde, later Earl of Clarendon	
1661	Sir John Shaw		Henry Henley	
1679	Sir George Strode		Henry Henley	
1679	Thomas Moore		Henry Henley	
1685	John Pole		Sir Winston Churchill	
1689	John Pole		John Burridge	
1690	Henry Henley		John Burridge	
1695	Henry Henley		Robert Henley	
1701	Joseph Paice		Robert Henley	
1701	Joseph Paice		John Burridge	
1702	Henry Henley		John Burridge	
1705	Thomas Freke		John Burridge	
1710	Henry Henley		John Burridge, junior	
1715	John Henley		John Burridge, junior	
1722	Henry Holt Henley		John Burridge, junior	
1727	Henry Drax		John Burridge, junior	
1728	Henry Drax		Henry Holt Henley (Note: Burridge was re-elected at the general election of 1727 but was subsequently judged to be ineligible since he was Mayor of the borough at the time of the election, and his defeated opponent Henley was declared elected in his place)	
1734	John Scrope		Henry Holt Henley	
1748	John Scrope		Robert Henley	
1753	Thomas Fane, later Earl of Westmorland	Tory	Robert Henley	
1754	Thomas Fane, later Earl of Westmorland	Tory	Francis Fane	Tory
1757	Thomas Fane, later Earl of Westmorland	Tory	Henry Fane	Tory
1762	John Fane, Lord Burghersh, later Earl of Westmorland	Tory	Henry Fane	Tory
1772	Hon. Henry Fane	Tory	Henry Fane	Tory
1777	Hon. Henry Fane	Tory	Francis Fane	Tory
1780 (Note: In 1780 there was a double return: on petition, the election was declared void and a new election held with the same candidates: Fane and Michel were elected in preference to Henry Harford and Lionel Darell.)	Hon. Henry Fane	Tory	David Robert Michel	Tory
1784	Hon. Henry Fane	Tory	Hon. Thomas Fane	Tory
1802	Henry Fane	Tory	Hon. Thomas Fane	Tory
1806	Henry Fane	Tory	Lord Burghersh, later Earl of Westmorland	Tory
1816	Henry Fane	Tory	John Thomas Fane	Tory
1818	Vere Fane	Tory	John Thomas Fane	Tory
1826	Hon. Henry Sutton Fane	Tory	John Thomas Fane	Tory
1832	Representation reduced to one member			

=== 1832–1868 ===
Election	Member	Party
1832	William Pinney	Whig
1842 (Note: Pinney was initially declared re-elected at the general election of 1841, but on petition his election was declared void and Hussey declared elected in his place after scrutiny of the votes)	Thomas Hussey	Conservative
1847	Sir Thomas Abdy	Whig
1852	William Pinney	Whig
1859	William Pinney	Liberal
1865	John Wright Treeby	Conservative
1868	Constituency abolished	

== Election results ==
=== Elections in the 1830s ===
General election 1830: Lyme Regis
Party	Candidate	Votes	%
Tory	John Thomas Fane	Unopposed	
Tory	Henry Sutton Fane	Unopposed	
Registered electors		c. 30	
Tory hold			
Tory hold			

General election 1831: Lyme Regis
Party	Candidate	Votes	%
Tory	John Thomas Fane	Unopposed	
Tory	Henry Sutton Fane	Unopposed	
Registered electors		c. 30	
Tory hold			
Tory hold			

General election 1832: Lyme Regis
Party	Candidate	Votes	%
Whig	William Pinney	79	43.2
Tory	John Fane	60	32.8
Whig	John Melville	44	24.0
Majority		19	10.4
Turnout		183	82.2
Registered electors		222	
Whig gain from Tory			

General election 1835: Lyme Regis
Party	Candidate	Votes	%
Whig	William Pinney	Unopposed	
Registered electors		250	
Whig hold			

General election 1837: Lyme Regis
Party	Candidate	Votes	%
Whig	William Pinney	121	58.2
Conservative	Renn Hampden	87	41.8
Majority		34	16.4
Turnout		208	85.6
Registered electors		243	
Whig hold			

=== Elections in the 1840s ===
General election 1841: Lyme Regis
Party	Candidate	Votes	%	±%
Whig	William Pinney	123	52.8	−5.4
Conservative	Thomas Hussey	110	47.2	+5.4
Majority		13	5.6	−10.8
Turnout		233	84.1	−1.5
Registered electors		277		
Whig hold		Swing	−5.4	

Pinney was unseated on petition on 31 May 1842, and Hussey was declared elected.

General election 1847: Lyme Regis
Party	Candidate	Votes	%	±%
Whig	Thomas Abdy	146	50.5	−2.3
Conservative	Fitzroy Kelly	143	49.5	+2.3
Majority		3	1.0	−4.6
Turnout		289	88.7	+4.6
Registered electors		326		
Whig hold		Swing	−2.3	

=== Elections in the 1850s ===
General election 1852: Lyme Regis
Party	Candidate	Votes	%	±%
Whig	William Pinney	145	53.5	+3.0
Conservative	Phipps Hornby	126	46.5	−3.0
Majority		19	7.0	+6.0
Turnout		271	87.7	−1.0
Registered electors		309		
Whig hold		Swing	+3.0	

General election 1857: Lyme Regis
Party	Candidate	Votes	%	±%
Whig	William Pinney	144	73.1	+19.6
Conservative	Thomas Hesketh	53	26.9	−19.6
Majority		91	46.2	+39.2
Turnout		197	74.9	−12.8
Registered electors		263		
Whig hold		Swing	+19.6	

General election 1859: Lyme Regis
Party	Candidate	Votes	%	±%
Liberal	William Pinney	116	50.2	−22.9
Conservative	John Wright Treeby	115	49.8	+22.9
Majority		1	0.4	−45.8
Turnout		231	87.5	+12.6
Registered electors		264		
Liberal hold		Swing	−22.9	

=== Elections in the 1860s ===
General election 1865: Lyme Regis
Party	Candidate	Votes	%	±%
Conservative	John Wright Treeby	116	52.0	+2.2
Liberal	John Clarke Hawkshaw	107	48.0	−2.2
Majority		9	4.0	N/A
Turnout		223	89.2	+1.7
Registered electors		250		
Conservative gain from Liberal		Swing	+2.2	

== Notes and references ==
=== References ===
- Robert Beatson, A Chronological Register of Both Houses of Parliament (London: Longman, Hurst, Rees and Orme, 1807)
- D. Brunton & D. H. Pennington, Members of the Long Parliament (London: George Allen & Unwin, 1954)
- Cobbett's Parliamentary history of England, from the Norman Conquest in 1066 to the year 1803 (London: Thomas Hansard, 1808)
- F. W. S. Craig, British Parliamentary Election Results 1832–1885 (2nd edition, Aldershot: Parliamentary Research Services, 1989)
- Maija Jansson (ed.), Proceedings in Parliament, 1614 (House of Commons) (Philadelphia: American Philosophical Society, 1988)
- Lewis Namier & John Brooke, The History of Parliament: The House of Commons 1754–1790 (London: HMSO, 1964)* J E Neale, The Elizabethan House of Commons (London: Jonathan Cape, 1949)
- T. H. B. Oldfield, The Representative History of Great Britain and Ireland (London: Baldwin, Cradock & Joy, 1816)
- J. Holladay Philbin, Parliamentary Representation 1832 – England and Wales (New Haven: Yale University Press, 1965)
- Henry Stooks Smith, The Parliaments of England from 1715 to 1847, Volume 1 (London: Simpkin, Marshall & Co, 1844)
- Willis, Browne (1750). Notitia Parliamentaria, Part II: A Series or Lists of the Representatives in the several Parliaments held from the Reformation 1541, to the Restoration 1660 ... London. p. 1.
- Leigh Rayment's Historical List of MPs – Constituencies beginning with "L" (part 4)
