= John Fane, 9th Earl of Westmorland =

English man

The Right Honourable The Earl of Westmorland
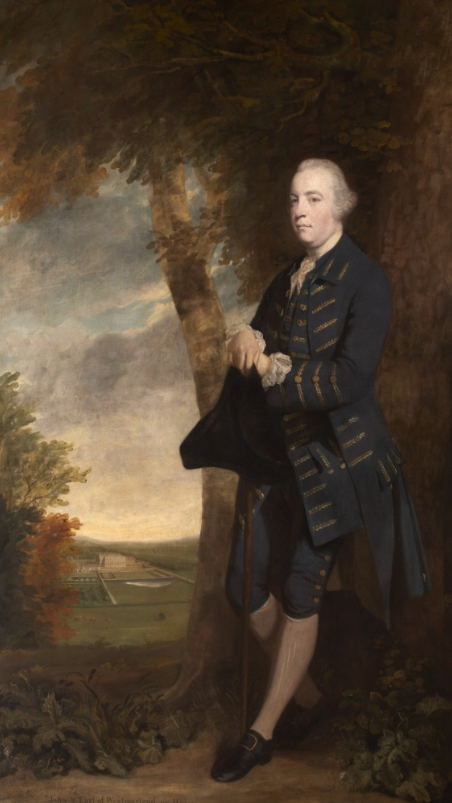
- Sir John Fane, 1764

Member of Parliament for Lyme Regis
- In office 1762–1772 Serving with Henry Fane
- Preceded by: Henry Fane; Thomas Fane
- Succeeded by: Henry Fane; Hon. Henry Fane

Personal details
- Born: John Fane; 5 May 1728
- Died: 25 April 1774 (aged 45)
- Spouse(s): Lady Augusta Bertie; Lady Susan Gordon
- Children: 6
- Parent(s): Thomas Fane, 8th Earl of Westmorland; Elizabeth Swymmer
- Education: Westminster School

John Fane, 9th Earl of Westmorland (5 May 1728 – 25 April 1774), known as Lord Burghersh until 1771, was an English peer and Member of Parliament.

== Early life ==
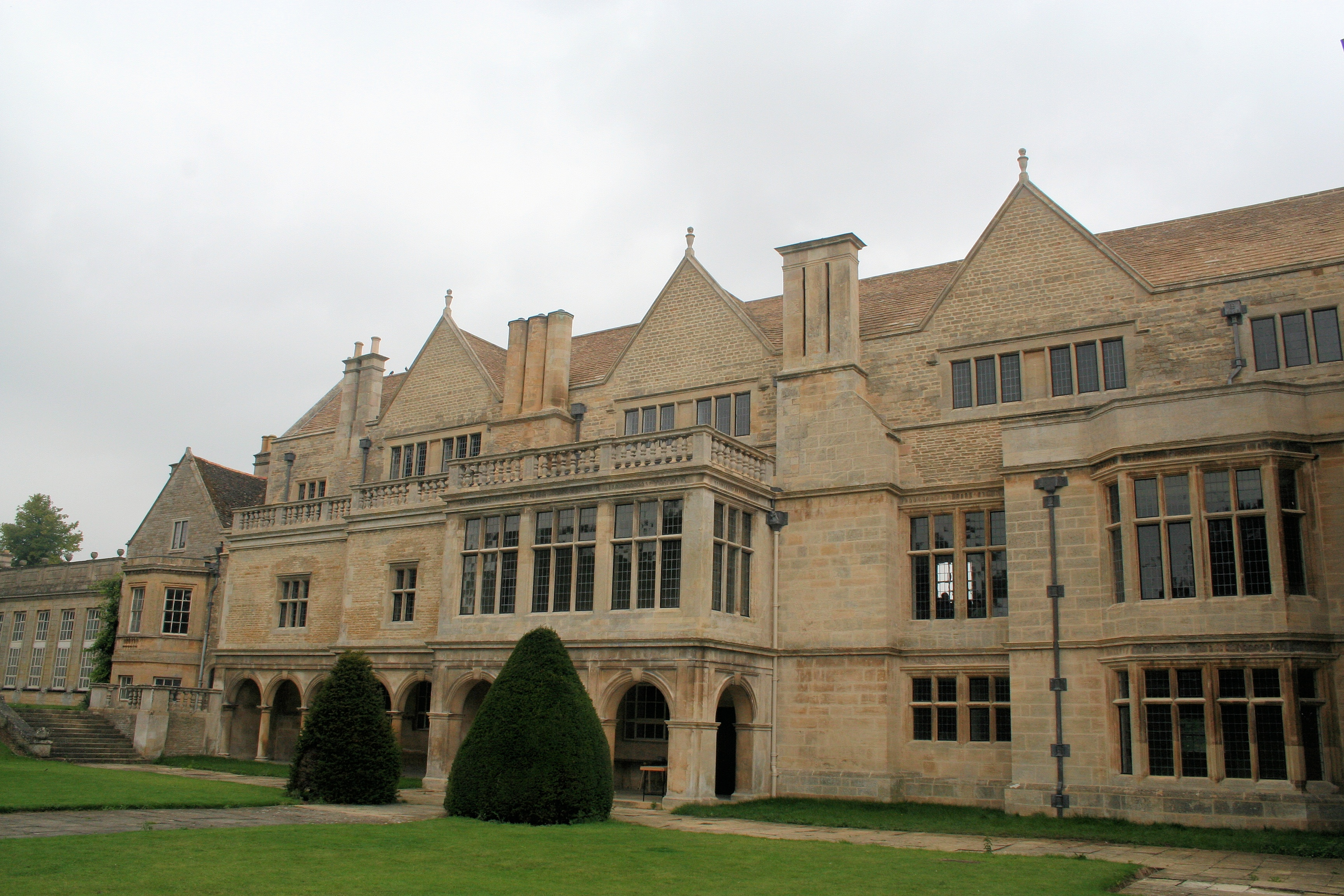
Apethorpe Hall

He was the eldest son of Thomas Fane, 8th Earl of Westmorland of Wormsley Park, Buckinghamshire, and Elizabeth Swymmer (the daughter of Bristol sugar merchant William Swymmer). His younger brother was Henry Fane, MP.

His father was the second son of Henry Fane of Brympton d'Evercy and Anne Scrope (sister and co-heiress of John Scrope). In 1757 his father succeeded his uncle Francis to their father's Brympton estate and, in 1762, inherited the title of Earl of Westmoreland from John Fane, 7th Earl of Westmorland, his father's cousin.

Fane was educated at Westminster School from 1739 to 1745.

== Career ==
He succeeded his father as MP for Lyme Regis from 1762 (passing the seat on to his brother Henry in 1771).

In 1771 he inherited the titles and estates of his father and took his seat in the House of Lords.

== Personal life ==
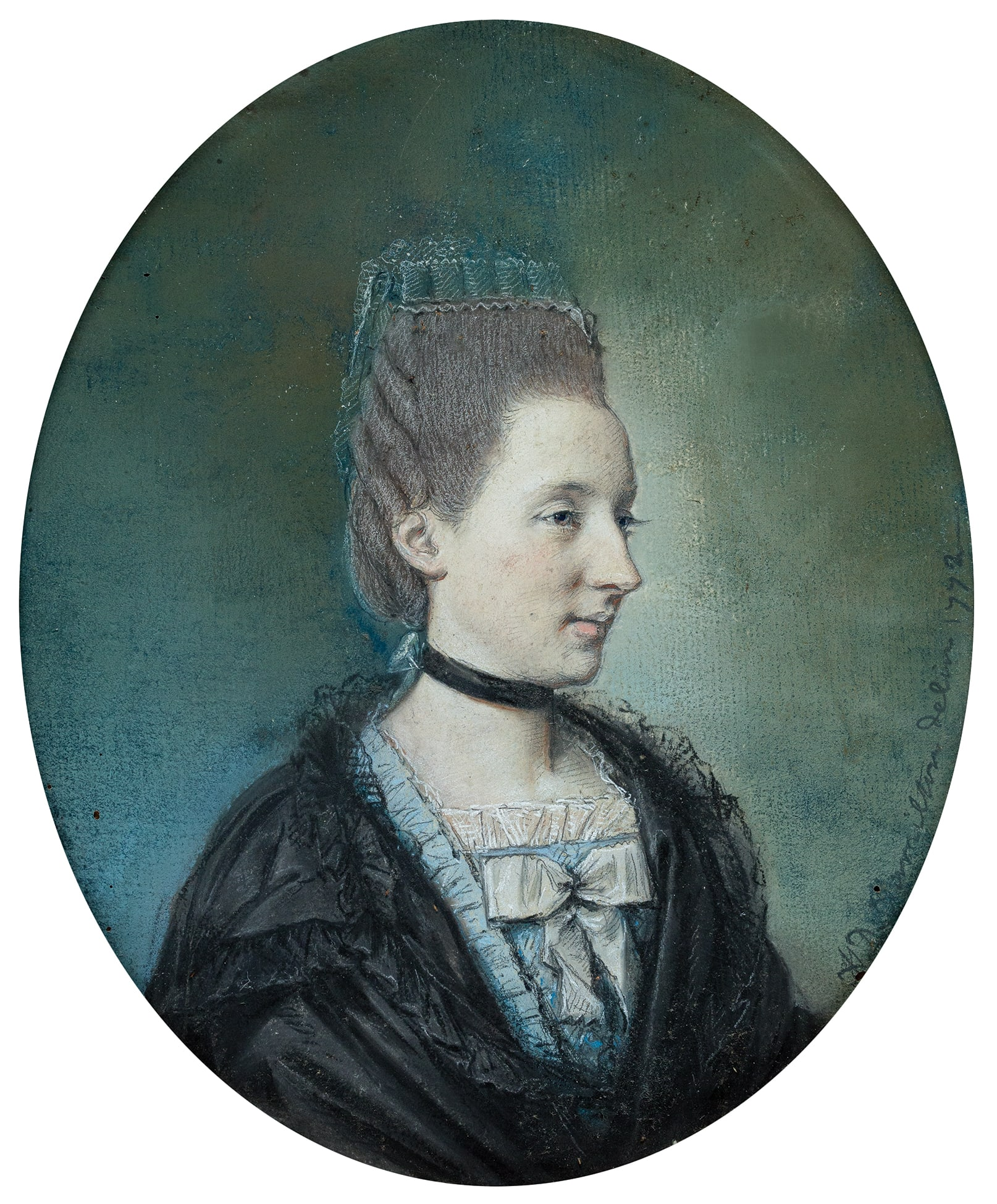
Susan, Countess of Westmorland, aka Lady Susan Gordon, aka Lady Susan Woodford, by Hugh Douglas Hamilton.

His first wife was Augusta Bertie, granddaughter of Robert Bertie, 1st Duke of Ancaster and Kesteven, whom he married on 26 March 1758. They had three children:

- John Fane, 10th Earl of Westmorland (1759–1841), who married Sarah Anne Child, the only daughter and heiress of wealthy banker, Robert Child, against her father's wishes.
- Hon. Thomas Fane (1760–1807), who married Anne Lowe in 1789 and had issue.
- Lady Augusta Fane (1761–1838), who married William Lowther, 1st Earl of Lonsdale.

His second wife was Susan Gordon, daughter of Cosmo George Gordon, 3rd Duke of Gordon and Lady Catherine Gordon. They married on 28 May 1767, and had three children:

- Lady Susan Fane (1768–1793), who married John Drummond, 12th of Lennoch and 5th of Megginch, in 1788, son of Colin Drummond and brother of Gen. Sir Gordon Drummond and Lady Hervey.
- Lady Elizabeth Fane (1770–1844), who married William Lowther's brother Sir John Lowther and had issue.
- Lady Mary Fane (1772–1855), who married George Fludyer, MP, younger son of Sir Samuel Fludyer, 1st Baronet, in 1792 and had issue.

His widow Susan remarried to Col. John Woodford in 1778, at St Marylebone Parish Church, London and their issue included Alexander George Woodford.

=== Reynolds portrait ===
In 1764 Joshua Reynolds painted his full-length portrait entitled Lord Burghersh. Reynolds was paid 100 guineas for the work which depicted the subject wearing blue, embroidered with gold, in a landscape with the family seat, Apethorpe Hall, in the background. In May 1903 the portrait was sold to Martin Colnaghi for 1,250 guineas.

== Arms ==
Coat of arms of John Fane, 9th Earl of Westmorland
Crest Out of a ducal coronet Or, a bull's head Argent pied Sable, armed of the first, charged on the neck with a rose Gules barbed and seeded Proper. Escutcheon Azure three dexter gauntlets backs affrontée Or. Supporters Dexter: a griffin per fesse Argent and Or, gorged with a plain collar and lined Sable; Sinister: a bull Argent pied Sable collared and lined Or, at the end of the line a ring and three staples of the last. Motto "NE VILE FANO" (Disgrace not the altar)

Parliament of Great Britain
Preceded by Henry Fane; Thomas Fane	Member of Parliament for Lyme Regis; 1762–1772; With: Henry Fane	Succeeded by Henry Fane; Hon. Henry Fane
Peerage of England
Preceded by Thomas Fane	Earl of Westmorland; 1771–1774	Succeeded by John Fane
