= Francis Fane (dramatist) =

English writer

Sir Francis Fane, KB, (died 1691) of Fulbeck, in Lincolnshire, was a writer of stage plays and poems and a courtier in the Restoration court of Charles II of England.

== Biography ==
Fane was the eldest son of Sir Francis Fane (c. 1611–1680). Fane the younger was created a Knight of the Bath in 1661 at the coronation of Charles II. Fane and some partners were financiers for a project to drain Eight Hundred Fen, near Boston, Lincolnshire. He ran up substantial debts which he hoped to reduce by the sale of Firbeck Manor in Yorkshire. He petitioned Parliament to pass an act allowing him to do so as it had been settled on his wife and their sons. By his father's will dated 7 June 1679 he inherited the sum of £1800, the majority of his late father's estate.

During the later part of his life Sir Francis resided on his estate at Henbury, Gloucestershire, where he died on 8 April 1691. In his will, dated 14 November 1689, and proved 15 September 1691, he requests his wife (Hannah), whom he appoints sole executrix, "to pay ffourty pounds to the poore of the parish of Olveston, in the county of Gloucester, being in full and more of the ffines at any time leavied by me on the Quakers without a full deduccon of charges in leavying them, the Informers parte not defraying the Charges".

== Works ==
He was the author of:

1. Love in the Dark; or the Man of Business, A Comedy (in five acts, in prose and verse), performed in the Theatre Royal, 4to, London, 1675 Genest, Hist. of the Stage, i. 173-4. In dedicating the play to the Earl of Rochester, Fane observes : "I never return from your lordship's most charming and instructive conversation, but I am inspir'd with a new genius and improv'd in all those sciences I ever coveted the knowledge of: I find my self not only a better poet, a better philosopher, but, much more than these, a better Christian, so that, I hope, I shall be obli'd to your lordship, not only for my reputation in this world, but my future happiness in the next".
2. A Masque, written at Rochester's request for his alteration of Beaumont and Fletcher's 'Valentinian,' and printed in Tate's Poems by several Hands, 8vo, London, 1685 (p. 17).
3. The Sacrifice. A Tragedy (in five acts, and in verse), 4to, London, 1686; 3rd edition, 1687. It was never acted; the author, as he informs the Earl of Dorset in the dedication, "having long since devoted himself to a country life, and wanting patience to attend the leisure of the stage".

In the opinion of Gordon Goodwin who wrote Fane's entry in the original Dictionary of National Biography Fane's plays are not wholly destitute of merit.

== Family ==
Francis Fane was the eldest son of Sir Francis Fane, K.B., F.R.S., of Fulbeck, Lincolnshire, and Aston, Yorkshire, who was the third, but second surviving, son of Francis Fane, 1st Earl of Westmorland and Elisabeth, widow of John, lord Darcy, (eldest daughter of William West of Firbeck, Yorkshire and his wife Catherine Darcy dau of Sir Edward Darcy of Dertford). Sir Francis Fane the elder died in 1681, and was buried in the chancel of Aston Church, together with his wife, who had died before him.

Frances Fane married Hannah, daughter of John Rushworth of the county of Essex. They had several children:

- Henry died as an infant;
- George (recorded as 3 months old in April 1666)
- Francis survived his father. Known as Francis Fane of Fulbeck he married (1693) Dorothy, daughter of Sir Henry Heron of Cressey Hall in county Lincoln and had one son Francis (died 19 October 1758), who married twice; first a daughter of Edward Paine, and then Jane a daughter of Sir Richard Cust. There were no children by either marriage and after his death Jane married James Evelin.
- Henry (2nd son of that name), survived his father, (died 17 December 1726) and was buried at Westbury-on-Trym. He married Anne sister and coheir of John Scrope of Wormsley, they had three sons who survived him: Francis, Thomas Fane, 8th Earl of Westmorland and Henry; and a daughter Mary (died October 1773). She married twice, first to John Henley of Bristol and second to Dr. Samuel Creswick, dean of Wells. Through Thomas Fane, 8th Earl of Westmorland, Fane is an ancestor of the author George Orwell.
- Edward survived his father (died 6 February 1736). He was a prebendary of Lincoln Cathedral. He had a son Edward (died March 1760) who was rector of Fulbeck.
- Six daughters

John Fane, 7th Earl of Westmorland, died without issue, in 1762, when the barony of Le Despencer, being a barony in fee, devolved upon his nephew Sir Francis Dashwood, bart.; but the earldom of Westmorland went to the male heir, Thomas Fane, of Bristol, merchant, son of Henry Fane, (d. 1726,) attorney at law, grandson of Sir Francis Fane, K.B. (the subject of this article) and great grandson of Sir Francis Fane, of Fulbeck, co. Lincoln, K.B. the third son of Francis Fane, 1st Earl of Westmorland.

== See also ==
- Bed trick used in Love in the Dark
