= Abraham Elton =

Abraham Elton is the name of:

- Sir Abraham Elton, 1st Baronet (1654–1728), MP for Bristol
- Sir Abraham Elton, 2nd Baronet (1679–1742), MP for Taunton and Bristol, of the Elton baronets
- Sir Abraham Elton, 3rd Baronet (1703–1761), of the Elton baronets
- Sir Abraham Isaac Elton, 4th Baronet (1717–1790), of the Elton baronets
- Sir Abraham Elton, 5th Baronet (1755–1842), of the Elton baronets

== See also ==
- Charles Abraham Elton (1778–1853), English officer in the British Army and an author
- Elton (disambiguation)
