= Clock Tower, Clevedon =

Victorian-era English structure in Somerset

Clock Tower
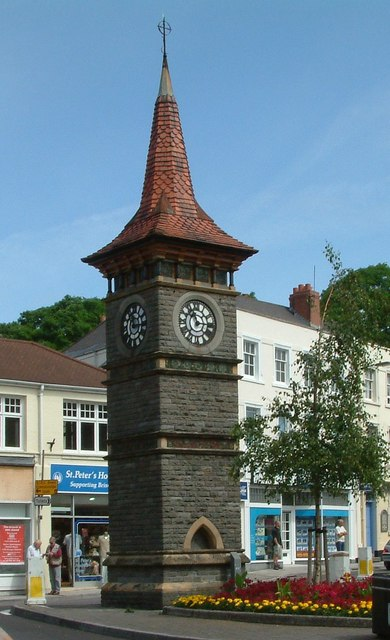

- Location within Somerset
- 51°26′10.7″N 2°51′7.7″W
- Location: Clevedon, North Somerset

History
- Built: 1898

Listed Building – Grade II
- Designated: 22 January 1976
- Reference no.: 1129703

A Victorian Clock Tower is located in the heart of the Triangle shopping centre in Clevedon, Somerset, England. It has been designated as a Grade II listed building.

== History ==
The clock tower was given to the town in the late 19th century by Sir Charles Elton to commemorate the Diamond Jubilee of Queen Victoria, and is decorated with Elton Ware pottery tiles, and an image of Father Time, also made from Elton Ware pottery, provided by his grandson Sir Edmund Elton, both residents of nearby Clevedon Court. At the base of the tower is a drinking fountain, but it has been out of use for many years.

== See also ==
- Clevedon
- Clevedon Court
