= William Taverner =

William Taverner may refer to:

- William Taverner (surveyor) (c. 1680–1768), Newfoundland plantation owner and surveyor
- William Taverner (New Zealand politician) (1879–1958), New Zealand politician
- William J. Taverner, American sex educator/author
- William Taverner (dramatist) (died 1731), English lawyer
- William Taverner (artist) (1703–1772), English judge, son of the dramatist
- William Taverner (fl. 1397–1407), MP for Leominster
- William Taverner (MP for Lyme Regis) in 1417
- William the Taverner, MP for Lichfield
