= Treeby =

Treeby may refer to:

== People ==
- John Wright Treeby (1809–1882), British politician and builder
- Shaun Treeby (born 1989), New Zealand rugby union player

== Places ==
- Treeby, Western Australia, a southern suburb of Perth
