= Henry Fane of Wormsley =

Of Wormsley, British Member of Parliament

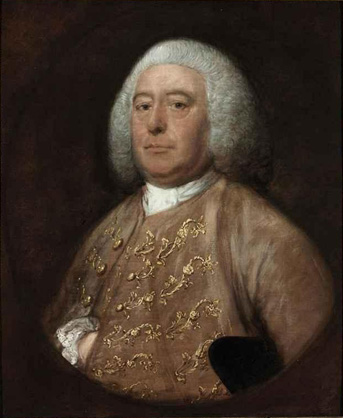
Portrait of Henry Fane by Thomas Gainsborough, c. 1750

Henry Fane (16 October 1703 – 31 May 1777), of Wormsley near Watlington, Oxfordshire, was a British politician who sat in the House of Commons from 1757 to 1777.

== Early life ==
Fane was the third son of Henry Fane (1669–1726) of Brympton and Anne Scrope, sister of John Scrope of Wormsley. His grandfather was Francis Fane, a Restoration dramatist He was appointed one of the chief clerks of the Board of Treasury in 1742 and held the post until July 1764. In 1756 he was appointed a clerk of the Privy Council.

== Political career ==
Fane followed a long line of Fanes as Members of Parliament for Lyme Regis, the family's pocket borough, inherited from John Scrope. At times this provided the Fanes with up to two MPs at the same time. Fane's two brothers Thomas and Francis represented Lyme Regis in Parliament. Following the death of Francis, Fane was returned unopposed as MP for Lyme Regis at a by-election on 13 June 1757. He was returned unopposed again at the 1761 general election. On 16 May 1764 he resigned his post as clerk to the Privy Council, apparently in frustration at receiving no further advancement through the political system. He was returned unopposed again at the general elections in 1768 and 1774. Throughout his career he supported the administration.

== Family and later life ==
Fane died on 31 May 1777.

On 17 July 1735, Henry Fane married Charlotte Rowe, only daughter of Nicholas Rowe, Esq. the Poet Laureate. She died in 1739, at twenty-three, and was buried in Westminster Abbey. They had a daughter, Charlotte, who married Sir William St. Quintin of Harpham in Yorkshire, 15 May 1758. She died on 17 April 1762, and is buried at Harpham.

Fane married for the second time on 20 May 1742. He married Anne Wynne, daughter of Dr. John Wynne, late bishop of Bath and Wells, with whom he had one daughter, Mary, who on 27 November 1765, married Sir Thomas Stapleton, of Grey's-court in Oxfordshire, Bart, (see Stapleton baronets), and was mother of Lord le Despencer (see Baron le Despencer).

Fane married his third wife, Charlotte Luther, in September 1748. She was the daughter of Richard Luther, of Miles (Myles's) near Ongar in Essex, Esq. who died 18 April 1758, and sister of John Luther. She was buried at Lewknor. They had a daughter who died an infant and four sons:

- Henry Fane, died 4 January 1759, aged eight years, and is buried at Lewknor;
- John Fane (1751–1824), a member of parliament for Oxfordshire;
- Francis Fane (5 December 1752 – 10 November 1813), a member of parliament for Dorchester;
- Richard Fane, died 28 March 1759, buried at Lewknor.

== Additional Reading ==
- Bindoff, Stanley T.; et al. (1982). The House of Commons: 1509 – 1558; 3, Members N – Z. Vol. 4. Boydell & Brewer, 1982. ISBN 0-436-30420-1.
- Collins, Arthur; Brydges, Egerton (1812). Collins's Peerage of England; Genealogical, Biographical, and Historical. Vol. 3. F. C. and J. Rivington, Otridge and son.

Attribution

Parliament of Great Britain
Preceded by Thomas Fane; Francis Fane	Member of Parliament for Lyme Regis; 1757–1777; With: Thomas Fane 1757–1762; Lord Burghersh 1762–1772; Hon. Henry Fane 1772–1777	Succeeded by Hon. Henry Fane; Francis Fane
