= John Pyne (disambiguation) =

John Pyne (died 1679) was English Member of Parliament for Poole in 1625–1629 and 1640–1653.

John Pyne may also refer to:

- John Pyne (Lyme Regis MP), English Member of Parliament for Lyme Regis in 1529
- John Pyne, Irish 'victim' of the alleged witch Florence Newton in 1660
- John Pyne, dirt bike racer in the Australian Super Sedan Championship

== See also ==
- John Pine, English designer, engraver, and cartographer
