= Peter Richman =

Peter Richman may refer to:

- Peter Mark Richman (1927–2021), American actor
- Peter Richman (MP) for Lyme Regis
