= Thomas Abdy =

Thomas Abdy may refer to:

- Sir Thomas Abdy, 1st Baronet, of Felix Hall (1612–1686), English lawyer and landowner
- Sir Thomas Abdy, 1st Baronet, of Albyns (1810–1877), British Member of Parliament

== See also ==
- Abdy baronets
