= Stephens (car manufacturer) =

Early British automobile manufacturer

Stephens (automobile)
- Type: Private
- Industry: Automotive
- Founded: c. 1898
- Founder: Richard Stephens
- Defunct: c. 1902
- Headquarters: Clevedon, Somerset, England
- Area served: United Kingdom
- Key people: Sir Edmund Elton (backer), Robin Loder (restorer)
- Products: Motor cars

Stephens was an early British automobile manufacturer based in Clevedon, Somerset, active between about 1898 and 1902. The company was founded by engineer and cycle maker Richard Stephens (1856–1938), who aimed to build one of the first entirely British-made motorcars at a time when most early vehicles relied on imported components.

Though only a handful of Stephens cars were built—believed to be no more than twelve —the marque holds a notable place in the early history of British motoring. Two examples survive today, AE 174 and AE 341, both preserved by the Loder family, who continue to operate and exhibit the vehicles at veteran car events such as the London to Brighton Veteran Car Run.

== History ==
=== Origins and background ===
Richard Stephens was born in Wales in 1856. After a period of engineering work in the United States, he settled in Clevedon in 1888, where he worked as a steamroller driver for the local council before opening The Clevedon Cycle Depot and Refreshment Rooms on Old Street. The business expanded into cycle manufacture and mechanical engineering.

In the mid-1890s, Stephens, supported by William Shopland the carpenter, and by local inventor and baronet Sir Edmund Elton, established the Stephens Engineering and Motor Car Works at The Triangle, Clevedon, with the aim of producing a motorcar using only British-made components.

=== The first motorcars ===
Stephens completed his first working prototype around 1898. It used a two-cylinder horizontal engine of his own design, belt drive to a countershaft, and chain drive to the rear wheels. The car featured a tubular steel chassis inspired by bicycle construction and incorporated independent front suspension—an advanced feature for its time.

Over the next few years, Stephens built several further vehicles, including two-seater dog-cart models, a six-seater taxi supplied to Bath, and nine-seater omnibus versions used on passenger routes between Clevedon, Weston-super-Mare and Cheddar Gorge.

=== Decline and later life ===
By the early 1900s, larger manufacturers had entered the market, making it difficult for small-scale operations to survive. Only around twelve Stephens cars are thought to have been built before production ceased around 1902. Stephens continued to operate his garage and engineering business until his death in 1938.

== Surviving cars ==
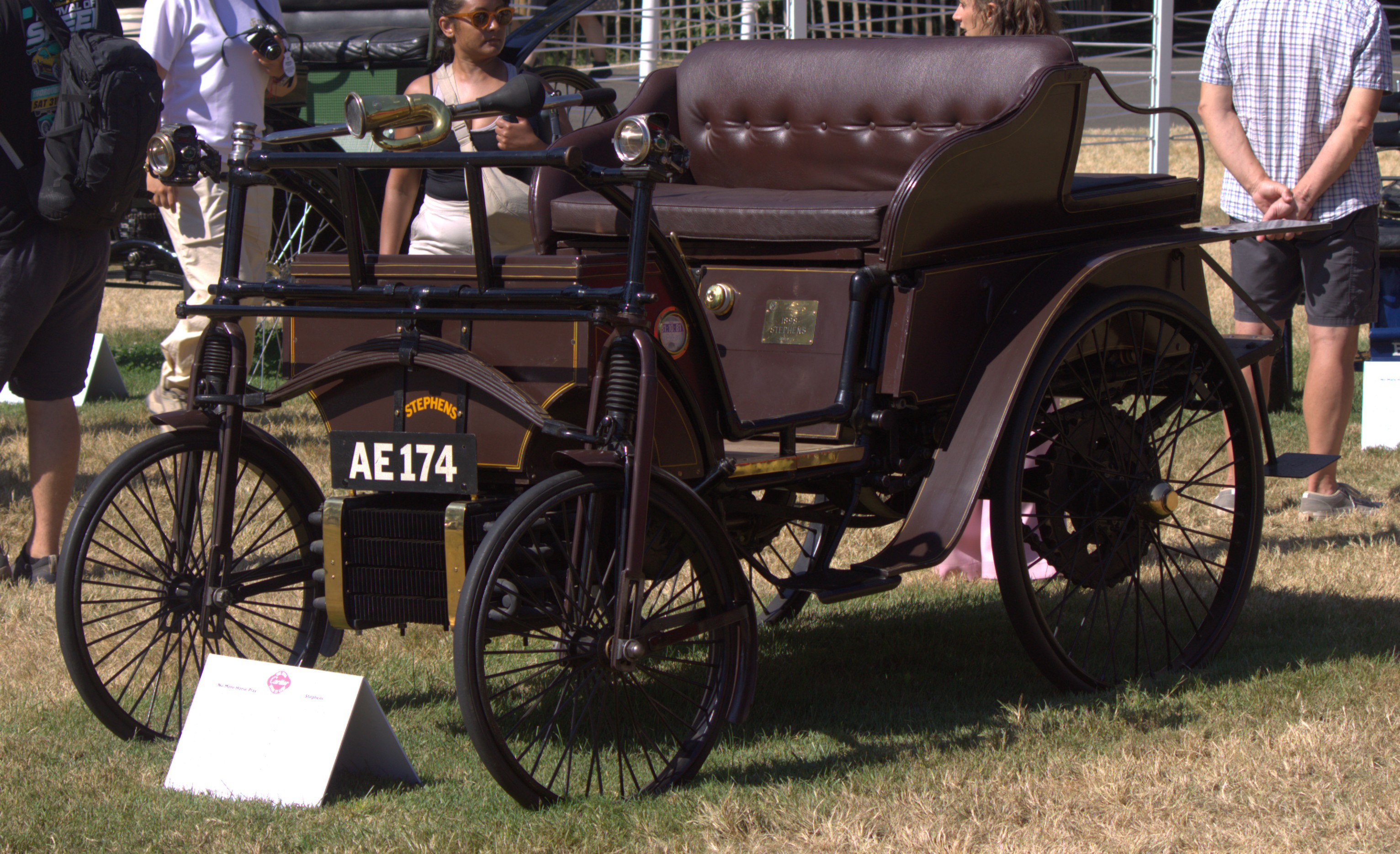
AE 174 at Goodwood Festival of Speed 2026

Only two original Stephens cars are known to survive:

- AE 174 – an 8 hp twin-cylinder model built in 1898, featuring a two-speed belt transmission.
- AE 341 – a 10 hp twin-cylinder later model incorporating refinements to the belt and drive system with a three-speed belt transmission.

Both cars are owned by the Loder family, who maintain and exhibit them regularly. AE 174 and AE 341 continue to participate in the London to Brighton Veteran Car Run, and are recognised as among the earliest surviving British-built cars still in operation.

In 2024, members of the Clevedon community assisted in recreating period parts for AE 174 using original Victorian methods and materials, as part of an effort to preserve the town's motoring heritage.

== Technical features ==
Stephens vehicles incorporated several advanced engineering ideas for the late 1890s:

- Twin-cylinder horizontal engine, designed and built by Stephens.
- Belt drive to a countershaft, with chain drive to the rear wheels.
- Independent front suspension.
- Tubular steel chassis derived from bicycle construction.
- Multiple belt pulleys used to vary drive ratios (“gears”).

Body styles included two-seater dog-carts, phaetons, and small omnibuses. Vehicles were steered by tiller and equipped with solid rubber tyres and acetylene lighting.

== Replica and modern recognition ==
In 1954 AE174 was used as a motor car in the film The Magic Box as the car of protagonist William Friese-Greene.

In 2024, a full-scale replica of Stephens's 1898 prototype was unveiled at the Clevedon Civic Centre to celebrate the town's motoring heritage. The project was organised by local historians and supported by the Clevedon Civic Society and enthusiasts’ groups. The replica has since been displayed at regional events and exhibitions.

Regional media, including the BBC, have recognised Stephens's pioneering work and his effort to create a truly British car decades before the rise of major domestic manufacturers such as Austin and Morris.

== Historical significance ==
Stephens's enterprise predated the industrialisation of the British motor industry and demonstrated remarkable ingenuity. His attempt to build a car using only domestic materials and craftsmanship symbolised early British engineering independence.

The survival of AE 174 and AE 341 provides valuable insight into the veteran era of motoring, when innovation often came from local workshops rather than large manufacturers. Campaigns are underway to install a permanent memorial to Richard Stephens and his motor works in Clevedon.

== See also ==
- List of car manufacturers of the United Kingdom
- Veteran car
- Automotive industry in the United Kingdom
- London to Brighton Veteran Car Run
