= Thomas Lond =

English politician

Thomas Lond was an English politician. He sat as MP for Melcombe Regis in May 1413 and Lyme Regis in May 1421.
