= Robert Hassard (MP) =

English politician (1552–1627)

- Baptised: 1 April 1552
- Died: 1627
- Citizenship: Kingdom of England
- Occupation: Politician

Robert Hassard (1552–1627) was an English politician who served as a Member of Parliament for Lyme Regis from 1588 to 1589 and 1593, and Mayor of Lyme in 1600–1601.

== Early life ==
He was born in March 1552 to John Hassard, who was elected the Mayor of Lyme in 1557 but died that same year when Robert was only 5 years old. He was baptised on 1 April 1552 in Lyme.

== Career ==
=== 16th century ===
He owned property in Bere and Bridport, and invested in the privateer Foresight of Lyme as a part owner.

He married Elizabeth Clarke on 5 December 1577 in St Martin's Church, Exeter. The family settled near Colyton, Devon, where his children were born.

In 1588 he was elected by the Mayor, burgesses, and freemen of Lyme as an MP.

in 1590, he was selected as Warden of the Cobb Ale, responsible for organising the festival that would raise funds for the maintenance of Lyme's sea wall and flood defences, named the Cobb. This was crucial to the maintenance of the town's harbour and trade, and had received funding from the Exchequer since the reign of Edward III. In 1590, Robert spent 23 weeks in London on behalf of Lyme, riding to the court, to Windsor and several times to Greenwich to secure a renewal of government support for the maintenance of the cobb and fee-farm rent.

In 1593, Robert was chosen as Member of Parliament for Lyme again by the mayor, burgesses, and freemen of the town, and is listed as one of its capital burgesses.

On 3 May 1595, Robert had a dispute with the town council over land he had enclosed that he believed he owned, but the council contended was common land and blocked a public right of way by St Andrew's Chapel, but was later elected as one of two Constables of Lyme in 1596.

In 1598, Robert was chosen as one of four surveyors of the properties in Lyme, and tasked with surveying houses in West Street, and later as Receiver of the Cobb Duties. However, Robert fell into a second property dispute in May 1585. He was accused of illegally expanding his land by taking part of a lane behind John Galley's house on a lane leading down to the Cobb. He was accused of removing boundary stones, which marked legal property divisions. A formal land survey was conducted in front of multiple witnesses to confirm the exact measurements of the disputed area. The town council ordered him to restore the land by Midsummer 1598 or face a fine of 20 shillings.

In 1599, Robert faced two other land disputes in Lyme. Firstly, he altered the course of water to a well that ran through church land, which resulted in less fresh water being available to the people of Lyme. He was ordered to pay a 12 pence fine for this. Secondly, he had taken over a path belonging to John Cawley and locked the gate, therefore blocking access to the Cobb, for which he was fined 4 pence.

=== 17th century ===
In August 1600, Robert was elected as Mayor of Lyme. Within the first 6 weeks of his election Robert enforced strict local bylaws on the brewing and selling of beer, gambling, drunkenness, who could visit alehouses, eating meat on holy days, religious observance, and lodging. He also selected himself as an overseer of the town mill, for which he received pay. He was re-elected as Mayor again in August 1601.

In 1612, Robert showed continued support for the puritanical preacher, John Gear(e), who had his license to preach revoked. Gear(e) had been Vicar at Lyme since 1608. Gear(e) brought a legal case against the Mayor and Wardens of the Cobb Ale for profanity and abuse of religious standards, which was supported by Robert. This ended the Cobb Ale. In response, disgruntled town councillors charged Robert with misdemeanours committed during his time as Mayor. This came before the Star Chamber and was dismissed from his position as a town burgher, and as a magistrate. He was given the opportunity to restore himself to these positions by judicial hearing in the Star Chamber "at the intercession of some honourable person", but chose not to do so.

== Death ==
Robert died in 1627, leaving 13 shillings to the poor of Lyme Regis, 20 shillings to John Gear(e), and legacies were left to his children and his wife.
