= William Hayman (merchant) =

Bristol merchant and mayor 1684

William Hayman was a merchant, slave trader and Mayor of Bristol in the 17th century.

Hayman was Mayor of Bristol in 1684. In 1684, Hayman was involved in an abortive attempt to supply slaves illegally to a Somerset squire, William Helyar, with a plantation in Nevis. Slaves were transported but for an unknown reason were sold to other owners. Hayman undertook this trade with his nephews Anthony and William Swymmer, and another merchant John Napper.

Solomon, "a black belonging to William Hayman", was baptised in St Augustine's Church in Bristol in 1631; it is not clear if this the same Hayman.

After the Monmouth rebellion, Hayman, who was Mayor of Bristol at the time, was fined £1000 by Chief Justice Jeffreys, for kidnapping of slaves for plantations.

Hayman's daughter Mary married Thomas Edwards, MP. Mary inherited much of her uncle Edward Colston's fortune when he died in 1721.

It is not known when Hayman died. He attended a meeting of the Society of Merchant Venturers, of which he was a member, in 1699.
