= John Thomas Fane =

English politician

Member of Parliament for Lyme Regis
- In office 29 March 1816 – 7 June 1832 Serving with Henry Sutton Fane
- Succeeded by: William Pinney one seat after Reform Act 1832

Personal details
- Born: 28 April 1790
- Died: 23 March 1833 (aged 42)
- Parent: Thomas Fane

John Thomas Fane (28 April 1790 – 23 March 1833) was an English politician in the 19th century.
