= Thomas Hussey (Lyme Regis MP) =

British Conservative Party politician

Thomas Hussey DL, JP (1814–1894) was a British Conservative Party politician.

Hussey was the eldest son of John Hussey. He was educated at Brasenose College, Oxford, graduating with a Bachelor of Arts in 1837. In the same year he was called to the bar by Lincoln's Inn and in 1840 obtained his Master of Arts.

When his predecessor William Pinney was unseated in 1842, Hussey entered the British House of Commons. He was returned for Lyme Regis until 1847.

Hussey served in the 1st Somerset Militia, being commissioned as a captain on 4 April 1846. The regiment was embodied for fulltime service from 2 May 1854 to 12 June 1856 during the Crimean War, carrying out home defence duties at Plymouth, Taunton and Aldershot. Hussey was promoted to major on 1 February 1862. He commanded the regiment as lieutenant-colonel from 11 November 1874 and received the honorary rank of colonel on 19 December 1874. He resigned on 25 January 1879.

He was a deputy lieutenant for Dorsetshire and represented the county also as justice of the peace.

In 1853, Hussey married Julia, daughter of John Hickson. He died at Lympstone in 1894.

== Notes ==
Parliament of the United Kingdom
Preceded by William Pinney	Member of Parliament for Lyme Regis; 1842 – 1847	Succeeded by Thomas Neville Abdy
