= John Baker (fl. 1407) =

English politician

John Baker III (fl. 1407) was an English politician.

Baker married Joan by 1395. He was apparently 'of Whitford’, six miles from Lyme Regis. He had several run-ins with the law, in 1408 for 'illegal disseisin of land at Colyford, Devon' and in July 1405, for 'fornication with Alice Benet'. He confessed and was fined, but in 1408, was being investigated for this same offence.

Baker was a cloth merchant. He was MP for Lyme Regis in 1407.
