= Thomas Bathe (MP) =

English politician

Thomas Bathe (died c. 1428) was an English politician. He sat as MP for Lyme Regis in January 1397.

He also served as escheator of Somerset and Dorset from 16 November 1397 till 26 November 1399; and commissioner of inquiry in Somerset and Wiltshire in February 1403.

By 1381, he was married to Joan, the daughter and heiress of Nicholas Acton. By 1409, he was married to his second wife, Margaret.
