= Court Hill =

Geological site near Clevedon, Somerset, England

- Site of Special Scientific Interest
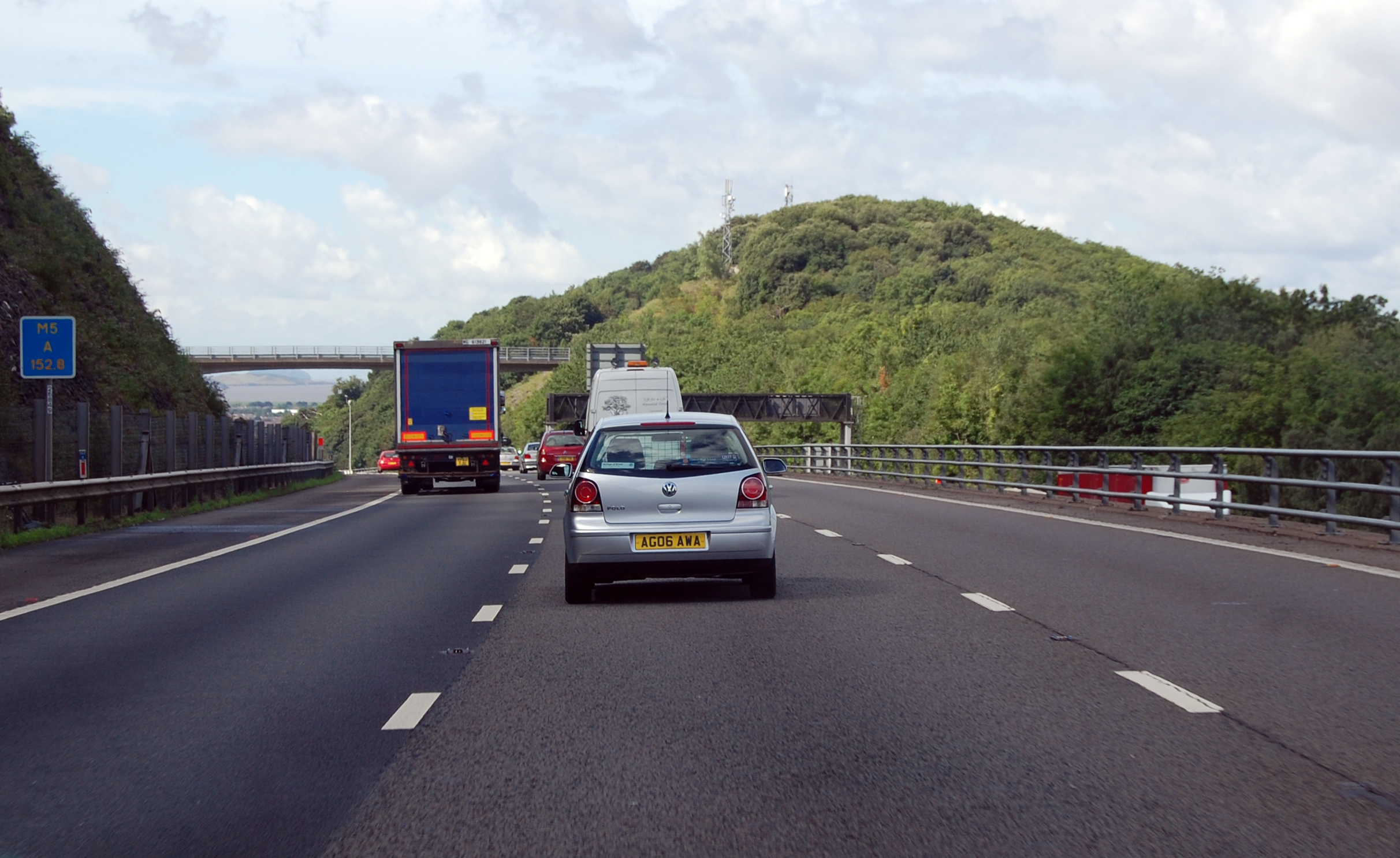

- Location within Somerset
- Location of Court Hill.
- Area of search: Avon
- Grid reference: ST436722
- Coordinates: 51.44597°N 2.81294°W
- Interest: Geological
- Area: 10.45 hectares (0.1045 km^{2}; 0.0403 sq mi)
- Notification date: 1997

Court Hill (grid reference ST436722) is a 10.45 hectare geological Site of Special Scientific Interest near the town of Clevedon, North Somerset, England, notified in 1997.

== Pleistocene ==
Court Hill is a Geological Conservation Review Site because it is the only example in southern England of an ice-marginal col-gully cut by glacial meltwater and infilled by a variety of glacial sediments. The Pleistocene deposits include gravels, boulder-beds, sands, and till, overlain by cover sands with erratics of flint and Greensand chert.

It has also yielded a number of Jurassic and Cretaceous foraminifera (micro fossils).

== Manor house ==
Clevedon Court is a manor house on the side of Court Hill, dating from the early 14th century. It is owned by the National Trust and has been designated by English Heritage as a Grade I listed building.
