= 1724 Taunton by-election =

UK parliamentary by-election

| ← 1722 | 18 January 1724 | 1727 → |
| Candidate | George Deane | Abraham Elton | William Molyneux |
| Party | Tory | Whig |
| Candidate | Griffith Pugh |
MP before election
John Trenchard
Whig
Subsequent MP
Abraham Elton
Whig

The 1724 Taunton by-election to the Parliament of Great Britain was held on 18 January 1724 in Taunton, Somerset, following the death of the incumbent, John Trenchard. The by-election was contested by Abraham Elton, George Deane, William Molyneux and Griffith Pugh. Elton, a Whig who had been a late entrant to the election won, and despite a petition from Deane, was returned as the Member of Parliament for Taunton.

== Background ==
During the 1722 British general election, two Whigs were elected for the Parliamentary constituency of Taunton, John Trenchard and James Smith. Their Tory opponent petitioned Parliament against their return, but the petition was rejected. Trenchard died on 16 December 1723, leaving a vacancy. George Deane, who had been one of the losing Tories in 1722, stood once again, and was joined by William Molyneux, a secretary to the Prince of Wales and Griffith Pugh, of Covent Garden. Then, two days before the election, Abraham Elton revealed himself as a candidate for the Whiggish interest.

== Result ==
The election was held on 18 January 1724. Two separate returns were made; the mayor declared Elton to have been elected, but the "constables and bailiffs, and several of the inhabitants" suggested that Deane had won. The High Sheriff of Somerset, Walter Robinson, accepted the decision of the mayor, who acted as the returning officer for elections, and Elton was duly elected as the second member for Taunton.

== Aftermath ==
Deane lodged a petition against the result, which was heard by a committee, and dismissed by a vote of 151 to 104, therefore upholding the election of Elton to parliament. Elton only served Taunton until the general election, in 1727, when he contested the seat vacated by his father in Bristol.
