= William Pinney =

British politician and military officer

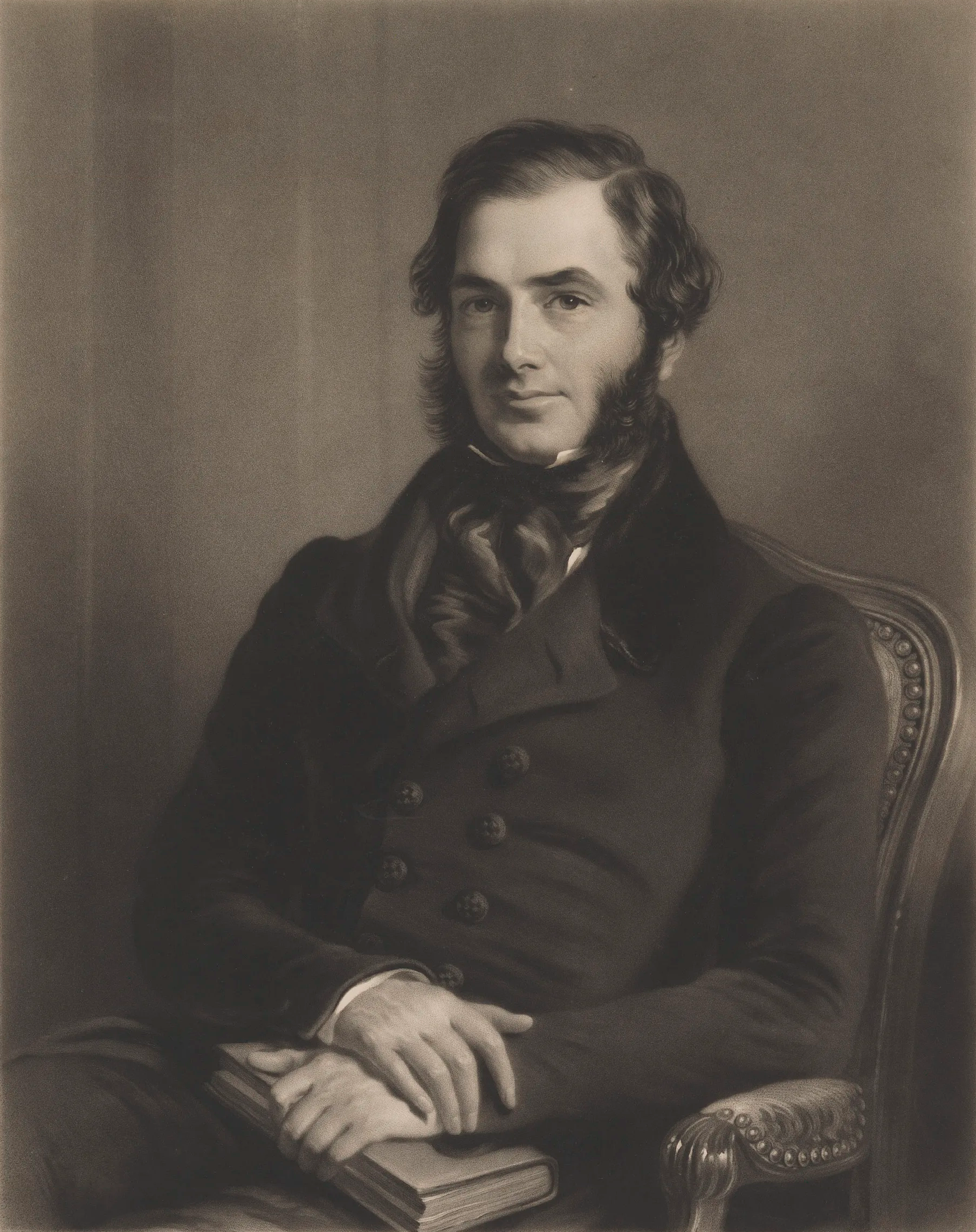
- Mezzotint by Thomas Lewis Atkinson after Andrew Morton, c. 1845

Member of Parliament for Lyme Regis
- In office 8 July 1852 – 12 July 1865
- Preceded by: Thomas Abdy
- Succeeded by: John Wright Treeby
- In office 14 December 1832 – 31 May 1842
- Preceded by: Henry Sutton Fane; John Thomas Fane
- Succeeded by: Thomas Hussey

Member of Parliament for East Somerset
- In office 10 April 1847 – 22 July 1852 Serving with William Miles
- Preceded by: William Gore-Langton; William Miles
- Succeeded by: William Miles; William Knatchbull

Personal details
- Born: 4 July 1806 Somerton-Erleigh, Somerton, Somerset
- Died: 30 May 1898 (aged 91)
- Resting place: Somerton Cemetery, Somerton, Somerset
- Party: Liberal
- Other political affiliations: Whig
- Parent(s): John Frederick Pinney; Frances Dickinson

Colonel William Pinney (4 July 1806 – 30 May 1898) was a British Liberal and Whig politician, and military officer.

Born in Somerton, Somerset, Pinney was the son of John Frederick Pinney and Frances née Dickinson, the daughter of William Dickinson. He died unmarried.

Pinney was first elected Whig MP for Lyme Regis at the 1832 general election and held the seat until 1842 when he was unseated due to bribery, treating, and other corrupt practices by himself, and his agents, friends and parties.

He returned to Parliament for East Somerset at a 1847 by-election—caused by the death of William Gore-Langton—and held the seat until 1852, when he stood down to successfully contest Lyme Regis again. He then held this seat until 1865, when he stood down.

In 1868, Pinney stood for East Somerset once more, but ended bottom of the poll out of four candidates.

Pinney was also Colonel of the 2nd Somerset Militia from 18 January 1850.

Parliament of the United Kingdom
Preceded by Henry Sutton Fane; John Thomas Fane	Member of Parliament for Lyme Regis; 1832–1842	Succeeded by Thomas Hussey
Preceded by William Gore-Langton; William Miles	Member of Parliament for East Somerset; 1847–1852; With: William Miles	Succeeded by William Miles; William Knatchbull
Preceded by Thomas Abdy	Member of Parliament for Lyme Regis; 1852–1857	Succeeded by John Wright Treeby
