= Thomas Dorset =

Member of the Parliament of England

Thomas Dorset was an English politician who was MP for Lyme Regis eleven times between 1360 and 1384. History of Parliament Online theorises that he was the father of John Dorset.
