= Edmund Elton =

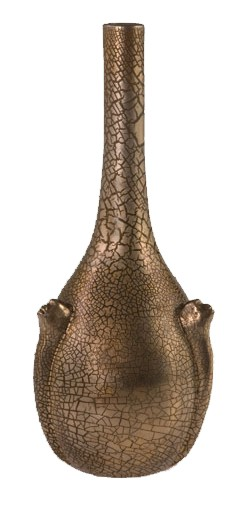
Crackle-glazed vase by Edmund Elton

Sir Edmund Harry Elton, 8th Baronet (3 May 1846 – 17 July 1920) was an English inventor and studio potter noted for his production of Elton Ware at the Clevedon Elton Sunflower Pottery.

He was the son of the painter Edmund William Elton and Lucy Maria, daughter of the Rev. John Morgan Rice. Lucy Maria died 16 May 1846, shortly after Edmund Harry's birth. Edmund William then married Clementine Sandryk of Florence on 2 December 1859, producing two daughters:

1. Mina Antoinetta Beatrice (died 21 June 1876) married (17 April 1873) Robert Frederick Boyle (13 June 1841 – 15 May 1883)
2. Alma Marion

Edmund Harry Elton was educated at Bradfield College and Jesus College, Cambridge.

In 1868 Edmund Harry married his cousin Mary Agnes, second daughter of Sir Arthur Hallam Elton and produced two sons and three daughters – Ambrose born in 1869, Kathleen Agnes Rhoda, Winifred Lucy, Bernard Arthur, and Angela Mary.

He was the nephew of Sir Arthur Elton, 7th Baronet, and inherited both Clevedon Court and the title in 1883 (see Elton baronets). He was Major and Honorary Lieutenant-Colonel of the 1st Gloucestershire Royal Garrison Artillery (Volunteers) until he reigned his commission in May 1902.

He donated the town Clock Tower, completed in 1898, to Clevedon, North Somerset, in celebration of Queen Victoria's Jubilee. He was appointed High Sheriff of Somerset in 1895.

The ceramic artist William Fishley Holland joined the pottery after the death of Sir Edmund Elton in 1920, and started his own pottery near Clevedon Court on the closing of the Elton pottery in 1922.

Elton's daughter Kathleen married Guy Molesworth Kindersley and was the mother of David Kindersley, the stone letter-cutter and typeface designer.

== See also ==
- Castle Hedingham Pottery

== Bibliography ==
- Elton Ware Book – Malcolm Haslam (published by Richard Dennis 1989) DN-5256

Baronetage of Great Britain
Preceded by Arthur Elton	Baronet (of Bristol); 1883–1920	Succeeded by Ambrose Elton
