= Peter Richman (MP) =

Member of the Parliament of England

Peter Richman (fl. 1407) was an English Member of Parliament for Lyme Regis in 1407.
