= Sir Abraham Elton, 2nd Baronet =

British merchant, slave trader and politician (1679–1742)

Sir Abraham Elton Bt
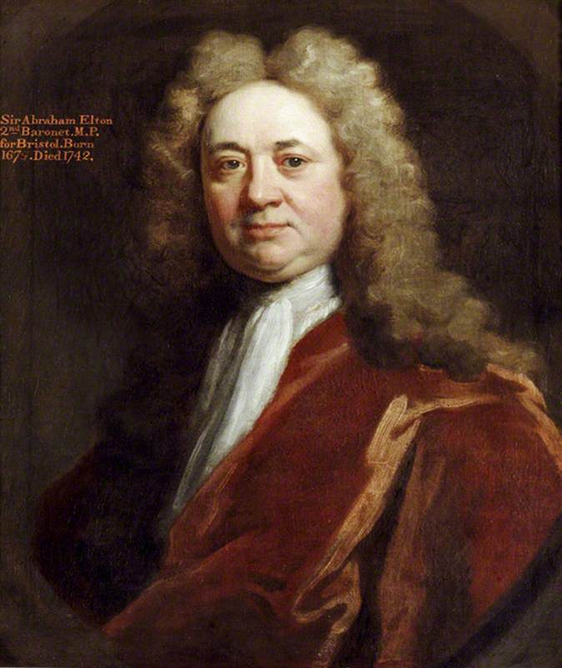
- Portrait attributed to Jonathan Richardson

Member of Parliament for Taunton
- In office 1724–1727 Serving with James Smith
- Preceded by: John Trenchard; James Smith
- Succeeded by: Francis Fane; George Speke

Member of Parliament for Bristol
- In office 1727–1742 Serving with John Scrope, Thomas Coster, Edward Southwell
- Preceded by: Sir Abraham Elton, Bt. Joseph Earle
- Succeeded by: Edward Southwell; Robert Hoblyn

Personal details
- Born: 1679
- Died: 20 October 1742 (aged 62–63)
- Party: Whigs
- Spouse: Abigail Bayly (m. 1702; died 1724)

Sir Abraham Elton, 2nd Baronet (1679 – 20 October 1742) was a British merchant, slave trader and Whig politician who represented Taunton in the House of Commons of Great Britain from 1724 to 1727. He also represented Bristol in the House of Commons from 1727 until his death in 1742. Elton served as the High Sheriff of Bristol from 1710 to 1711 and mayor of Bristol from 1719 to 1720.

== Early life ==
Elton's exact date of birth is not known, but he was baptised on 30 June 1679. He was the eldest son of Abraham Elton (later created the first of the Elton baronets), and his wife Mary Jefferies.

== Career ==
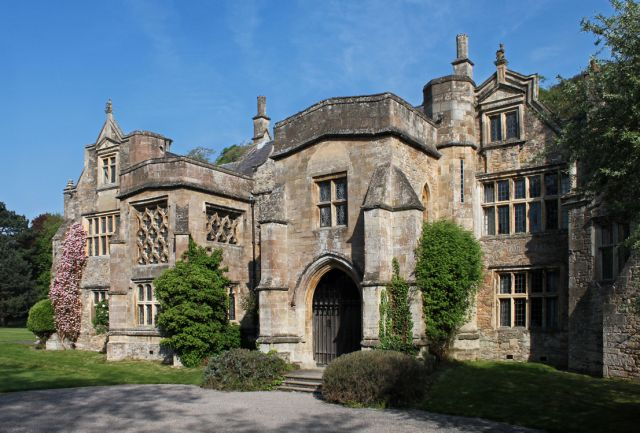
Clevedon Court

Elton was a merchant and industrialist, and like his father before him, he served as the High Sheriff of Bristol in 1710–11. He invested in several slave ships along his brothers, Isaac and Jacob. He was the Master of the Society of Merchant Venturers in 1719 and Mayor of Bristol from 1719 to 1720, but in 1720 he was made bankrupt during the "South Sea Bubble". As soon as he completed his term as Mayor, he left Bristol and travelled to France, and did not return until his father paid off his debts.

Upon his father's death on 9 February 1728, Elton became Sir Abraham Elton, 2nd Baronet, and inherited Clevedon Court.

=== Member of Parliament ===
Elton returned to England by 1724, and stood in the Taunton by-election of 1724 for the Whigs, as an unexpected late entrant. He was duly elected to serve as a Member of Parliament for Taunton, though one of the other candidates, George Deane, filed a petition against his election. The petition was rejected by a vote of 151 to 104. He only served Taunton until the general election in 1727, when his father vacated his seat in Bristol. At the resulting election, Elton paid his Tory opponent £1,000 to withdraw from the election, allowing him to be returned unopposed. In Parliament, he became a member of the gaols committee. In February 1730 he spoke against the Royal African Company's petition to be spared the cost of maintaining their forts. He often petitioned government on mercantile issues, amongst them: in 1730 for the removal of duty on soaps and candles, five separate times for the removal of duty on Irish yarn, and twice against the introduction of duties on slaves. He was said to have made a "bantering speech" against the proposed Excise Bill of 1733.

Elton topped the poll in a contest at the 1734 general election. He continued raising petitions on mercantile issues, and voted with the Opposition in all recorded divisions. He was returned unopposed at the 1741 general election.

== Personal life ==
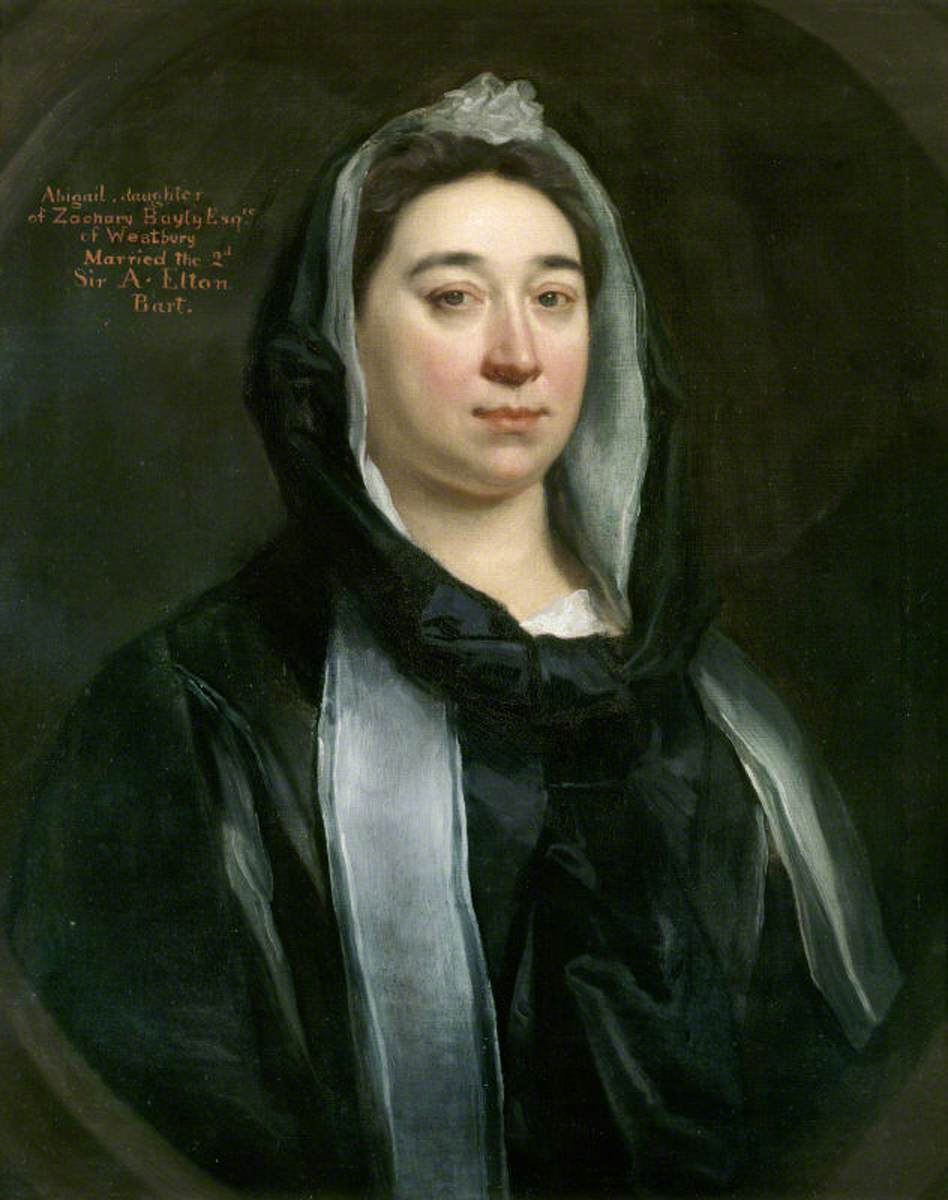
Portrait of his wife, Lady Elton, by Jonathan Richardson, c. 1702

On 14 May 1702, Elton married Abigail Bayly (1677–1724), the daughter of Zachary Bayly of Charlcot House, near Westbury, Wiltshire and Northwood Park, near Glastonbury, Somerset.

- Jacob Elton (d. 1745), a captain in the Royal Navy who was killed in action in a sea battle with the French; he married Caroline Yate, daughter of Charles Yate.
- Mary Elton (1706–1755), who married James Heywood, of Maristow (near Roborough in Devon) and Jamaica.
- Sir Abraham Elton, 3rd Baronet (1703–1761), who served as Sheriff of Bristol and died unmarried.
- Elizabeth Elton (1716–1790), who married Capt. George Forster.
- Sir Abraham Isaac Elton, 4th Baronet (1717–1790), who married Elizabeth Read, daughter of James Read, in 1747.

Elton died on 20 October 1742, leaving three sons and three daughters. The baronetage passed to his eldest son, who became Sir Abraham Elton, 3rd Baronet but died without issue. The baronetcy then passed to his brother Sir (Abraham) Isaac Elton, 4th Baronet. Another of Elton's sons, Jacob, became a Royal Navy captain but was killed in a sea battle. Elton's daughters Mary and Elizabeth both married.

=== Descendants ===
Through his daughter Mary, he was a grandfather of James Modyford Heywood, MP for Fowey.

Through his youngest son, Abraham Isaac Elton, he was a grandfather of the Rev. Sir Abraham Elton, 5th Baronet (1755–1842).

Parliament of Great Britain
Preceded by John Trenchard; James Smith	Member of Parliament for Taunton; 1724–1727; With: James Smith	Succeeded by Francis Fane; George Speke
Preceded by Sir Abraham Elton, Bt. Joseph Earle	Member of Parliament for Bristol; 1727–1742; With: John Scrope (1727–1734); Thomas Coster (1734–1739); Edward Southwell (1739–1742)	Succeeded by Edward Southwell; Robert Hoblyn
Baronetage of Great Britain
Preceded by Abraham Elton	Baronet (of Bristol); 1728–1742	Succeeded by Abraham Elton
