= Henry Fane of Brympton =

Henry Fane (1669–1726) of Brympton, Somerset was a great-grandson of Francis Fane, 1st Earl of Westmorland and father of Thomas Fane, 8th Earl of Westmorland.

Henry was born in 1669 the fourth son of Francis Fane a noted Restoration dramatist, and Hannah, daughter of John Rushworth of the county of Essex. He was the second son to be named Henry and the second eldest to survive his father.

Henry made a fortune through Bristol privateering and trade in West Africa and West Indies. He was Clark to the Society of Merchant Venturers of the City of Bristol from 1701 to 1726 when his son Thomas took over from him.

Henry married Anne, sister and coheir of John Scrope of Wormsley, and granddaughter of the regicide Colonel Adrian Scrope who was hanged, drawn and quartered after the restoration as one of the regicides of Charles I. They had three sons reaching adulthood:

- Francis. He became a commissioner for Trade and the Plantations, and a British Member of Parliament. He died in 1757;
- Thomas. He inherited the title of Earl of Westmorland, on the death of John Fane, 7th Earl of Westmorland in 1762.
- Henry. He became one of the chief clerks of the board of treasury, one of the chief clerks to the Privy Council, and a Member of Parliament.

Henry and Anne had one daughter, Mary (died October 1773). She married twice, first to John Henley of Bristol and second to Dr. Samuel Creswick, dean of Wells.

Henry died on 19 December 1726 and was buried at Westbury-on-Trym in Gloucestershire.
