= William Swymmer =

English merchant and slave trader

William Swymmer was an English merchant and slave trader. In 1667, he became a member of the Society of Merchant Venturers. He was an alderman in Bristol, and then Sheriff in 1679. Swymmer may have inherited a share in a sugar plantation in Barbados from his father. His brother Anthony Swymmer and his wife Elizabeth Swymmer were also involved in the slave trade. Records survive of the1684 correspondence from William Swymmer and William Hayman, to William Helyar, the Somerset owner of a Jamaica plantation, explaining why they were unable to provide the ten slaves they had contracted to supply. The deal was illegal, as the Royal African Company had a monopoly on the British slave trade at this point.

In 1681, Swymmer built two warehouses in Bristol, probably for the storage of sugar, and in 1692 Swymmer loaned the Society of Merchant Venturers £600 for building a new quay and cranes in Bristol docks.

In 1686 Swymmer writes to William Helyar to explain a delay in a separate consignment of slaves that had been agreed between Elizabeth Swymmer and Helyar's son. Historian Madge Dresser reports this as the only case she has found of a Bristol woman involved in her husband's slave-factoring or slave trading business.

Swymmer's daughter Elizabeth married Thomas Fane, 8th Earl of Westmorland.
