= John Pyne (Lyme Regis MP) =

Member of the Parliament of England

John Pyne (by 1500 – 1531/32), of London, was a Member of Parliament in 1529 for Lyme Regis.
