= Roger Crogge =

Member of the Parliament of England

Roger Crogge was an English politician who was MP for Lyme Regis in 1393, 1399, 1402, 1406, May 1413, and November 1414. He was also reeve of Colyford from 1422 to 1423 and mayor of Lyme Regis 1437.
