= Elton baronets =

Title in the Baronetage of Great Britain

- Escutcheon of the Elton baronets of Bristol
- Creation date: 1717
- Status: extant
- Seat: Clevedon Court
- Motto: Artibus et armis, By arts and arms

The Elton Baronetcy, of Bristol, is a title in the Baronetage of Great Britain. It was created on 31 October 1717 for Abraham Elton, Mayor of and Member of Parliament for Bristol from 1722 to 1727. The second Baronet was also Mayor of Bristol and represented Taunton and Bristol (1727–1742) in the House of Commons.

The seventh Baronet sat as Liberal Member of Parliament for Bath from 1807 to 1809. The eighth Baronet was High Sheriff of Somerset in 1895. The tenth Baronet was a pioneer of the British documentary film industry.

== Elton baronets, of Bristol (1717) ==
- Sir Abraham Elton, 1st Baronet (1654–1728)
- Sir Abraham Elton, 2nd Baronet (1679–1742)ref name="HoP2"/>
- Sir Abraham Elton, 3rd Baronet (1703–1761)
- Sir Abraham Isaac Elton, 4th Baronet (1717–1790)
- Sir Abraham Elton, 5th Baronet (1755–1842)
- Sir Charles Abraham Elton, 6th Baronet (1778–1853)
- Sir Arthur Hallam Elton, 7th Baronet (1818–1883)
  - Edmond William Elton (1822–1859)
- Sir Edmund Harry Elton, 8th Baronet (1846–1920)
- Sir Ambrose Elton, 9th Baronet (1869–1951)
- Sir Arthur Hallam Rice Elton, 10th Baronet (1906–1973)
- Sir Charles Abraham Grierson Elton, 11th Baronet (born 1953)

The heir apparent to the baronetcy is Abraham William Elton (born 1995).

== Extended family ==
Frederick Coulthurst Elton, great-grandson of Isaac Elton, great-grandson of Jacob Elton, third son of the first Baronet, was a colonel in the British Army. His son Frederick Algernon George Young Elton (1867–1921), was a brigadier-general in the Royal Artillery.

Mary Elton (née Stewart of Castle Stewart) the second wife of the fifth baronet, The Reverend Sir Abraham Elton, helped develop the resort town of Clevedon and endowed local schools: the Mary Elton Primary School in Holland Road, Clevedon, is named after her.

== See also ==
- Sir Edward Marwood-Elton, 1st Baronet

== Notes ==
Baronetage of Great Britain
Preceded by Milner baronets	Elton baronets of Bristol; 31 October 1717	Succeeded by Bridges baronets
