= Sir Thomas Abdy, 1st Baronet, of Albyns =

British politician (1810–1877)

Sir Thomas Neville Abdy, 1st Baronet, DL JP (21 December 1810 – 20 July 1877) was a British baronet and politician.

== Background ==
He was the only son of Captain Anthony Abdy, a maternal greatgrandson of Sir William Abdy, 4th Baronet, and his wife Grace Rich, daughter of Sir Thomas Rich, 5th Baronet. Abdy was educated at Winchester Cathedral in Hampshire and at St John's College, Cambridge, where he graduated with a Bachelor of Arts in 1833. He was then admitted to the Middle Temple.

== Career ==
In 1841, Abdy contested Maldon unsuccessfully. He was elected as a Member of Parliament (MP) for Lyme Regis in 1847 and represented the constituency until 1852. On 22 December 1849, Abdy was created a baronet, of Albyns, in the County of Essex, and in 1875, he was appointed High Sheriff of Essex. Abdy was Deputy Lieutenant and Justice of Peace.

== Family ==
On 19 October 1841, he married Harriet Alston, second daughter of Rowland Alston. They had six children, two daughters and four sons:

- Mary Harriet (1842–1853)
- William Neville (1844–1910)
- Grace Emma (1846–1923)
- Anthony (b. 1849)
- Robert Jack (1850–1893)
- Henry Beadon (1853-1921)

Abdy died aged 66 and was succeeded in the baronetcy successively by his sons William, Anthony and Henry. His daughter Grace Abdy married Lord Albert, son of the 2nd Duke of Sutherland.

Parliament of the United Kingdom
Preceded by Thomas Hussey	Member of Parliament (MP) for Lyme Regis; 1847 – 1852	Succeeded by William Pinney
Baronetage of the United Kingdom
New creation	Baronet (of Albyns); 1849 – 1877	Succeeded by William Abdy
