= Clevedon Court =

Manor House in Somerset, England

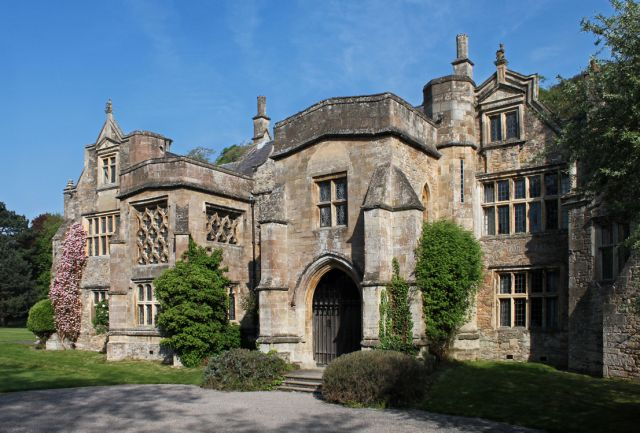

- Location within Somerset

General information
- Location: Clevedon, England
- Coordinates: 51.4402°N 2.8321°W
- Completed: 14th century
- Client: Sir John de Clevedon

Clevedon Court is a manor house on Court Hill in Clevedon, North Somerset, England, dating from the early 14th century. It is owned by the National Trust and is designated as a Grade I listed building.

The house was built and added to over many years. The great hall and chapel block are the earliest surviving parts of the structure with the west wing being added around 1570, when the windows and decoration of the rest of the building were changed. Further construction and adaptation was undertaken in the 18th century when it was owned by the Elton baronets. The house was acquired by the nation and was given to the National Trust in part-payment for death duties in 1960. The Elton family is still resident in the house, which is now open to the public.

In addition to the main house, the grounds include a selection of walls and outbuildings, some of which date back to the 13th century. The gardens are listed (Grade II*) on the National Register of Historic Parks and Gardens.

== History ==
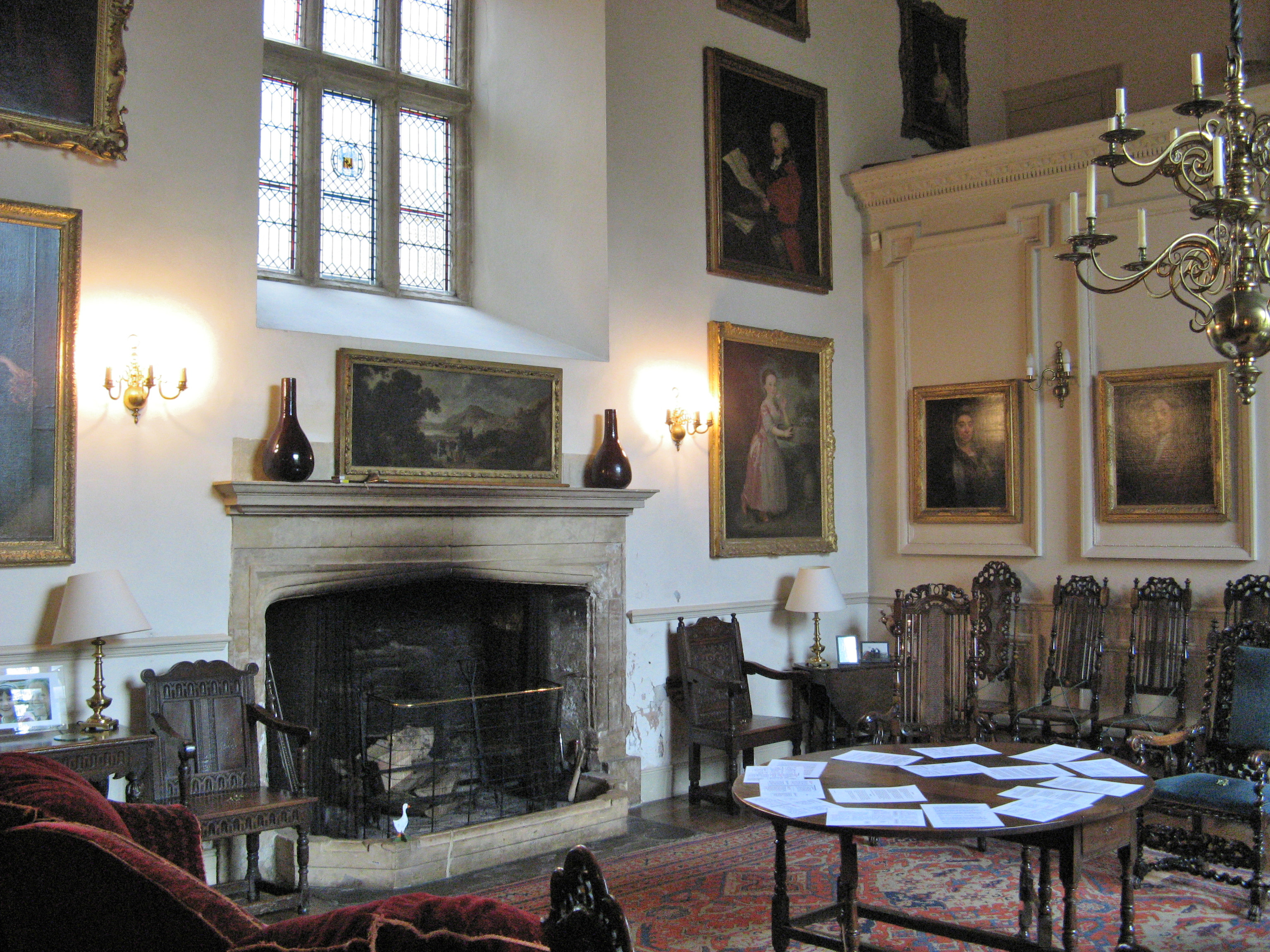
Great Hall

Much of the present house was built in the early 14th century by Sir John de Clevedon (d. 1336). There is speculation that it may lie on the site of a Roman building, based on excavations to the south of the house in 1961/62. The house incorporates remnants of a 13th-century building which lie at an angle to the rest of the house. It was situated nearly two miles inland from the parish church of St Andrew, which stands on the coast.

After the Norman Conquest of 1066, the manor of Clevedon was granted by the King to Matthew de Mortagne, who in turn granted it to his sub-tenant, Hildebert. It is thought that Sir John was a descendant of either Matthew or Hildebert. Perhaps because of the distance to the parish church, the manor house included a chapel dedicated, in the 1320s, to Saint Peter. The house has undergone considerable change since it was built, almost every century seeing structural alterations, but it still retains many features of a mediaeval manor house.

Sir John de Clevedon's, daughter, Katherine, founded England's first free school. The de Clevedon family line ended in 1376, and the manor eventually passed, by marriage, to the Northamptonshire family of Wake, who were Lords of the Manor until 1630. John Wake made major additions to the house in the late 16th century, including a new west wing. The manor was sold by Sir John Wake to Sir John Digby in 1630. Digby's estates were confiscated during the English Civil War, but were recovered after the Restoration by his heir. In 1709 the house was bought by Abraham Elton, a merchant from Bristol.

The Eltons were a prominent Bristol family, and Abraham 1st was Sheriff of Bristol in 1702, a member of the Society of Merchant Venturers becoming Master in 1708, Mayor of Bristol in 1710, and High Sheriff of Gloucestershire in 1716. He became a member of parliament for the five years preceding his death in 1728. He was created a baronet in 1717 as the first of the Elton baronets. The family wealth originally came from copper and brass (including mining in the Mendip Hills) and other commerce, and property. His descendants, not only at Clevedon, also profited from the slave trade.

Sir Abraham Elton was succeeded by four further Sir Abraham Eltons. Sir Abraham Elton, 2nd Baronet, and his son Sir Abraham Elton, 3rd Baronet, were also Sheriff and Mayor of Bristol in their time, and the second Baronet was also MP for Taunton 1722–1727, succeeding to his father's seat of Bristol in 1727 until his own death in 1742, despite being nearly ruined in the South Seas Bubble crisis. The third Baronet died bankrupt, and the estate (which had been entailed to protect it from his creditors) passed in 1761 to his brother, Sir Abraham Isaac Elton, 4th Baronet. He made substantial changes to the house and grounds in the then fashionable Gothic revival style, and was succeeded in 1790 by his son, Sir Abraham Elton, 5th Baronet. He was ordained as a young man, and was a curate in West Bromwich before inheriting the title. He was a supporter of Hannah More, and a fervent opponent of Methodism, at one time inducing the vicar of Blagdon to dismiss his curate, causing a national scandal. His second wife, Mary, made further alterations to the house in the early 19th century, and also made many improvements to the town, including a school. One of the town's modern primary schools is named after her.

The line of Abrahams came to an end in 1842 when Sir Charles Abraham Elton, 6th Baronet, succeeded his father. Sir Charles was a writer, and contributed to several periodicals including The Gentleman's Magazine. Sir Charles' sister Julia was married to the historian Henry Hallam, and his nephew Arthur Hallam is buried in the Elton family vault at St Andrew's church. Arthur Hallam is the subject of Alfred Tennyson's poem In Memoriam A.H.H.. Tennyson visited Clevedon Court in 1850, the year in which the poem was published, and also in which he was created Poet Laureate. William Makepeace Thackeray was a visitor to the court during Sir Charles's time and it was the inspiration for the house Castlewood which featured in his novel The History of Henry Esmond although, contrary to common belief, it is improbable that he wrote any of it at Clevedon Court. Samuel Taylor Coleridge lived in Clevedon briefly during this period and may have visited the Court.

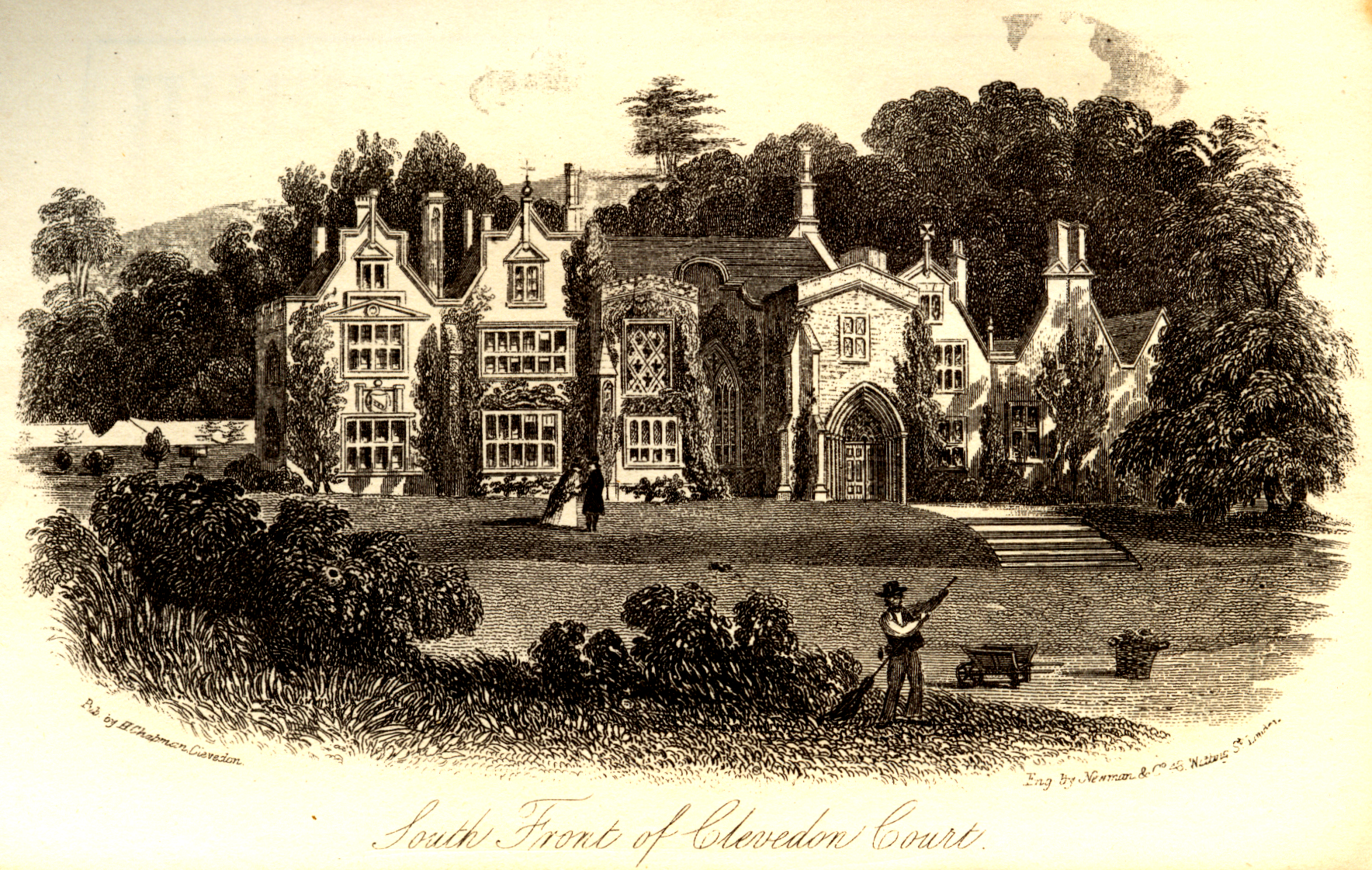
Clevedon Court, engraving from circa 1870

Sir Arthur Elton, 7th Baronet, inherited the house and title in 1853 and, like his father, was a writer. He resigned as MP for Bath in 1859 and spent the rest of his life improving the town, setting up a lending library and allotments, and building and funding the cottage hospital (still in existence). All Saints' Church, near the Court, was built in 1860 on the orders of Sir Arthur, and he also made additions to the fabric of the Court itself. The West Wing of the house was largely destroyed by a fire in 1882. It was rebuilt, with C. E. Davis as the architect. During these building works, the chapel was rediscovered, the East window having been filled and altar broken off (perhaps during the English Protestant Reformation), and the room having been known until then as the "Lady's Bower".

Sir Edmund Elton, 8th Baronet, nephew and son-in-law of Sir Arthur, inherited the estate and title in 1883. He was an enthusiastic voluntary fireman, and inventor of one of the first forked bicycle brakes, as well as a device to prevent ladies' skirts from becoming entangled in bicycle wheels. He was also a well-known potter, setting up his "Sunflower Pottery" in the Court grounds with the help of a local boy called George Masters. "Elton ware" became popular, especially in America where it was marketed by Tiffany & Co. Elton and Masters' work typically has a variety of rich colours, bas-relief decoration of flowers in a style similar to Art Nouveau, and in the later works metallic glazes are often used.

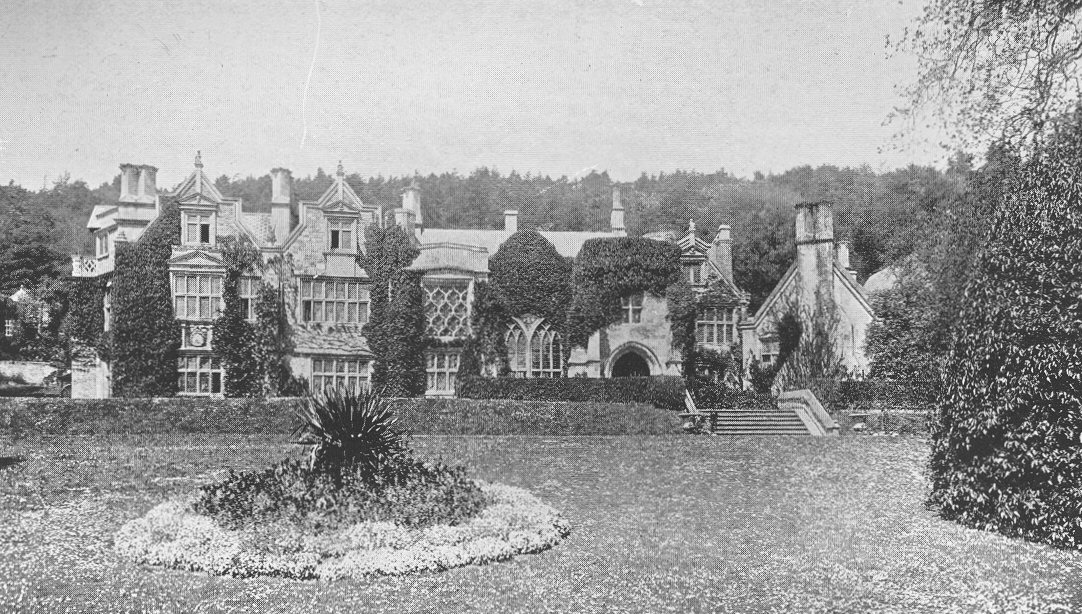
Clevedon Court in the early 20th century

Sir Edmund's son Sir Ambrose succeeded him in 1920. His son Sir Arthur was one of the pioneers of documentary film making in the years prior to, during and after the Second World War, working with John Grierson. He inherited the title on his father's death in 1951. The house was acquired by the Nation, and was given to the National Trust, in part-payment of death duties, in 1960. The West Wing was immediately demolished, being considered to have no architectural or historical significance, to reduce running costs and to return the house to its supposed mediaeval ground plan. Sir Arthur died in 1973 and was succeeded by his son Sir Charles. The Elton family is still resident in the house, which is now open to the public.

== Architecture ==
The site faces south, with its back to Court Hill, and the road may have passed east–west within 15 metres (49 ft) of the front door. The great hall, screens passage, porches and chapel blocks have all survived from the early 14th century and the square headed chapel windows contain reticulated tracery of the decorated period. These buildings were probably complete by 1322 although the parapets of the porches and chapel may have been remodelled at a later date. The 14th-century building embodied older structures including a small four-storey tower that dates, perhaps, to the mid to late 13th century, and the building that became the 14th-century kitchen (now the museum) was probably the earlier hall.

Alterations during the late mediaeval period were limited to the addition of a two-storey latrine tower at the rear of the house and some rearrangement of the rooms around it. In about 1570 a substantial west wing was added, adjoining and parallel to the solar wing. Apparently typical of its period, it would have transformed the living arrangements of the Wake family who built it. Presumably at the same time, the front of the solar block and east wing were "Elizabethanised" with new windows, and the gable end of the kitchen block at the eastern end was decorated with finials.

There is little evidence of the building work that must have been done in the early 1700s following a period of near-disuse and it may have been restricted to repairs. Substantial alterations in the 1760s and 1770s included the replacement and repitching of the great hall roof, the new gothic south window of the great hall complete with the ogee parapet above it and the provision of a ceiling within the hall. At the same time, the west wing façade was remodelled in "Chinese Gothic" style.

Sir Arthur Elton (7th Bt) began updating the house before 1850 (and the lodge at the gate dates from 1851) but it was in 1860s that he made major changes. The west wing was extended and remodelled, this time with an Elizabethan style façade. Less obvious alterations to the east end (where the servants lived and worked) probably also date to this period. The fire of 1882 destroyed much of the western end of the house. In the rebuilding that followed, an even larger west end was constructed but Sir Arthur took pains to ensure that its Elizabethan south front was conserved and retained. Postcards of Clevedon reveal that the last change to the great hall window was made in about 1912, when it was given a square head again, in Elizabethan style.

In the late 1950s, when the National Trust agreed to take on the house, the Victorian west wing (but not its Elizabethan south front) were demolished as were a plethora of minor 18th- and 19th-century buildings at the rear. The new west front was given a stonework façade and incorporated the Elizabethan south front.

== Outbuildings ==
In the grounds, the only certain survivor from the medieval period is the small crenellated drum tower. Its original purpose is unknown. It adjoins a substantial wall that may also have origins in the 13th century. The other garden walls have unknown dates of origin but mostly pre-date around 1730, when the stables were built. All of the other buildings, including the lodge at the South entrance (1851) are Georgian or Victorian. The medieval appearance of the eastern barn resulting from incorporation of stone from the former medieval barn that stood in front of the house.

An early picture of the court shows a building known as Wake's Tower on Court Hill. It is included in Saxton's map of 1570 but was demolished before 1738. Towers such as this were popular Elizabethan features and were lookouts or summer houses. A summerhouse was built on the site but this too was in ruins by the early 19th century.

== Interior ==
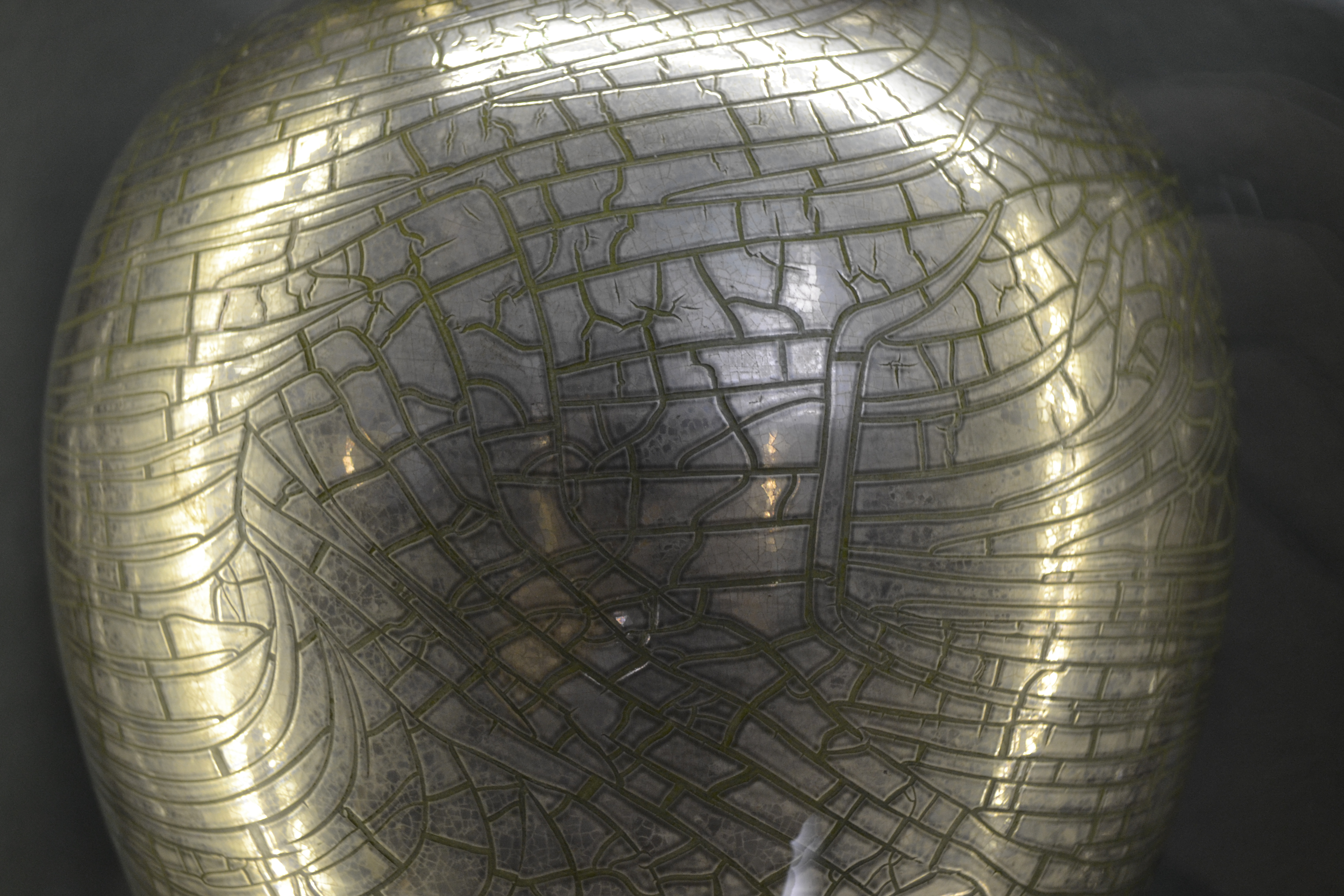
The distinctive Eltonware cracked glaze from the display at Clevedon Court

The central and largest room in the house is the great hall which was the original dining room and the accompanying screens passage which gave access to the hall from the service rooms. The staircase to the north of the hall was added in the 18th century. The state room on the western side of the first floor was damaged by fire in 1882; the oak panelling around the fireplace was brought from the Eltons' former house in Queen Square, Bristol. The chapel on the first floor has a rectangular window with reticulated tracery, which dominates the front of the house. The stained glass in the window was added after the 1882 fire. The justice room has had a variety of uses but takes its name from its function as the manorial court until the 18th century. The house contains many family portraits and other pictures as well as collections of Eltonware and Nailsea Glass and prints of bridges and railways.

== Gardens ==
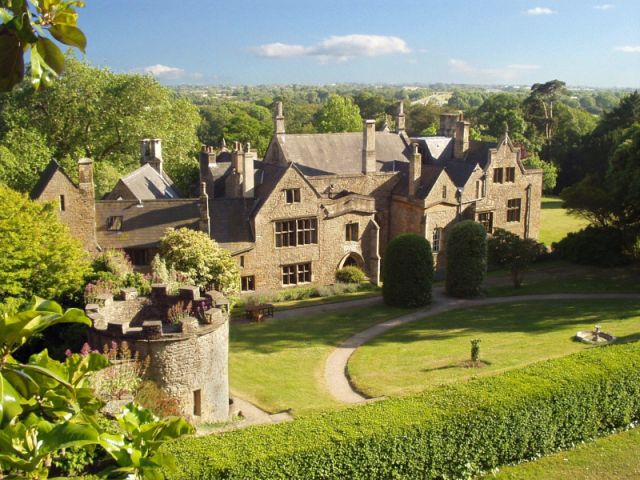
Clevedon Court from the rear garden

The gardens of Clevedon Court are listed (Grade II*) on the National Register of Historic Parks and Gardens.

Nestling at the foot of Court Hill, on a sheltered south-facing site largely protected from the winds which blow off the Bristol Channel, the front lawns of Clevedon Court run gently down to the perimeter wall. The bulk of the house conceals the dramatic architectural quality of the garden behind, carved out of the hillside in a series of terraces, which rise steeply back to merge with the woodland above. They are surrounded by what Gertrude Jekyll described as "One of the noblest ranges of terrace walls in England."

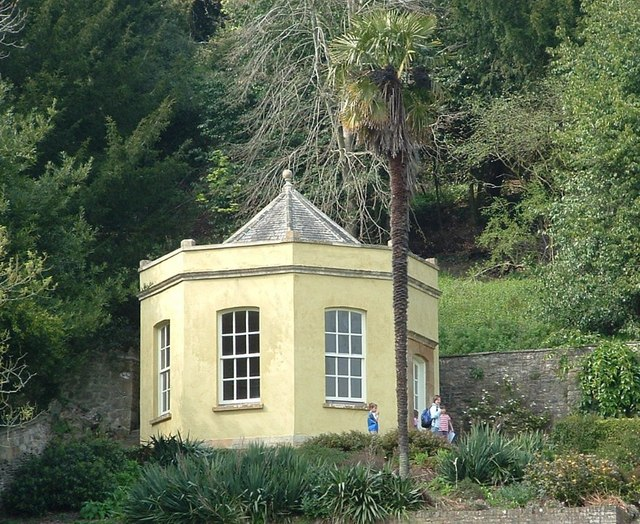
The Octagon

Although a court roll of 1389 mentions two gardens, there is no record of where these were sited, nor is there any record of when the terraces were constructed. The basic layout as known today was certainly in place by about 1730, as can be seen in a portrait of the house from that period. Later in the 18th century, the space behind the great pilastered wall was infilled to make the top terrace, which has wide views across the valley to the Mendip Hills beyond. The Octagon, a garden pavilion, was built about the same time, as was the more rustic summer house which faces it down the long grassy walk of the Pretty Terrace. Further modifications involved facing the lower retaining wall with rosy pink bricks, which were also used to build a double flight of steps below the Octagon. The garden is still largely in its 18th-century form, though small ponds and fountains were added in the 19th century and the once open hillside behind is now thickly wooded. A single rose arbour remained from the Edwardian garden but was on the verge of collapse when it was replaced with a new one in 2009, marking 300 years of the Elton family's presence at Clevedon Court.

Very little is known about the mid-18th century planting, although there remains, in front of the house, a gnarled black mulberry tree, which was described as ancient in 1822. However, 19th-century drawings and photographs record increasingly elaborate and fussy bedding schemes, finally swept away in the 1960s. Today there is a more informal style, emphasising the architectural character of the garden with its long straight sweeps of wall; it is also an easier style to maintain. In recent years, native wild plants have been allowed to mingle with rare and exotic specimens and continual thought is being given to contrasting textures and colours of foliage. The lower garden, below the front of the house, now has the air of a small arboretum with a number of fine specimen trees, such as a splendid late-leafing catalpa (an oriental plane tree) dominates this part of the garden and the grass at its foot is left uncut during the Spring, allowing camassias and bluebells to make a fine showing.

As with many English gardens, this one is at its best in May and June, when the magnolias are in bloom and plants, such as peonies and alliums, are flowering. An ongoing initiative is being made to put in plants which provide interest throughout the season or are at their best in the late summer. There are now many species and colours of lavender and plenty of agapanthus, crinum, nerines and day lilies, together with such rarities as a Heptacodium and an Arbutus menziesii.

== See also ==
- Grade I listed buildings in North Somerset
- List of National Trust properties in Somerset
