= Robert Membury =

English politician

Robert Membury was an English politician who was MP for Lyme Regis in 1386, February 1388, 1393, and 1394.
