= William Taverner (MP for Lyme Regis) =

English politician

William Taverner (fl. 1417) was an English politician.

He was a member (MP) of the parliament of England for Lyme Regis in 1417.
