= John Dorset =

Member of the Parliament of England

John Dorset was an English politician who was MP for Lyme Regis in September 1388, January 1390, 1391, and 1395, and mayor of Lyme Regis from 1397 to 1398. History of Parliament Online theorises that he was a son of Thomas Dorset.
