= John Stikelane =

English politician

John Stikelane was an English politician who was MP for Lyme Regis in 1394.
