= Francis Fane of Brympton =

British Member of Parliament

Francis Fane KC (c. 1698 – 28 May 1757) of Brympton d'Evercy, near Yeovil, Somerset, and later Wormsley, Oxfordshire was a Commissioner for Trade and the Plantations, and a British Member of Parliament.

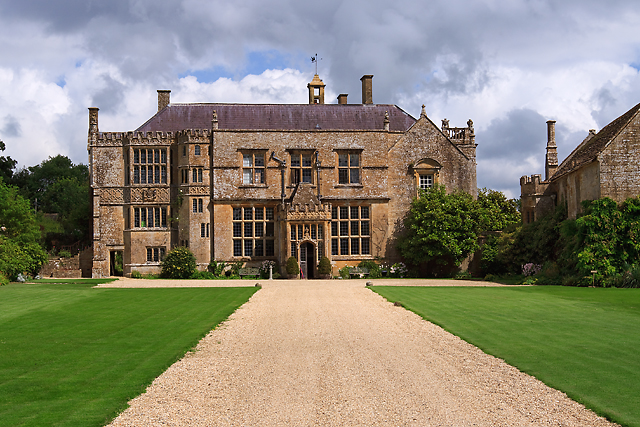
Brympton d'Evercy House

== Early life ==
Francis Fane was the eldest son of Henry Fane, a Bristol merchant. He was educated at King's College, Cambridge, graduating in 1715, after which he attended the Middle Temple and was called to the bar in 1721. As the eldest son he succeeded in 1726 to his father's estate. The next year he became a King's Counsellor and a Middle Temple bencher. He was appointed standing council to the Board of Trade and Plantations in 1725, a position he held until 1746. In 1731 he bought the estate at Brympton d'Evercy from the Receiver General.

== Parliamentary career ==
He initially represented Taunton in Somersetshire in the parliament which first sat for business on 27 January 1728 (N.S.). He also represented the same seat in the parliament summoned to meet on 13 June 1734 and then represented Petersfield in that summoned to meet on 25 June 1741.

He was also Solicitor-General to Queen Caroline between 13 May 1729 and her death in 1737, and chairman of the ways and means committee between 1739 and 1751. In 1746, being constituted one of the commissioners for the Board of Trade and the Plantations, he was re-elected to the parliament which first sat on business on 12 November 1747, representing Ilchester. He inherited some estates from his maternal uncle John Scrope in 1752. He resigned his place as a Commissioner of Trade and the Plantations in April 1756.

He died unmarried on 28 May 1757, aged fifty-nine, serving as the member for Lyme Regis and was buried at Lewknor in Oxfordshire.

== Family ==
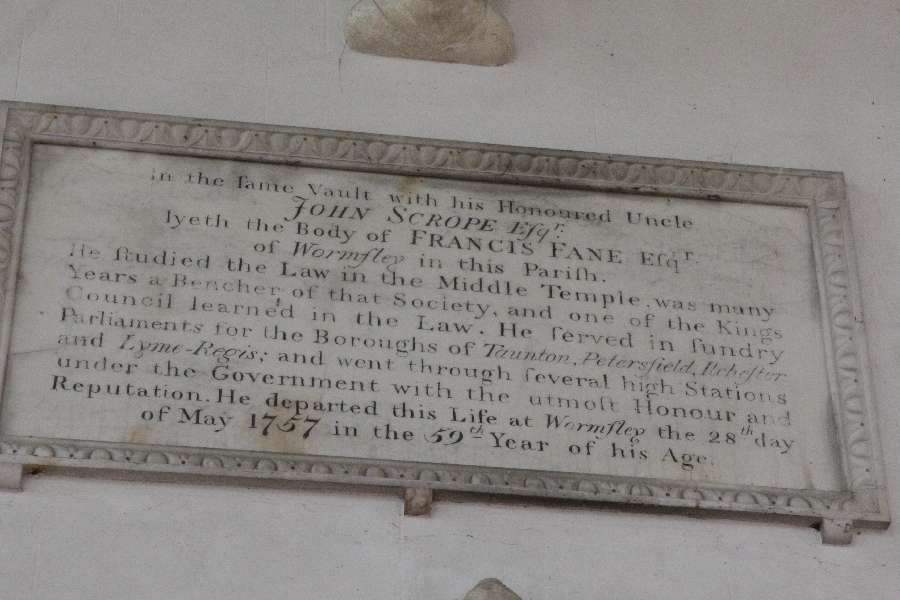
Memorial in St Margaret's Lewknor

Fane's father was a great-grandson of Francis Fane, 1st Earl of Westmorland. His younger brother and heir, Thomas, inherited the Earldom of Westmorland on the death of the 7th earl in 1762. His youngest brother was Henry Fane of Wormsley.

== Notes ==
Parliament of Great Britain
Preceded by James Smith; Abraham Elton	Member of Parliament for Taunton; 1727–41; With: George Speke 1727–1734; Henry William Berkeley Portman 1734–1741	Succeeded by Sir John Chapman; John Buck
Preceded by Sir William Jolliffe; Edward Gibbon	Member of Parliament for Petersfield; 1741–1747; With: John Jolliffe	Succeeded by John Jolliffe; William Conolly
Preceded by Charles Lockyer; Sir Robert Brown	Member of Parliament for Ilchester; 1747–1754; With: Thomas Lockyer	Succeeded by Thomas Lockyer; Hon. John Talbot
Preceded by Robert Henley; Thomas Fane	Member of Parliament for Lyme Regis; 1754–1757; With: Thomas Fane	Succeeded by Thomas Fane; Henry Fane
