= Thomas Fane, 8th Earl of Westmorland =

English politician and peer (1701–71)

The Right Honourable The Earl of Westmorland
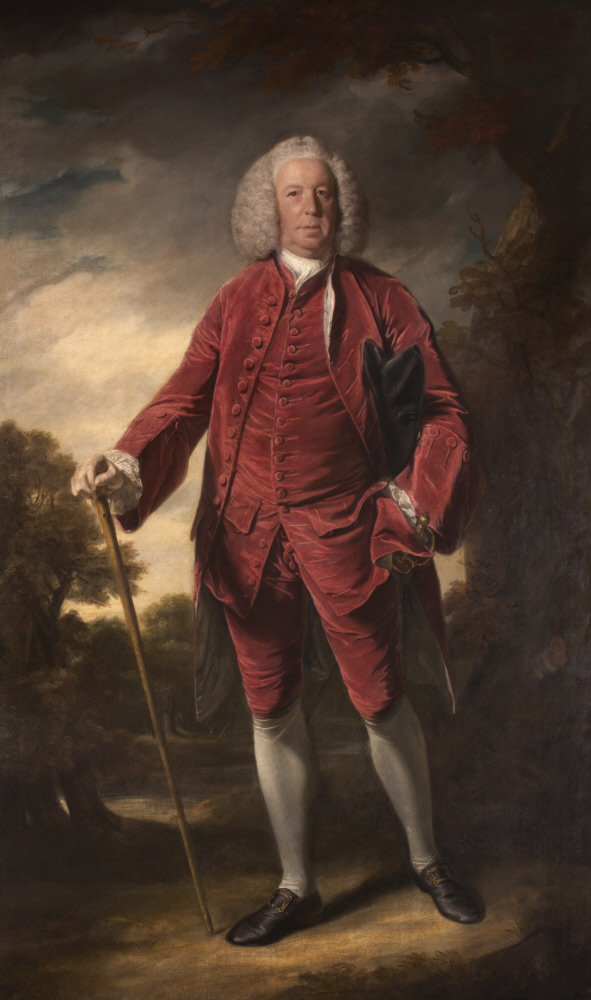

Member of the Great Britain Parliament for Lyme Regis
- In office 1753–1762 Serving with: Robert Henley 1753–1754; Francis Fane 1754–1757; Henry Fane of Wormsley 1757–1762
- Preceded by: John Scrope; Robert Henley
- Succeeded by: Henry Fane of Wormsley; Lord Burghersh

Personal details
- Born: March 1701
- Died: 25 November 1771
- Spouse: Elizabeth Swymmer
- Children: 4, including: John Fane, 9th Earl of Westmorland; Henry Fane
- Parents: Henry Fane of Brympton (father); Anne Scrope (mother)

Thomas Fane, 8th Earl of Westmorland (March 1701 – 25 November 1771) was an English politician and peer. He was an ancestor of the writer George Orwell.

== Biography ==
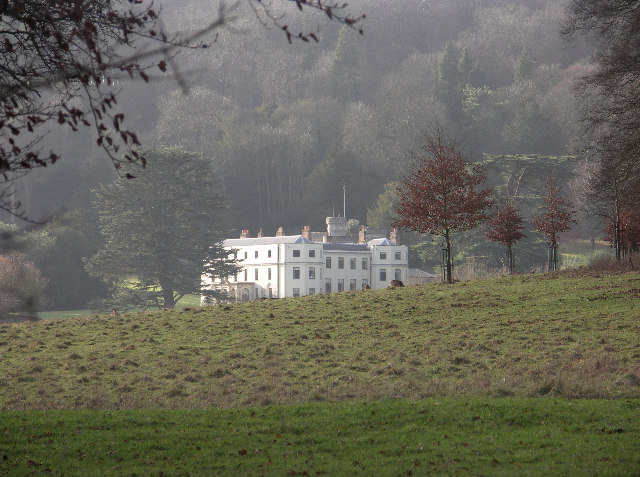
Wormsley Park, Buckinghamshire

Thomas Fane was the second son of Henry Fane of Brympton d'Evercy in Somerset and Anne Scrope, sister and coheir of John Scrope. Anne and John were the grandchildren of Colonel Adrian Scrope, a regicide of Charles I. Thomas Fane inherited John Scrope's fortune and mansion in Bristol, and Colonel Adrian Scrope's property in Oxfordshire and Buckinghamshire, which included Wormsley Park.

In 1757 he succeeded his unmarried elder brother Francis to their father's Brympton estate and in 1762 inherited the title of Earl of Westmoreland from John Fane, 7th Earl of Westmorland, his father's childless second-cousin. This brought him the Earls of Westmorland seat at Apethorpe Hall in Northamptonshire.

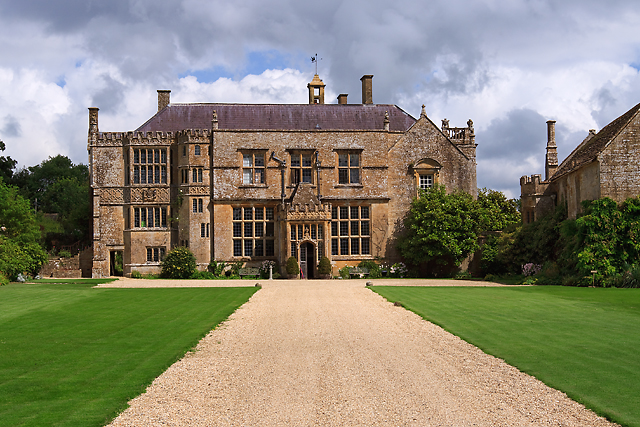
Brympton D'Evercy House, Somerset

In 1727 Thomas Fane married Elizabeth Swymmer, the daughter of Bristol sugar merchant William Swymmer. The couple had two sons and two daughters, including:

- John Fane, 9th Earl of Westmorland (1728–1774)
- Henry Fane (1739–1802)
- Mary, who married Charles Blair, of Whatcomb, Dorset. Charles Blair was the great-great-grandfather of Eric Arthur Blair, who wrote under the pen name George Orwell.

== Mr Fane ==
In 1761 Joshua Reynolds painted his full-length portrait entitled Mr Fane. Reynolds was paid 80 guineas for the work, which depicted the powder-wigged subject walking through a wooded landscape wearing rose-coloured velvet attire. In May 1903 the portrait was sold to Martin Colnaghi for 2,100 guineas.

== Arms ==
Coat of arms of Thomas Fane, 8th Earl of Westmorland
| Crest Out of a ducal coronet Or, a bull's head Argent pied Sable, armed of the first, charged on the neck with a rose Gules barbed and seeded Proper. Escutcheon Azure three dexter gauntlets backs affrontée Or. Supporters Dexter: a griffin per fesse Argent and Or, gorged with a plain collar and lined Sable; Sinister: a bull Argent pied Sable collared and lined Or, at the end of the line a ring and three staples of the last. Motto "NE VILE FANO" (Disgrace not the altar) |

== Notes ==
Parliament of Great Britain
| Preceded by John Scrope; Robert Henley | Member of Parliament for Lyme Regis; 1753–1762; With: Robert Henley 1753–1754; Francis Fane 1754–1757; Henry Fane 1757–1762 | Succeeded by Henry Fane; Lord Burghersh |
Peerage of England
| Preceded by John Fane | Earl of Westmorland; 1762–1771 | Succeeded by John Fane |
