= Walter Tropenell =

Member of the Parliament of England

Walter Tropenell was an English politician who was MP for Lyme Regis in October 1377, 1379, 1385, 1386, February 1388, September 1388, January 1390, and 1391.
