= Sir Abraham Elton, 1st Baronet =

English politician

Sir Abraham Elton, 1st Baronet (1654 – 9 February 1728), of Clevedon Court and Whitestaunton, Somerset, was an English Member of Parliament (MP).

He was the second son of Isaac Elton, Yeoman of Barton Regis, Bristol. His elder brother Jacob died in 1676 at the age of 30.

He was elected Mayor of Bristol for 1710–11, pricked High Sheriff of Gloucestershire for 1715–16 and created a baronet in the following year. He was elected Member of the Parliament of England for Bristol for 1722–1727.

Elton died in 1728. He married Mary, the daughter of Robert Jefferies of Pile Green, Gloucestershire, with whom he had 3 sons and a daughter. He was succeeded in the baronetcy by his eldest son Abraham

Baronetage of Great Britain
New title	Baronet (of Bristol); 1717–1728	Succeeded by Abraham Elton
