= John Scrope (MP) =

British lawyer and politician

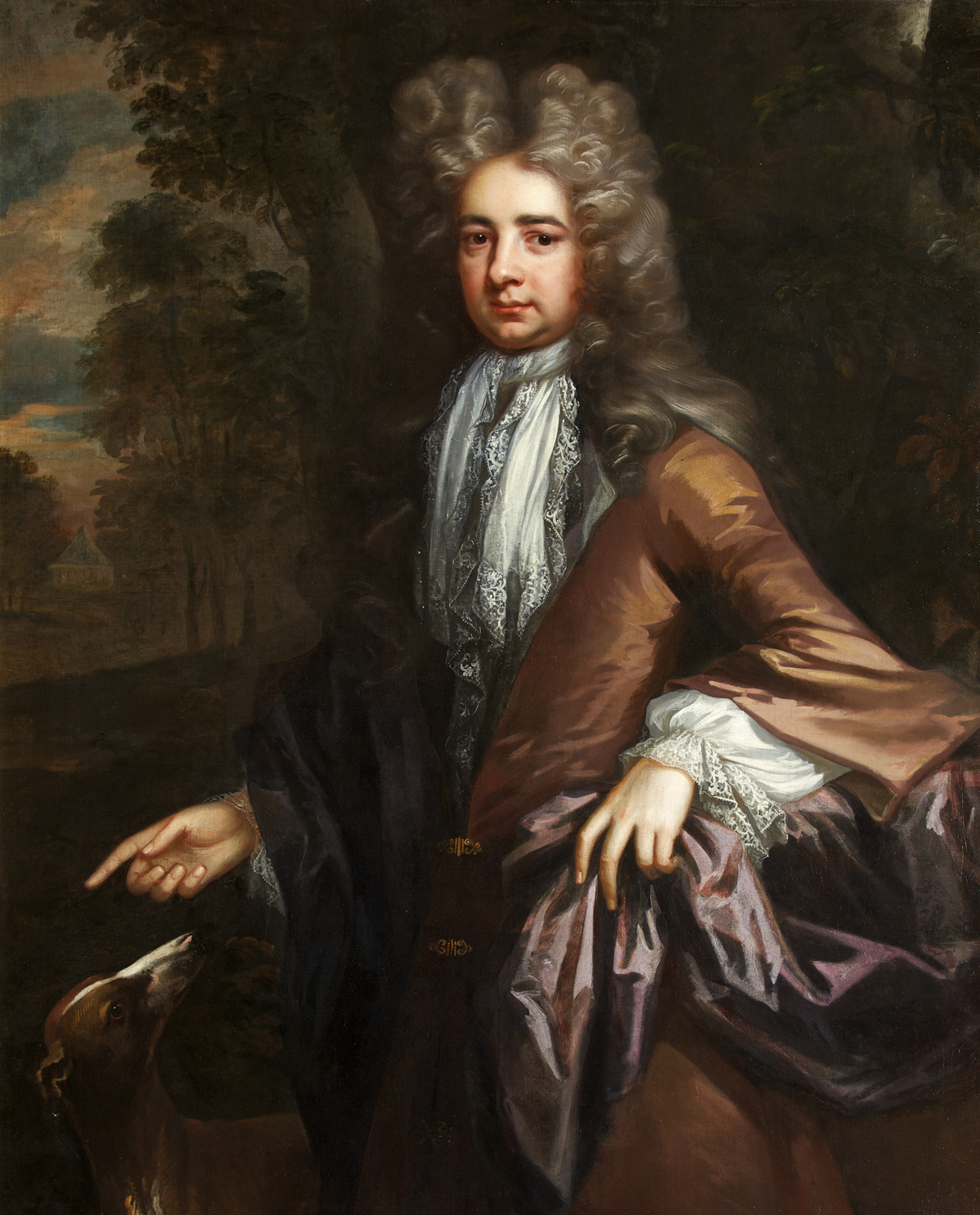
A painting of John Scrope attributed to Godfrey Kneller

John Scrope (circa 1662 – 9 April 1752) was a British lawyer and politician who sat in the House of Commons from 1722 to 1752.

== Early life ==
Scrope was the son of Thomas Scrope, a Bristol merchant, the third son and ultimate heir of Colonel Adrian Scrope of Wormsley in Oxfordshire, the latter hung drawn and quartered after the restoration as one of the regicides of Charles I.

Scrope was educated at the Middle Temple and called to the bar in 1692. In May 1708, following the Act of Union, he was appointed a Baron (judge) of the Court of Exchequer in Scotland. In this capacity he was one of the Commissioners of the Great Seal from 26 September 1710 (following Lord Cowper's resignation) to 19 October 1710, when Sir Simon Harcourt was appointed Lord Keeper.

== Secretary to the Treasury ==
Scrope was elected to the Parliament of Great Britain for Ripon at the general election of 1722 He exchanged his office of Baron of the Exchequer for that of Secretary to the Treasury. He later sat for his home city of Bristol and then from 1735 to his death for Lyme Regis.

=== Walpole and the Committee of Secrecy ===
Scrope was a close ally of Sir Robert Walpole, First Lord of the Treasury from 1721 to 1742, and after Walpole's resignation was called by a committee of parliament, the Committee of Secrecy under the chairmanship of Lord Limerick, to account for £1,059,211-6s-2d, part of £1,384,600-6s-3d which had passed through Treasury hands within ten years, that could not be accounted for. Scrope refused to account for the money, claiming, with solicitor Paxton, it had been secret service funds for which he was only accountable to the King.

=== Nicholas Paxton (1690-1744), solicitor to the Treasury ===
The attack on Walpole through Scrope failing, the Committee of Secrecy then summoned the Solicitor of the Treasury, Nicholas Paxton and his partners in his law practice though the partners were soon dismissed.

Through a number of hearings Paxton continued to decline to answer certain of the questions on the grounds that he might incriminate himself. The Committee considered there was no risk of Paxton incriminating himself and that he must answer. Paxton remained obdurate.

Paxton was confined in Newgate Prison, allowed his wife's company but neither was permitted communication with anyone nor the possession of pen or ink or paper. At the end of Parliament's term Paxton was quietly released. Dismissed from his post he died eighteen months later aged only 54. Horace Walpole, who had been junior secretary to Scrope, salved his family's conscience with regard to Paxton by making some provisions for Paxton's son then still at Eton. The Committee of Secrecy with its squabbles and failures was quickly forgotten, so too the immense sums involved.

Scrope's honesty, financial knowledge and ability was such that he remained Secretary to the Treasury until his death at about the age of 90, serving more than 28 years in that post.

== Death and legacy ==
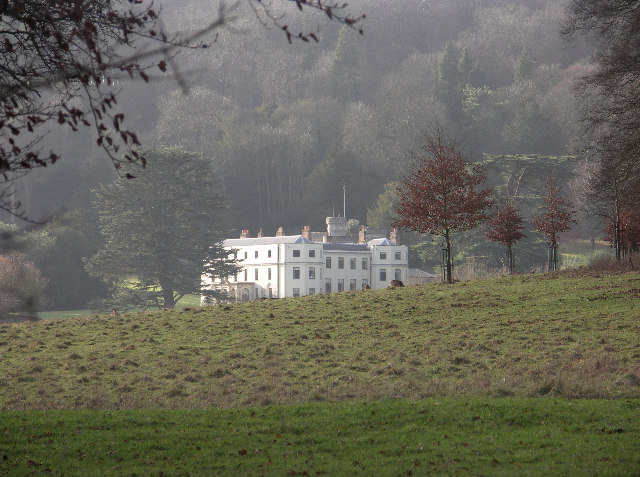
Wormsley Park

As Scrope died without issue, his estate of Wormsley passed to the descendants of his sister Anne (died 1720), who had married Henry Fane. Their second son, Thomas Fane, also a Bristol merchant, succeeded his uncle to Wormsley Park and as Member of Parliament for Lyme Regis. Fane also succeeded a distant cousin and became 8th Earl of Westmorland in 1762.

Parliament of Great Britain
Preceded by William Aislabie; William Aislabie II	Member of Parliament for Ripon; 1722–1727; With: William Aislabie II	Succeeded by William Aislabie II; William Aislabie III
Preceded by Sir Abraham Elton, Bt; Joseph Earle	Member of Parliament for Bristol; 1727–1734; With: Sir Abraham Elton, 2nd Bt	Succeeded by Sir Abraham Elton, 2nd Bt; Thomas Coster
Preceded by Henry Drax; Henry Holt Henley	Member of Parliament for Lyme Regis; 1734–1753; With: Henry Holt Henley to 1748; Robert Henley from 1748	Succeeded by Thomas Fane; Robert Henley
