= Fane (surname) =

Fane is a surname. (Note: Before the 18th century, it was not unusual for the name Fane also to be spelt Vane—See for example Sir Ralph Fane of Badsel Manor, executed at Tower Hill 1552—and so it is not unusual for different modern sources to use different spellings for the same person prior to the 18th century.)

== People with the surname ==
- Charles Fane de Salis (1860–1942), Bishop of Taunton from 1911 to 1930
- Sir Charles George Fane (1837–1909), British Admiral
- David Fane (born 1966), New Zealand actor
- Sir Edmund Fane (1837–1900), English diplomat, minister plenipotentiary to Denmark
- Elizabeth Fane (1510–1568), English writer and literary patron
- Francis Fane (disambiguation): various people, including:
  - Sir Francis Fane (Royalist) (1611–1681) of Fulbeck, supported the Royalist cause during the English Civil War
  - Sir Francis Fane (dramatist) (died 1691) of Fulbeck, Restoration playwright
  - Francis Fane (1700–1759), Tory MP and attorney general to the Prince of Wales
  - Francis Fane (soldier) (1824–1893), British Colonel who raised the Peshawar Light Horse
  - Francis Fane of Brympton (died 1757), Member of Parliament
  - Francis Fane of Spettisbury (1752–1813), Member of Parliament
  - Francis Fane (Royal Navy officer) (1778–1844), Rear-Admiral in the British Royal Navy during the Napoleonic Wars
- Frank Fane (1897–1980), Canadian farmer, World War I-era soldier, and politician
- Frederick Fane (1875–1960), Irish-born cricketer who captained England on five occasions
- Sir George Fane (of Burston) (1581–1640), English politician
- George Fane (1616–1663), Civil War royalist officer and member of parliament
- Lady Georgiana Fane (1801–1874), English heiress
- Harriet Arbuthnot (1793–1834), née Fane, an early 19th-century English diarist, social observer and political hostess on behalf of the Tory party
- Henry Fane (disambiguation): various people, including:
  - Henry Fane (died 1706) (c. 1650 – 1706), Whig Member of Parliament for Reading from 1689 to 1698; Irish Privy Councillor from 1690 until his death
  - Henry Fane (1739–1802) of Fulbeck (1739–1802) Member of Parliament for Lyme Regis 1772–1802
  - Sir Henry Fane (British Army officer) (1778–1840), of Fulbeck commanded brigades during several battles during the Peninsular War, and served both as a member of Parliament and as Commander-in-Chief of India
  - Henry Fane of Brympton (1669–1726), Bristol privateer; a great-grandson of Francis Fane, 1st Earl of Westmorland and father of Thomas Fane, 8th Earl of Westmorland
  - Henry Fane of Wormsley (1703–1777), one of the chief clerks of the Board of Treasury, one of the chief clerks to the Privy Council, and a Member of Parliament
  - Henry Hamlyn-Fane (1817–1868), known as Henry Fane until 1861: a British soldier and Conservative politician
  - Lt-Col Henry Sutton Fane (born 1805), English soldier and politician
- John Fane (disambiguation): various people, including:
  - Sir John Fane, captain at the battle of Poitiers 1356 who captured King John II of France
  - John Fane (1751–1824) (1751–1824), British Tory politician
  - John Fane (1775–1850) (1775–1850), MP and British Tory politician
  - John Fane (1804–1875) (1804–1875), Colonel in the British Army and a Conservative politician
  - John Ponsonby-Fane (1848–1916), English cricketer and malacologist
- Julian Henry Charles Fane (1827–1870), diplomatist and poet
- Margaret Fane (1887–1962), Australian novelist and poet
- Lady Mary Fane (1639–1681), daughter of Mildmay Fane, 2nd Earl of Westmorland
- Mildmay Fane (disambiguation): various people, including:
  - Mildmay Fane, 2nd Earl of Westmorland (1602–1666), English nobleman, politician, and writer
  - Mildmay Fane (1689–1715), English politician
  - Mildmay Fane (British Army officer) (1795-1868), British general
- Priscilla Fane, Countess of Westmorland (1793–1879), British linguist and artist
- Sir Ralph Fane or Vane of Badsel Manor (died 1552), English nobleman, executed at Tower Hill in 1552
- Richard Ponsonby-Fane (1878–1937), British academic, author, and Japanologist
- Robert George Cecil Fane (1796–1864), British Judge
- Sarah Villiers, Countess of Jersey (1785–1867), English noblewoman, the daughter of John Fane, 10th Earl of Westmorland and Sarah Anne Child; inherited a share in a bank
- Sir Spencer Ponsonby-Fane (1824–1915), of Brymton, diplomat, cortier and cricketer
- Sybil Fane, Countess of Westmorland (1871–1910), socialite and member of the British aristocracy
- Thomas Fane (disambiguation): various people, including:
  - Sir Thomas Fane (died 1589) (died 1589), MP, convicted of treason and involvement in the Wyatt's rebellion pardoned and married to Mary Neville, Baroness le Despencer daughter of Henry Nevill, 6th Baron Bergavenny. Father of Francis Fane, 1st Earl of Westmorland
  - Sir Thomas Fane (died 1692) (1626–1692), Member of Parliament for Maidstone
  - Thomas Fane (died 1807) (1760–1807), Member of Parliament for Lyme Regis
- Vere Fane (disambiguation): various people, including:
  - Vere Fane (MP) (1785-1863), Tory Member of Parliament for Lyme Regis from 1818 to 1826
  - Vere Fane, Tory MP for Petersfield and Lyme Regis
  - Sir Vere Bonamy Fane (1863–1924), General in the British Indian Army
  - Vere Fane Benett-Stanford (1840–1894), Conservative MP for Shaftesbury
- Violet Fane (1843–1905), British novelist, poet and essayist of the Victorian era
- Walter Fane (1828–1885), British general who raised Fane's Horse at Cawnpore in British India in 1860 for service in the Second Opium War
- William Vere Reeve King-Fane (1868–1943) of Fulbeck OBE, a member of the Fane family; an English landowner, soldier and High Sheriff of Lincolnshire

=== Disambiguation pages ===
- Anthony Fane (disambiguation)
- Charles Fane (disambiguation)
- Dorothy Fane (disambiguation)
- Sir Francis Fane of Fulbeck (disambiguation), disambiguation page
- Henry Fane (disambiguation), disambiguation page
- John Fane (disambiguation), disambiguation page
- Julian Fane (disambiguation)
- Thomas Fane (disambiguation), disambiguation page
- Vere Fane (disambiguation), disambiguation page

=== English Earls of Westmorland ===
- Francis Fane, 1st Earl of Westmorland (1580–1629)
- Mildmay Fane, 2nd Earl of Westmorland (1602–1666)
- Charles Fane, 3rd Earl of Westmorland (1635–1691)
- Vere Fane, 4th Earl of Westmorland (1645–1693)
- Vere Fane, 5th Earl of Westmorland (1678–1698)
- Thomas Fane, 6th Earl of Westmorland (1681–1736)
- John Fane, 7th Earl of Westmorland (1685–1762)
- Thomas Fane, 8th Earl of Westmorland (1701–1771)
- John Fane, 9th Earl of Westmorland (1728–1774)
- John Fane, 10th Earl of Westmorland (1759–1841)
- John Fane, 11th Earl of Westmorland (1784–1859)
- Francis Fane, 12th Earl of Westmorland (1825–1891)
- Anthony Mildmay Julian Fane, 13th Earl of Westmorland
- Vere Fane, 14th Earl of Westmorland (1893–1948)
- David Fane, 15th Earl of Westmorland (1924–1993)
- Anthony David Francis Henry Fane, 16th Earl of Westmorland (born 1951)
- Sarah Fane, Countess of Westmorland (1764–1793)

=== Irish viscounts ===
- Viscount Fane (of Basildon in Berkshire; Loughgur in Limerick; Clare in Armagh, and parts of Devon)
- Charles Fane, 1st Viscount Fane (1676–1744)
- Charles Fane, 2nd Viscount Fane (1708–1766)

== See also ==
- Fane (disambiguation)
