= Fulbeck =

Village in Lincolnshire, England

Coordinates: 53.040405°N 0.585611°W

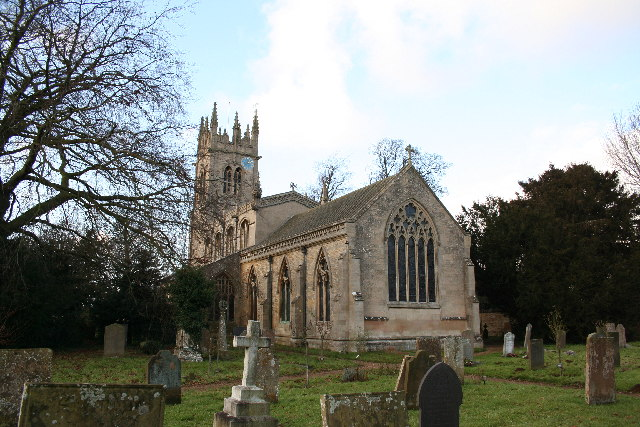
- Church of St Nicholas, Fulbeck

- Location within Lincolnshire
- Population: 513 (2011)
- OS grid reference: SK949501
  - London: 105 mi (169 km) S
- District: South Kesteven
- Shire county: Lincolnshire
- Region: East Midlands
- Country: England
- Sovereign state: United Kingdom
- Post town: Grantham
- Postcode district: NG32
- Dialling code: 01400
- Police: Lincolnshire
- Fire: Lincolnshire
- Ambulance: East Midlands
- UK Parliament: Grantham and Bourne

Fulbeck is a small village and civil parish in the South Kesteven district of Lincolnshire, England. The population (including Byards Leap) taken at the 2011 census was 513. The village is on the A607, 9 miles (14 km) north from Grantham and 8 miles (13 km) north-west from Sleaford. To the north is Leadenham, and to the south, Caythorpe.

== Toponymy ==
The place-name 'Fulbeck' is mentioned in an 11th-century document as "Fulebec". It derives from Old Norse fúll or Old Danish full "dirty", "stinking" (cognate of Old English fūl > English foul) and bekkr "stream".

Homonymy exists with Fuhlbek (Germany, Schleswig-Holstein) and Foulbec (France, Upper Normandy, Folebec 1066), and three stream-names in the three départements of Orne, Calvados and Manche (Lower Normandy).

Fulbeck represents the Scandinavian version of the English place-names (and stream-names) Fulbrook.

== History ==
Fulbeck Grade I listed Anglican church is dedicated to St Nicholas. Originating from the 10th century, there were further additions and changes up to the 18th. The church, which was restored in 1888, retains a variety of styles from Norman to Perpendicular, and a Transitional-Norman font. The tower has eight crocketed pinnacles, and within the church are many monuments to the Fane family of Fulbeck Hall.

In 1885 Kelly's Directory recorded that the chief crops grown in the area were wheat, barley, seeds and turnips, and that the village had both a Wesleyan and a Primitive Methodist chapel, and an ancient cross. The base and shaft are all that remains of the 14th-century cross.

The village public house is the Hare and Hounds, a Grade II listed building originating from the 17th century.

In 1986 the former airfield of RAF Fulbeck was considered by the United Kingdom government body, NIREX, as one possible site for an underground deep storage facility for the country's nuclear waste. Geological investigations took place but plans for the facility were abandoned in 1987. The RAF station was used from October 1944 until the end of the war by two Lancaster squadrons, one of which was No 189 Squadron RAF.

== Fulbeck Hall ==
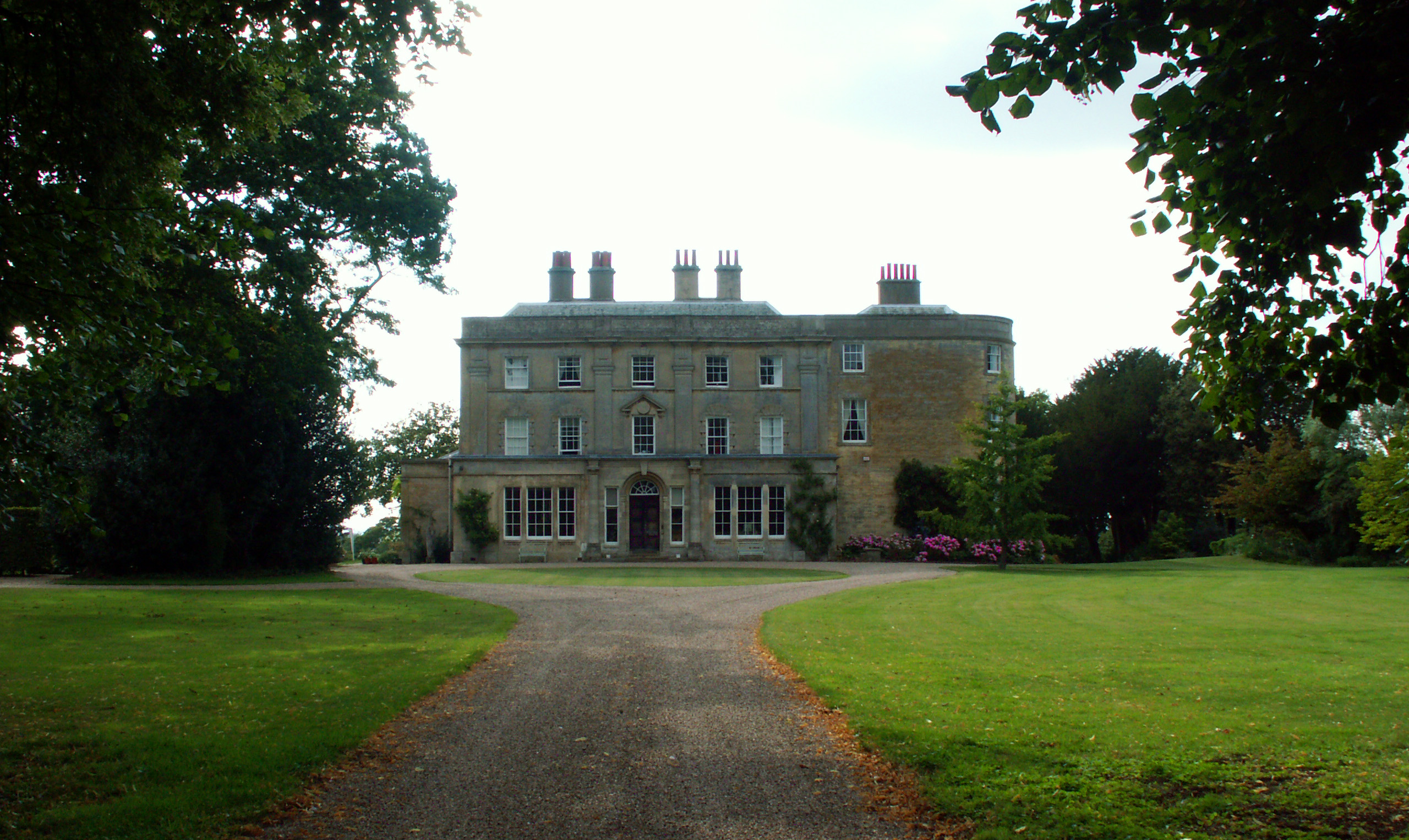
Fulbeck Hall

Fulbeck Hall, the home of the Fane family since 1632, has been much altered. It is now mostly built in the classically inspired style of the 18th century, however there is a Tudor wing at the back of the hall and large Tudor cellars.

The hall was purchased, in 1622, by Francis Fane, 1st Earl of Westmorland, 8th Baron le Despenser and de jure 8th and 6th Baron Bergavenny, of Apethorpe Hall, Northamptonshire, from Sir George Manners, who remained in residence until he became the 7th Earl of Rutland in 1632. The hall then went to the Earl of Westmorland's son, Sir Francis Fane, a courtier, Royalist and commander of the King's forces at Doncaster and Lincoln.

Under the Commonwealth, the estate was confiscated, however, Sir Francis Fane was allowed to buy it back, and before the Restoration of Charles II in 1660, he and his wife Elizabeth Darcy, daughter of Sir Edward Darcy MP, grandson of the executed traitor Thomas Darcy, 1st Baron Darcy de Darcy, occupied much of their time in rebuilding the Hall in Restoration style. It was burned down 30 December 1731, and was rebuilt 1732–1733, with only the back wings and cellars surviving from the early 17th century.

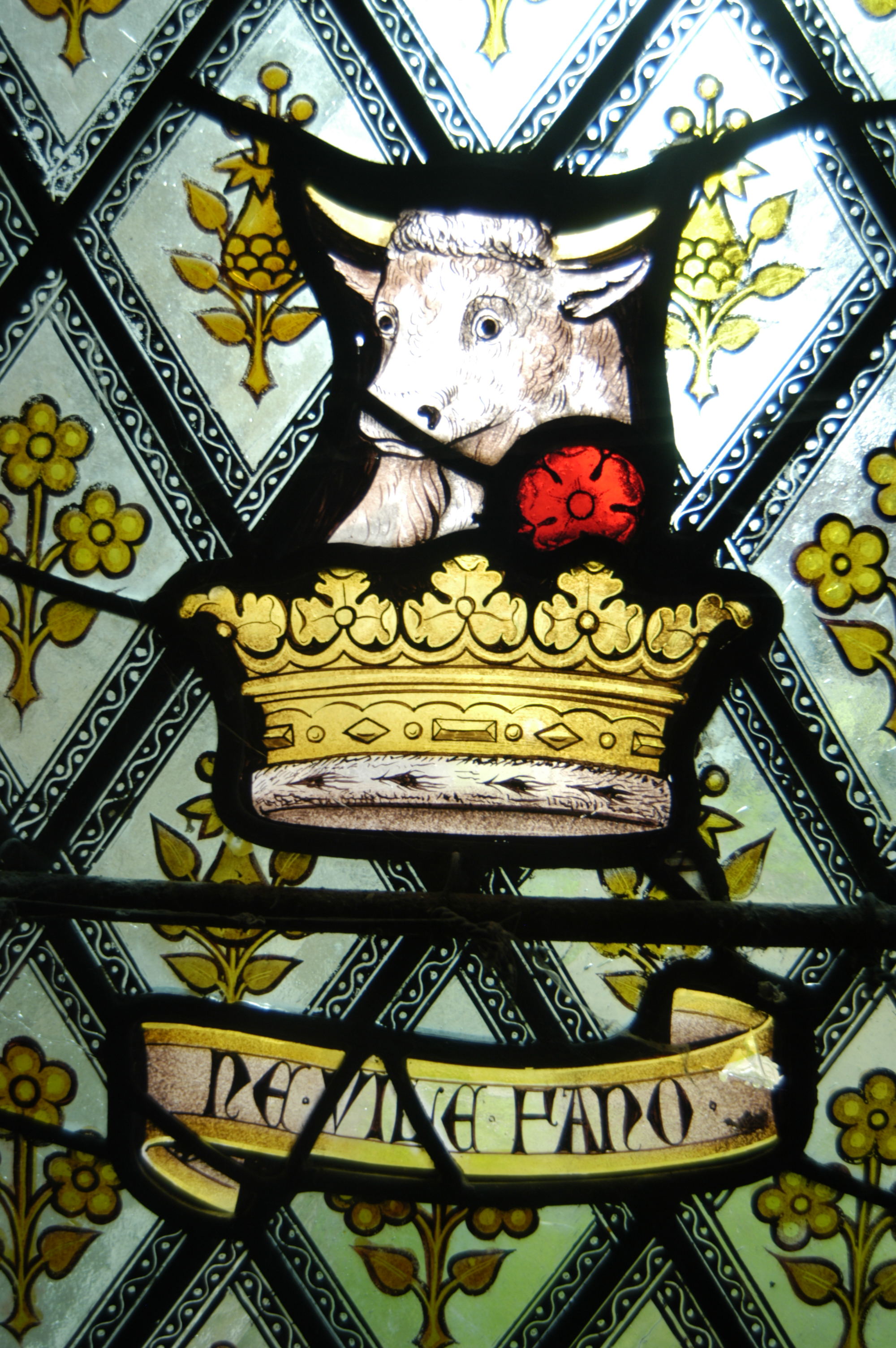
The Fane (Neville inspired) crest in Fulbeck's church.

His son, also Sir Francis, married Hannah Rushworth daughter of John Rushworth MP and private secretary to Oliver Cromwell . Rushworth was a republican and historian who is credited with drafting the Bill that abolished the monarchy, House of Lords and established England as a Republic, and many of his works and words were used by Thomas Jefferson when he drafted the American Declaration of Independence.

In 1767 Fulbeck Hall was left to Henry Fane of Brympton owner of Brympton d'Evercy who was a grandson of Sir Francis Fane, the second of Fulbeck and Hannah Rushworth. Henry Fane of Brymton made a fortune as a successful Bristol privateer and he left his Wormesley estates in Oxfordshire to his younger son Henry and his estates in Somerset, Dorset, and Lincolnshire were left to his eldest son Thomas Fane, 8th Earl of Westmorland Thomas, 8th earl inherited the estates of his father and his cousin the 7th Earl making him one of the richest landowners in England. He left Fulbeck Hall to his younger son the Hon Henry Fane MP in 1783. He was a clerk in the Treasury before in 1772 he became Keeper of the King's Private Roads, Gates and Bridges.

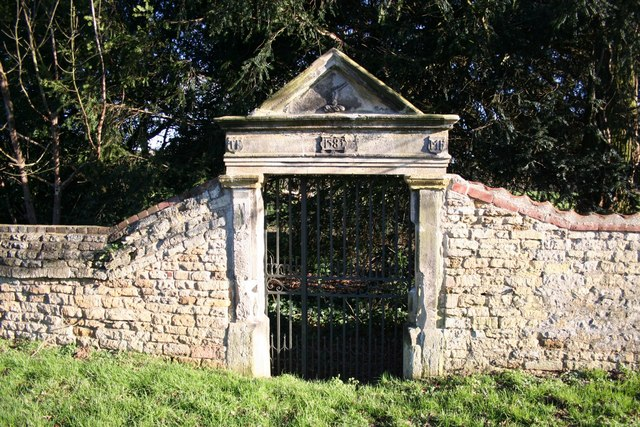
Elizabethan gateway near Fulbeck Hall

During the 19th century the house was home to General Sir Henry Fane MP for Lyme Regis who was Commander-in-Chief, India as well as his brother General Mildmay Fane. Sir Henry bequeathed a life interest in the estate to his eldest son Col. Henry Fane(d.1836). His nephew General Walter Fane who raised Fane's Horse a regiment of volunteers to fight in China during the Second Opium War succeeded him at Fulbeck Hall. This regiment still exists as part of Pakistan's armed forces. General Walter Fane is not to be confused with his brother Colonel Francis Fane of Fulbeck Manor, who raised the Peshawar Light Horse in 1857 as an irregular cavalry unit to fight against the mutineers during the Indian Mutiny. This regiment was disbanded in 1903. In the early 20th century the house was home to Colonel William Vere Reeve King-Fane.

During the Second World War 1939-1945 the house was requisitioned by the British Armed Forces and it was the location of the 1st Airborne Division before they left the United Kingdom for the Battle of Arnhem. There is still an Arnhem Museum at the house commemorating the soldiers based in the house during the war.

All of the contents of Fulbeck Hall were sold by Sotheby's in October 2002. Included in the sale were letters and mementos given by the Duke of Wellington to two members of the Fane family – Harriet Fane, (better known as the early 19th-century diarist Mrs Arbuthnot) and her cousin Lady Georgiana Fane.
