= General Fane =

General Fane may refer to:

- Henry Fane (British Army officer) (1778–1840), British Indian Army general
- Mildmay Fane (British Army officer) (1795–1868), British Army general
- Vere Bonamy Fane (1863–1924), British Indian Army major general
- Walter Fane (1828–1885), British Indian Army major general
- John Fane, 11th Earl of Westmorland (1784–1859), British Army general
- John Fane, 7th Earl of Westmorland (1685–1762), British Army general
