= Shiu-Kay Kan =

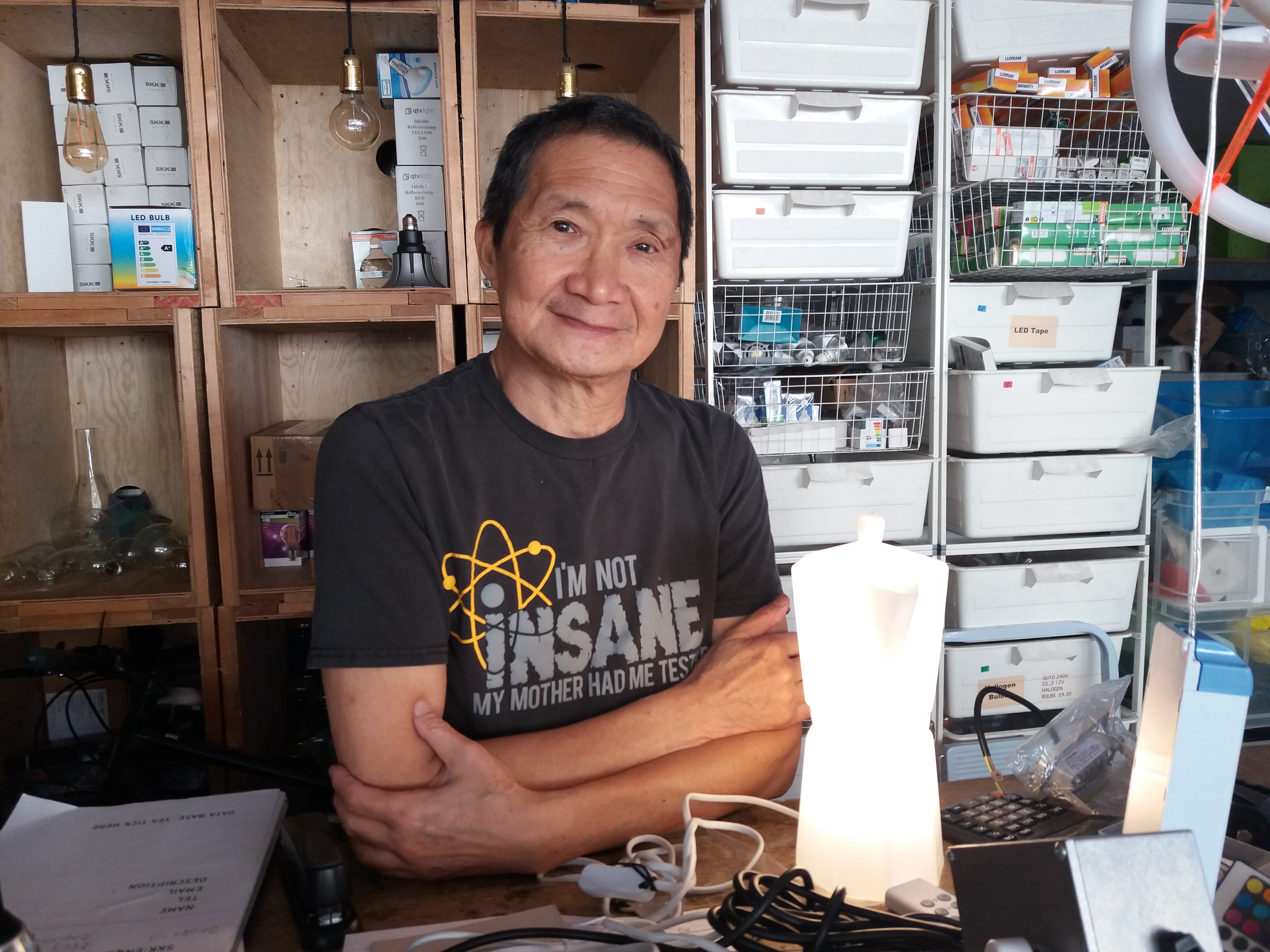
- Born: 1949
- Occupation(s): Architect and designer

Shiu-Kay Kan (Hong Kong, 1949) is a British architect, industrial designer, and lighting designer. After making a successful start as an architect in the 1980s he turned his attention to designing lights. He has sold his design to some clients (e.g. House of Fraser, Habitat or IKEA).

== Biography ==
Shiu-Kay was born in Hong-Kong, before moving to Edinburgh and studied at Telford College of Arts and Technology. In 1969 he went to the Polytechnic of Central London (now University of Westminster) to study architecture. In 1974 he wrote his thesis paper on building architecture out of waste, and in 1976 he received his RIBA qualification.

In the 1970s, Kan spent his early career as an architect working for Sir Norman Foster on Hong Kong HQ of HSBC and SAPA. He also worked for Nicholas Grimshaw and Terry Farrell on public housing. He then went to Milan to pursue a career as a designer and had a brief stint as a 3D designer for the fashion house Fiorucci. He was denied a job for Flos Lighting, so he went back to London to start his own company SKK Lighting in 1979 in Belsize Village NW London. He has been Managing Director since then. In the 1990s SKK moved to Islington and settled in Soho, London.

After his initial success in the early 1980s, Shiu-Kay sold his design to some major clients (e.g., House of Fraser, Habitat, and IKEA). When he started his architectural lighting department in 1982, this proved to be equally as successful as his "soft option" products. Some of his projects include, for example, the St Anne Shopping Centre, BT, AA, BA, Next, and Oasis. He has also consulted and designed for the former British Prime Minister Margaret Thatcher and renowned musicians from bands like U2 and Coldplay. He has been involved in lighting diverse objects (e.g., hotels, stores, restaurants, factories, national monuments) and very special birthday parties, such as Margaret Thatcher’s. He is also known for his work on the Memorial Gate on Constitutional Hill in London. Erected in honour of the Commonwealth soldiers who lost their lives in World War II, the gate presented a challenge to Shiu-Kay.

In 1983, he won the Philips lighting award on PL lamps.

== Work ==
After making a successful start as an architect, Shiu-Kay turned his attention to designing lights. In the 1980s, he has designed a new generation of paper lanterns, which vary from the original globe shapes originally introduced by Isamu Noguchi in the 1950s. His designs are made of tissue paper and some of silk, whereas the originals are made of rice paper.

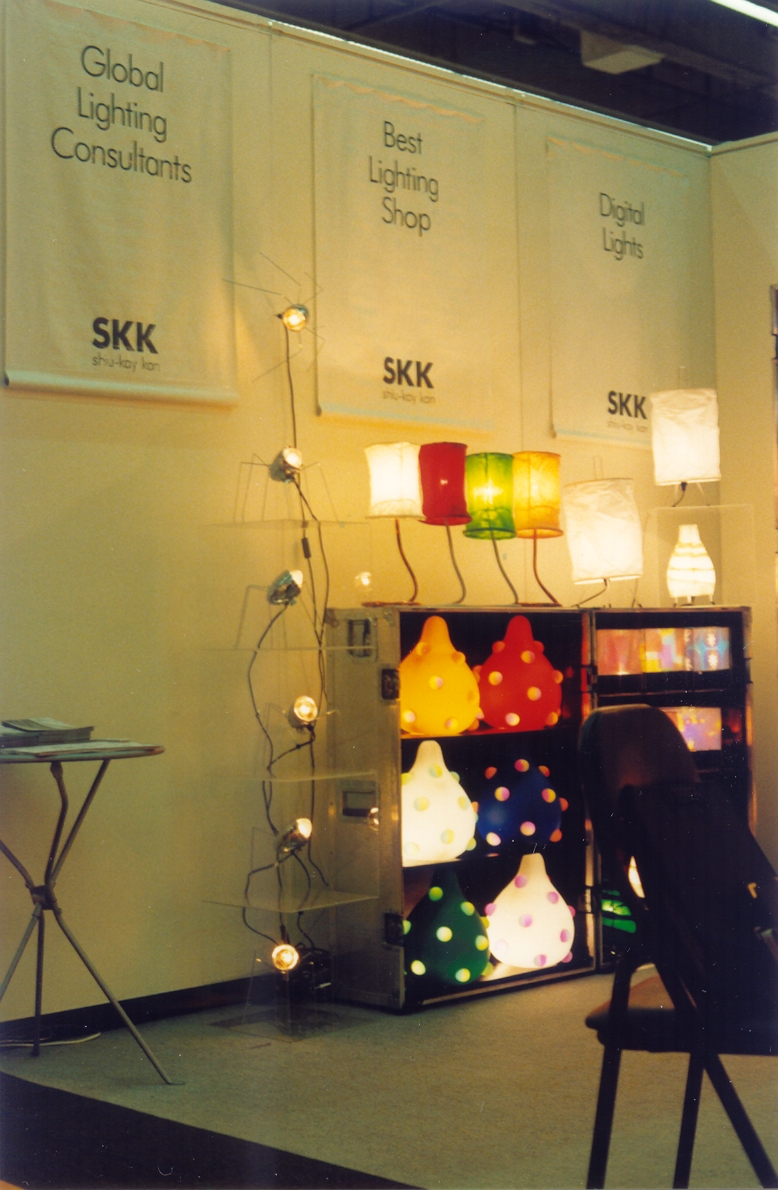
SKK at Frankfurt Messe, Germany 1998.

=== Garbage architecture ===
In the 1970s, Kan went to study garbage architecture at the Architectural Association, in Bedford Square, London, under Martin Pawley and subsequently won a scholarship to go to a seminar at the Tallahassee University in Florida, USA.

The garbage architectural design of a conservatory built of secondary wastes of tin cans, cardboard and Watney beer crates, caused a lot of attention from the press and Shiu-Kay appeared on Blue Peter, presented by John Noakes and Percy Thrower.

=== Lighting design ===
In Milan, Kan became heavily influenced by the style of Milanese and developed a strong interest in the designer lighting company. His first design was the "Kite Light" which he designed while working with Mark Sutton Vane. This proved to be a very successful design and was sold to the Conran Shop, which motivated Shiu-Kay on to take up lighting design full-time.
