= Francis Fane =

Francis Fane may refer to:

- Francis Fane, 1st Earl of Westmorland (1580–1629), Member of Parliament and English peer
- Francis Fane of Fulbeck (disambiguation)
  - Sir Francis Fane (Royalist) (c. 1611–1681?), son of Francis Fane, 1st Earl of Westmorland
  - Sir Francis Fane (dramatist) (died 1691), grandson of Francis Fane, 1st Earl of Westmorland, English Restoration dramatist
- Francis Fane, 12th Earl of Westmorland (1825–1891), British soldier and racehorse owner
- Francis Fane of Brympton (died 1757), MP for Taunton 1727–1741, Petersfield 1741–1747, Ilchester 1747–1754 and Lyme Regis 1754–1757
- Francis Fane of Spettisbury (1752–1813), MP for Lyme Regis 1777–1780 and Dorchester 1790–1807
- Francis Fane (Royal Navy officer) (1778–1844), Royal Navy officer
- Francis Fane (soldier) (1824–1893), English officer in the British Army
- Frank Fane (1897–1980), Canadian politician
