= Vane (surname) =

Vane is a surname. Notable people with the surname include: (Note: Before the 18th century it was not unusual for the name Vane also to be spelt Fane — See for example Sir Ralph Vane of Badsel Manor, executed at Tower Hill 1552 — and so it is not unusual for different modern sources to use different spellings for the same person prior to the 18th century.)

- Charles Vane (hanged 1721), English pirate who preyed upon English and French shipping.
- Charles Vane-Tempest-Stewart, 6th Marquess of Londonderry (1852–1915), British Conservative politician
- Charles Vane-Tempest-Stewart, 7th Marquess of Londonderry (1878–1949), Secretary of State for Air in the 1930s
- Christopher Vane, 1st Baron Barnard (1653–1723), English peer
- Cristina Vane, country blues singer, guitarist, banjoist and songwriter
- Edith Vane-Tempest-Stewart, Marchioness of Londonderry (1878–1959), socialite and philanthropist
- Sir Francis Vane, Baronet, (1861–1934), founder of the Order of World Scouts
- George Vane-Tempest, 5th Marquess of Londonderry (1821–1884), Anglo-Irish aristocrat, businessman and Conservative politician
- Henry Vane:
  - Sir Henry Vane the Elder (1589–1655), English courtier, father of Henry Vane the Younger
  - Sir Henry Vane the Younger (1613–1662), statesman, Puritan, son of Henry Vane the Elder
  - Henry Vane, 1st Earl of Darlington (c. 1705–1758) (c. 1705 – 6 March 1758), an English peer, the son of Gilbert Vane, 2nd Baron Barnard
  - Henry Vane, 2nd Earl of Darlington (1726–1792), English peer, the son of the 1st Earl
- John Vane, 11th Baron Barnard (21 September 1923 — 3 April 2016), British peer, the son of Christopher Vane, 10th Baron Barnard
- John Robert Vane (1927–2004), English pharmacologist
- Kathleen (Kitty) Vane (1891 - 1965), New Zealand painter
- Mark Sutton Vane, English architectural lighting designer
- Richard Fletcher-Vane, 2nd Baron Inglewood (b. 1951), Conservative Party politician in the United Kingdom
- Robin Vane-Tempest-Stewart, 8th Marquess of Londonderry (1902–1955), Irish peer and politician
- William Vane, 1st Duke of Cleveland (1766–1842), British peer
- William Fletcher-Vane, 1st Baron Inglewood (1909–1989), British politician
- Zachary A. Vane, American politician

== Fictional characters ==
- Harriet Vane, a fictional character in the works of British writer Dorothy L. Sayers (1893–1957)
- Protagonists from The Vane Sisters, short story by Vladimir Nabokov
