= Mildmay Fane (disambiguation) =

Mildmay Fane (1689–1715) was a British politician who sat in the House of Commons.

Mildmay Fane may also refer to:

- Mildmay Fane, 2nd Earl of Westmorland (1602–1666), English nobleman, politician, and writer
- Mildmay Fane (British Army officer) (1795–1868), British general
