= Charles Fane =

Charles Fane may refer to:

- Charles Fane, 3rd Earl of Westmorland (1635–1691), English politician
- Charles Fane, 1st Viscount Fane (1676–1744), Anglo-Irish courtier, politician and a landowner
- Charles Fane, 2nd Viscount Fane (1708–1766), landowner in Ireland and England, a Whig Member of Parliament
- Charles Fane de Salis
- Charles George Fane (1837–1909), British Royal Navy officer
