= Vere Fane =

Vere Fane may refer to:

- Vere Fane, 4th Earl of Westmorland (1645–1693)
- Vere Fane, 5th Earl of Westmorland (1678–1699), Earl of Westmorland
- Vere Fane (MP) (1785–1863), Member of Parliament for Lyme Regis
- Vere Fane Benett-Stanford (1840–1894) Conservative MP Shaftesbury
- Vere Fane, 14th Earl of Westmorland (1893–1948)
- Vere Bonamy Fane (1863–1924), General in the British Indian Army
- William Vere Reeve King-Fane of Fulbeck (1868–1943) OBE was a member of the Fane family, an English landowner, soldier and High Sheriff of Lincolnshire
