= Henry Fane =

Henry Fane may refer to:

- Henry Fane (died 1580), member of parliament (MP) for Winchelsea
- Henry Fane (died 1596), MP for Hythe
- Sir Henry Fane (died 1706) (c. 1650–1706), MP for Reading
- Henry Fane of Brympton (1669–1726), English merchant
- Henry Fane of Wormsley (1703–1777), British politician, MP for Lyme Regis
- Henry Fane (1739–1802), British politician, MP for Lyme Regis
- Henry Hamlyn-Fane (1817–1868), British soldier and politician, MP for Hampshire South
- Sir Henry Fane (British Army officer) (1778–1840), general and MP for Lyme Regis, for Sandwich, and for Hastings
- Henry Sutton Fane (1804–1857), MP for Lyme Regis
- Henry William Newman Fane (1897–1976), English local politician in Kesteven, Lincolnshire
