= Robert Fane =

English judge

Robert George Cecil Fane (8 May 1796– 4 October 1864) was an English judge.

== Biography ==
Fane, fourteenth and youngest child of the Hon. Henry Fane and Anne, daughter of Edward Buckley Batson, and brother of General Sir Henry Fane and Harriet Arbuthnot, was born on 8 May 1796, and educated at Charterhouse School from 1808 to 1813. He matriculated from Balliol College, Oxford, on 22 May 1813, and was afterwards a demy and fellow (1824–35) of Magdalen College, Oxford, where he proceeded B.A. in 1817 and M.A. in 1819. He was called to the bar at Lincoln's Inn on 1 June 1821, and soon enjoyed a considerable practice as an equity barrister.

In 1823 Lord Eldon appointed him one of the five commissioners of the "Thirteenth List", and on 2 December 1831 he was nominated by Lord Brougham one of the six commissioners who were to hold office under the new act establishing the Court of Bankruptcy.

In later life his judicial bearing was marked by an eccentricity of manner, but although his decisions were frequently the subject of comment, very few of his judgments were reversed on appeal. As a member of the Law Amendment Society he was a constant attendant at the weekly meetings in Lancaster Place.

He was much interested in railway schemes, and was for some years a director of the Eastern Counties Railway.

Fane was an ardent lover of field sports, and was well known in the Leicester hunts; he was also a patron of the fine arts, and possessed a collection of paintings.

He died at the Burdon Hotel, Weymouth, on 4 October 1864.

He married first, 24 June 1835, Isabella Mary, youngest daughter of Admiral Sir Eliab Harvey, G.C.B.; she died at Rolls Park, Chigwell, on 15 December 1838; and secondly, on 7 September 1841, Harriet Anne, only daughter of Admiral the Hon. Sir Henry Blackwood, baronet; she died on 31 December 1869. They had a London home at 4 Upper Brook Street, Mayfair. By his first wife Fane had no issue. By his second wife he had two daughters, Cicely Harriette Fane (1846 – 1933) and Blanche Anna Fane (1847 – 1935), and two sons, Lionel Arthur (1851 - 1872) and Cecil Francis William (1856-1914) who married 8 May 1880 Lady Augusta Fanny Rous (1858 – 1950), daughter of John Rous, 2nd Earl of Stradbroke.

== Publications ==
- Letter addressed to the Attorney-General [Sir John Campbell] on his Bill for the Abolition of Imprisonment for Debt, 1837
- Bankruptcy Reform, in a series of Letters addressed to Sir R. Peel, letters i–iii, 1838
- Bankruptcy Reform, letters iv–vii, 1838
- Observations on the proposed Abolition of Imprisonment for Debts on Mesne Process, in a Letter to Sir R. Peel, 1838
- Outline of a Plan for Improving the Law of Debtor and Creditor, without Abolishing Imprisonment for Debt, 1844
- A Letter to Lord Cottenham on the present position of Her Majesty's Commissioners of the Court of Bankruptcy, and suggesting a more extended use of that Court in matters of Account, 1846
- Bankruptcy Reform, in a series of Letters addressed to W. Hawes, Esq., letters i–iv, 1848
- Ministry of Justice; its necessity as an Instrument of Law Refor, 1848
- Sketch of an Act to Establish Tenant-Right in conformity to the principles suggested in an article in the “Law Review” for November 1848, signed C. F., 1849
- Tenant-Right, its necessity as a means of promoting good Farming, No. ii, 1849

== Sources ==
- This article incorporates text from a publication now in the public domain: "Fane, Robert George Cecil". Dictionary of National Biography. London: Smith, Elder & Co. 1885–1900.
