= 98th (Prince of Wales's) Regiment of Foot =

98th (The Prince of Wales's) Regiment of Foot
- Active: 1824–1881
- Disbanded: 1881, amalgamated with 64th Foot to become The Prince of Wales's (North Staffordshire) Regiment
- Country: United Kingdom
- Allegiance: British Crown
- Branch: British Army
- Type: Infantry
- Role: Line Infantry
- Size: One battalion
- March: God Bless the Prince of Wales
- Engagements: First Opium War; Second Anglo-Sikh War

Commanders
- Colonel of the Regiment: The Prince of Wales
- Notable commanders: Sir Colin Campbell

The 98th (Prince of Wales) Regiment of Foot was an infantry regiment of the British Army. It was originally raised in 1824 as the 98th Regiment of Foot, before assuming the title of the 98th (Prince of Wales) Regiment of Foot in 1876. Later, in 1881, following the Childers Reforms of the British Army, the regiment was amalgamated with the 64th Regiment of Foot to become the Prince of Wales's (North Staffordshire) Regiment. As the 64th Foot was senior to the 98th, the 98th became the 2nd Battalion in the new regiment. Throughout the course of the regiment's existence it served mostly overseas in South Africa, China and India.

== History ==
=== Formation ===
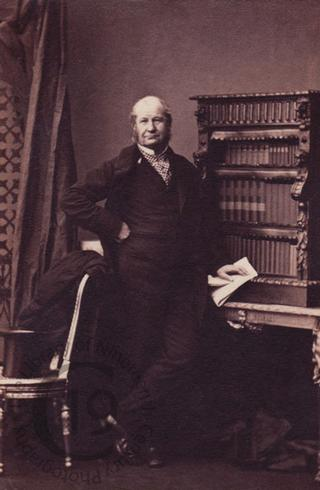
Mildmay Fane, the regiment's founder

The 98th Foot was raised in Chichester by Lieutenant Colonel Mildmay Fane in response to the threat posed by the French intervention in Spain in March 1824. It was the sixth regiment to be numbered the 98th Foot. The first Colonel of the regiment was Major General Henry Conran. The first set of colours were presented by the Duchess of Richmond at a ceremony at Chichester on 6 October 1824.

In December 1824 the new regiment was posted to South Africa where for all bar two years of its 13-year tour it was based in Cape Town, the other two years being in Grahamstown. During the entire tour no active service was seen. Returning to England in 1837 the regiment was based for two years in Newcastle upon Tyne where it was frequently called out to support the civil powers during the Chartist unrests. At this point command of the regiment was taken over by its most famous commanding officer, Sir Colin Campbell who commanded the regiment for 12 years between 1835 and 1847.

=== The Victorian era ===
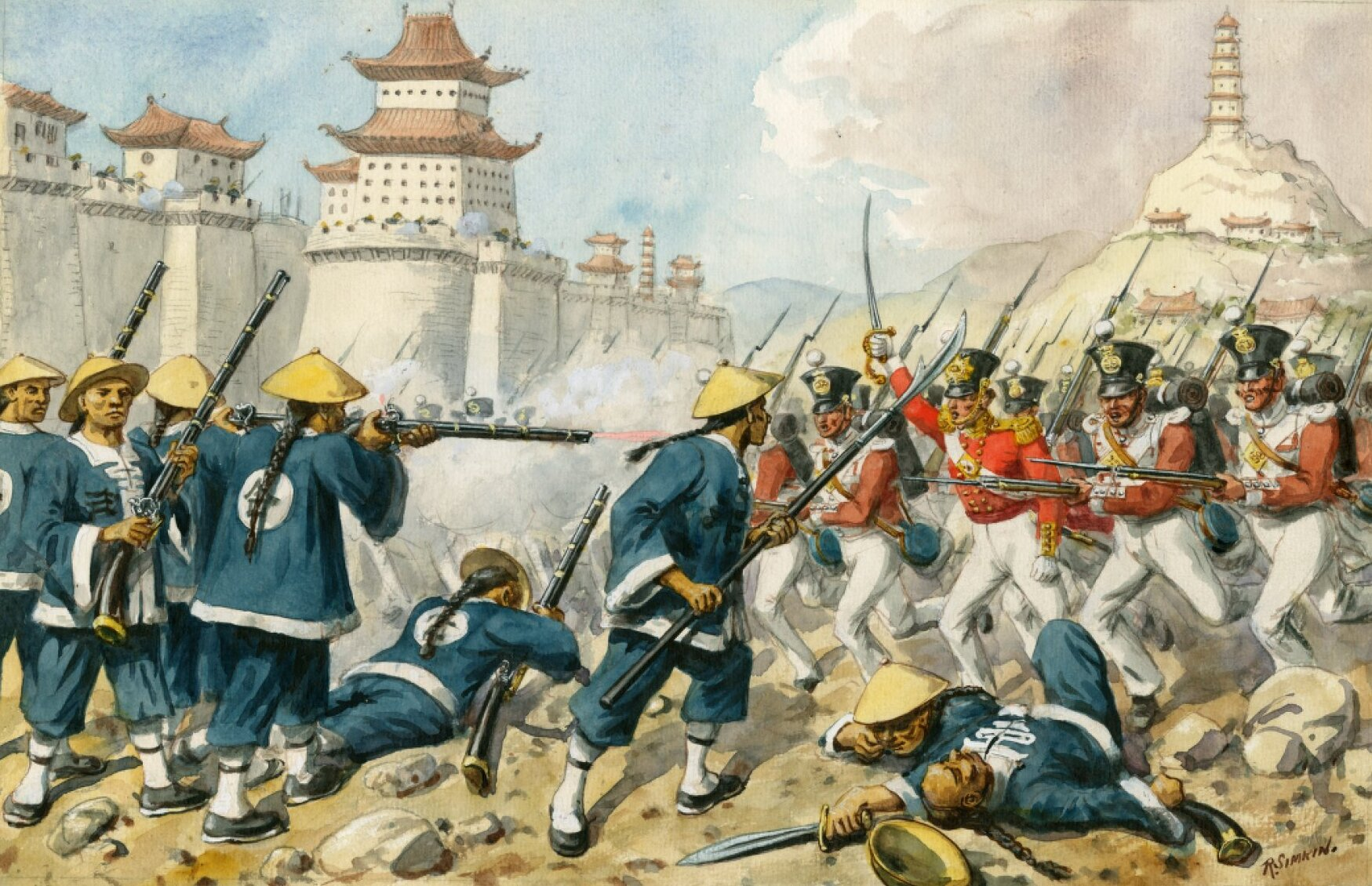
The regiment at the Battle of Chinkiang

In 1841 the regiment moved to Ireland but very shortly afterwards was sent to China during the First Opium War. Arriving in Hong Kong in 1842 it formed part of the 1st Brigade, commanded by Major General Lord Saltoun, along with the 26th Foot, the Bengal Volunteer Battalion and the grenadier and light companies of the 41st Madras Native Infantry. The brigade advanced on Chinkiang and after an ineffective pursuit of retreating Chinese forces took part in the final advance on Nanking. During this war very few battle casualties were taken but over 50 died from cholera with another over 200 unfit for duty. As a result of its participation in the war, the regiment was awarded its first battle honour "The DRAGON superscribed CHINA". A move to Hong Kong followed where the appalling death rate from disease continued with over 500 dying and sick. This loss of life affected the 98th's commander, Sir Colin Campbell; his biographer, Adrian Greenwood, argues that Campbell was suffering from manic depression at the time.

The next move was to India in 1846. Initially the regiment was based in Calcutta (Kolkata) and Dinapore, however, in 1848 it moved to the Punjab where, although not directly engaged in the Second Anglo-Sikh War, a second battle honour – PUNJAUB – was awarded. From here the regiment was one of the first British units to serve on the North West Frontier and spent 1849–1851 in and around the Kohat Pass area. The governor-general of India, had instructed Sir Colin Campbell to take the 98th on a series of punitive raids against Pathan tribesmen, in order to force them to pay taxes levied by the East India Company, but Campbell refused and was forced to resign and return to England.

By 1851 the regiment had been abroad for a total of nine years and in that time it had suffered over 1,100 deaths, mostly from sickness, with almost 200 invalided home. The last three years of the posting were spent in Calcutta before the regiment returned to England in 1855.

Following three years on home service the regiment returned to India and the North West Frontier. As a result, it saw no service in the Indian Mutiny. Instead it was employed as part of the Sittana Field Force sent to deal with the so-called Hindustani Fanatics.

The regiment returned home in 1867 and then in 1870 moved to Ireland for three years. During this time it dealt with minor disturbance including a mutiny by the Tipperary Light Infantry Militia. As part of the Cardwell Reforms of the 1870s, where single-battalion regiments were linked together to share a single depot and recruiting district in the United Kingdom, the 98th was linked with the 64th (2nd Staffordshire) Regiment of Foot, and assigned to district no. 20 at Whittington Barracks, Staffordshire.

The next posting was to the West Indies from 1873 to 1880 followed by a move to Malta. It was in Malta following the presentation of what transpired to be the last set of regimental colours by The Prince of Wales that the regiment became the 98th (Prince of Wales's) Regiment of Foot on 27 October 1876.

=== Amalgamation ===
War broke out in Afghanistan in 1879 and in 1880 in response the regiment moved once more to India being based initially at Karachi. It was here that in 1881 the eventual conclusion of the Childers Reforms took effect and the regiment amalgamated with the 64th Foot and with militia and rifle volunteer units in Northern Staffordshire to form the Prince of Wales's (North Staffordshire) Regiment. As the junior regiment the 98th Foot became the 2nd Battalion of the new regiment.

The regiment was renamed The North Staffordshire (The Prince of Wales's) Regiment in 1920. In 1959 the North Staffordshire and South Staffordshire Regiments amalgamated to form the Staffordshire Regiment (The Prince of Wales's). In September 2007 The Staffordshire Regiment amalgamated with the 22nd (Cheshire) Regiment and the Worcestershire and Sherwood Foresters Regiment to form the Mercian Regiment, in which the Staffords became the 3rd (Staffordshire) Battalion. The Dragon device is still carried on the colours and drums of the Mercian Regiment.

== Battle honours ==
The 98th Foot was granted the following battle honours:

- The DRAGON superscribed CHINA (1842);
- PUNJAUB (1848).

== Colonels of the Regiment ==
Colonels of the Regiment were:

- 1824–1829: Lt-Gen. Henry Conron
- 1829–1832: Lt-Gen. Sir Samuel Venables Hinde, KCB
- 1832–1836: Maj-Gen. Hon. Sir Charles John Greville, KCB
- 1836–1839: Lt-Gen. John Ross, CB
- 1839–1854: Gen. Sir Willoughby Cotton, GCB, KCH
- 1854–1863: Gen. William Lindsay Darling
- 1863–1864: Maj-Gen. Robert Henry Wynyard, CB
- 1864–1881: Gen. Sir Robert Percy Douglas, Bt.

== See also ==
- List of regiments of the British Army
- Staffordshire Regiment Museum

== Sources ==
- Cook, Hugh (1970). The North Staffordshire Regiment (The Prince of Wales's). Famous Regiments. London: Leo Cooper. ISBN 0-85052-056-8.
- An Historical Record of the 2nd Battalion, The Prince of Wales' North Staffordshire Regiment. Mooltan, Punjab, India: F Bremner. 1908.
- Greenwood, Adrian (2015). Victoria's Scottish Lion: The Life of Colin Campbell, Lord Clyde. History Press. ISBN 978-0-75095-685-7.
