= Henry Fane (1739–1802) =

British politician

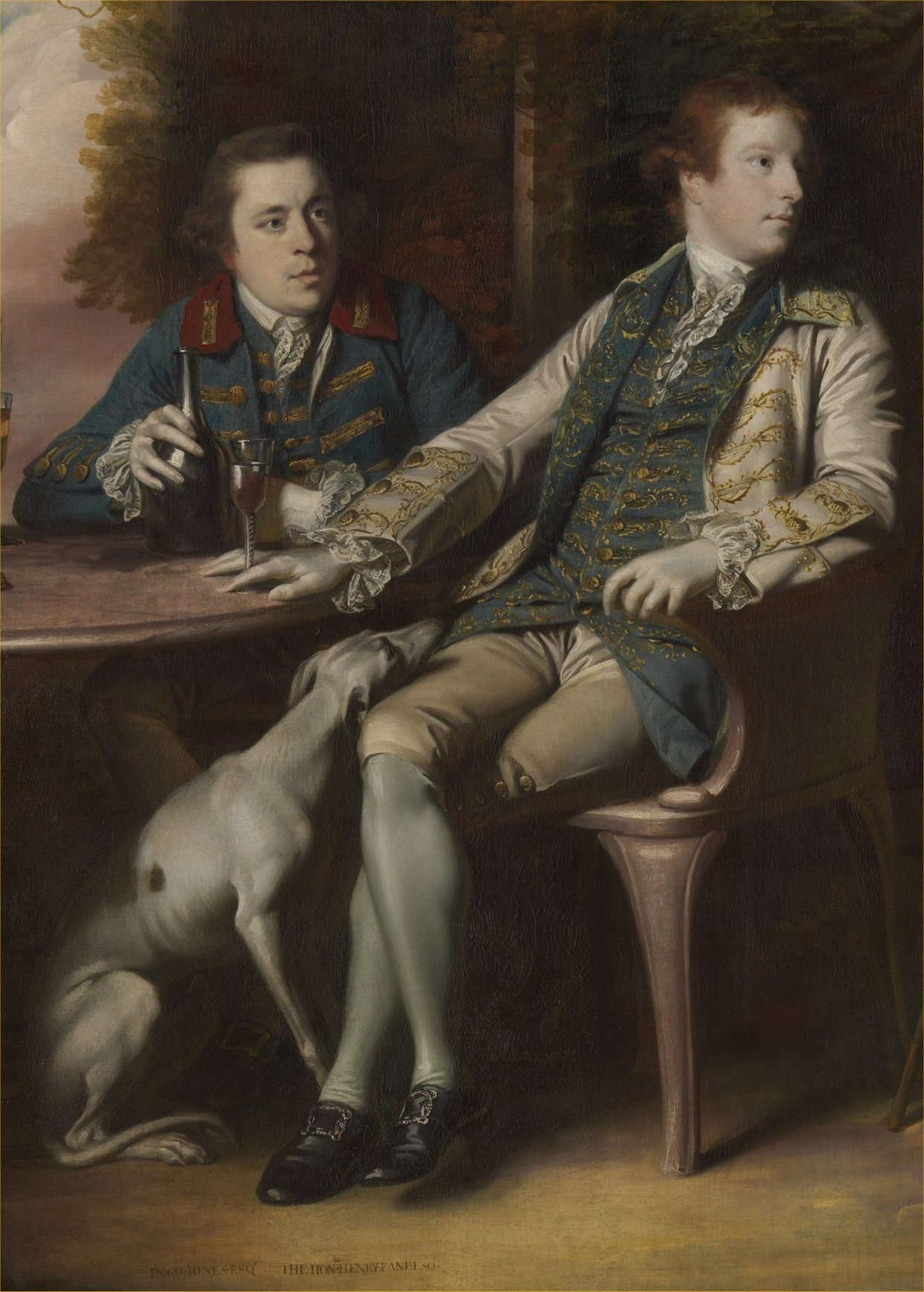
Inigo Jones (L, relative of famous architect) and Henry Fane (R)

Henry Fane (4 May 1739 – 4 June 1802) was a British politician who sat in the House of Commons for 30 years between 1772 and 1802.

== Early life ==
Fane was the younger son of Thomas Fane, 8th Earl of Westmorland, and his wife Elizabeth Swymmer, daughter of William Swymmer, a merchant of Bristol. He was a Clerk to HM Treasury from 7 December 1757 until 29 August 1763, but was described as "very idle and careless and spending much time in the country".

== Career ==
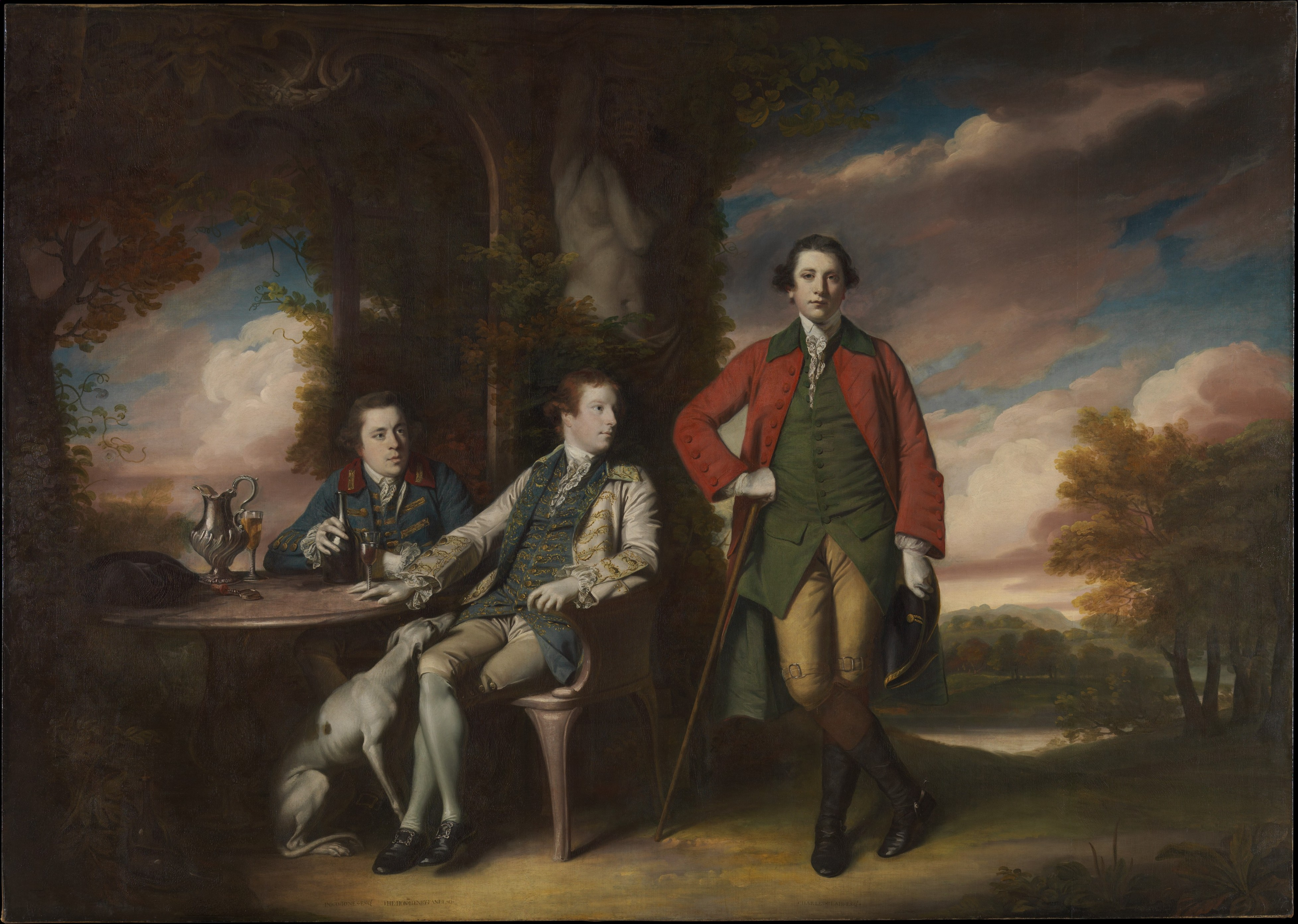
Fane with Inigo Jones and Charles Blair by Sir Joshua Reynolds 1761–66, at the Metropolitan Museum of Art

Fane followed a long line of Fanes as Members of Parliament for Lyme Regis the family's pocket borough, inherited from John Scrope which at times provided the Fanes with up to two members of parliament at the same time. Lord Burghersh succeeded in the peerage in 1772 and was elevated to the House of Lords. Fane was returned unopposed as Member of Parliament for Lyme Regis at the resulting by-election on 27 January 1772. In June 1772, he was appointed Keeper of the King's Private Roads, Gates and Bridges. He was returned for Lyme Regis again in 1774, 1780 and 1784. He was again returned in 1790 and 1796. His attendance was less regular in the last two parliaments. He did not stand at the 1802 general election. In all his time in parliament he never made a spoken contribution.

On 12 January 1778 Fane married Anne Buckley, the daughter of Edward Buckley Batson, a banker. Fane's father gave him Fulbeck Hall in 1783, which he and his wife occupied in 1784, and enlarged and refurnished, adding a new north wing. Fane died on 4 June 1802. Anne died on 19 January 1838.

== Children ==
The couple had 14 children:

- Gen. Sir Henry Fane MP (1778–1840)
- Anne Fane (19 January 1780 – March 1831), married Lt-Gen. John Michel and mother of Field Marshal Sir John Michel
- Lt-Col. Charles Fane (14 May 1781 – July 1813) Killed in action at Vittoria
- Elizabeth Fane (1782 – 28 January 1802)
- Rev. Edward Fane (7 December 1783 – 28 December 1862), married Maria Hodges; their children included Henry Hamlyn-Fane, Major-General Walter Fane and Colonel Francis Fane
- Vere Fane (5 January 1785 – 18 January 1863), MP
- Frances Mary Fane (d. 28 June 1787)
- Lt. Neville Fane, RN (16 January 1788 – 24 November 1807), died of yellow fever in Bridgetown
- William Fane (5 April 1789 – 7 March 1839), married Louisa Hay Dashwood and had issue
- Caroline Fane (28 December 1790 – 1859), married Charles Chaplin MP
- George Augustus Fane (16 March 1792 – 1 March 1795)
- Harriet Fane (1793–1834), married Charles Arbuthnot MP
- General Mildmay Fane (September 1794 – 12 March 1868)
- Robert George Cecil Fane (1796–1864)

Fane also had a natural child before his marriage:

- Sir Henry Chamberlain, 1st Baronet.

== Notes ==
Parliament of Great Britain
Preceded by Henry Fane; Lord Burghersh	Member of Parliament for Lyme Regis; 1772–1801; With: Henry Fane 1772–1777; Francis Fane 1777–1780; David Robert Michel 1780–1784; Thomas Fane 1784–1801	Succeeded by Parliament of the United Kingdom
Parliament of the United Kingdom
Preceded by Parliament of Great Britain	Member of Parliament for Lyme Regis; 1801–1802; With: Thomas Fane	Succeeded by Thomas Fane; Henry Fane
