= Julian Fane =

Julian Fane may refer to:

- Julian Fane (diplomat) (1827–1870), British diplomat and poet
- Julian Fane (author) (1927–2009), British author, kinsman of the above
- Julian Fane (musician), Canadian artist from Vancouver
