= Thomas Fane =

Thomas Fane may refer to:

- Thomas Fane (died 1607), MP for Dover
- Sir Thomas Fane (died 1589) (c. 1510–1589), Wyatt rebel, High Sheriff of Kent and MP
- Sir Thomas Fane (died 1692) (1626–1692), member of parliament for Maidstone
- Thomas Fane, 6th Earl of Westmorland (1681–1736), British peer
- Thomas Fane, 8th Earl of Westmorland (1701–1771), British MP for Lyme Regis and a lord commissioner of trade
- Thomas Fane (died 1807) (1760–1807), member of parliament for Lyme Regis
