= Fulbrook =

Fulbrook could be:

Places in England

- Fulbrook, Buckinghamshire
- Fulbrook, Oxfordshire
- Fulbrook, Warwickshire

Places in the United States

- Fulbrook, Texas

Other

- Fulbrook Middle School in Bedfordshire, England
- Fulbrook School in Surrey, England
