= 19th Lancers =

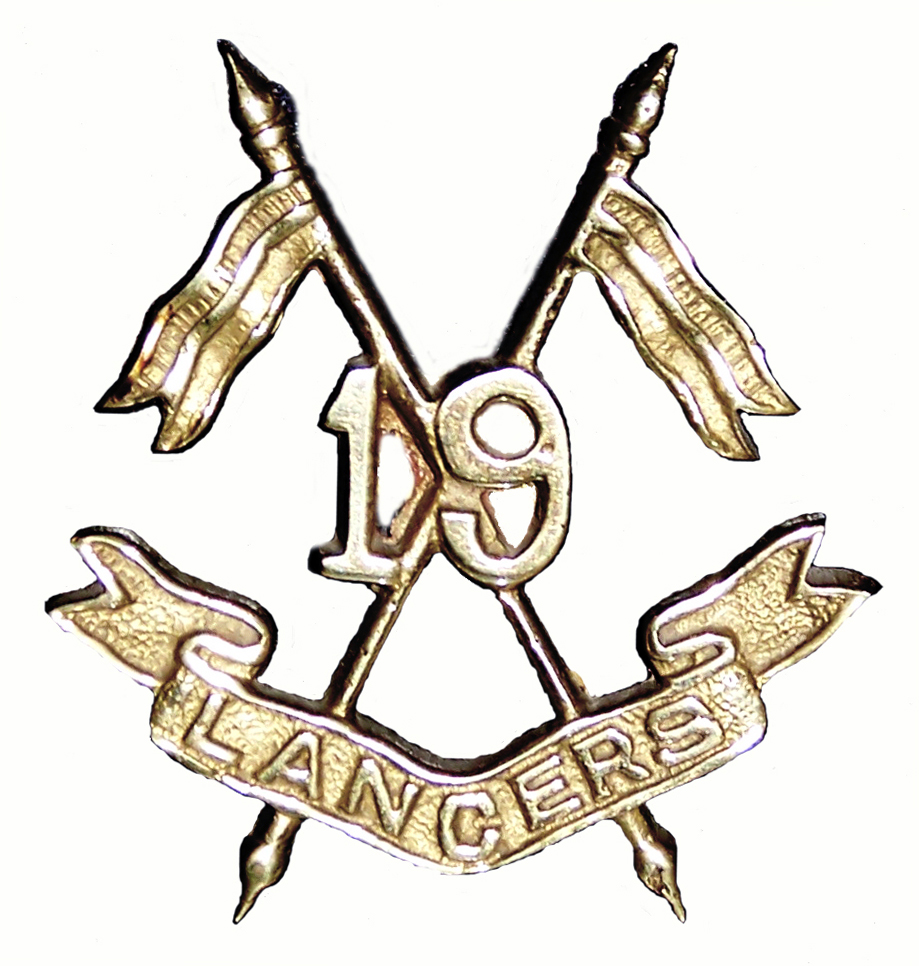
- Active: 1858 – Present
- Country: (British Raj) British India; Pakistan
- Allegiance: (United Kingdom) British Crown; Pakistan
- Branch: British Indian Army; Pakistan Army
- Type: Armoured Regiment
- Nickname: Tiwana Lancers
- Motto: Fane’s Horse
- Colors: Red Blue lavender
- Anniversaries: Jassoran Day (19 September)
- Engagements: Second Opium War 1860–62; Second Afghan War 1878–80; Tirah Campaign 1897; First World War 1914–18; Second World War 1939–45; Indo-Pakistan War 1965; Somalia 1993–95

Commanders
- Colonel-in-Chief: King George V
- Notable commanders: Charles Levinge Gregory, Hamid Gul

Insignia
- Colors of 19 Lancers

The 19th Lancers is an armoured regiment of the Pakistan Army. Before 1956, it was known as 19th King George V's Own Lancers, which was a regular cavalry regiment of the British Indian Army. It was formed in 1922, by the amalgamation of 18th King George's Own Lancers and 19th Lancers (Fane's Horse). On Partition of India in 1947, the regiment was allotted to Pakistan.

== 18th King George's Own Lancers ==
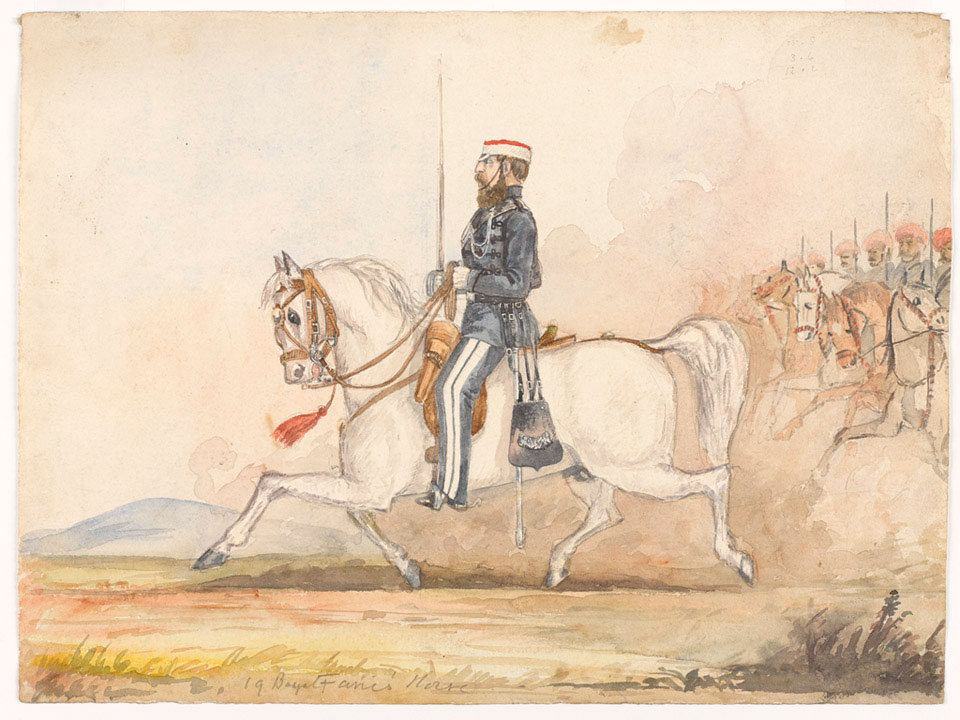
c. 1865 illustration of Fane's Horse

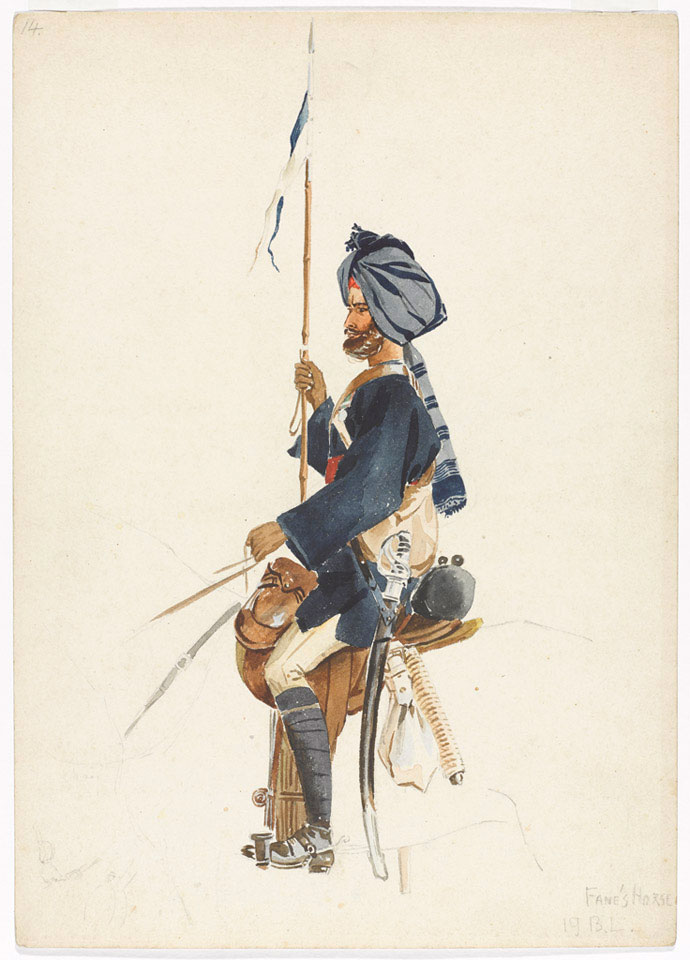
1890 illustration of a 19th Lancers trooper

The regiment was raised at Gwalior during the upheaval of the Indian Mutiny in 1858, as the 2nd Regiment of Mahratta Horse. In December, it was joined by a small body of independent cavalry of Punjabi Muslim Jats of the Tiwana clan. In 1861, it was redesignated as the 18th Regiment of Bengal Cavalry, becoming Lancers in 1886. The regiment served in the Second Afghan War during 1879–80 and took part in the 1897 Tirah Campaign on the North West Frontier of India.

During World War I, the regiment was sent to France in 1914 with the Indian Cavalry Corps and participated in the Battles of the Somme and Cambrai. In 1918, it moved to Egypt joining the 13th Cavalry Brigade and took part in General Edmund Allenby's campaign in Palestine. The regiment fought in the Battle of Megiddo and the subsequent dash towards Damascus – riding 550 miles in 38 days.

- 1861: 18th Regiment of Bengal Cavalry
- 1886: 18th Regiment of Bengal Lancers
- 1901: 18th Bengal Lancers
- 1906: 18th Prince of Wales's Own Tiwana Lancers
- 1910: 18th King George's Own Lancers

== 19th Lancers (Fane's Horse) ==
The regiment was raised as the Fane's Horse by Captain Walter Fane at Cawnpore in 1860 for service in the Second Opium War. In China, the regiment fought in several engagements including those at Sinho, Chan-chi-wan and Palikao. It then took part in the capture of Chinese capital of Beijing. In 1861, the regiment was redesignated as the 19th Regiment of Bengal Cavalry, becoming Lancers in 1864. It served in the Second Afghan War and fought in the Battle of Ahmad Khel in 1880. During World War I, the regiment served in France in the 2nd (Sialkot) Cavalry Brigade and participated in the Battles of the Somme and Cambrai. In 1918, it took part in the Palestinian Campaign and fought with distinction in the Battle of Megiddo.

- 1861: 19th Regiment of Bengal Cavalry
- 1864: 19th Regiment of Bengal Cavalry (Lancers)
- 1874: 19th Regiment of Bengal Lancers
- 1901: 19th Bengal Lancers
- 1903: 19th Lancers (Fane's Horse)

== 19th King George V's Own Lancers ==
The 18th King George's Own Lancers near Mametz during the Battle of the Somme, 15 July 1916

After the First World War, the number of Indian cavalry regiments was reduced from thirty-nine to twenty-one. However, instead of disbanding the surplus units, it was decided to amalgamate them in pairs. This resulted in renumbering and renaming of the entire cavalry line. The 18th King George's Own Lancers and 19th Lancers (Fane's Horse) were merged to form the 18th/19th Cavalry. In 1923, the regiment was redesignated as the 19th King George's Own Lancers, and in 1937 as 19th King George V's Own Lancers. Their uniform was scarlet with white facings and blue overalls. The badge consisted of crossed lances with the cypher of King George V at the intersection, a crown above, and the title scroll below. The new class composition of the regiment was one squadron each of Punjabi Muslims, Sikhs and Hindu Jats.

During the Second World War, the 19th KGVO Lancers was the divisional Reconnaissance Regiment of 25th Indian Infantry Division and fought in the Third Arakan Campaign in Burma. In November 1944, the 25th Indian Division cleared the Mayu Range down to Foul Point and occupied Akyab Island. These actions included the decisive Battle of Kangaw and landings at Myebon and Ru-Ywa to intercept the retreating Japanese. The regiment was actively engaged in these battles. In May, a squadron of 19th KGVO Lancers took part in the seaborne assault landing near Rangoon, which led to the capture of the Burmese capital. In April 1945 the 25th Indian Division was withdrawn to South India to prepare for the invasion of Malaya. Although Japan surrendered in August, the operation proceeded as planned and the 25th Division along with 19th KGVO Lancers was the first formation to land in Malaya. It then proceeded to occupy the capital Kuala Lumpur and accepted the surrender of the Japanese Army.

In 1947, with the partitioning of the British Indian empire and the creation of a separate state of Pakistan, the 19th King George V's Own Lancers was transferred to the Pakistan Army. The regiment exchanged its Jat squadron with the Central India Horse for its Punjabi Mussalman squadron, and gave its Sikh squadron to Skinner's Horse in return for its Mussalman squadron.

== 19th Lancers ==
In 1956, when Pakistan became a republic, all references to the British royalty were dropped and the regiment became simply the 19th Lancers. During the 1965 Indo-Pakistan War, the regiment had the unique distinction of serving in four theatres of war. Its Recce Troop served with 12 Division in Operation Grand Slam, while the rest of the regiment was deployed near Kasur as part of 1 Armoured Division. From Kasur, it was later sent to Lahore Sector and then finally to Chawinda as part of 6 Armoured Division. It was here, that 19th Lancers finally got a chance to go into action. The regiment saw heavy fighting and played an important role in blunting the Indian offensive.

In 1993–94, the regiment was deployed in Mogadishu, Somalia, as part of United Nations Peacekeeping Forces (UNOSOM II). The regiment's performance was highly commendable and it played a key role in rescuing the American Rangers, who were trapped by Somali gunmen after the disastrous American operation on 3 and 4 October 1993.

== Battle honours ==
Battle of Taku Forts (1860), Pekin 1860, Ahmad Khel, Afghanistan 1878–80, Tirah, Punjab Frontier, Somme 1916, Bazentin, Flers-Courcelette, Morval, Cambrai 1917, France and Flanders 1914–18, Megiddo, Sharon, Damascus, Palestine 1918, Buthidaung, Mayu Valley, Myebon, Kangaw, Ru-Ywa, Dalet, Tamandu, Rangoon Road, Burma 1942–45, Chawinda 1965, Lower Dir and Swat (2017-2019).

== Affiliations & Alliances ==
- (Pakistan) 7th Battalion The Frontier Force Regiment
- (United Kingdom) The Light Dragoons
- (United Kingdom) 2nd Battalion The Grenadier Guards
