= John Fane =

John Fane may refer to:

- John Fane, 7th Earl of Westmorland (1685–1762)
- John Fane, 9th Earl of Westmorland (1728–1774)
- John Fane, 10th Earl of Westmorland (1759–1841)
- John Fane, 11th Earl of Westmorland (1784–1859)
- John Fane (1751–1824), MP
- John Fane (1775–1850), MP, son of the above
- John Fane (1804–1875), MP, son of the above
