= Dorothy Fane =

Dorothy Fane may refer to:

- Dorothy Montagu, Countess of Sandwich (1716/7–1797), British aristocrat
- Dorothy Fane (actress) (1889–1976), British actress
