= Anthony Fane =

Anthony Fane may refer to:

- Anthony Fane, 13th Earl of Westmorland (1859–1922)
- Anthony Fane, 16th Earl of Westmorland (born 1951)
