= Harriet Arbuthnot =

English diarist (1793–1834)

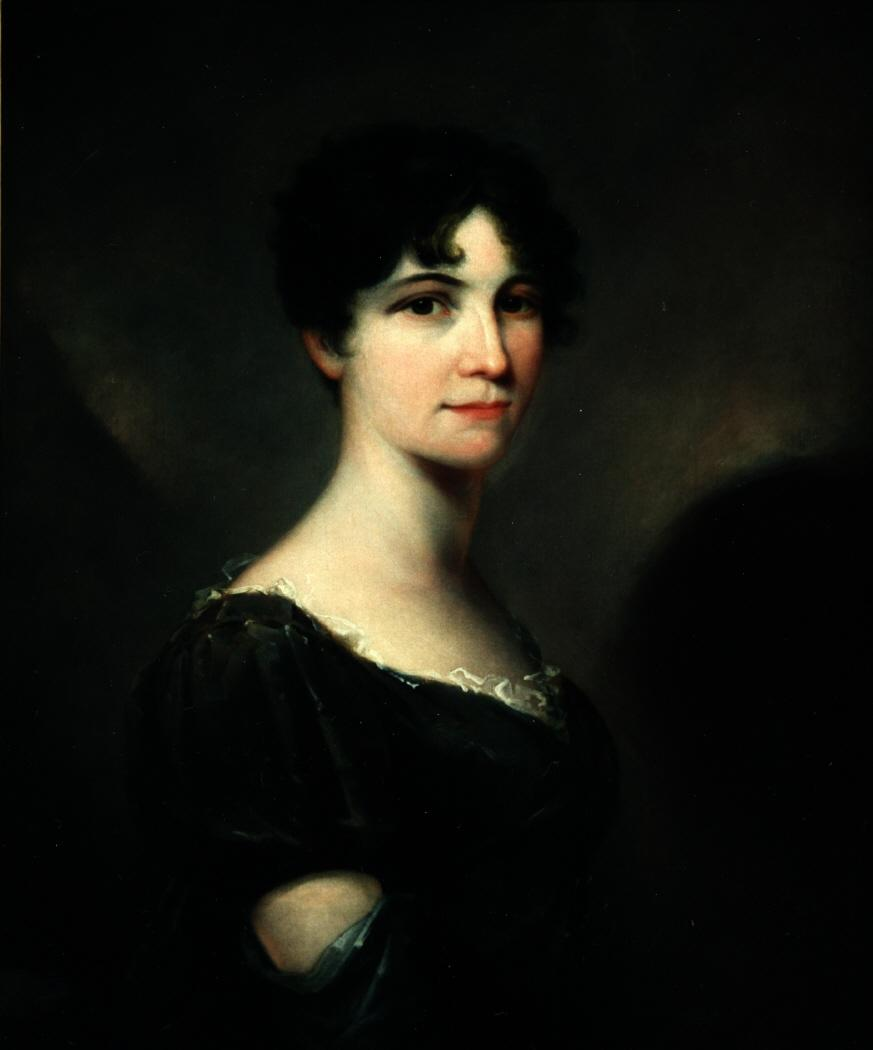
Portrait by John Hoppner, c. 1805

Harriet Arbuthnot (née Fane; 10 September 1793 – 2 August 1834) was an early 19th-century English diarist, social observer and political hostess on behalf of the Tory party. During the 1820s she was the closest woman friend of the hero of Waterloo and British Prime Minister, the 1st Duke of Wellington. She maintained a long correspondence and association with the Duke, all of which she recorded in her diaries, which are consequently extensively used in all authoritative biographies of the Duke of Wellington.

Born into the periphery of the British aristocracy, her parents were Henry Fane and his wife, Anne, née Batson; she married a politician and member of the establishment, Charles Arbuthnot. Thus well connected, she was perfectly placed to meet many of the key figures of the Regency and late Napoleonic eras. Recording meetings and conversations often verbatim, she has today become the "Mrs. Arbuthnot" quoted in many biographies and histories of the era. Her observations and memories of life within the British establishment are not confined to individuals but document politics, great events and daily life with an equal attention to detail, providing historians with a clear picture of the events described. Her diaries were themselves finally published in 1950 as The Journal of Mrs Arbuthnot.

== Early life ==
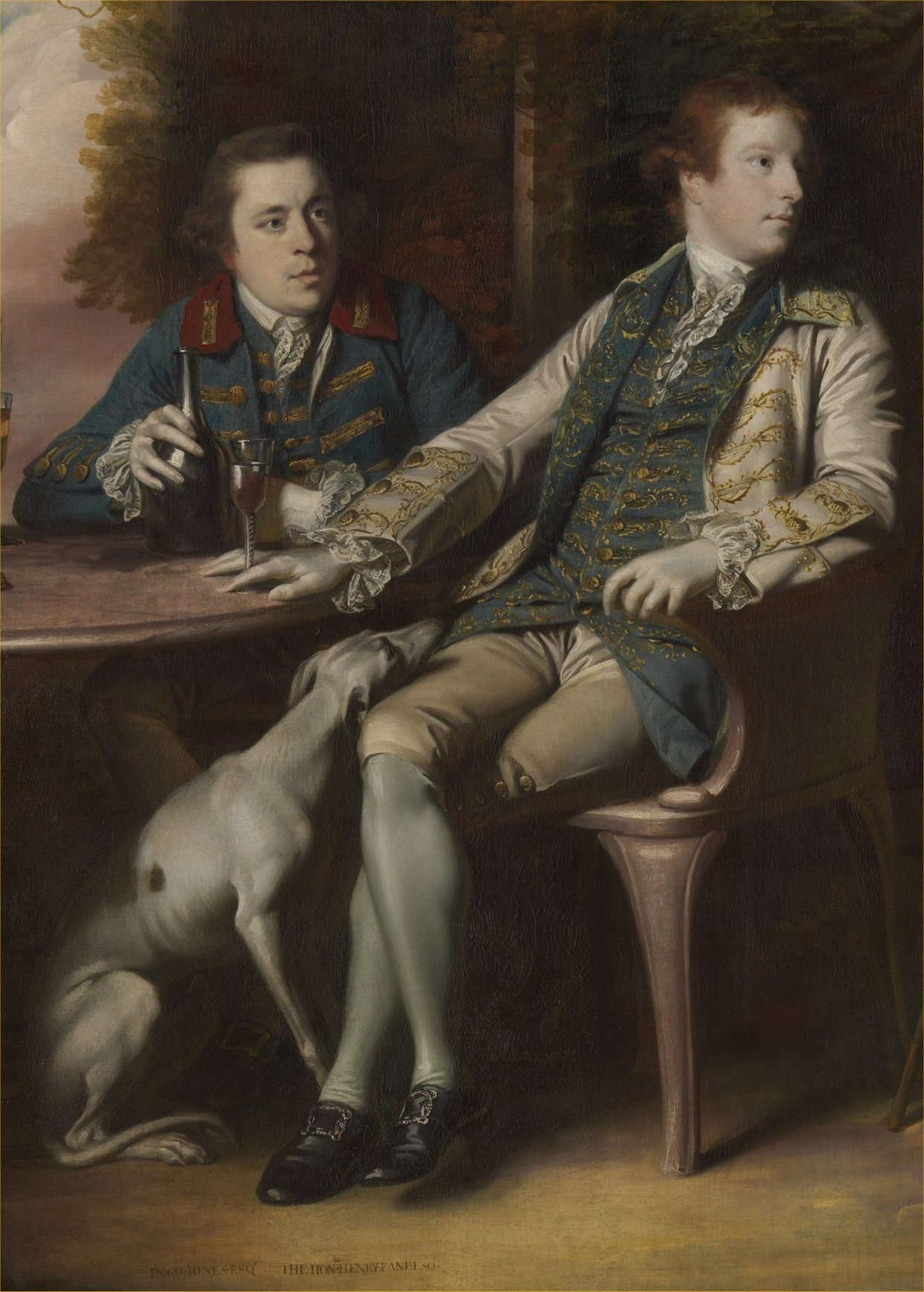
Hon. Henry Fane (right) MP (1739–1802), Harriet Arbuthnot's father

Harriet Arbuthnot was born Harriet Fane on 10 September 1793, the daughter of the Hon. Henry Fane, second son of Thomas Fane, 8th Earl of Westmorland. As a young man, Henry Fane had been described as "very idle and careless and spending much time in the country". However, he found time to be the Member of Parliament for Lyme and in 1772 was appointed Keeper of the King's Private Roads. In 1778, he married Arbuthnot's mother, Anne Batson, an heiress, the daughter of Edward Buckley Batson. The couple had 14 children: nine sons and five daughters.

The young Harriet spent much of her childhood at the family home at Fulbeck Hall in Lincolnshire, sited high on the limestone hills above Grantham. The house, which had been given to Henry Fane by his father, was a not over-large modern mansion at the time of Arbuthnot's childhood. It was rebuilt following a fire in 1733, and further extended and modernised in 1784 by Henry Fane.

Harriet Fane's father died when she was nine years old, on 4 June 1802, but the family fortunes improved considerably in 1810 when her mother inherited the Avon Tyrrell estate in Hampshire and the Upwood Estate in Dorset. This yielded the widowed Mrs Fane an income of £6,000 per annum (equivalent to £410,000 per year as of 2025).

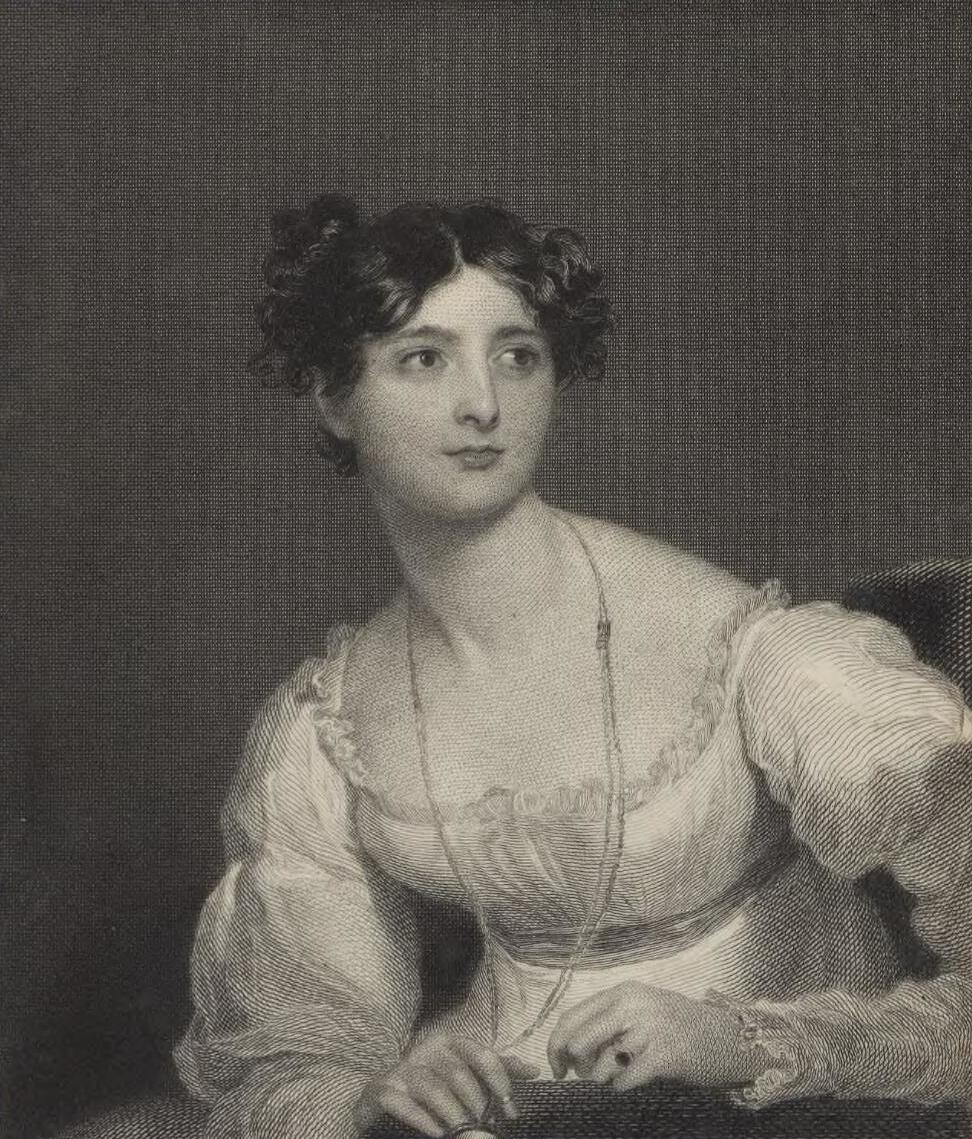
Portrait of Harriet Arbuthnot

== Marriage ==
Harriet Fane married Rt Hon Charles Arbuthnot, member of Parliament, at Fulbeck on 31 January 1814. Born in 1767, her husband was 26 years older than she was, an age difference which had initially caused her family to object to the marriage. She was 20. Another of the principal obstacles to finalising the arrangements for the marriage was financial. Her widowed mother delegated the arrangements for the marriage of her 20-year-old daughter to her elder son Vere, who was considered qualified in these matters as he worked at Child's Bank. It seems that Vere Fane and his mother were not initially prepared to settle enough money on his sister to satisfy her future husband, causing the prospective bridegroom to write to his fiancée: "How can you and I live upon £1000 or £1200 and Fane [her mother] finds it so impossible to live upon her £6000 that she can offer you no assistance whatsoever?"

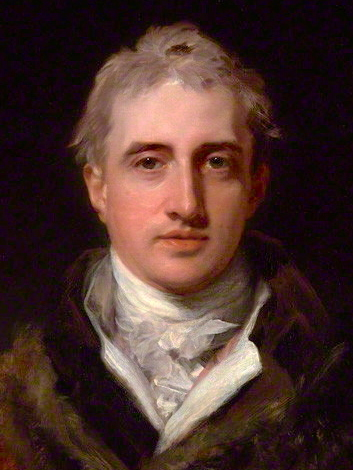
Lord Castlereagh, Harriet Arbuthnot's "dearest and best friend."

Charles Arbuthnot was a widower with four children; his son Charles was a mere nine years junior to his new wife. His first wife Marcia, a lady in waiting to the notorious Princess of Wales, had died in 1806. Like the other two men his second wife so admired, Viscount Castlereagh and Wellington, Charles Arbuthnot was a member of the Anglo-Irish aristocracy. He had been a member of parliament since 1795, when he became the member for East Looe. At the time of his marriage to Fane, he was the member for St Germans. He had briefly interrupted his political career to become Ambassador Extraordinary to the Ottoman Empire between 1804 and 1807. Marriage to such a pillar of the establishment as Charles Arbuthnot opened all doors to his young new wife, who, as one of the 14 children of a younger son of an aristocratic family possessed of no great fortune, would otherwise have been on the periphery of the highest society. However, as the debate and wrangling over her dowry proved, money was tight.

Throughout her marriage, Mrs Arbuthnot, the former Harriet Fane, formed close friendships with powerful older men. She described Castlereagh as her "dearest and best friend" until his death in 1822, when she transferred her affections to the other great 19th-century Anglo-Irish peer, the Duke of Wellington. All social commentators of the time, however, agree that her marriage was happy; indeed, her husband was as close a friend of Wellington's as was his wife. Married to a politician, she was fascinated by politics and enjoyed success as a political hostess while exerting her energies to promote Tory causes. However, while she was the dominant partner, her conservative outlook ensured her continued favour among her elderly Tory admirers. During the early part of her marriage, her husband served as an Under-Secretary at the Treasury. Later, in 1823, he was given the Department of Woods and Forests, a position which gave him charge of the Royal parks and gardens. The subsequent access to the Royal family this allowed increased not only his status but also that of his wife.

When remarking in her diaries on other women who shared their affections with great men of the day, Arbuthnot displayed a sharp, ironic wit. Of Wellington's one-time mistress Princess Dorothea Lieven, wife to the Imperial Russian ambassador to London from 1812 to 1834, she wrote "It is curious that the loves and intrigues of a femme galante should have such influence over the affairs of Europe."

Her political observations are clearly written from her own Tory viewpoint. However, her detailed description of the rivalry for power between the Tories and Liberals which took place between 1822 and 1830 is one of the most authoritative accounts of this struggle.

== Relationship with Wellington ==
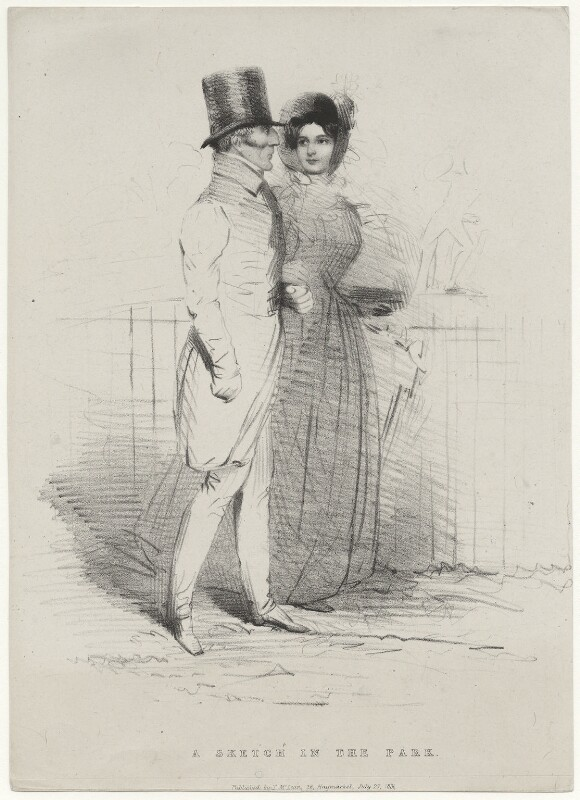
Harriet Arbuthnot was the Duke of Wellington's "closest woman friend."

It is likely that Arbuthnot first came to the attention of Wellington during 1814 in the re-opened salons of Paris following the exile of Napoleon to Elba. Wellington had been appointed the British Ambassador to the Court of the Tuileries, and the city was crowded with English visitors anxious to travel on the continent and socialise after the Napoleonic Wars.

Amongst those sampling the rounds of entertainment in this lively environment were the newly married Arbuthnots. Charles Arbuthnot was known to Wellington, as he had been a strong supporter of Wellington's younger brother Henry during his divorce, and it is possible Wellington had met, or at least heard of, Mrs Arbuthnot—she was a first cousin to his favourites the Burghersh family. However, it was only after the death of Castlereagh in 1822 that the Wellington–Arbuthnot friendship blossomed. It is unlikely any close friendship developed before this time. Wellington, ensconced in the Hotel de Charost (recently vacated by Napoleon's sister Princess Pauline Borghese) and fêted by the whole of Restoration Paris, had already found himself a close female companion, Giuseppina Grassini. This woman, known, due to her close friendship with Napoleon as "La Chanteuse de l'Empereur", scandalised Parisian society both English and French by appearing on Wellington's arm, especially after the arrival in Paris of the Duchess of Wellington.

The story of a "ménage à trois" between Mrs Arbuthnot, her husband Charles, and Wellington, widely speculated upon, has been rejected by some biographers. However, it has been said that the unhappily married Duke enjoyed his relationship with Mrs Arbuthnot because he found in her company "the comfort and happiness his wife could not give him." Arbuthnot was certainly the Duke's confidante in all matters, especially that of his marriage. He confided to her that he only married his wife because "they asked me to do it" and that he was "not the least in love with her." In fact, Wellington had not seen his wife for ten years before their wedding day. Following the marriage, the bride and groom found they had little if anything in common. Despite producing two sons, they led mostly separate lives until the death of the Duchess of Wellington in 1831. Harriet had a rather poor opinion of the Duchess ("she is such a fool"), although she disagreed with Wellington when he said that his wife cared nothing for his comfort: in Harriet's view the Duchess longed to make her husband happy, but had no idea how to go about the task.

As a consequence of his unsatisfactory marriage, Wellington formed relationships with other women, but it was for Arbuthnot that "he reserved his deepest affection." Her husband at this time was working at The Treasury and Arbuthnot in effect became what would today be termed Wellington's social secretary during his first term of premiership between January 1828 and November 1830. It has been suggested that the Duke of Wellington allowed her "almost unrestricted access to the secrets of the cabinet". Whatever her knowledge and access, however, it appears she was unable to influence the Duke, but even his refusal to bring her husband into the Cabinet in January 1828 failed to shake the intimacy of the trio.

Wellington made no attempts to conceal his friendship with Arbuthnot. An indication that their relationship was platonic and accepted as such in the highest echelons of society can be drawn from the Duchess of Kent permitting Wellington to present Arbuthnot to her infant daughter, the future Queen Victoria, in 1828. Arbuthnot noted that the young princess was "the most charming child I ever saw" and that "the Duchess of Kent is a very sensible person, who educates her (Victoria) remarkably well." Arbuthnot's impressions of the Duchess were less than candid, and not shared by Wellington and other establishment figures. However, had Arbuthnot's own character not been judged respectable an audience with the infant princess would not have been permitted.

Many references in Arbuthnot's diary, however, are less respectful than those she accorded to the Duchess of Kent. Wellington and Arbuthnot often travelled together, and a visit to Blenheim Palace they shared in 1824 provoked a scathing entry in her journal concerning Wellington's fellow duke the 5th Duke of Marlborough, of whom she wrote: "The family of the great General is, however, gone sadly to decay, and are but a disgrace to the illustrious name of Churchill, which they have chosen this moment to resume. The present Duke is overloaded with debt, is very little better than a common swindler".

When Wellington and the Tories fell from power in November 1830, Arbuthnot lost interest in her diary, writing: "I shall write very seldom now, I dare say, in my book, for, except the Duke, none of the public men interest me." Her account of the break-up of the Tory party is a thoroughly partisan narration, accurate as to happenings outside the Tory inner circle, but on a broader scale and not so completely political as that of Henry Hobhouse.

== Death and legacy ==
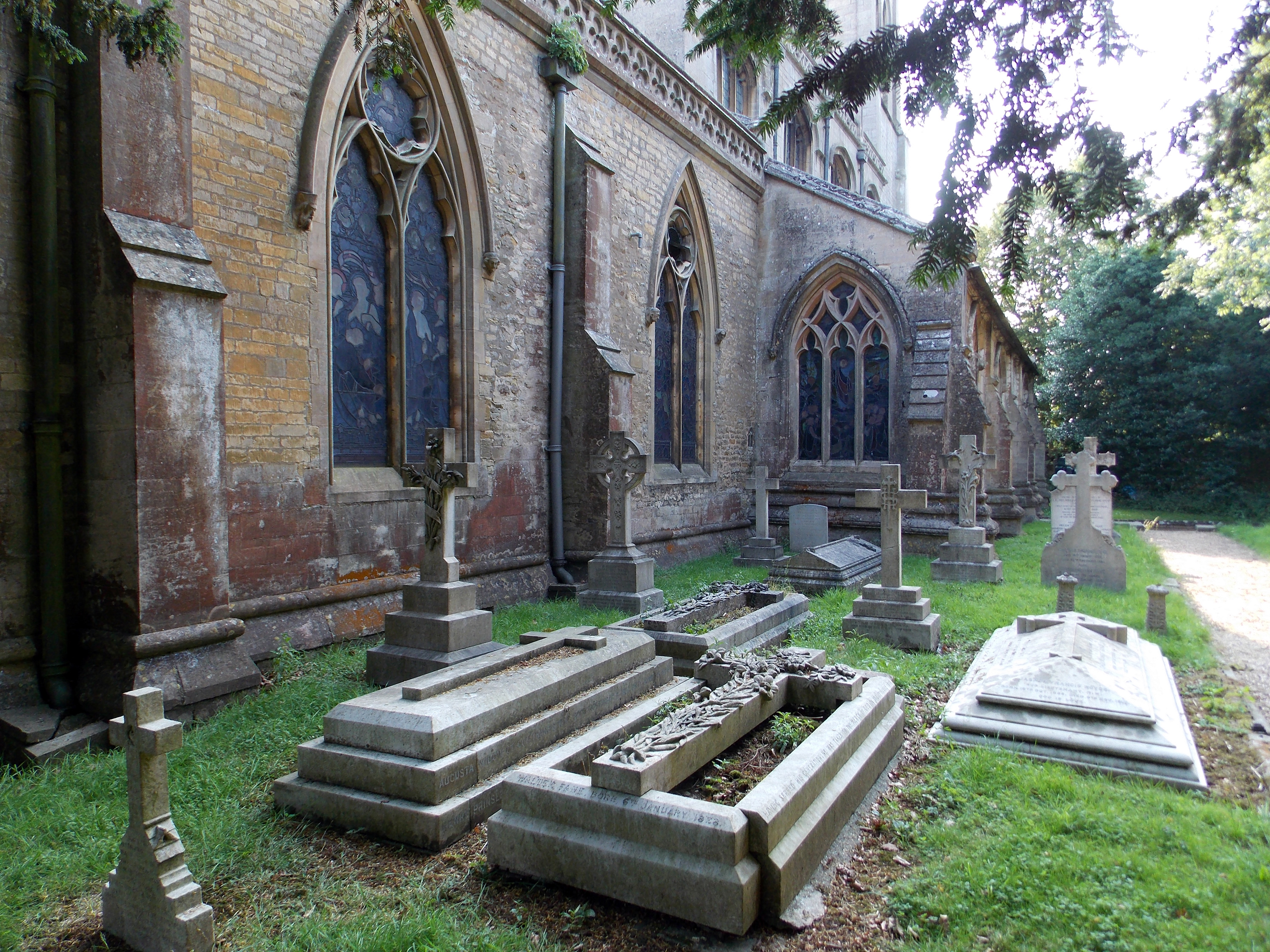
The Fane family plot, at Fulbeck, where Harriet Arbuthnot is buried.

Arbuthnot died suddenly of cholera on 2 August 1834, age 40, at Woodford Lodge, her home near the Arbuthnots' seat, Woodford House, Northamptonshire. Immediately after her death an express message was sent to Apsley House, Wellington's London house. The messenger, however, had to divert to Hatfield House, where Wellington was dining with the Marquess and Marchioness of Salisbury. After Arbuthnot's death, it was revealed she had been on a civil list pension of £936 per annum (£96,000 per year as of 2025) since January 1823, for 11 years. After her death, her husband, Charles, left Woodford House and lived with his close friend Wellington in Apsley House. He died there in 1850, aged 83.

Arbuthnot was buried in the Fane family plot at St Nicholas' parish church, Fulbeck. She is one of a number of notable women with a connection to Grantham honoured by South Kesteven District Council in 2023.

== See also ==
- List of diarists
