= Charles George Fane =

Royal Navy Admiral (1837–1909)

Admiral Sir Charles George Fane KCB FZS
- Born: 13 November 1837; Simla, India
- Died: 23 February 1909 (aged 71); Aberdeen
- Military career
- Allegiance: United Kingdom
- Branch: Royal Navy
- Service years: 1851–1902
- Rank: Admiral
- Commands: HMS Hector; Captain-Superintendent Sheerness Dockyard (1888–90); Admiral Superintendent Portsmouth (1892–96)
- Conflicts: Crimean War
- Awards: Knight Commander of the Order of the Bath

Admiral Sir Charles George Fane KCB FZS (13 November 1837 – 23 February 1909) was a British Royal Navy officer who was Admiral superintendent at HM Dockyard Portsmouth.

== Biography ==
Fane was born in 1837, the son of Colonel Fane, of Fulbeck, Hall, Lincolnshire. He entered the Royal Navy in 1851, and served as a midshipman in the Black Sea during the Crimean War.

He was promoted to Lieutenant in 1859, and served as 1st Lieutenant on the frigate HMS Galatea while it was commanded by the then Duke of Edinburgh. Promotion to Commander followed on 16 October 1868, and to Captain on 9 August 1875. From 1882 to 1884 he was senior officer on the Newfoundland Fishery Station, and in 1886 he was appointed in command of the battleship HMS Hector, which was part of the Channel Fleet. In 1888 he was appointed Captain-Superintendent of Sheerness Dockyard and an Aide-de-camp to Queen Victoria, serving as such until 5 August 1890, when he was promoted to flag rank as Rear admiral. He was Admiral-Superintendent of HM Dockyard Portsmouth from February 1892 to February 1896, and was promoted to Vice admiral on 9 November 1896. Throughout his career he served as Chairman of several Admiralty committees.

He was appointed a Knight Commander (military) of the Order of the Bath (KCB) in the November 1901 Birthday Honours list, and invested by King Edward VII on 17 December 1901.

Fane was promoted to Admiral 24 January 1902, and retired from the navy later that month. In retirement he lived at his seat in Aberdeenshire, of which county he was a Justice of the peace.

He was elected a Fellow of the Zoological Society of London (FZS) in February 1869.

Fane died in Aberdeen on 23 February 1909, after an operation.

== Family ==
Fane married in 1875, Mary-Ann Kenny, youngest daughter of Sir Edward Kenny, Canadian Senator from Nova Scotia.
