= Francis Fane (soldier) =

Francis Augustus Fane (1824–1894) was an English officer in the British Army, who raised the Peshawar Light Horse during the Indian Mutiny. Fane was also a noted traveller, diarist, artist as well as in later years a successful banker.

== Early life ==
Fane was born in 1824 into the prosperous Fane family in Fulbeck Lincolnshire. Fourth son of the Reverend Edward Fane of Fulbeck Hall and Maria Hodges. His younger brothers include Henry Hamlyn-Fane and General Walter Fane.

== Military service ==
Francis joined the 25th Regiment of Foot on 27 August 1841 in which he served in Gibraltar (1858-1863); Malta (1863-1864); and Canada (1865-1866). When the Indian mutiny broke out in 1857-1859, Francis Fane raised the Peshawar Light Horse to fight against the mutineers. He campaigned throughout the Mutiny with a church organ with which he roused both troops and civilians alike.

Fane was promoted to the rank of Lieutenant Colonel on 23 October 1860.

== Later life ==
In 1862 his father died and Francis Fane inherited the Fulbeck Hall estate in Lincolnshire. Fane left the army ranked a Colonel and became a successful Banker as a partner in Praed Fane and Co., based in Nottingham. Fane was a keen musician, artist and engraver as well as diarist.

Fane died in 1894. He is buried in Fulbeck, St Nicholas Churchyard. The inscription on his grave reads: "THIS GATE IN THE CHURCH-YARD OF HIS NATIVE VILLAGE IS DEDICATED BY HIS FAMILY TO THE MEMORY OF COL FRANCIS AUGUSTUS FANE 1894"

=== Family ===
Francis Fane married Augusta Fane (born 3 November 1831) in 1863.
