= Francis Fane of Fulbeck =

Francis Fane of Fulbeck has been used to identify these men:

- Sir Francis Fane (Royalist) (c. 1611–1681?), was the third, but second surviving, son of Francis Fane, 1st Earl of Westmorland
- Sir Francis Fane (dramatist) (d. 1689?), was the son of Frances Fulbeck (royalist) and grandson of Francis Fane, 1st Earl of Westmorland.
