= Mark Sutton Vane =

Mark Sutton Vane is an English architectural lighting designer.

Sutton Vane was born in London, England, and studied architecture at the University of Westminster. He then started work at the Laserium in the London Planetarium. Here he used a visual synthesiser to perform laser light shows to music. He created new shows for musicians such as Kate Bush and Jean Michel Jarre.

In 1989, Sutton Vane moved into architectural lighting design. He worked for two lighting design practices before starting Sutton Vane Associates in 1995, working on churches, cathedrals, retail environments, commercial projects, leisure attractions, events, offices and hotels around the world. Sutton Vane wrote the lighting strategy for the Park and Public Realm Aspects of the 2012 Olympics, and regeneration schemes in Portsmouth and Liverpool. The practice lit HMS Victory, National Museum of Ireland, National Museum of Saudi Arabia, “The First Emperor - China’s Terracotta Army” at the British Museum, The Roundhouse, The National Museum of Oman, The Painted Hall in Greenwich and Sheffield’s Sheaf Square. In 2021, Sutton Vane re-wrote the Society of Light and Lighting (SLL) Lighting Guide 8: Lighting for Museums and Galleries.

Examples of the practice's emphasis on sustainable lighting include its scheme for the Museum of Country Life in Ireland. Sutton Vane was the lighting consultant for the London Eye and in 2001 lit St Paul's Cathedral in red light for World Aids Day, featured on the front cover of The Lit Environment by Derek Philips.

Light magazine ranked Sutton Vane Associates as one of the top 10 UK architectural lighting consultancies and ranked both Portsmouth and Liverpool in its top 10 best-lit cities.

Mark Sutton Vane is a grandson of Sutton Vane, the noted playwright.
