= Vere Fane (MP) =

English politician

Member of Parliament for Lyme Regis
- In office 1818–1826 Serving with John Thomas Fane
- Succeeded by: Henry Sutton Fane

Personal details
- Born: 5 January 1785
- Died: 18 January 1863 (aged 78)
- Parent: Henry Fane (father)

Vere Fane (5 January 1785 – 18 January 1863) was an English politician in the 19th century. He was Tory Member of Parliament for Lyme Regis from 1818 to 1826.
