= Mildmay Fane (British Army officer) =

British Army officer

General Mildmay Fane
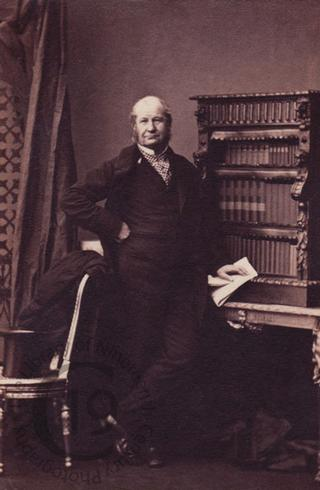
- Born: 3 February 1795
- Died: 12 March 1868 (aged 73)
- Military career
- Allegiance: United Kingdom
- Branch: British Army
- Service years: 1812–1868
- Rank: General
- Commands: 54th Regiment of Foot
- Conflicts: Napoleonic Wars; Peninsular War; Siege of Cádiz; Battle of Vitoria; Siege of San Sebastián; Battle of the Nive; Hundred Days; Battle of Quatre Bras (WIA); Battle of Waterloo
- Awards: Military General Service Medal

General Mildmay Fane (3 February 1795 – 12 March 1868) was a British Army officer.

== Military career ==
Born the son of Henry Fane and Anne Fane (née Batson) as well as the grandson of Thomas Fane, 8th Earl of Westmorland, Fane fought at the Battle of Vitoria, the Battle of San Sebastian and the Battle of the Nive during the Peninsular War as well as the Battle of Quatre Bras during the Hundred Days. He raised the 98th (Prince of Wales's) Regiment of Foot in Chichester in response to the threat posed by the French intervention in Spain in March 1824.

He was promoted to full general on 27 March 1863.

== Sources ==
- Cook, Hugh (1970). The North Staffordshire Regiment (The Prince of Wales's). Famous Regiments. London: Leo Cooper. ISBN 0-85052-056-8.
