= Walter Fane =

British Indian Army officer (1828-1885)

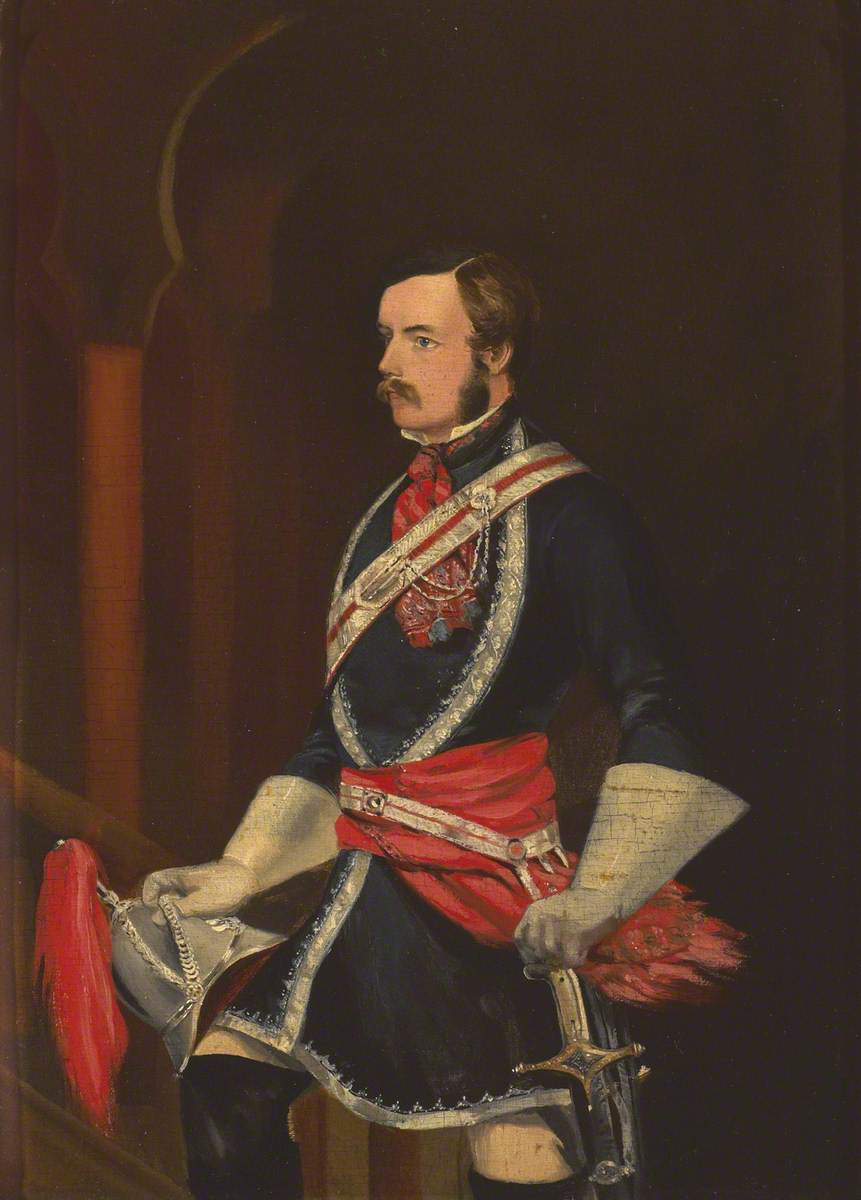
- Walter Fane, as a Lieutenant, ca. 1860
- Born: 1828
- Died: 1885 (aged 56–57)
- Military career
- Allegiance: United Kingdom
- Branch: British Indian Army
- Rank: Major general
- Commands: Fane's Horse
- Conflicts: Indian Rebellion; Second Opium War
- Awards: Companion of the Order of the Bath

Major-General Walter Fane CB (1828–1885) was a British Indian Army officer who served in Central India on the North West Frontier as well as in China during the Opium Wars. Fane raised a troop of irregular cavalry to fight in China made up of Indian volunteers and they went on to become Fane's Horse, a regiment that remains part of Pakistan's armed forces.

== Life ==
Walter Fane, a member of the Fane family, was born in 1828 in Fulbeck Lincolnshire. He was the son of the Rev. Edward Fane of Fulbeck Hall.

== Army career ==
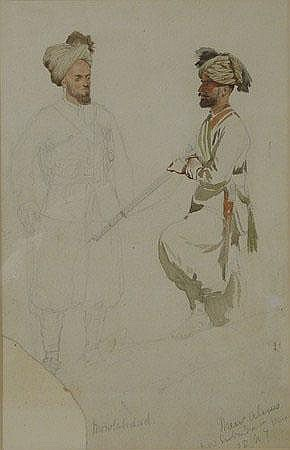
Pencil study of two Indian soldiers

He entered the army in 1845 and became a lieutenant in 1853. He served in the Punjab Irregular Cavalry on the North West frontier where they fought a number of engagements against the hill tribes.

During the Indian Rebellion Fane fought against Tantya Tope and he was present when the Indian rebel leader was captured and executed.

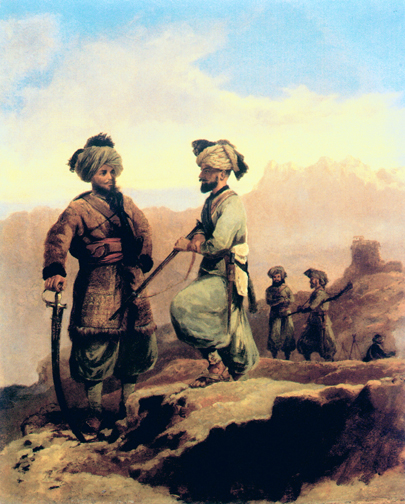
20th (Punjab) Regiment of Bengal Native Infantry, by Walter Fane

In 1860 Fane raised the irregular cavalry force of Fane's Horse to fight in China during the Second Opium War. Fane's horse fought in the engagements of Sinho, Chinkiawbaw, Pulli-chi-on as well as in the sacking of Peking under Fane's cousin Field Marshal Sir John Michel. For these services he was nominated as a Companion of the Order of the Bath.

== Later life ==
Fane was also an artist and had limited success throughout his lifetime, and he was the most successful member of a moderately artistic family. He married but had no children and he died aged 58 in Fulbeck, where is buried.
