= Baron Bergavenny =

Barony in the Peerage of Great Britain

The title Baron Bergavenny (or Abergavenny) was created several times in the Peerage of England and once in the Peerage of Great Britain, all but the first being baronies created by error. Abergavenny is a market town in Monmouthshire with a castle established by the Norman lord Hamelin de Balun c. 1087.

The feudal barony of Abergavenny came into existence shortly after the Norman Conquest of 1066. The barony by writ was first created in 1392 for Sir William de Beauchamp, a younger son of the 11th Earl of Warwick. This creation passed to his son, who succeeded as 2nd Baron, and who was subsequently created Earl of Worcester. On his death, the Earldom of Worcester became extinct, but the Barony passed to his daughter, who by modern doctrine succeeded as 3rd Baroness. She died in 1447 when the Barony descended to her son, who succeeded as 4th Baron.

In 1450, Sir Edward Nevill, widower of the 3rd Baroness, was summoned to Parliament as Lord Bergavenny. It has been assumed that this summons was intended to be in the right of his wife, but as she was already dead and the Barony was already vested in her son by Nevill, by modern doctrine this served to create a new Barony by writ. This second creation merged with the first creation in 1476, when the 1st Baron (of the second creation) died and his son, the aforementioned 4th Baron of the first creation, also became 2nd Baron of the second creation.

In 1587, on the death of the 6th Baron (of the first creation) and 4th Baron (of the second creation), by modern doctrine both Baronies descended to his daughter, Mary, Lady Fane, wife of Sir Thomas Fane, who thus became de jure 7th and 5th Baroness. The title (for it was believed at the time only to be one Barony) was claimed by Edward Nevill, the heir male of the 4th and 2nd Baron, and in 1604 he was summoned to Parliament as Lord Bergavenny. As he was not entitled to either of the existing Baronies, this served to create a further Barony by Writ. By modern doctrine, the first and second creations descended to the Earls of Westmorland, heirs of the 7th and 5th Baroness, until both became abeyant on the death of the 7th Earl (and 14th and 12th Baron) in 1762.

The wrongful assumption that the Barony descended to heirs male continued, and this pattern (heirs general being deprived of their rightful title and heirs male being summoned to Parliament, with a new title being created in the process) was repeated several times, resulting in the fourth to seventh creations. The fourth and fifth creations became extinct on the death of the first holder of each, who both died without heirs, and the sixth became abeyant in 1811. The provenance of the third creation is unclear. None of these new creations were recognised as such at the time.

The last creation, and the only one in the Peerage of Great Britain, came in 1724, in favour of William Nevill. His son, who succeeded as 2nd Baron, was created Earl of Abergavenny in 1784, and the 5th Earl was created Marquess of Abergavenny in the Peerage of the United Kingdom in 1876. The Barony descended with the Earldom and then also the Marquessate (both of which were limited to heirs male) until 1938 when the 3rd Marquess died leaving no surviving sons but two surviving daughters, whereupon the Barony fell into abeyance between them. By the principle of moiety title, the heirs of those daughters – the 6th Marquess Camden and the 23rd Baron Hastings – are the co-heirs to one half of the Barony each, and neither has petitioned for the title to be settled upon one or the other (cf. Baron Arlington).

== Feudal Barons of Abergavenny ==
Dates below are the dates when they possessed Abergavenny.

- Hamelin de Balun (tempore William I)
- Brientius de Insula (d. c. 1147)
- Miles de Gloucester (died 1143) (temp Henry I)
- Roger Fitzmiles, 2nd Earl of Hereford 1143–1155
- Walter de Hereford 1155–1160?
- Henry FitzMiles 1160?–1163?
- Mahel de Hereford 1163?–1164?
- William de Hereford 1164?–1165
- Hugh de Beauchamp
- William de Braose 1173–aft. 1179
- William de Braose (tempore King John of England)
- Giles de Braose 1215
- Reginald de Braose 1216–1228
- William V de Braose 1228–1230 ("Black William")
- William III de Cantilupe, (died 1254), jure uxoris, who married Eva de Braose (d.1255), daughter and heiress of William V de Braose.
- Sir George de Cantilupe 1255–1273 (son)
- John Hastings, 1st Baron Hastings (1273–1313 (nephew)
- John Hastings, 2nd Baron Hastings 1313–1325
- Laurence Hastings, 1st Earl of Pembroke 1325–1348
- John Hastings, 2nd Earl of Pembroke 1348–1375
- John Hastings, 3rd Earl of Pembroke 1375–1389

== Barons Bergavenny, first creation (1392–) (abeyant 1762) ==
- William de Beauchamp, 1st Baron Bergavenny (died 1411)
- Richard de Beauchamp, 1st Earl of Worcester, 2nd Baron Bergavenny (1397 – 1422) (created Earl of Worcester in 1421, which title extinct on his death)

Arms of Nevill, Barons Bergavenny: Gules, a saltire argent charged with a rose of the field (barbed and seeded proper). These are the ancient arms of Neville differenced by a rose, the symbol of a 7th son, in reference to Sir Edward Neville, 1st Baron Bergavenny (died 1476), husband of Elizabeth de Beauchamp & 7th son of Ralph Neville, 1st Earl of Westmorland. These arms are borne today by the Neville Marquesses of Abergavenny

- Elizabeth de Beauchamp, later Nevill, de jure 3rd Baroness Bergavenny (1415–1447)
- George Nevill, 4th Baron Bergavenny (2nd Baron of the 2nd creation) (1440–1492)
- George Nevill, 5th Baron Bergavenny (3rd Baron of the 2nd creation) (died 1535); during his lifetime, Henry VIII's Laws in Wales Acts extinguished his Marcher Lordship of Abergavenny, merging it into the new county of Monmouthshire. Like other such Marcher Lords, his rights were reduced by the Act to those of an English-style Baron.
- Henry Nevill, 6th Baron Bergavenny (4th Baron of the 2nd creation) (died 1587)
- Mary Nevill, later Fane, 3rd Baroness le Despenser, de jure 7th and 5th Baroness Bergavenny (1554–1626)
- Francis Fane, 1st Earl of Westmorland, de jure 8th and 6th Baron Bergavenny (1580–1629) (had already been created Earl of Westmorland)
- Mildmay Fane, 2nd Earl of Westmorland, de jure 9th and 7th Baron Bergavenny (1602–1666)
- Charles Fane, 3rd Earl of Westmorland, de jure 10th and 8th Baron Bergavenny (1635–1691)
- Vere Fane, 4th Earl of Westmorland, de jure 11th and 9th Baron Bergavenny (1645–1693)
- Vere Fane, 5th Earl of Westmorland, de jure 12th and 10th Baron Bergavenny (1678–1699)
- Thomas Fane, 6th Earl of Westmorland, de jure 13th and 15th Baron Bergavenny (1683–1736)
- John Fane, 7th Earl of Westmorland, de jure 14th and 12th Baron Bergavenny (1685–1762) (first and second creations abeyant on his death)

== Barons Bergavenny, second creation (1450–) (abeyant 1762) ==
- Edward Nevill, de facto 3rd Baron Bergavenny (1st Baron of the 2nd creation) (died 1476) (widower of the 3rd Baroness of the first creation)
- George Nevill, 4th Baron Bergavenny (2nd Baron of the 2nd creation) (1440–1492) (had already succeeded as 4th Baron of the first creation)

Thereafter held with the first creation

== Barons Bergavenny, third creation (1604 – ?) ==
- Edward Nevill, de facto 8th and de jure 1st Baron Bergavenny (1551–1622)
- Henry Nevill, de facto 9th and de jure 2nd Baron Bergavenny (died 1641)
- Margaret Nevill, later Brooke, de jure 3rd Baroness Bergavenny

Thereafter to her heirs?

== Barons Bergavenny, fourth creation (after 1641 – 1662) ==
- John Nevill, de facto 10th and de jure 1st Baron Bergavenny (1614–1662) (extinct on his death)

== Barons Bergavenny, fifth creation (after 1666 – 1695) ==
- George Nevill, de facto 12th and de jure 1st Baron Bergavenny (1665–1695) (extinct on his death)

== Barons Bergavenny, sixth creation (1695–) (abeyant 1811) ==
- George Nevill, de facto 13th and de jure 1st Baron Bergavenny (died 1721)
- George Nevill, de facto 14th and de jure 2nd Baron Bergavenny (1702–1723)
- Edward Nevill, de facto 15th and de jure 3rd Baron Bergavenny (died 1724) (abeyant on his death)
- Jane Nevill, later Walter, de jure 4th Baroness Bergavenny (died 1786) (abeyance terminated naturally in 1737)
- John Walter, de jure 5th Baron Bergavenny (died 1806)
- Charlotte Walter, later Senior, de jure 6th Baroness Bergavenny (died 1811) (abeyant on her death)

== Barons Bergavenny, seventh creation (1724–) (abeyant 1938) ==
- William Nevill, de facto 16th and de jure 1st Baron Bergavenny (died 1744)
- George Nevill, 1st Earl of Abergavenny, de facto 17th and de jure 2nd Baron Bergavenny (1727–1785) (created Earl of Abergavenny in 1784)
- Henry Nevill, 2nd Earl of Abergavenny, de facto 18th and de jure 3rd Baron Bergavenny (1755–1843)
- John Nevill, 3rd Earl of Abergavenny, de facto 19th and de jure 4th Baron Bergavenny (1789–1845)
- William Nevill, 4th Earl of Abergavenny, de facto 20th and de jure 5th Baron Bergavenny (1792–1868)
- William Nevill, 1st Marquess of Abergavenny, de facto 21st and de jure 6th Baron Bergavenny (1826–1915) (created Marquess of Abergavenny in 1876)
- Reginald William Bransby Nevill, 2nd Marquess of Abergavenny, de facto 22nd and de jure 7th Baron Bergavenny (1853–1927)
- Henry Gilbert Ralph Nevill, 3rd Marquess of Abergavenny, de facto 23rd and de jure 8th Baron Bergavenny (1854–1938) (abeyant on his death)

Co-heirs:

- David George Edward Henry Pratt, 6th Marquess Camden (born 1930) (half)
- Delaval Thomas Harold Astley, 23rd Baron Hastings (born 1960) (half)

== Traditional male-line succession ==
The succession to the notional male-line Barony of Bergavenny as it was generally assumed to be at the time was as follows:

- Edward Nevill, 3rd Baron Bergavenny (died 1476) (de jure 1st Baron)
- George Nevill, 4th Baron Bergavenny (1440–1492) (de jure 4th and 2nd Baron)
- George Nevill, 5th Baron Bergavenny (died 1535) (de jure 5th and 3rd Baron)
- Henry Nevill, 6th Baron Bergavenny (died 1587) (de jure 6th and 4th Baron)
- Edward Nevill, 7th Baron Bergavenny (died 1589)
- Edward Nevill, 8th Baron Bergavenny (1551–1622) (de jure 1st Baron)
- Henry Nevill, 9th Baron Bergavenny (died 1641) (de jure 2nd Baron)
- John Nevill, 10th Baron Bergavenny (1614–1662) (de jure 1st Baron)
- George Nevill, 11th Baron Bergavenny (died 1666) (never summoned to Parliament, so not a baron by writ)
- George Nevill, 12th Baron Bergavenny (1665–1695) (de jure 1st Baron)
- George Nevill, 13th Baron Bergavenny (died 1721) (de jure 1st Baron)
- George Nevill, 14th Baron Bergavenny (1702–1723) (de jure 2nd Baron)
- Edward Nevill, 15th Baron Bergavenny (died 1724) (de jure 3rd Baron)
- William Nevill, 16th Baron Bergavenny (died 1744) (de jure 1st Baron)
- George Nevill, 1st Earl of Abergavenny, 17th Baron Bergavenny (1727–1785) (de jure 2nd Baron) (created Earl of Abergavenny in 1784)
- Henry Nevill, 2nd Earl of Abergavenny, 18th Baron Bergavenny (1755–1843) (de jure 3rd Baron)
- John Nevill, 3rd Earl of Abergavenny, 19th Baron Bergavenny (1789–1845) (de jure 4th Baron)
- William Nevill, 4th Earl of Abergavenny, 20th Baron Bergavenny (1792–1868) (de jure 5th Baron)
- William Nevill, 1st Marquess of Abergavenny, 21st Baron Bergavenny (1826–1915) (de jure 6th Baron)
- Reginald William Bransby Nevill, 2nd Marquess of Abergavenny, 22nd Baron Bergavenny (1853–1927) (de jure 7th Baron)
- Henry Gilbert Ralph Nevill, 3rd Marquess of Abergavenny, 23rd Baron Bergavenny (1854–1938) (de jure 8th Baron)
- Guy Temple Montacute Larnach-Nevill, 4th Marquess of Abergavenny, 24th Baron Bergavenny (1883–1954)
- John Henry Guy Nevill, 5th Marquess of Abergavenny, 25th Baron Bergavenny (1914–2000)

On the death of the 5th Marquess of Abergavenny in 2000, the pretence that the Barony of Bergavenny descended to heirs male was finally dropped, and so the 6th Marquess of Abergavenny does not claim to hold it.

== Family tree ==
House of Neville family tree, including Earls of Westmorland, Earls of Abergavenny, Marquesses of Abergavenny, and many creations of the Barons Bergavenny

Geoffrey de Neville	Renata de Bulmer
Robert FitzMaldred c. 1150	Isabel de Neville
Geoffrey FitzRobert de Neville b. c. 1197
Baron Neville of Raby (1st creation by tenure), 1295
Geoffrey de Neville b. c. 1225; 1st Baron Nevill of Raby
Robert de Neville c. 1260/1270; 2nd Baron Nevill of Raby
Baron Neville of Raby (1st creation by writ), 1295
Ralph Neville; 1262–c. 1331; 3rd/1st Baron Neville de Raby
King Edward III; 1312–1377	Ralph Neville c. 1291–1367; 4th/2nd Baron Neville de Raby	Thomas Beauchamp c. 1313–1369; Earl of Warwick
Baron Bergavenny (1st creation), 1392
John of Gaunt; 1340–1377; Duke of Lancaster	John Neville; 5th/3rd Baron Neville de Raby c. 1337–1388	Alexander Neville c. 1340–1392; Archbishop of York	William Beauchamp c. 1343 – 1411; 1st Baron Bergavenny
Earl of Westmorland (1st creation), 1397
King Henry IV; 1367–1413	Joan Beaufort c. 1379–1440	Ralph Neville c. 1364–1425; 1st Earl of Westmorland; 6th/4th Baron Neville de Raby	John Neville c. 1382–1430; 6th Baron Latimer
King Henry V 1386–1422	John Neville c. 1387–1420	Richard Beauchamp c. 1394 – 1421/1422; Earl of Worcester, 2nd Baron Bergavenny
Baron Neville, 1459	Baron Latimer of Snape, 1432	Baron Bergavenny (2nd creation), 1450
Ralph Neville; 1406–1484; 2nd Earl of Westmorland; 7th/5th Baron Neville de Raby	John Neville c. 1410–1461; 1st Baron Neville (1459)	Richard Neville; 1400–1460; Earl of Salisbury	Alice Montacute; 1407–1462; Countess of Salisbury, Baroness Monthermer, 7th/Baroness Montagu	Robert Neville; 1404–1457; Bishop	Cecily Neville; 1415–1495	Richard of York; 1411–1460; Duke of York	William Neville c. 1405–1463; Earl of Kent	George Neville c. 1407–1469; 1st Baron Latimer of Snape	Edward Neville d. 1476; 3rd de facto Baron Bergavenny (1392), 1st Baron Bergavenny (1450)	Elizabeth Beauchamp; 1415–1448; 3rd Baroness Bergavenny de jure suo jure
Barony Neville attained, 1461 reversed, 1472
King Henry VI; 1421–1471	Cecily Neville c. 1425–1450	Richard Neville; 1428–1471; Earl of Warwick	John Neville; 1431–1471; Marquess of Montagu	George Neville; 1432–1476; Archbishop of York	Thomas Neville; 1429–1471; Viscount Fauconberg	Henry Neville of Latimer; 1437–1469
(m1.) Edward of Westminster; 1453–1471; Prince of Wales	King Edward IV; 1442–1483	Ralph Neville c. 1456–1499; 3rd Earl of Westmorland; 8th/6th Baron Neville de Raby; 2nd Baron Neville (1459)	(m2.) Richard III; 1452–1485	Anne Neville; 1456–1485	George Neville; 1461–1483; Duke of Bedford	Isabel Neville; 1451–1476	George Plantagenet; 1449–1478; Duke of Clarence	George Neville c. 1440–1492; 4th de facto Baron Bergavenny (1392), 2nd Baron Bergavenny (1450)
Ralph Neville d. 1498	Edward Plantagenet; 1475–1499; Earl of Warwick	Richard Neville c. 1468–1530; 2nd Baron Latimer of Snape	George Neville c. 1469–1535; 5th de facto Baron Bergavenny (1392), 3rd Baron Bergavenny (1450)	Edward Neville; 1471–1538	Thomas Nevill c. 1484–1542
Ralph Neville; 1498–1549; 4th Earl of Westmorland; 9th/7th Baron Neville de Raby; 3rd Baron Neville (1459)	John Neville; 1493–1543; 3rd Baron Latimer of Snape
Henry Neville; 1525–1569; 5th Earl of Westmorland; 10th/8th Baron Neville de Raby; 4th Baron Neville (1459)	John Neville; 1520–1577; 4th Baron Latimer of Snape	Henry Nevill c. 1527/1535–1587; 6th Baron Bergavenny (1392), 4th Baron Bergavenny (1450)	Edward Nevill c. 1526–1588; 7th de facto Baron Bergavenny (1392)	Henry Neville c. 1520–1593
Barony Latimer of Snape abeyant, 1577
Baron Bergavenny (3rd creation), 1604
Charles Neville; 1542–1601; 6th Earl of Westmorland; 11th/9th Baron Baron Neville de Raby; 5th Baron Neville (1459)'	Mary Nevill; 1554–1626; 7th/5th Baroness Bergavenny; 3rd Baroness le Despenser	Edward Nevill c. 1550–1622; 8th de facto Baron Bergavenny (1392), 1st Baron Bergavenny (1604)	Henry Neville c. 1564–1615
Earldom of Westmorland (1st creation) and subsidiary titles forfeit, 1571
Earl of Westmorland (2nd creation) and Baron Burghersh (3rd creation), 1624
Francis Fane; 1580–1629; 1st Earl of Westmorland, etc., 8th/6th Baron Bergavenny de jure, Baron le Despencer	Henry Nevill c. 1570–1641; 9th de facto Baron Bergavenny, 2nd Baron Bergavenny (1604)	Christopher d. 1649
Inheritance of Barony Bergavenny (3rd creation) unknown, 1641
Baron Bergavenny (4th creation), after 1641–1662
Mildmay Fane; 1602–1666; 2nd Earl of Westmorland, etc.	Francis Fane c. 1611–1681	John Nevill c. 1614–1662; 10th de facto Baron Bergavenny (1392), Baron Bergavenny (4th creation)	George Nevill c. 1615–1666; 11th Baron Bergavenny	Richard Nevill d. 1643
Barony Bergavenny (4th creation) extinct, 1662
Baron Bergavenny (5th creation), after 1666–1695
Francis Fane d. 1691	George Nevill; 1665–1695; 12th de facto Baron Bergavenny (1392), Baron Bergavenny (5th creation)	George Nevill d. 1665
Barony Bergavenny (5th creation) extinct, 1695
Baron Bergavenny (6th creation), 1695
Charles Fane; 1635–1691; 3rd Earl of Westmorland, etc.	Vere Fane; 1645–1693; 4th Earl of Westmorland, etc.	Henry Fane of Brympton; 1669–1726	George Nevill c. 1659–1720/21; 13th de facto Baron Bergavenny (1392), 1st Baron Bergavenny (1695)	Edward Nevill 1664–1701
Vere Fane; 1678–1698; 5th Earl of Westmorland, etc.	Thomas Fane; 1681–1736; 6th Earl of Westmorland, etc.	John Fane; 1686–1762; 7th Earl of Westmorland, etc.
Baron Bergavenny (6th creation) abeyance terminated, 1737	Baron Bergavenny (7th creation), 1724
Thomas Fane; 1701–1771; 8th Earl of Westmorland, etc.	George Nevill; 1702–1723; 14th de facto Baron Bergavenny (1392), 2nd Baron Bergavenny (1695)	Jane Nevill, later Walter; 1703–1786; 4th Baroness Bergavenny (1695)	Edward Nevill c. 1705–1724; 15th de facto Baron Bergavenny (1392), 3rd Baron Bergavenny (1695)	William Nevill d. 1744; 16th de facto Baron Bergavenny (1392), 1st Baron Bergavenny (1724)
Barony Bergavenny (6th creation) abeyant, 1724
Earl of Abergavenny and Viscount Nevill, 1784
John Fane; 1728–1774; 9th Earl of Westmorland, etc.	John Walter d. 1806; 5th Baron Bergavenny (1695)	Charlotte Walter, later Senior c. 1738–1811; 6th Baroness Bergavenny (1695)	George Nevill; 1727–1785; 1st Earl of Abergavenny, etc., 17th de facto Baron Bergavenny (1392), 2nd Baron Bergavenny (1724)	Edward Nevill b. 1729
Barony Bergavenny (6th creation) abeyant, 1811
John Fane; 1759–1841; 10th Earl of Westmorland, etc.	Henry Nevill; 1755–1843; 2nd Earl of Abergavenny, etc., 18th de facto Baron Bergavenny (1392), 3rd Baron Bergavenny (1724)
John Fane; 1784–1859; 11th Earl of Westmorland, etc.	John Nevill; 1789–1845; 3rd Earl of Abergavenny, etc., 19th de facto Baron Bergavenny (1392), 4th Baron Bergavenny (1724)	William Nevill; 1792–1868; 4th Earl of Abergavenny, etc., 20th de facto Baron Bergavenny (1392), 5th Baron Bergavenny (1724)
Marquess of Abergavenny and Earl of Lewes, 1876
Francis William Henry Fane; 1825–1891; 12th Earl of Westmorland, etc.	William Nevill; 1826–1915; 1st Marquess of Abergavenny, etc., 5th Earl of Abergavenny, etc., 21st de facto Baron Bergavenny (1392), 6th Baron Bergavenny (1724)	Caroline Emily Nevill; 1829–1887	Henrietta Augusta Nevill; 1830–1912	Ralph Pelham Nevill; 1832–1914
Anthony Mildmay Julian Fane; 1859–1922; 13th Earl of Westmorland, etc.	Reginald William Bransby Nevill; 1853–1927; 2nd Marquess of Abergavenny, etc., 6th Earl of Abergavenny, etc., 22th de facto Baron Bergavenny (1392), 7th Baron Bergavenny (1724)	Henry Gilbert Ralph Nevill; 1854–1938; 3rd Marquess of Abergavenny, etc., 7th Earl of Abergavenny, etc., 23rd de facto Baron Bergavenny (1392), 8th Baron Bergavenny (1724)	George Montacute Nevill; 1856–1920	William Beauchamp Nevill; 1860–1939	Richard Plantagenet Nevill; 1862–1939	Percy Llewelyn Nevill; 1877–1927
Barony Bergavenny (6th and 7th creations) abeyant, 1938
Vere Anthony Francis Fane; 1893–1948; 14th Earl of Westmorland, etc.	Guy Temple Montacute Larnach-Nevill; 1883–1954; 4th Marquess of Abergavenny, etc., 8th Earl of Abergavenny, etc.
David Anthony Thomas Fane; 1924–1993; 15th Earl of Westmorland, etc.	John Henry Guy Nevill; 1914–2000; 5th Marquess of Abergavenny, etc., 9th Earl of Abergavenny, etc.	Rupert Charles Montecute Nevill; 1923–1982	Michael George Ralph Nevill; 1917–1943
Anthony David Francis Henry Fane b. 1951; 16th Earl of Westmorland, etc.	Harry St. Clair Fane; 1953–2023 styled Lord Burghersh	Christopher George Charles Nevill b. 1955; 6th Marquess of Abergavenny, etc., 10th Earl of Abergavenny, etc.	David Michael Ralph Nevill; 1941-2025	Michael George Rathmore Nevill b. 1943
Daisy Caroline Fane b. 1989	Sam Michael David Fane b. 1989	Guy Michael Rossmore Nevill b. 1973
Heir presumptive to the Earldom of Westmorland	Heir presumptive to the Earldom of Abergavenny
George David Roland Nevill b. 2010	Frederick Guy James Nevill b. 2012	Ralph William James Nevill b. 2015
