= George Neville =

George Neville or Nevill may refer to:

- George Neville (bishop) (c. 1432–1476), archbishop of York
- George Nevill, 4th Baron Bergavenny (c. 1440–1492), 4th and de jure 2nd Baron Bergavenny
- George Nevill, 5th Baron Bergavenny (c. 1469–1535), 5th and de jure 3rd Baron Bergavenny, Lord Warden of the Cinque Ports
- George Nevill, 11th Baron Bergavenny (bef. 1641–1666), de facto English peer
- George Nevill, 12th Baron Bergavenny (1665–1695), English peer
- George Nevill, 13th Baron Bergavenny (c. 1659–1720/21), English peer
- George Nevill, 14th Baron Bergavenny (1702–1723), English peer
- George Neville, 1st Baron Latimer (died 1469), English peer
- George Nevill, 1st Earl of Abergavenny (1727–1785), English peer
- George Neville, Duke of Bedford (1457–1483), English nobleman
- George Neville (Royal Navy officer) (1850–1923), Royal Navy admiral
- George Neville (priest) (died 1588), Archdeacon of Carlisle
