= John Neville =

John Neville may refer to:

- John Neville, 3rd Baron Neville (c. 1330–1388), English nobleman and soldier
- John Neville, Baron Neville (c. 1410–1461), English Lancastrian nobleman and soldier
- John Neville, 1st Marquess of Montagu (c. 1431–1471), Yorkist magnate
- Sir John Neville II (by 1488–1541), English courtier, soldier and MP
- John Neville, 3rd Baron Latimer (1493–1543), English Peer, second husband of Catherine Parr
- John Neville, 4th Baron Latimer (1520–1577), English peer
- John Neville (general) (1731–1803), American Revolutionary War officer later prominent in the Whiskey Rebellion
- John C. Neville (1815–1898), Wisconsin politician
- John Neville (actor) (1925–2011), English-Canadian stage and theater actor
- John Neville (died 1420), eldest son of Ralph Neville, 1st Earl of Westmorland
- John Elliott Neville, prisoner who died in 2019 after being restrained at the Forsyth County, North Carolina jail
- John T. Neville (1886–1970), American screenwriter

John Nevill may refer to:

- John Nevill, 10th Baron Bergavenny (c. 1614 – 1662), English peer
- John Nevill, 3rd Earl of Abergavenny (1789–1845), English peer
- John Nevill, 5th Marquess of Abergavenny (1914–2000), British peer
