= House of Neville =

English noble family

- Arms of Neville: Gules, a saltire argent
- Country: England; United Kingdom
- Founded: Before 1129; 897 years ago
- Founder: Uhtred
- Current head: Christopher Nevill, 6th Marquess of Abergavenny
- Titles: See list: Duke of Bedford; Marquess of Montagu; Marquess of Abergavenny; Earl of Westmorland; Earl of Salisbury; Earl of Warwick; Earl of Kent; Earl of Northumberland; Earl of Abergavenny; Earl of Lewes; Viscount Nevill; Baron Neville; Baron Latimer; Baron Furnivall; Baron Montagu; Baron Fauconberg; Baron Bergavenny

The House of Neville or Nevill family (originally FitzMaldred) is an English noble house of early medieval origin, which was a leading force in English politics in the Late Middle Ages. The family became one of the two major powers in northern England and played a central role in the Wars of the Roses along with their rival, the House of Percy.

== Origins ==
The great Neville family traces its origins to Geoffrey "de Neville" (died c. 1242), the son of Robert FitzMaldred and Isabel de Neville, who adopted the family name of his mother.

=== Male line of Robert FitzMaldred ===
The male line of the Nevilles was of native origin, and the family may well have been part of the pre-Conquest aristocracy of Northumbria. Following the Norman Conquest in 1066 most of the existing Anglo-Saxon aristocracy of England were dispossessed and replaced by a new Norman ruling elite, and although such survivals are very rare, continued landholding by native families was more common in the far north of England, including in County Durham, the area of their earliest recorded landholdings.

The male-line of the family can be traced back to a certain Uhtred, whose identity is unclear, since the ancestors of Robert FitzMaldred first appear in surviving records only decades after the Norman Conquest of England in 1066 and the compiling of the Domesday Book in 1086, which did not cover County Durham. In the 16th century, the Nevilles claimed that their ancestor Uhtred was descended from Crinan of Dunkeld, ancestor of the Scottish royal House of Dunkeld. As well as prestigious ancient connections with the royal families of both England and Scotland, this claim entailed a line of descent from the Bamburgh dynasty of Earls of Northumbria, attaching the Nevilles' later power in the north to a pedigree of pre-eminence in the region stretching back at least as far as the early 10th century. Modern genealogists have speculated about theories to connect Uhtred with his purported forebears, but none of these is supported by any direct evidence. Meanwhile, Horace Round (1895) suggests that Uhtred may have been identical with the man of that name who was a son of Ligulf, a great Northumbrian thegn killed at Durham in 1080.

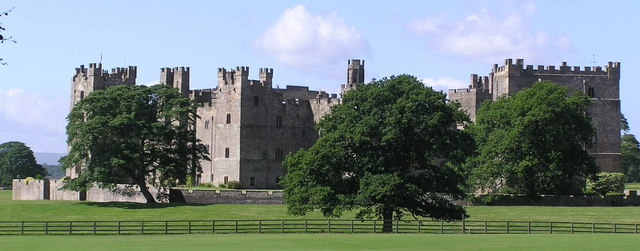
Raby Castle in County Durham

Dolfin, called in the records "son of Uhtred", is first attested in 1129, as holding the manor of Staindrop (formerly Stainthorp) in County Durham, from the Prior of Durham. It shared with a vast church estate some limited common land of 14,000 acres (5,700 ha). This locality remained the principal seat of the family until 1569, their chief residence being at Raby in the north of the parish of Staindrop, where in the 14th century they built the present Raby Castle.

Dolfin was succeeded by his son Meldred. He in turn was succeeded by his son Robert FitzMeldred.

Already before the Neville marriage, the FitzMeldred family was a major power in the area: "In the extent of their landed possessions this family, holding on obdurately to native names for a full hundred years after 1066, was pre-eminent among the lay proprietors within the bishopric of Durham during the twelfth century".

=== Female line of de Nevilles ===
The Anglo-Norman Ancient House of de Nevilles traces back to Odo, Count of Penthièvre and his son Ribald.

In 1069, William the Conqueror granted the Lordship of Middleham to his Breton cousin Alan Rufus, son of Odo, who built a wooden motte-and-bailey castle above the town. It has been dubbed the "Windsor of the North". By the time of the 1086 Domesday Book, Alan had passed the castle to his brother Ribald.

Middleham Castle eventually passed to Ribald's descendant Geoffrey de Neville (died 1193), 2nd feudal baron of Ashby in Lincolnshire. At some time before 1176 he married Emma de Bulmer (died 1208), who brought to her husband several estates, including Brancepeth Castle in County Durham and Sheriff Hutton Castle near Bulmer, Raskelf and Sutton-in-the-Forest, all in Yorkshire.

His second child and heiress was Isabel de Neville (died 1248/54), who married Robert FitzMaldred (1170/4-1242/8).

=== Geoffrey "de Neville" ===
Geoffrey "de Neville" (died c. 1242) inherited the estates of his mother's family as well as his father's, and adopted his mother's surname, but retained his paternal arms of Gules, a saltire argent. In Norman-ruled England, a Norman surname was more prestigious and socially advantageous than his original English surname FitzRobert.

Geoffrey de Neville's eldest son and heir was Robert de Neville, Sheriff of Yorkshire and Sheriff of Northumberland (1258). Other children include Geoffrey—who was to start a cadet branch of the family in Hornby, Lancashire—John, and Hugh. The identity of the mother, however, is disputed among scholars. A. F. Pollard, for example, writing in the Dictionary of National Biography in 1894 suggested that she was Margaret, daughter of Sir John de Longvillers. However, this Margaret was married until 1285, and there is evidence from a Lincolnshire fine of 1247 which refers to one Robert de Neville, knight, and his mother, Joan. (Note: The situation is further confused by the fact that a number of Geoffrey de Nevilles extant in this period; apart from Robert's brother, another Geoffrey de Neville died in 1249. The historian Charles Robert Young, on the other hand, suggests that Robert married one Ida and that it was his brother Geoffrey who married Margaret de Longvilliers. Name of his wife as Joan can be also derived from a 1273 charter from her son Robert de Neville (died 1282) to Marton Priory, Yorkshire, mentioning the "souls of his parents Geoffrey and Joan and for the souls of both of his own wives.")

== Rise to power ==
The family's wealth and power grew steadily over the following centuries. Their regional power benefited greatly from frequent appointment to such royal offices as sheriff, castellan, justice of the forest, and justice of the peace in various parts of northern England. This prominent office-holding began with Geoffrey de Neville's son Robert, in the reign of Henry III, whom Robert supported against the barons under Simon de Montfort. The Nevilles also held administrative office under the prince-bishops of Durham. Robert's grandson Ralph Neville was one of the founding members of the Peerage of England, being summoned to sit in the House of Lords at its establishment in 1295, and thus initiating the line of Barons Neville de Raby.

Service in the wars of the late 13th and 14th centuries against Scotland, and later in the Hundred Years' War in France was of key importance in further enhancing the family's standing. In 1334 Ralph Neville, Lord of Raby was appointed one of the wardens of the marches, the chief officers for frontier defence, and the Nevilles were habitually appointed to these posts thereafter. Ralph commanded the force that crushed an invading Scottish army at the Battle of Neville's Cross outside Durham and captured King David II in 1346. In the mid-14th century, the Nevilles became involved in naval defence as well, holding the post of Admiral of the North. During this period they also began to be appointed to high office at court and in the Church: the victor of Neville's Cross served as Steward of the Royal Household, and on his death was succeeded in the office by his eldest son John. John's brother Alexander Neville became Archbishop of York and was a close advisor of Richard II. As such, he was prosecuted, along with Richard's other leading adherents, when the disgruntled Lords Appellant seized power in 1386–9. He suffered the confiscation of his property but, as a clergyman, he escaped the death sentences imposed on his colleagues.

By the late 14th century, the family had acquired an extensive array of estates across northern England. Besides their original powerbase in County Durham, they possessed a large block of lands in northern and central Yorkshire and significant holdings in Cumberland and Northumberland. They also held scattered estates in Lancashire and further south in Lincolnshire, Norfolk, Northamptonshire, Bedfordshire and Essex. In addition to Raby, they acquired or built important castles at Brancepeth near Durham and at Middleham, Sheriff Hutton and Snape in Yorkshire. Although geographically concentrated, their main estates were organised into three different administrative units (receiverships), based at Raby, Middleham and Sheriff Hutton. These were respectively responsible for the holdings in County Durham, in north-western Yorkshire, and in central Yorkshire. Towards the end of the 14th century, Middleham became a second habitual residence of the head of the family.

== Earls of Westmorland ==
The Nevilles' emergence into the highest echelon of the aristocracy received formal recognition in 1397, when the Lord of Raby Ralph Neville was created Earl of Westmorland by Richard II. By this time the Nevilles' power in the north was matched only by the Percy Earls of Northumberland, with whom they developed an acrimonious rivalry. These competing northern magnates enjoyed an exceptional degree of autonomy from royal authority, owing to the remoteness and insecurity of the region where they were established. The king, whose court was based in the south, had to rely on powerful lords from both houses to protect the border from Scottish invasion, counterbalance each other's influence, and help with general governance.

Although the family had previously been close to Richard II, Earl Ralph was quick to join Henry Bolingbroke when he landed in England to overthrow Richard in 1399. Shortly after Bolingbroke's successful usurpation, taking the throne as Henry IV, Westmorland was rewarded with marriage to the new king's half-sister Joan Beaufort, daughter of prince John of Gaunt, Duke of Lancaster. Henry extended Richard II's policy of bolstering the strength of the Nevilles as a check to the troublesome Percys. The family gained from the weakening of Percy power as a result of the Crown's suppression of a series of rebellions involving that family in the 1400s.

While increasing the political standing of the Nevilles, the royal marriage led to a serious split in the family. Earl Ralph had previously been married to Margaret de Stafford, and the title of Earl of Westmorland descended through his son by this marriage. However, he favoured his sons by his second marriage, who received the bulk of the family lands on his death. This led to bitter disputes over the inheritance and lasting estrangement between the Nevilles of Raby, descended from Margaret Stafford, and the Nevilles of Middleham, descended from Joan Beaufort.

In addition to his patrimonial inheritance, Ralph's eldest son by Joan, Richard Neville, acquired the earldom of Salisbury by marriage to its heiress. Salisbury's own eldest son Richard became Earl of Warwick by the same means. These marriages brought the family huge new estates. Those of the earldom of Warwick, inherited from the Beauchamp family, were concentrated chiefly in Warwickshire and Worcestershire, but with lesser holdings in County Durham, Devon, Cornwall and the Welsh Marches. The main Salisbury lands, formerly held by the Montagus, were widely distributed across the south-west, with clusters in Devon, Dorset, Somerset and Wiltshire. The family also acquired the barony of Latimer through the marriage of the first Earl of Westmorland's father, later passed on to one of the first earl's younger sons, and the baronies of Fauconberg and Bergavenny through the marriages of two more of those sons.

== Wars of the Roses ==
=== Yorkist champions ===
Salisbury and Warwick became the most important supporters of Richard, Duke of York during the early stages of the Wars of the Roses. They probably hoped that a Yorkist seizure of power would bring a favourable resolution of major inheritance disputes involving Warwick, and of a sporadically violent struggle for preeminence in the north between Salisbury and the Percys. They were also connected to York by marriage, as he had married Salisbury's sister Cecily; their children included the future kings Edward IV and Richard III. In addition to their own wealth and armed following, the Nevilles' heft in this and subsequent conflicts was enhanced by Warwick's position as Constable of Calais and commissioner for the keeping of the seas. These offices gave him command of England's only significant standing armed force and control of a war-fleet. They also enabled him to develop close ties with the London corporation of the Merchants of the Staple, a major source of financial support, and to gain popularity with the discontented populace of London and the south-east, especially Kent, whom Warwick and his allies repeatedly stirred into revolt. York and Salisbury were both killed at the Battle of Wakefield in 1460, but Warwick helped York's son Edward, Earl of March, to depose Henry VI and gain the throne as Edward IV in 1461.

Among the family's rewards for their support was the elevation of Salisbury's brother, the veteran soldier William Neville, Lord Fauconberg, as Earl of Kent. He, Warwick, and Salisbury's younger son John Neville, now ennobled as Baron Montagu, directed the suppression of lingering Lancastrian resistance in the north, where the ousted dynasty clung on for three years after their decisive defeat at the Battle of Towton in 1461. The Percys were among the principal supporters of the Lancastrian cause, and following the death at Towton of Henry Percy, Earl of Northumberland, and the final elimination of resistance in the north in 1464, the Nevilles secured their greatest triumph over their rivals, acquiring the earldom of Northumberland for John Neville in 1465.

=== Disaffection and defection ===
Warwick, now the richest man in England after the king, was the power behind the throne in Edward's regime during its early years, but the two men later fell out. Their estrangement was due in large part to the king's secret marriage in 1464 to Elizabeth Woodville. This humiliated Warwick, who had negotiated an agreement with Louis XI of France for Edward to marry the French king's sister-in-law. Relations were further aggravated by the subsequent influence of the Woodvilles, who successfully opposed Warwick over foreign policy.

In 1469 Warwick seized control of government, in conjunction with his brother George Neville, Archbishop of York, and Edward's own brother George Plantagenet, Duke of Clarence. Their alliance had been sealed by Clarence's marriage to Warwick's daughter Isabel. Warwick and Clarence imprisoned the king and sought to rule in his name, but the new regime was unable to impose its authority, and Edward was released. The king refrained from punishing the rebels, but sought to reestablish a northern counterweight to the Nevilles by restoring the earldom of Northumberland to the dispossessed heir, Henry Percy. This meant depriving John Neville, who had remained loyal to the king when his brothers rebelled, of his title, lands and offices. Edward sought to retain John's allegiance by compensating him with estates in the south-west, the new title of Marquess of Montagu, and the betrothal of his young son George Neville to the king's eldest daughter and current heir, Elizabeth of York. George was made Duke of Bedford in recognition of his future prospects. All this, however, evidently failed to mollify Montagu.

Warwick and Clarence again rebelled in 1470, apparently aiming to put Clarence on the throne. Defeated, they fled abroad, where they made common cause with the exiled Lancastrians, marrying Warwick's daughter Anne to Henry VI's only son Edward of Westminster. When Warwick and other leaders of this alliance landed in England to raise revolt once more, they were backed by leading nobles still in England, including Montagu, who turned the troops he had nominally raised for Edward IV against the king. Edward fled the country and Henry VI was briefly restored to the throne, but Edward soon counter-attacked successfully, and Warwick and Montagu were killed at the Battle of Barnet in 1471.

=== Aftermath ===
Warwick and Montagu were never formally attainted, which would have meant the forfeiture of their property. Nonetheless, the victorious Yorkists did not allow the process of inheritance to follow its normal legal course. Montagu's estates should have passed to his son George Neville, Duke of Bedford, along with the considerable portion of Warwick's inherited possessions which had been entailed to heirs male, giving Bedford precedence over Warwick's daughters. However, in practice Bedford was denied his inheritance, while his engagement to Elizabeth of York was cancelled. He would eventually be deprived of his title by an act of Parliament in 1478, ostensibly on the grounds that he lacked the wealth required to maintain the standing of a duke.

The legacy of the Middleham Nevilles instead became the object of dispute between King Edward's brothers: Richard, Duke of Gloucester, and Clarence, who had returned to the family fold before the Battle of Barnet. Clarence, whose claim was founded on his marriage to Isabel Neville, gained the earldoms of Warwick and Salisbury. Gloucester acquired the old Neville estates in the north, establishing his claim by marrying Anne Neville, who had been widowed by Prince Edward's death in the final Lancastrian defeat at the Battle of Tewkesbury in 1471. The northern lands and clientage inherited from the Nevilles became Gloucester's main powerbase, and he adopted Middleham Castle as his principal residence until his usurpation of the throne as Richard III in 1483.

Reflecting the estrangement between the two branches of the family, the Nevilles of Raby, headed by Ralph Neville, Earl of Westmorland, had sided with the Lancastrians from the outset. Westmorland's brother John Neville, Lord of Raby was killed in the defeat at Towton. The line of the Earls of Westmorland survived the wars, but the loss of most of the ancestral estates through their inheritance by the Nevilles of Middleham and their subsequent downfall left the family a much diminished force.

Junior lines of the Middleham Nevilles also survived, including the holders of the Latimer and Bergavenny baronies, based, respectively, at Snape and at Abergavenny Castle. Edward Neville, Lord Bergavenny had for many years been forcibly deprived of his inheritance by his nephew the Earl of Warwick. During the wars, each of these lines of the family had fought sometimes alongside and sometimes against the core group of Middleham Nevilles led by Salisbury and Warwick.

== Later history ==
The regional power of the northern magnates, already severely weakened by the losses suffered in the Wars of the Roses, was further diminished by the growing power of central government in the 16th century. In 1569 the Nevilles and Percys buried their traditional rivalry to undertake the Revolt of the Northern Earls, an attempt to overthrow Elizabeth I and replace her with the Catholic Mary, Queen of Scots. The rebellion was a fiasco, and the Earl of Westmorland, Charles Neville, fled into exile abroad. He was attainted in his absence, losing his title and lands. When he died in 1601 he left no male heir, thus extinguishing the senior Neville line.

The Latimer branch of the family had also died out in 1577, but the Bergavenny line endured. After the death of Henry Nevill, 6th Baron Bergavenny in 1587, his daughter Mary Nevill(e) fought a legal battle to be recognised as heiress to all the remaining Neville inheritance. Ultimately, however, these lands were split between her and her first cousin Edward Nevill, who inherited the baronial title. Her son Francis Fane inherited through her the very old title of Baron le Despencer; to him, the Neville family's senior title of Earl of Westmorland was recreated, and remains with his male-line descendants.

Edward Nevill's descendants were raised to the status of Earls and then Marquesses of Abergavenny. This line continues; the present head of the family is Christopher Nevill, the 6th Marquess. His family lands have been eroded through the passage of time (whether by subdivision or inheritance tax), but the main home, at Eridge Park in East Sussex, has been in the family since 1448.

== Titles ==
Title	Held	Designation and details
Baron Neville de Raby	1295–1571	Created by writ in the Peerage of England in 1295 when Ralph Neville was summoned to Parliament. Attainted in 1571.
Earl of Westmorland	1397–1571	Created in the Peerage of England in 1397 for Ralph Neville, 4th Baron Neville de Raby. Attainted in 1571.
Earl of Salisbury	1428–1471	Richard Neville, the son of Ralph Neville, 1st Earl of Westmorland, married Alice Montacute, the heiress of Thomas Montacute, 4th Earl of Salisbury and inherited the title. Deprived in 1471.
Baron Fauconberg	1429–1463	William Neville, the son of Ralph Neville, 1st Earl of Westmorland, married Joan Fauconberg, daughter of Thomas de Fauconberg, 5th Baron Fauconberg, and became Baron Fauconberg jure uxoris. Abeyant on his death in 1463.
Baron Latymer	1432–1577	Created in the Peerage of England by writ in 1432 when George Nevill, the son of Ralph Neville, 1st Earl of Westmorland was summoned to Parliament. Abeyant in 1577.
Baron Bergavenny	1447–1938	Created in the Peerage of England by writ in 1447 when Edward Nevill, the 7th son of Ralph Neville, 1st Earl of Westmorland, and husband of Elizabeth de Beauchamp, suo jure 3rd Baroness Bergavenny, was summoned to Parliament. Abeyant in 1938.
Earl of Warwick	1449–1471	Richard Neville, the son of Richard Neville, 5th Earl of Salisbury, married Anne Beauchamp, the heiress of Richard de Beauchamp, 13th Earl of Warwick and became Earl of Warwick jure uxoris. Deprived in 1471.
Baron Montagu	1461–1471	Created in the Peerage of England by writ in 1461 when John Neville, the son of Richard Neville, 5th Earl of Salisbury was summoned to Parliament. Deprived in 1471.
Earl of Kent	1461–1463	William Neville, 6th Baron Fauconberg created Earl of Kent in the Peerage of England in 1461. Extinct on his death in 1463.
Earl of Northumberland	1465–1470	John Neville, 1st Baron Montagu created Earl of Northumberland in the Peerage of England in 1465, following the death and attainder of Henry Percy, 3rd Earl of Northumberland. Deprived in 1470, for the title to be restored to Henry Percy, 4th Earl of Northumberland.
Marquess of Montagu	1470–1471	Created in the Peerage of England in 1470 for John Neville, 1st Earl of Northumberland. Deprived in 1471.
Duke of Bedford	1470–1478	George Neville, the son of John Neville, 1st Marquess of Montagu, created Duke of Bedford in the Peerage of England in 1470. Deprived by Act of Parliament in 1478.
Earl of Abergavenny	1784–present	Created in the Peerage of Great Britain in 1784 for George Neville, 17th Baron Bergavenny. Extant.
Marquess of Abergavenny	1876–present	Created in the Peerage of Great Britain in 1876 for William Neville, 5th Earl of Abergavenny. Extant.
Earl of Lewes	1876–present	Created in the Peerage of Great Britain in 1876 for William Neville, 5th Earl of Abergavenny. Extant.

== Members in the male line ==
John Neville, 3rd Baron Neville de Raby

1. Ralph Neville, 1st Earl of Westmorland, c. 1364 – 1425

A. John Neville, Lord Neville c. 1387 – 1420

I. Ralph Neville, 2nd Earl of Westmorland c. 1406 – 1484
II. John Neville, Baron Neville c. 1410 – 1461

a. Ralph Neville, 3rd Earl of Westmorland

i. Ralph Neville, Lord Neville

1. Ralph Neville, 4th Earl of Westmorland

A. Henry Neville, 5th Earl of Westmorland

I. Charles Neville, 6th Earl of Westmorland

III. Thomas Neville of Brancepeth (Disinherited branch)

a. Humphrey Neville of Brancepeth c. 1439 – 1469
b. Charles

B. Sir Ralph Neville, died 1458
C. Richard Neville, 5th Earl of Salisbury, 1400–1460

I. Richard Neville, 16th Earl of Warwick, 1428–1471 (two daughters)
II. John Neville, 1st Marquess of Montagu, 1431–1471

a. George Neville, 1st Duke of Bedford, 1461–1483

III. George Neville, Archbishop of York, 1432–1476
IV. Thomas Neville, 1443–1460

D. Robert Neville, died 1457, Bishop of Durham
E. William Neville, 1st Earl of Kent, 1410–1463

I. Anthony Neville, Lord Grey
II. Thomas Neville, Viscount Fauconberg, (1429–1471)

F. John Neville (c. 1406)
G. George Neville, 1st Baron Latimer c. 1407 – 1469

I. Sir Henry Neville (1437–1469), of Latimer

a. Richard Neville, 2nd Baron Latimer

i. John Neville, 3rd Baron Latimer

1. John Neville, 4th Baron Latimer

ii. William Neville

1. Richard Neville

A. Edmund Neville

H. Thomas Neville, c. 1410
I. Cuthbert Neville, c. 1411
J. Edward Neville, 3rd Baron Bergavenny, 1414–1476

I. Richard Nevill, 1439–1476
II. George Nevill, 4th Baron Bergavenny, 1440–1492

a. George Nevill, 5th Baron Bergavenny, 1469–1535

i. Henry Nevill, 6th Baron Bergavenny, 1527–1587

b. Edward Neville, 1471–1538

i. Edward Nevill, 7th Baron Bergavenny, 1526–1588

1. Edward Nevill, 8th Baron Bergavenny, 1550–1622

A. Henry Nevill, 9th Baron Bergavenny, 1580–1641

I. John Nevill, 10th Baron Bergavenny, 1614–1662
II. George Nevill, 11th Baron Bergavenny, 1641–1666

a. George Nevill, 12th Baron Bergavenny, 1665–1695

=== Unknown connection ===
- Sir Thomas Neville (died 1387) of Hornby

== Family tree ==
House of Neville family tree, including Earls of Westmorland, Earls of Abergavenny, Marquesses of Abergavenny, and many creations of the Barons Bergavenny

Uhtred
Dolfin d. aft. 1129	Gilbert de Neville d.1166/9 1st baron of Ashby
Maldred	Geoffrey de Neville d. 1193; 2nd baron of Ashby	Renata de Bulmer
Robert FitzMaldred c. 1150; Lord of Raby	Isabel de Neville
Geoffrey FitzRobert de Neville b. c. 1197–c. 1242; 1st Baron Nevill of Raby
Robert de Neville c. 1223–1282; 2nd Baron Nevill of Raby
Robert de Neville d. bef. 1282
Baron Neville of Raby (1st creation by writ), 1295
Ralph Neville; 1262–c. 1331; 3rd/1st Baron Neville de Raby
King Edward III; 1312–1377	Ralph Neville c. 1291–1367; 4th/2nd Baron Neville de Raby	Thomas Beauchamp c. 1313–1369; Earl of Warwick
Baron Bergavenny (1st creation), 1392
John of Gaunt; 1340–1377; Duke of Lancaster	John Neville; 5th/3rd Baron Neville de Raby c. 1337–1388	Alexander Neville c. 1340–1392; Archbishop of York	William Beauchamp c. 1343 – 1411; 1st Baron Bergavenny
Earl of Westmorland (1st creation), 1397
King Henry IV; 1367–1413	Joan Beaufort c. 1379–1440	Ralph Neville c. 1364–1425; 1st Earl of Westmorland; 6th/4th Baron Neville de Raby	John Neville c. 1382–1430; 6th Baron Latimer
King Henry V 1386–1422	John Neville c. 1387–1420	Richard Beauchamp c. 1394 – 1421/1422; Earl of Worcester, 2nd Baron Bergavenny
Baron Neville, 1459	Baron Latimer of Snape, 1432	Baron Bergavenny (2nd creation), 1450
Ralph Neville; 1406–1484; 2nd Earl of Westmorland; 7th/5th Baron Neville de Raby	John Neville c. 1410–1461; 1st Baron Neville (1459)	Richard Neville; 1400–1460; Earl of Salisbury	Alice Montacute; 1407–1462; Countess of Salisbury, Baroness Monthermer, 7th/Baroness Montagu	Robert Neville; 1404–1457; Bishop	Cecily Neville; 1415–1495	Richard of York; 1411–1460; Duke of York	William Neville c. 1405–1463; Earl of Kent	George Neville c. 1407–1469; 1st Baron Latimer of Snape	Edward Neville d. 1476; 3rd de facto Baron Bergavenny (1392), 1st Baron Bergavenny (1450)	Elizabeth Beauchamp; 1415–1448; 3rd Baroness Bergavenny de jure suo jure
Barony Neville attained, 1461 reversed, 1472
King Henry VI; 1421–1471	Cecily Neville c. 1425–1450	Richard Neville; 1428–1471; Earl of Warwick	John Neville; 1431–1471; Marquess of Montagu	George Neville; 1432–1476; Archbishop of York	Thomas Neville; 1429–1471; Viscount Fauconberg	Henry Neville of Latimer; 1437–1469
(m1.) Edward of Westminster; 1453–1471; Prince of Wales	King Edward IV; 1442–1483	Ralph Neville c. 1456–1499; 3rd Earl of Westmorland; 8th/6th Baron Neville de Raby; 2nd Baron Neville (1459)	(m2.) Richard III; 1452–1485	Anne Neville; 1456–1485	George Neville; 1461–1483; Duke of Bedford	Isabel Neville; 1451–1476	George Plantagenet; 1449–1478; Duke of Clarence	George Neville c. 1440–1492; 4th de facto Baron Bergavenny (1392), 2nd Baron Bergavenny (1450)
Ralph Neville d. 1498	Edward Plantagenet; 1475–1499; Earl of Warwick	Richard Neville c. 1468–1530; 2nd Baron Latimer of Snape	George Neville c. 1469–1535; 5th de facto Baron Bergavenny (1392), 3rd Baron Bergavenny (1450)	Edward Neville; 1471–1538	Thomas Nevill c. 1484–1542
Ralph Neville; 1498–1549; 4th Earl of Westmorland; 9th/7th Baron Neville de Raby; 3rd Baron Neville (1459)	John Neville; 1493–1543; 3rd Baron Latimer of Snape
Henry Neville; 1525–1569; 5th Earl of Westmorland; 10th/8th Baron Neville de Raby; 4th Baron Neville (1459)	John Neville; 1520–1577; 4th Baron Latimer of Snape	Henry Nevill c. 1527/1535–1587; 6th Baron Bergavenny (1392), 4th Baron Bergavenny (1450)	Edward Nevill c. 1526–1588; 7th de facto Baron Bergavenny (1392)	Henry Neville c. 1520–1593
Barony Latimer of Snape abeyant, 1577
Baron Bergavenny (3rd creation), 1604
Charles Neville; 1542–1601; 6th Earl of Westmorland; 11th/9th Baron Baron Neville de Raby; 5th Baron Neville (1459)'	Mary Nevill; 1554–1626; 7th/5th Baroness Bergavenny; 3rd Baroness le Despenser	Edward Nevill c. 1550–1622; 8th de facto Baron Bergavenny (1392), 1st Baron Bergavenny (1604)	Henry Neville c. 1564–1615
Earldom of Westmorland (1st creation) and subsidiary titles forfeit, 1571
Earl of Westmorland (2nd creation) and Baron Burghersh (3rd creation), 1624
Francis Fane; 1580–1629; 1st Earl of Westmorland, etc., 8th/6th Baron Bergavenny de jure, Baron le Despencer	Henry Nevill c. 1570–1641; 9th de facto Baron Bergavenny, 2nd Baron Bergavenny (1604)	Christopher d. 1649
Inheritance of Barony Bergavenny (3rd creation) unknown, 1641
Baron Bergavenny (4th creation), after 1641–1662
Mildmay Fane; 1602–1666; 2nd Earl of Westmorland, etc.	Francis Fane c. 1611–1681	John Nevill c. 1614–1662; 10th de facto Baron Bergavenny (1392), Baron Bergavenny (4th creation)	George Nevill c. 1615–1666; 11th Baron Bergavenny	Richard Nevill d. 1643
Barony Bergavenny (4th creation) extinct, 1662
Baron Bergavenny (5th creation), after 1666–1695
Francis Fane d. 1691	George Nevill; 1665–1695; 12th de facto Baron Bergavenny (1392), Baron Bergavenny (5th creation)	George Nevill d. 1665
Barony Bergavenny (5th creation) extinct, 1695
Baron Bergavenny (6th creation), 1695
Charles Fane; 1635–1691; 3rd Earl of Westmorland, etc.	Vere Fane; 1645–1693; 4th Earl of Westmorland, etc.	Henry Fane of Brympton; 1669–1726	George Nevill c. 1659–1720/21; 13th de facto Baron Bergavenny (1392), 1st Baron Bergavenny (1695)	Edward Nevill 1664–1701
Vere Fane; 1678–1698; 5th Earl of Westmorland, etc.	Thomas Fane; 1681–1736; 6th Earl of Westmorland, etc.	John Fane; 1686–1762; 7th Earl of Westmorland, etc.
Baron Bergavenny (6th creation) abeyance terminated, 1737	Baron Bergavenny (7th creation), 1724
Thomas Fane; 1701–1771; 8th Earl of Westmorland, etc.	George Nevill; 1702–1723; 14th de facto Baron Bergavenny (1392), 2nd Baron Bergavenny (1695)	Jane Nevill, later Walter; 1703–1786; 4th Baroness Bergavenny (1695)	Edward Nevill c. 1705–1724; 15th de facto Baron Bergavenny (1392), 3rd Baron Bergavenny (1695)	William Nevill d. 1744; 16th de facto Baron Bergavenny (1392), 1st Baron Bergavenny (1724)
Barony Bergavenny (6th creation) abeyant, 1724
Earl of Abergavenny and Viscount Nevill, 1784
John Fane; 1728–1774; 9th Earl of Westmorland, etc.	John Walter d. 1806; 5th Baron Bergavenny (1695)	Charlotte Walter, later Senior c. 1738–1811; 6th Baroness Bergavenny (1695)	George Nevill; 1727–1785; 1st Earl of Abergavenny, etc., 17th de facto Baron Bergavenny (1392), 2nd Baron Bergavenny (1724)	Edward Nevill b. 1729
Barony Bergavenny (6th creation) abeyant, 1811
John Fane; 1759–1841; 10th Earl of Westmorland, etc.	Henry Nevill; 1755–1843; 2nd Earl of Abergavenny, etc., 18th de facto Baron Bergavenny (1392), 3rd Baron Bergavenny (1724)
John Fane; 1784–1859; 11th Earl of Westmorland, etc.	John Nevill; 1789–1845; 3rd Earl of Abergavenny, etc., 19th de facto Baron Bergavenny (1392), 4th Baron Bergavenny (1724)	William Nevill; 1792–1868; 4th Earl of Abergavenny, etc., 20th de facto Baron Bergavenny (1392), 5th Baron Bergavenny (1724)
Marquess of Abergavenny and Earl of Lewes, 1876
Francis William Henry Fane; 1825–1891; 12th Earl of Westmorland, etc.	William Nevill; 1826–1915; 1st Marquess of Abergavenny, etc., 5th Earl of Abergavenny, etc., 21st de facto Baron Bergavenny (1392), 6th Baron Bergavenny (1724)	Caroline Emily Nevill; 1829–1887	Henrietta Augusta Nevill; 1830–1912	Ralph Pelham Nevill; 1832–1914
Anthony Mildmay Julian Fane; 1859–1922; 13th Earl of Westmorland, etc.	Reginald William Bransby Nevill; 1853–1927; 2nd Marquess of Abergavenny, etc., 6th Earl of Abergavenny, etc., 22th de facto Baron Bergavenny (1392), 7th Baron Bergavenny (1724)	Henry Gilbert Ralph Nevill; 1854–1938; 3rd Marquess of Abergavenny, etc., 7th Earl of Abergavenny, etc., 23rd de facto Baron Bergavenny (1392), 8th Baron Bergavenny (1724)	George Montacute Nevill; 1856–1920	William Beauchamp Nevill; 1860–1939	Richard Plantagenet Nevill; 1862–1939	Percy Llewelyn Nevill; 1877–1927
Barony Bergavenny (6th and 7th creations) abeyant, 1938
Vere Anthony Francis Fane; 1893–1948; 14th Earl of Westmorland, etc.	Guy Temple Montacute Larnach-Nevill; 1883–1954; 4th Marquess of Abergavenny, etc., 8th Earl of Abergavenny, etc.
David Anthony Thomas Fane; 1924–1993; 15th Earl of Westmorland, etc.	John Henry Guy Nevill; 1914–2000; 5th Marquess of Abergavenny, etc., 9th Earl of Abergavenny, etc.	Rupert Charles Montecute Nevill; 1923–1982	Michael George Ralph Nevill; 1917–1943
Anthony David Francis Henry Fane b. 1951; 16th Earl of Westmorland, etc.	Harry St. Clair Fane; 1953–2023 styled Lord Burghersh	Christopher George Charles Nevill b. 1955; 6th Marquess of Abergavenny, etc., 10th Earl of Abergavenny, etc.	David Michael Ralph Nevill; 1941-2025	Michael George Rathmore Nevill b. 1943
Daisy Caroline Fane b. 1989	Sam Michael David Fane b. 1989	Guy Michael Rossmore Nevill b. 1973
Heir presumptive to the Earldom of Westmorland	Heir presumptive to the Earldom of Abergavenny
George David Roland Nevill b. 2010	Frederick Guy James Nevill b. 2012	Ralph William James Nevill b. 2015

== Coats of arms ==
See Category:Neville arms

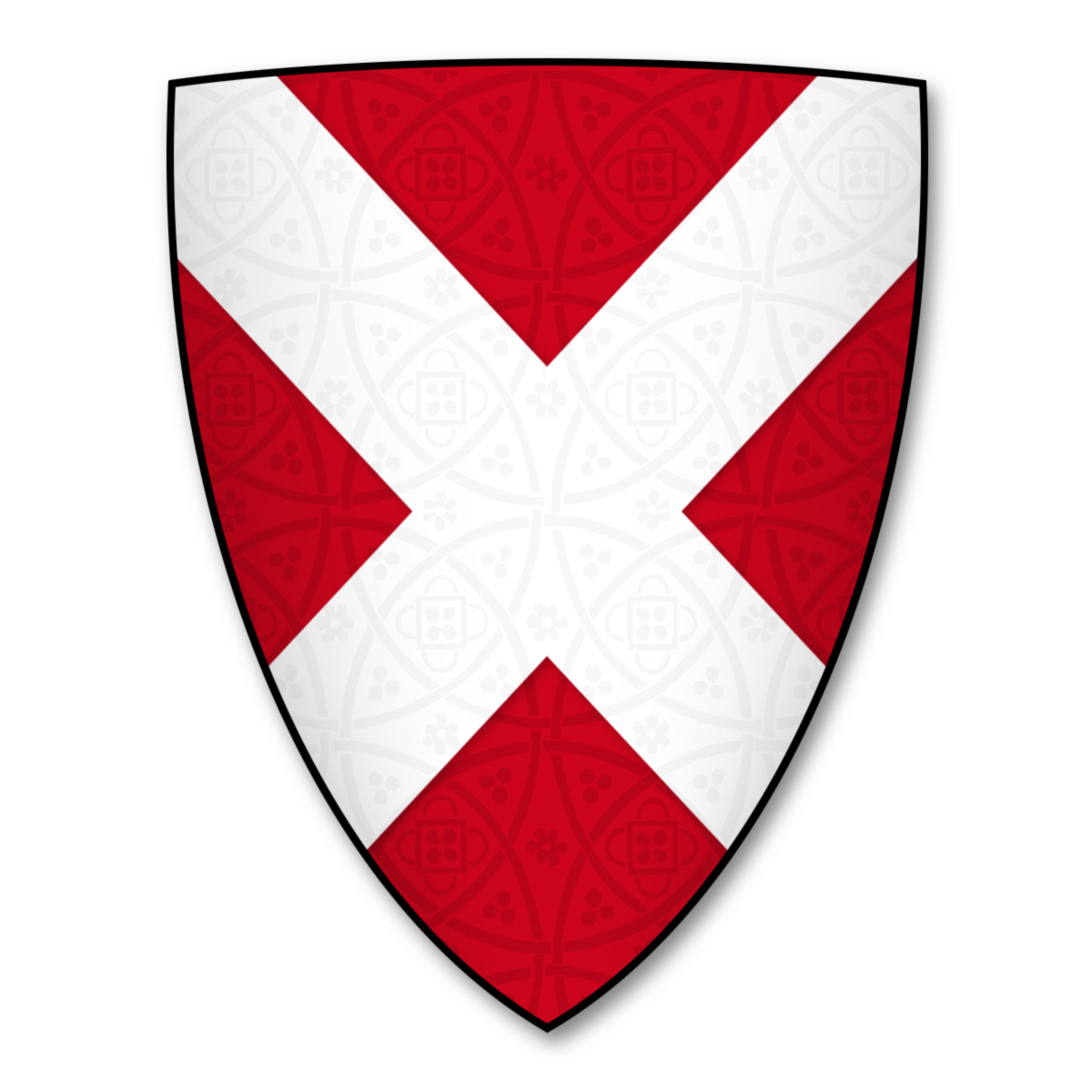
Neville arms on old-style shield

Neville, Earls of Westmorland, and Barons Neville of Raby

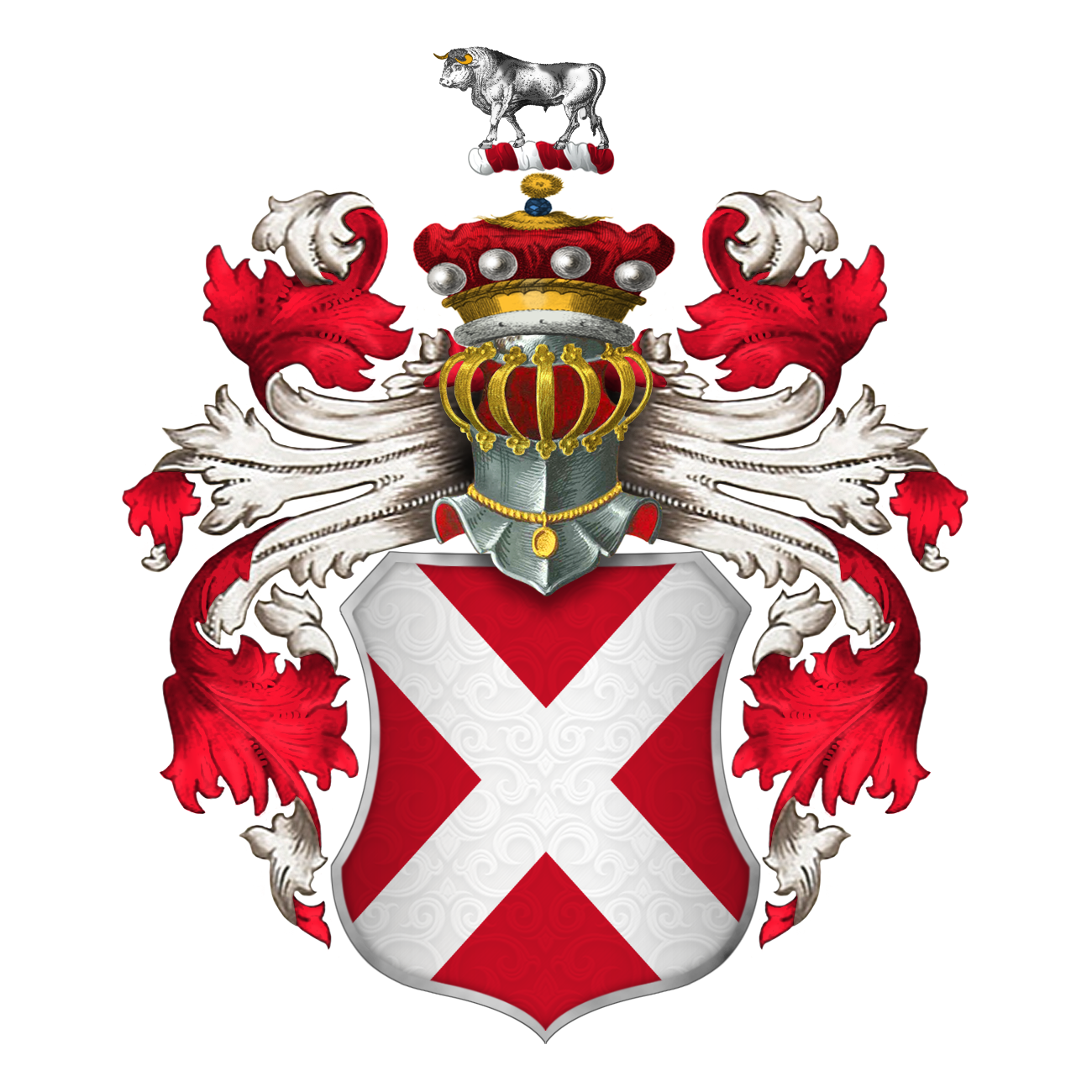
Neville, Barons of Raby

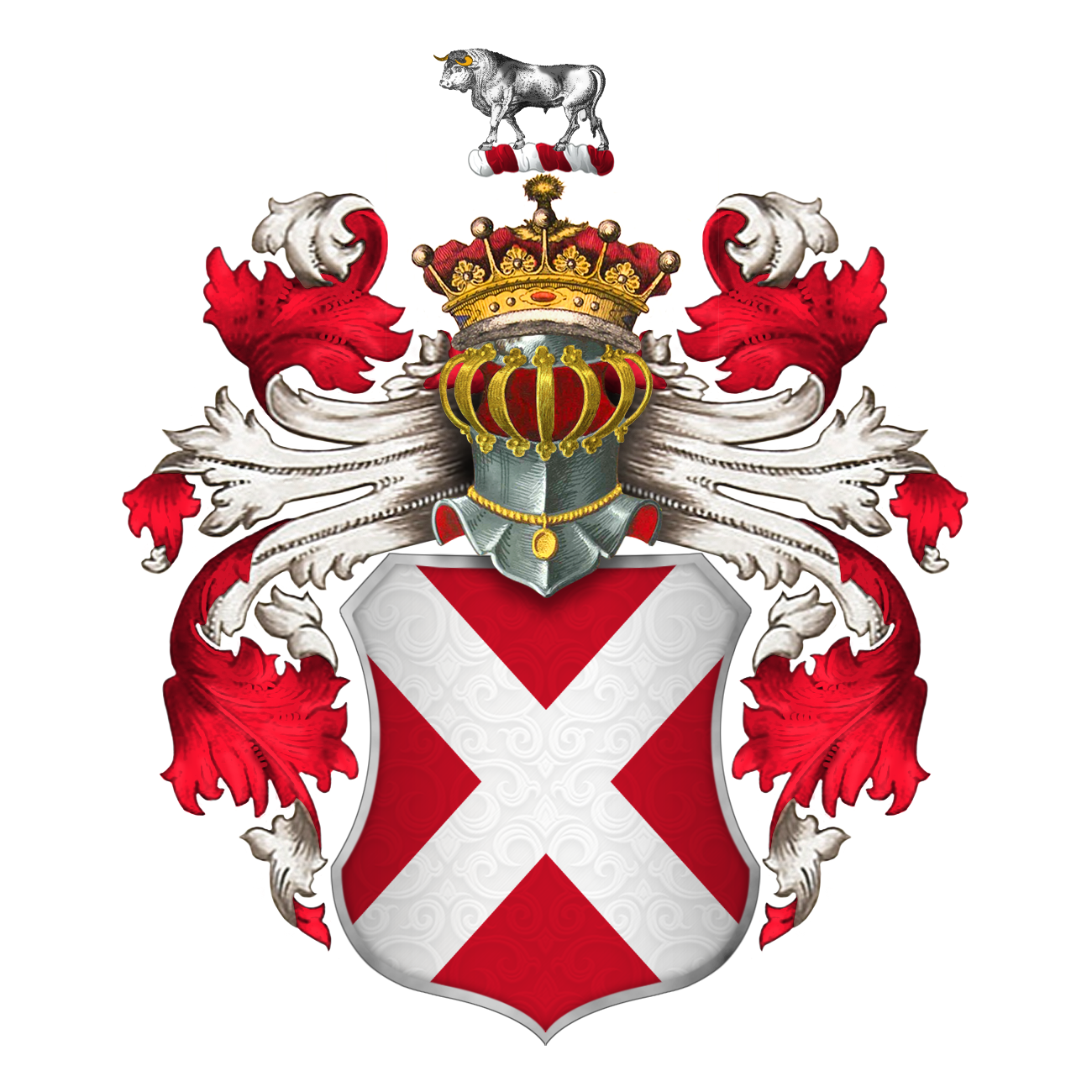
Neville, Earls of Westmorland

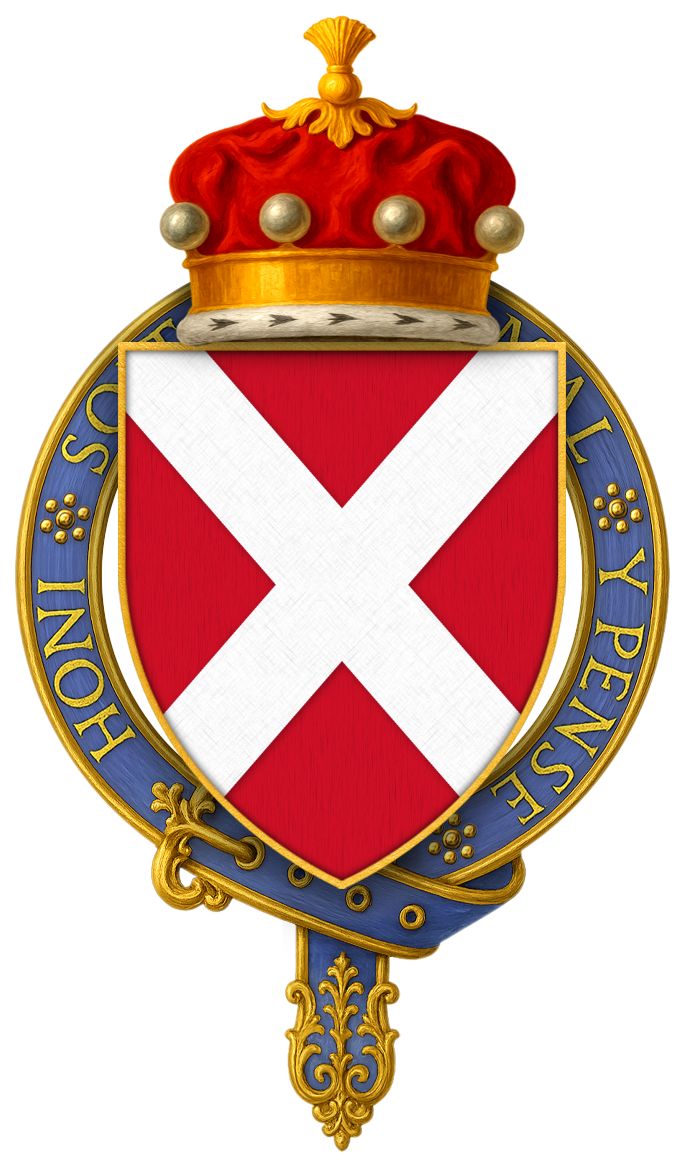
Sir John Neville, 3rd Baron Neville de Raby, KG

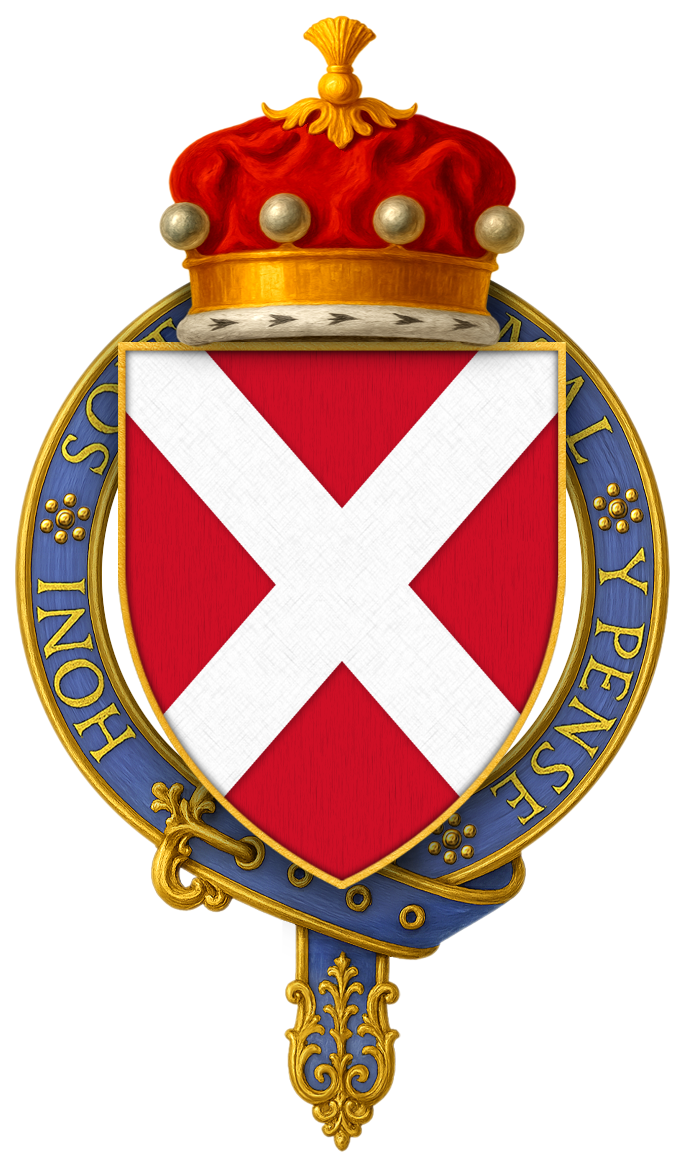
Sir Ralph Neville, 4th Baron Neville de Raby, KG

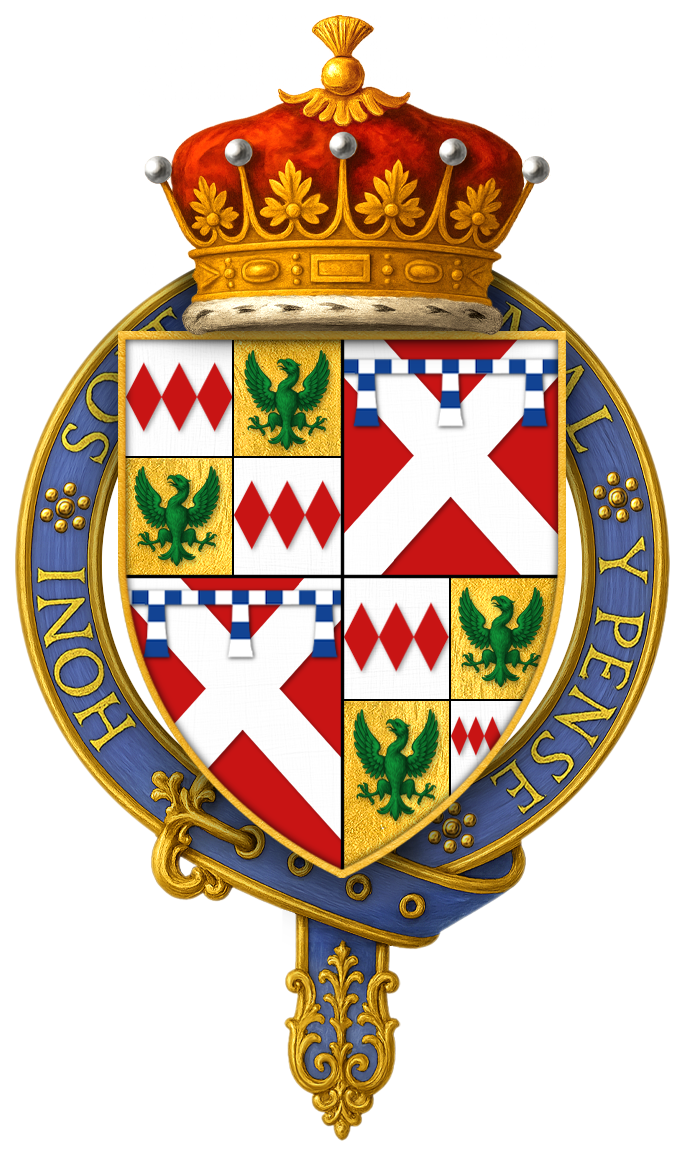
Sir Richard Neville, 5th Earl of Salisbury, KG

Arms of Richard Neville, 16th Earl of Warwick, the "Kingmaker"

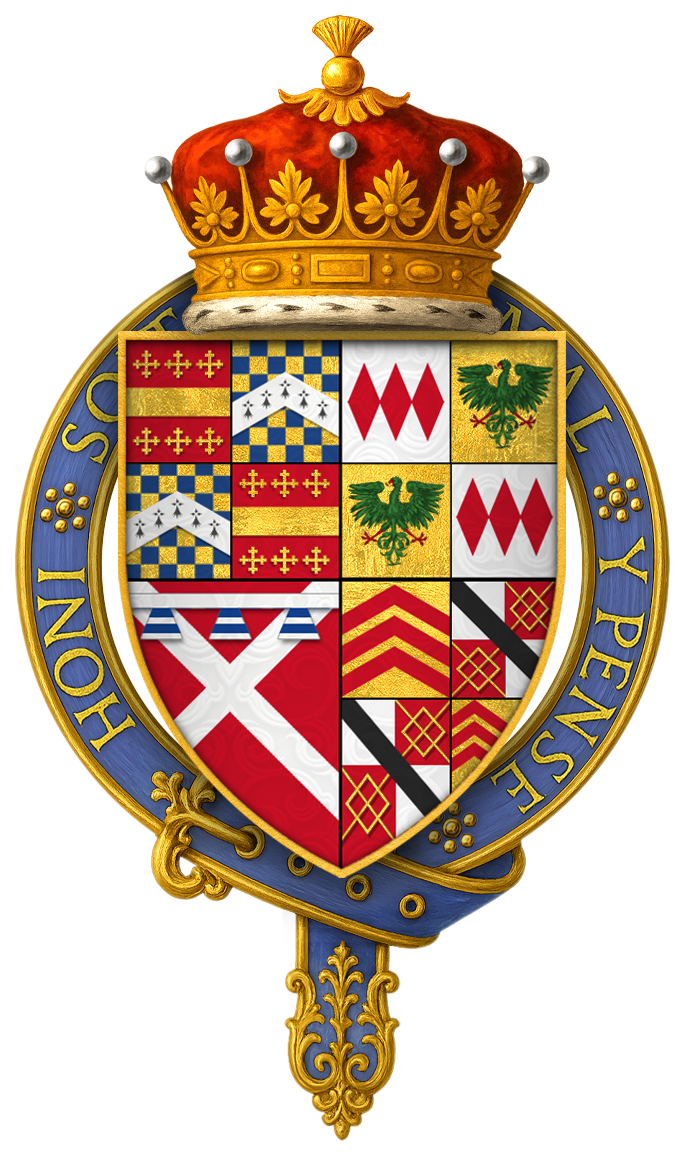
Garter Arms of Sir Richard Neville, 16th Earl of Warwick

Arms of Isabel Neville, Duchess of Clarence

Arms of Anne Neville as Queen of England

Arms of Anne Neville as Queen of England (simple)

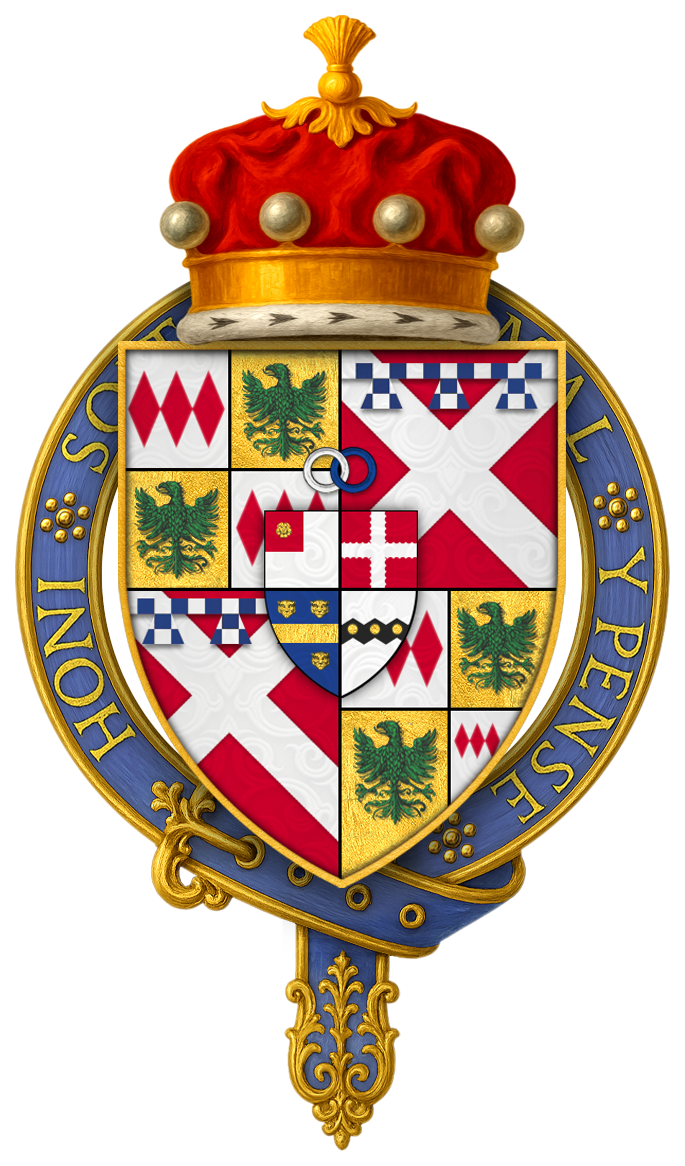
Sir John Nevill, 1st Baron Montagu, KG, later Marquis of Montagu

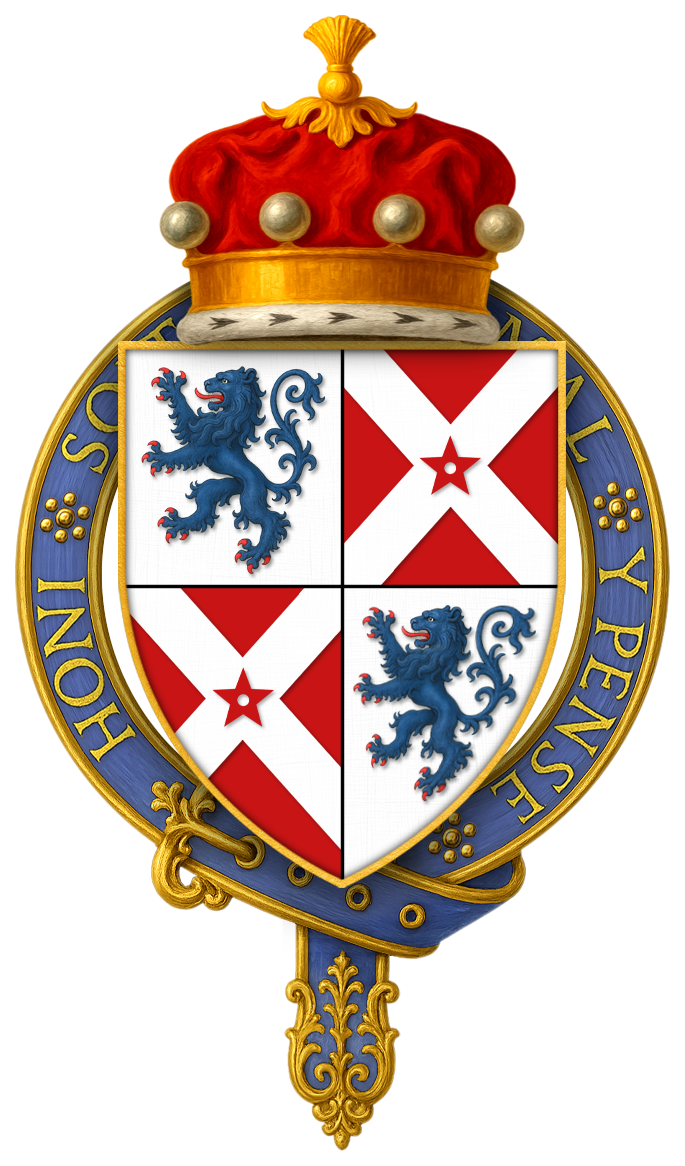
Sir William Nevill, 6th Baron Fauconberg, KG

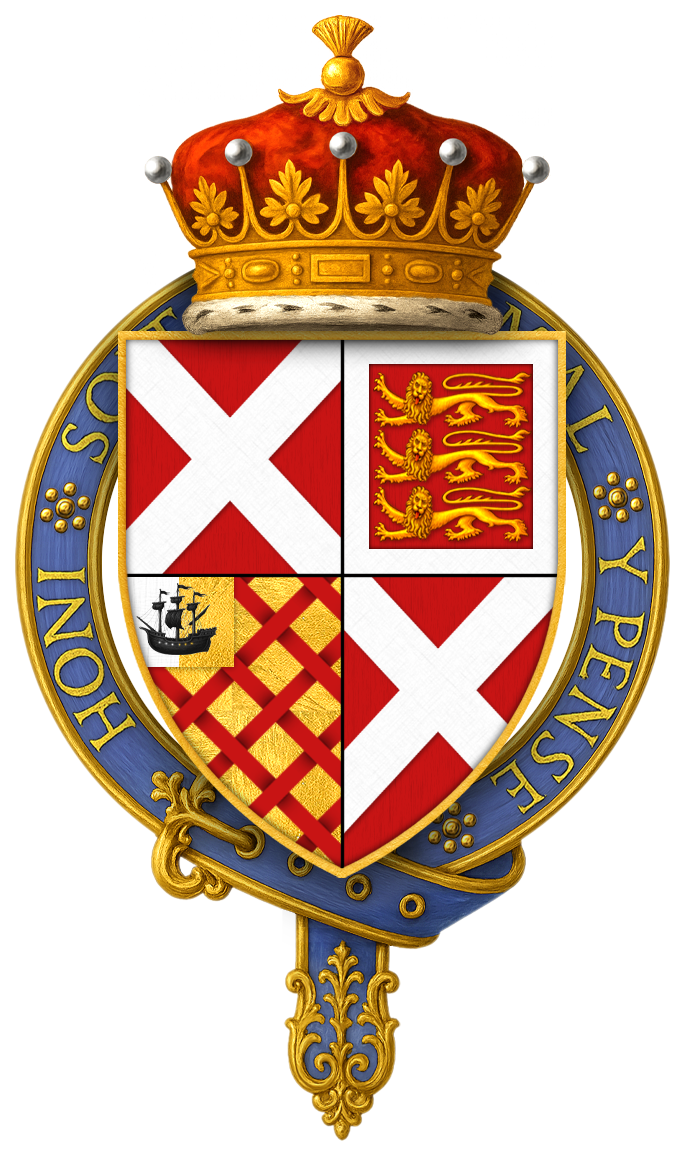
Coat of arms of Sir Ralph Neville, 4th Earl of Westmorland, KG

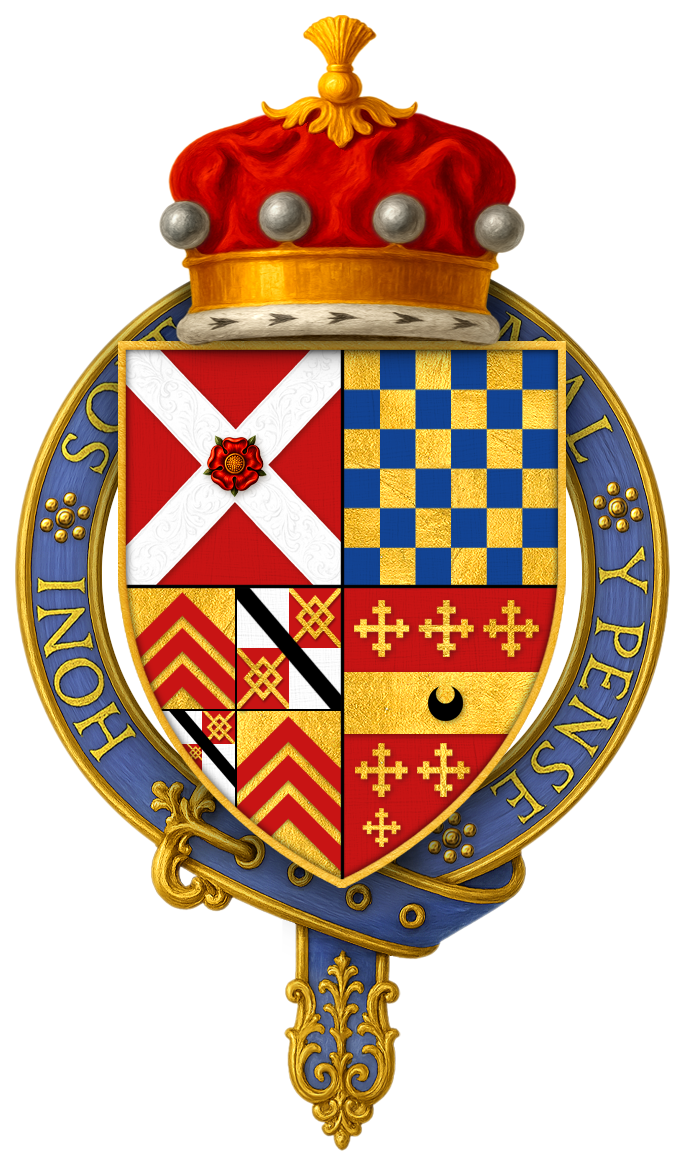
Sir George Nevill, 5th Baron Bergavenny, KG

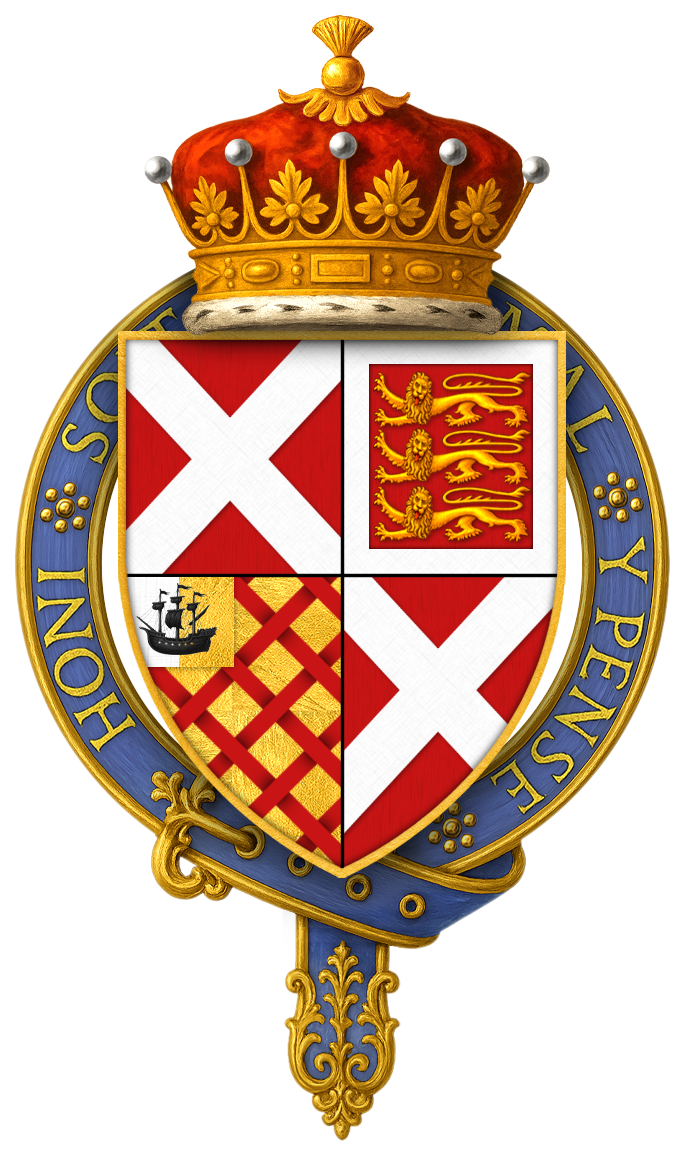
Sir Henry Neville, 5th Earl of Westmorland, KG

Marquess of Abergavenny, Earl of Abergavenny, Barons Bergavenny

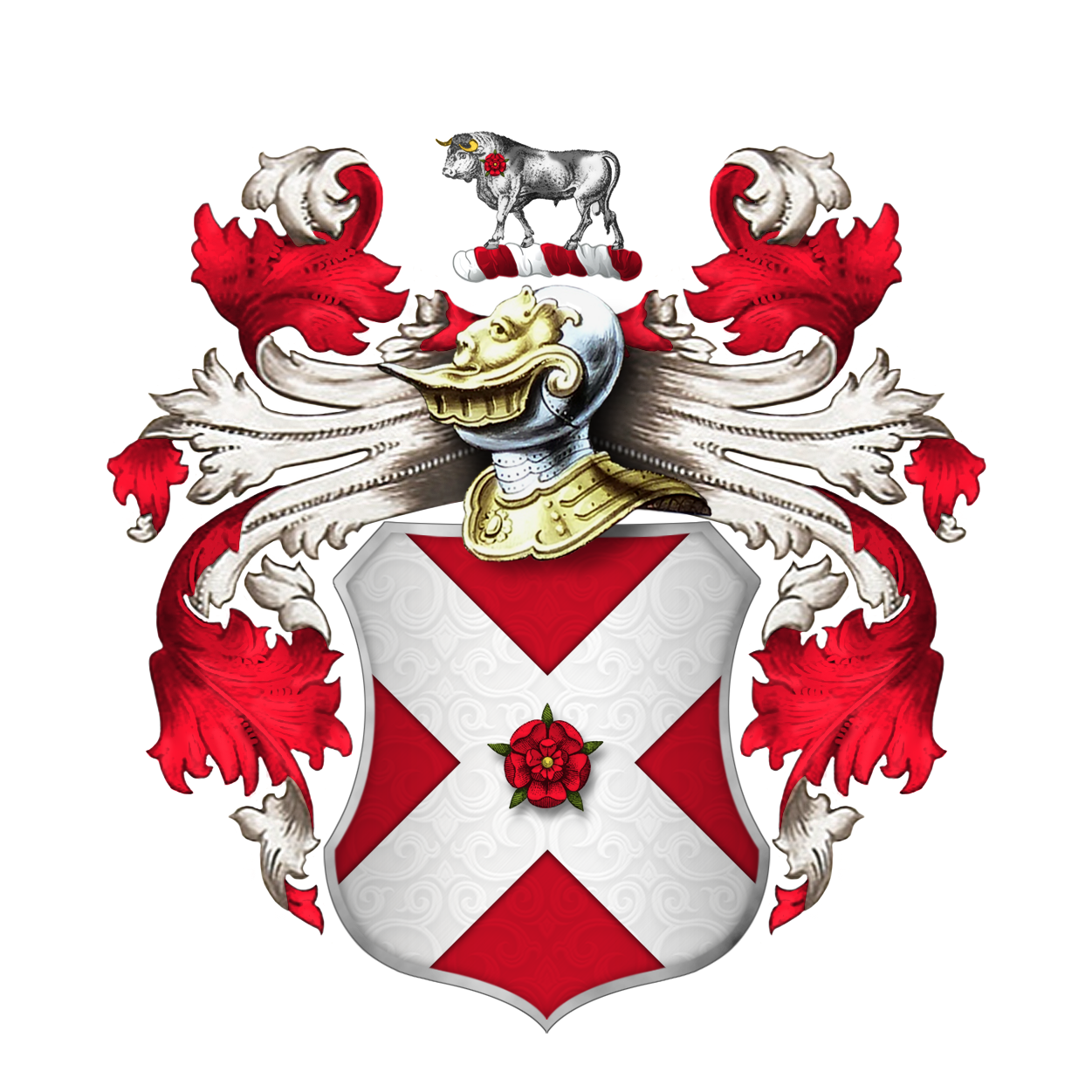
Neville, of Abergavenny, Monmouthshire, Wales

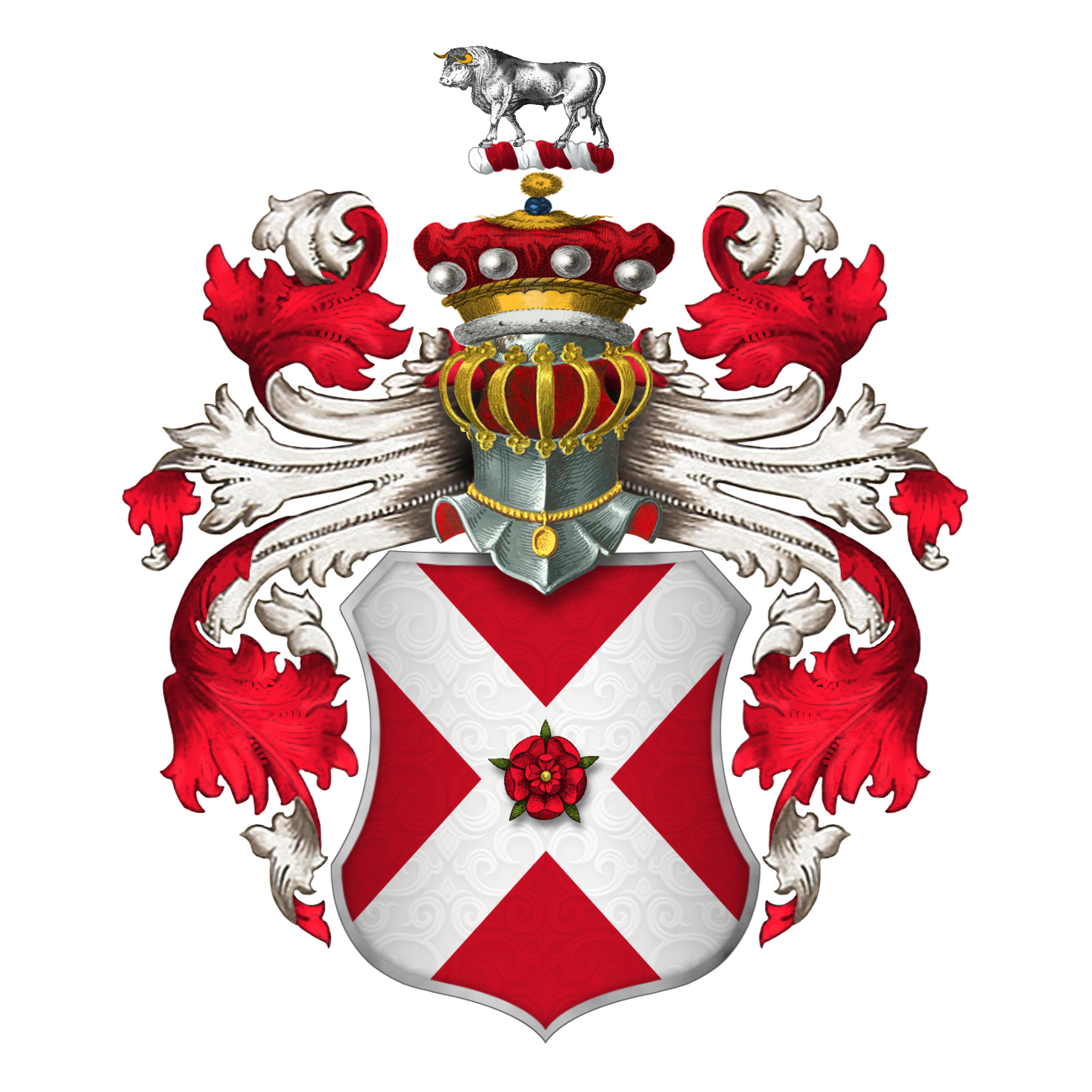
Neville, Barons Bergavenny

== Sources ==
- Collins, Arthur (1982). Peerage of England, Volume 5. F. C. and J. Rivington. p. 151. "crinan neville."
- Given-Wilson, Chris, The English Nobility in the Late Middle Ages: The Fourteenth-Century Political Community (London and New York 1987)
- Hicks, Michael, The Wars of the Roses (New Haven and London 2010)
- Jewell, H. M. (2004), "Neville, Sir Robert de (d. 1282), baron", Oxford Dictionary of National Biography (online ed.), Oxford: Oxford University Press, doi:10.1093/ref:odnb/19961, ISBN 978-0-19-861412-8 (Subscription, Wikipedia Library access or UK public library membership required.)
- Offler, Hilary S., Durham Episcopal Charters 1071-1152 (Gateshead 1968)
- Offler, Hilary S., 'FitzMeldred, Neville and Hansard', North of the Tees - studies in medieval British history (Aldershot 1996), XIII
- Round, John H., Feudal England - historical studies on the eleventh and twelfth centuries (London 1895, 3rd ed. London 1964)
- Wagner, Anthony (1961). English Ancestry. Oxford University Press.
- Wagner, Anthony, Pedigree and Progress - essays in the genealogical interpretation of history (London and Chichester 1975)
- Wagner, Anthony (2001). Encyclopedia of the Wars of the Roses. ABC CLIO. ISBN 1-85109-358-3.
- Young, Charles R., The Making of the Neville Family in England 1166-1400 (Woodbridge 1996)
