= Edward Nevill, 7th Baron Bergavenny =

Edward Neville
- Baron Bergavenny
- Born: 1526
- Died: 10 February 1588 (aged 61–62)
- Noble family: House of Neville
- Spouses: Katharine Brome; Grisold Hughes
- Issue: Edward Nevill, 8th Baron Bergavenny; Francis Nevill; George Nevill; Henry Nevill; Margaret Nevill; Grisel Nevill; Mary Nevill
- Father: Sir Edward Neville
- Mother: Eleanor Windsor

Edward Nevill, de facto 7th Baron Bergavenny (c. 1526 – 10 February 1588) was a de facto English peer.

The son of Sir Edward Nevill, he was considered to have succeeded to the Barony upon the death of Henry Nevill, 6th Baron Bergavenny, his first cousin, although by modern doctrine he did not hold that title, as it should have descended to the heir general, the 6th Baron's daughter Mary, Lady Fane. His right to the title was contested by his cousin Mary, Lady Fane, who claimed to be heir general of her father, the 6th Baron. The dispute continued many years.

He married Katherine Brome, with whom he had the following children:

- Edward Nevill, 8th Baron Bergavenny (c. 1550 – 1622)
- Francis Nevill
- George Nevill
- Henry Nevill
- Margaret Nevill
- Grisel Nevill, married Sir Henry Poole
- Mary Nevill

He later married Grisold Hughes.

Peerage of England
Preceded by Henry Nevill	Baron Bergavenny; 1587–1588/89	Succeeded by Edward Nevill
