= Henrietta Nevill, Baroness Bergavenny =

The Right Honourable The Lady Bergavenny
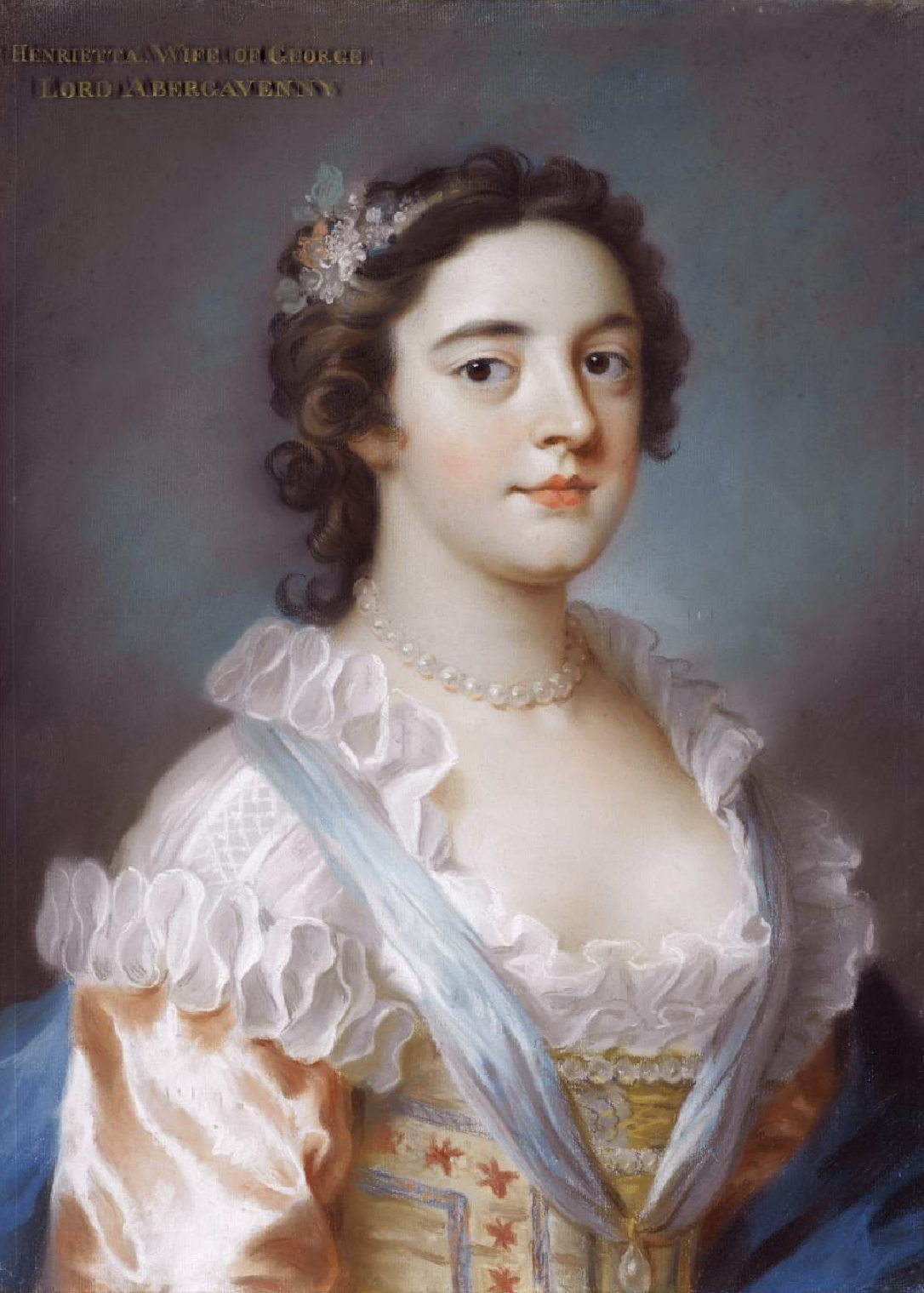
- Henrietta Nevill, Baroness Bergavenny, by William Hoare
- Born: 1 August 1730
- Died: 31 August 1768 (Age 38)
- Father: Thomas Pelham
- Relatives: Thomas Pelham, 1st Earl of Chichester (brother)

Henrietta Nevill, Baroness Bergavenny (1 August 1730 – 31 August 1768), née Henrietta Pelham, was the wife of George Nevill, 1st Earl of Abergavenny.

Henrietta was the daughter of Thomas Pelham of Stanmer and his wife, Annetta Bridges. Henrietta's brother was Thomas Pelham, 1st Earl of Chichester. She was christened at St Anne's, Westminster, London.

Henrietta's first husband was Hon. Richard Temple, son of Henry Temple, 1st Viscount Palmerston, whom she married in 1748; he died of smallpox in the following year. They had no children.

Four years later, on 5 February 1753, she married George Nevill, then 15th Baron Bergavenny. Their children were:

- Henry Nevill (1755–1843)
- Lady Henrietta Nevill (1756-1833), who married Sir John Berney, 7th Baronet. Their son was Sir Hanson Berney, 8th Baronet.
- Rev George Henry Nevill (1760-1844), who married Caroline Walpole and had three sons and a daughter

Henrietta died at the age of 38 and was buried at East Grinstead. After her death, in 1784, her husband was raised to the earldom of Abergavenny, thus she never held the title of countess though she is sometimes referred to as such.
