= George Nevill, 1st Earl of Abergavenny =

English peer

The Right Honourable The Earl of Abergavenny
- Born: 24 June 1727
- Died: 9 September 1785 (aged 58)
- Noble family: House of Neville
- Spouse: Henrietta Pelham
- Issue: Henry Nevill, 2nd Earl of Abergavenny; Lady Henrietta Nevill; Rev. Hon. George Henry Nevill
- Father: William Nevill, 16th Baron Bergavenny
- Mother: Katharine Tatton

George Nevill, 1st Earl of Abergavenny (24 June 1727 – 9 September 1785), known as Lord Bergavenny from 1744 to 1784, was an English peer. He married into a branch of the Pelham family seated at Stanmer and briefly held office as Lord Lieutenant of Sussex. Created an earl in 1784, he died the following year.

He was born on 24 June 1727 at Kidbrooke Park in Forest Row, the oldest son of William Nevill, 16th Baron Bergavenny, and his wife Katharine Tatton. George was baptised at St Margaret's, Westminster on 14 July 1727, with King George II as his godfather. He succeeded his father as Baron Bergavenny on 21 September 1744, and matriculated at Christ Church, Oxford on 21 February 1744/5.

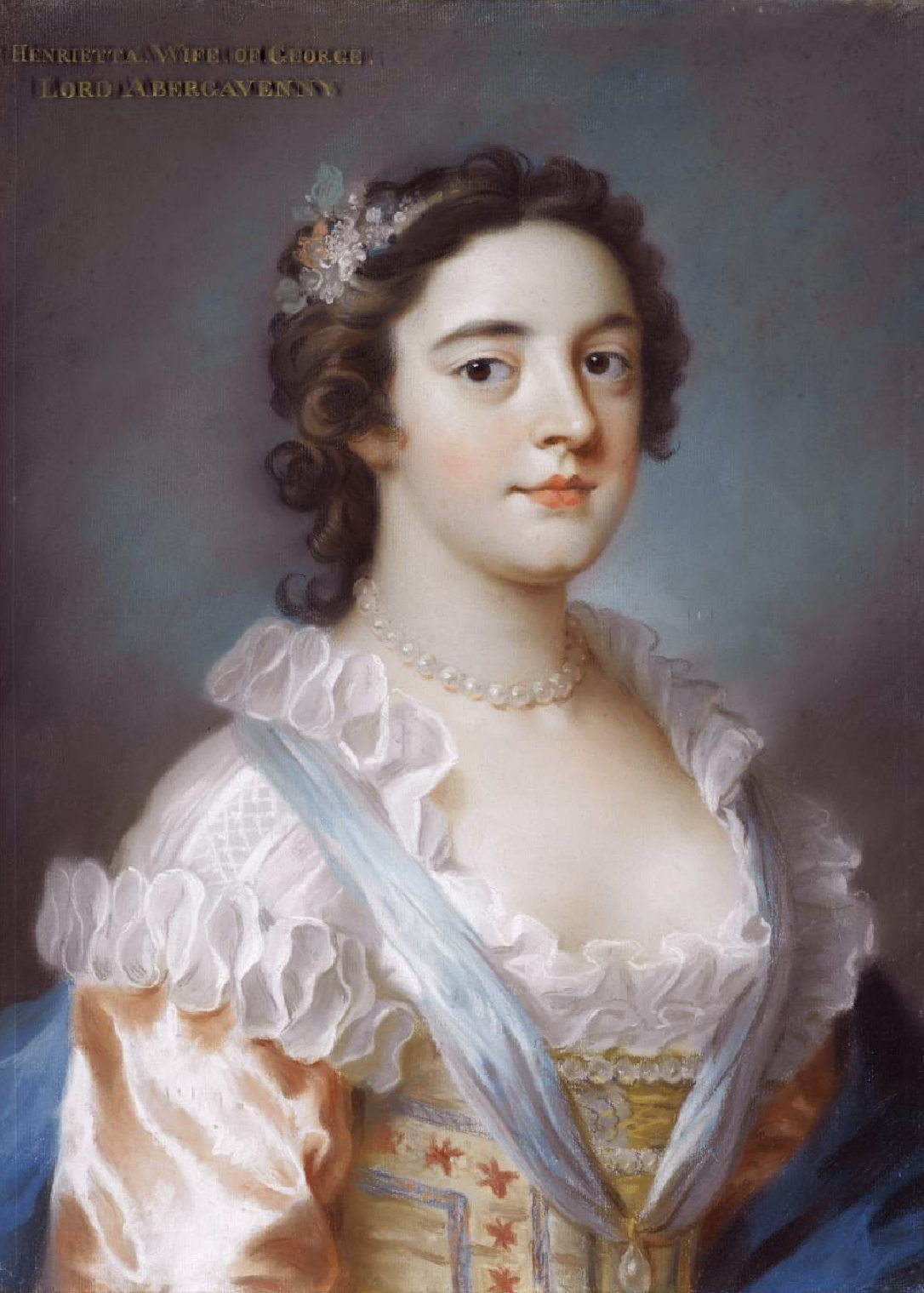
Henrietta Pelham married Hon. Richard Temple M.P. (c. 1726–1749) in 1748, but he died of smallpox. Four years later she married the Baron Bergavenny. (William Hoare of Bath)

On 5 February 1753, he married Henrietta Pelham, daughter of Thomas Pelham (d. 1737), at Stanmer. She was the widow of Hon. Richard Temple. They had three children:

- Henry Nevill, 2nd Earl of Abergavenny (1755–1843)
- Lady Henrietta Nevill (24 May 1756 – 2 April 1833), married Sir John Berney, 7th Baronet and had issue
- Rev. Hon. George Henry Nevill (6 September 1760 – 7 August 1844), matriculated on 11 May 1787 at Christ Church, Oxford, married Caroline Walpole, daughter of Hon. Richard Walpole and had the following issue:
      - Catherine Caroline (5 August 1789 – 23 January 1794)
      - Rev George (16 March 1792 – 20 September 1825)
      - Rev Henry Walpole(b. 10 November 1803) Married 28 May 1833, Frances Bart, youngest daughter of Sir Edmund Bacon Bart.
      - Reginald Henry (b. 14 September 1807)

Bergavenny was appointed Lord Lieutenant of Sussex in July 1757 but resigned the post in July 1761. On 17 May 1784, he was created Earl of Abergavenny and Viscount Nevill. He died on 9 September 1785 and was buried at East Grinstead. The Earl was succeeded by his son, Henry Nevill, 2nd Earl of Abergavenny.

== Arms ==
Coat of arms of George Nevill, 1st Earl of Abergavenny
Crest Out of a ducal coronet or, a bull's head argent pied sable, armed gold, and charged on the neck with a rose gules barbed and seeded proper. Escutcheon Quarterly, 1st and 4th, Gules, on a saltire argent a rose of the field, barbed and seeded proper (Nevill of Raby); 2nd and 3rd, Or, fretty gules, on a canton per pale ermine and or, a galley sable (Nevill of Bulmer). Supporters Two bulls argent pied sable, armed, unguled, collared and chained, and at the end of the chain two staples, or. Motto Ne vile velis (Form no mean wish). Badge Dexter, A rose gules, barbed and seeded proper; Sinister, A portcullis or.

== Notes ==
Honorary titles
Preceded by The Earl of Ashburnham	Lord Lieutenant of Sussex; 1757–1761	Succeeded by The Duke of Newcastle-upon-Tyne
Peerage of Great Britain
New creation	Earl of Abergavenny; 1784–1785	Succeeded by Henry Nevill
Peerage of England
Preceded by William Nevill	Baron Bergavenny; 1744–1785	Succeeded by Henry Nevill
