= George Nevill, 11th Baron Bergavenny =

English peer

George Neville
- Baron Bergavenny
- Born: c. 1615
- Died: 2 June 1666
- Noble family: House of Neville
- Spouse: Mary Gifford
- Issue: George Nevill, 12th Baron Bergavenny; Bridget Nevill
- Father: Henry Nevill, 9th Baron Bergavenny
- Mother: Catherine Vaux

George Nevill, de facto 11th Baron Bergavenny (c.1615 – 2 June 1666) was a de facto English peer.

The younger son of Henry Nevill, 9th Baron Bergavenny and his second wife Catherine Vaux, he succeeded to the Barony upon the death of his brother, John Nevill, 10th Baron Bergavenny, who had died without male issue.

He married Mary Gifford, daughter of Thomas Gifford and Anne Brooksby, and they had the following children:

- George Nevill, 12th Baron Bergavenny (1665–1695)
- Bridget Nevill (b. bef. 1666), who married Sir John Shelley, 3rd Baronet (her mother's stepson) and had issue.

Lady Abergavenny later married Sir Charles Shelley. She died in 1699 and is buried in Old St Pancras Churchyard

Peerage of England
Preceded by John Nevill	Baron Bergavenny; 1662–1666	Succeeded by George Nevill
