= George Nevill, 12th Baron Bergavenny =

English noble

George Neville
- Baron Bergavenny
- Born: 21 April 1665
- Died: 26 March 1695 (aged 29)
- Noble family: House of Neville
- Spouse: Honora Belasyse
- Father: George Nevill, 11th Baron Bergavenny
- Mother: Mary Gifford

George Nevill, de facto 12th (de jure 1st) Baron Bergavenny (21 April 1665 – 26 March 1695) was an English peer.

The son of George Nevill, 11th Baron Bergavenny and Mary Gifford, daughter of Thomas Gifford and Anne Brooksby, he succeeded to the Barony upon the death of his father.

He was raised by his widowed mother, who remarried Sir Charles Shelley, 2nd Baronet; Shelley died in 1681. George came from an openly recusant family on both sides.

During the Popish Plot, given the long imprisonment of the "Five Catholic Lords" on fabricated charges of treason, and the fact that George was closely related to the Vaux and Brooksby families, who had been deeply implicated in the Gunpowder Plot, his mother understandably became concerned about his safety, and in 1678 she took him to live abroad for a time. She was no doubt also concerned for her own safety, as the House of Lords had questioned her servants about her allegedly treasonable dealings. To her dismay, when she pleaded that due to the privilege of peerage her servants were not answerable to any Court, the Lords, in defiance of all the precedents, ruled that privilege of peerage did not extend to recusants.

George married Honora Belasyse, daughter of John Belasyse, 1st Baron Belasyse and his third wife Lady Anne Paulet.

He died on 26 March 1695. His mother, who had outlived her son and two husbands, died in 1699.

As he died without issue, the Barony passed to his 2nd cousin once removed, also named George Nevill.

Peerage of the United Kingdom
Preceded by George Nevill	Baron Bergavenny; 1666–1695	Succeeded by George Nevill
