= Geoffrey de Neville (died 1193) =

Feudal baron of Ashby in Lincolnshire (died 1193)

Arms of Neville of Ashby ("Neville ancient"): Or fretty gules, on a canton per pale ermine and the first a ship with three masts sable. Adopted at the start of the age of heraldry, circa 1200–1215

Geoffrey de Neville (died 1193) was the 2nd feudal baron of Ashby in Lincolnshire.

== Origins ==
Geoffrey was the son and heir of Gilbert de Neville (d.1166/9), the first feudal baron of Ashby, to whom King Henry II had granted the manors of Ashby and Toynton in 1162. Gilbert's lands were valued at £15 per annum and were held by military service of one knight.

== Marriage and children ==
At some time before 1176 Geoffrey married (as her second husband) Emma de Bulmer, widow of Geoffrey de Valognes, daughter of Bertram de Bulmer and heiress of her brother William de Bulmer. Emma's father held 3 1/5 knight's fees and in the mid-twelfth century his estate was the joint largest in the "dominion of Saint Cuthbert" (i.e. County Durham). She brought to her husband several estates, including Brancepeth Castle (built by the Bulmer family) in County Durham and Sheriff Hutton Castle (built by Bertram de Bulmer, near Bulmer, the original seat of the family), Raskelf and Sutton-in-the-Forest, all in Yorkshire.

Emma and Geoffrey had the following children:

- Henry de Neville, son and heir, who married but died childless when his sole heir became his sister Isabel.

Arms of FitzMaldred ("Neville modern"): Gules, a saltire argent

- Isabel de Neville, sister and heiress of her brother, who married firstly Robert FitzMaldred of Raby Castle, Staindrop in County Durham. She is believed to be represented by one of the surviving female effigies in Staindrop Church. Their children adopted her surname in lieu of their patronymic. She married secondly Gilbert de Brakenberg.
