= John Nevill, 10th Baron Bergavenny =

English peer

John Neville
- Baron Bergavenny
- Born: 1614
- Died: 23 October 1662 (aged 47–48)
- Noble family: House of Neville
- Spouse: Elizabeth Chamberlaine
- Father: Henry Nevill, 9th Baron Bergavenny
- Mother: Catherine Vaux

John Nevill, de facto 10th (de jure 3rd) Baron Bergavenny (c. 1614 – 23 October 1662) was an English peer.

The son of Henry Nevill, 9th Baron Bergavenny and his second wife Catherine Vaux, he succeeded to the Barony upon his father's death.

He married Elizabeth Chamberlaine, daughter of John Chamberlaine of Shirburn Castle, Oxfordshire.

He died on 23 October 1662. As he died without issue, the Barony passed to his younger brother. In the following year, his elder half-sister Anne Neville who was a senior nun in Ghent came to England to collect the convent's debts. She stayed for four years and stayed some of the time with the dowager Elizabeth.

Peerage of England
Preceded by Henry Nevill	Baron Bergavenny; 1641–1662	Succeeded by George Nevill
