= George Nevill, 13th Baron Bergavenny =

George Neville
- Baron Bergavenny
- Born: 1659
- Died: 11 March 1720 (aged 60–61)
- Noble family: House of Neville
- Spouse: Anne Walker
- Issue: Henry Neville; George Nevill, 14th Baron Bergavenny; Hon. Jane Neville; Edward Nevill, 15th Baron Bergavenny; Hon. Ann Neville
- Father: George Neville, great-grandson of Edward Nevill, 8th Baron Bergavenny
- Mother: Mary Whitelocke

George Nevill, de facto 13th (de jure 1st) Baron Bergavenny (c.1659 – 11 March 1720/21) was an English peer.

The son of George Nevill and Mary, daughter of the Roundhead Bulstrode Whitelocke and his second wife Frances Willoughby, he succeeded to the Barony upon the death of the 12th Baron, a distant cousin also called George.

He married Anne Walker, daughter of Captain Nehemiah Walker, on 22 October 1698, and they had the following children:

- Hon. Henry Nevill (bef. 1702 – c. 1710)
- George Nevill, 14th Baron Bergavenny (1702–1723)
- Hon. Jane Nevill (1703–1786)
- Edward Nevill, 15th Baron Bergavenny (1705–1724)
- Hon. Anne Nevill (1715–1736/37)

The marriage was evidently unhappy and the couple separated in 1712. After his death Anne remarried John West, 1st Earl De La Warr. She died in 1748.

Peerage of England
Preceded by George Nevill	Baron Bergavenny; 1695–1720/21	Succeeded by George Nevill
