= William Nevill, 4th Earl of Abergavenny =

British peer and clergyman

The Earl of Abergavenny
- Born: 28 June 1792
- Died: 17 August 1868 (aged 76)
- Noble family: House of Neville
- Spouse: Caroline Leeke
- Issue: William Nevill, 1st Marquess of Abergavenny; Lady Caroline Emily Nevill; Lady Henrietta Augusta Nevill; Lady Isabel Mary Frances Nevill; Hon Ralph Pelham Nevill
- Father: Henry Nevill, 2nd Earl of Abergavenny
- Mother: Mary Robinson

William Nevill, 4th Earl of Abergavenny (28 June 1792 – 17 August 1868), styled Hon. William Nevill until 1845, was a British peer and clergyman. The fourth son of Henry Nevill, 2nd Earl of Abergavenny, he was ordained in 1816 and occupied two of the family livings until 1844. He succeeded his brother as Earl of Abergavenny the following year.

== Career ==
Nevill was born on 28 June 1792, the fourth son of Henry Neville, 2nd Earl of Abergavenny, and his wife Mary Robinson. He was baptised on 2 August 1792 at Isleworth, Middlesex. Nevill was educated at Uckfield, matriculated at Christ Church, Oxford on 22 October 1812, and was admitted fellow-commoner at Magdalene College, Cambridge on 29 March 1816, receiving his MA the same year. He was ordained as a deacon on 21 July 1816. On 1 November 1816, he was appointed rector (Note: CCED calls him the vicar, but all other sources seem to refer to his as the rector.) of the family living of Birling, Kent, and on 23 September 1818, to the vicarage of Frant, Sussex, which his elder brother John had vacated for him. (Note: Cokayne and others report that he was chaplain to King William IV, but his name does not appear in Bucholz's list of chaplains in the royal household.) He resigned his livings in 1844 and succeeded his unmarried elder brother, John, as Earl of Abergavenny in 1845.

== Family ==
He married Caroline Leeke (d. 9 May 1873) on 15 September 1824, daughter of Ralph Leeke of Longford Hall, Shropshire, and they had the following children:

- William Nevill, 1st Marquess of Abergavenny (1826–1915)
- Lady Caroline Emily Nevill (1829–1887), an early photographer
- Lady Henrietta Augusta Nevill (1830–1912), philanthropist and artist, married on 10 July 1855 Hon. Thomas Lloyd-Mostyn and had issue
- Lady Isabel Mary Frances Nevill (1831–1915), married on 23 January 1854 Rev. Hon. Edward Vesey Bligh and had issue
- Hon. Ralph Pelham Nevill (1832–1914), married on 12 July 1860 Louisa Marianne, daughter of Sir Charles Maclean, 9th Baronet, and had issue

Nevill died on 17 August 1868 at Birling Manor, and was buried there on 25 August. He was succeeded in the earldom by his elder son William.

== Arms ==
Coat of arms of William Nevill, 4th Earl of Abergavenny
Crest Out of a ducal coronet or, a bull's head argent pied sable, armed gold, and charged on the neck with a rose gules barbed and seeded proper. Escutcheon Quarterly, 1st and 4th, Gules, on a saltire argent a rose of the field, barbed and seeded proper (Nevill of Raby); 2nd and 3rd, Or, fretty gules, on a canton per pale ermine and or, a galley sable (Nevill of Bulmer). Supporters Two bulls argent pied sable, armed, unguled, collared and chained, and at the end of the chain two staples, or. Motto Ne vile velis (Form no mean wish). Badge Dexter, A rose gules, barbed and seeded proper; Sinister, A portcullis or. Other versions Some sources omit the second and third quarters, and some have for a crest a bull statant, coloured, collared and chained as for the supporters, charged on the shoulder with a rose gules barbed and seeded proper.

== Citations ==
Peerage of Great Britain
Preceded by John Nevill	Earl of Abergavenny; 1845–1868	Succeeded by William Nevill
