= Lady Caroline Nevill =

British photographer (1829–1887)

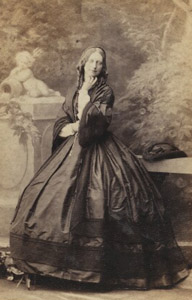
- Lady Caroline Emily Nevill by Camille Silvy
- Born: Caroline Emily Nevill; 31 May 1829; Longford Hall, Shropshire
- Died: 23 February 1887 (aged 57); Belgravia, London, England
- Known for: Photography

Lady Caroline Emily Nevill (31 May 1829 – 23 February 1887) was an early English photographer and member of the noble House of Nevill.

== Personal life ==
Nevill was born at her mother's family seat of Longford Hall, Shropshire, the eldest daughter of Hon. William Nevill, and his wife, Caroline Leeke. Her father was a rector until 1845, when he succeeded his elder brother as Earl of Abergavenny. She had an older brother, William (1826–1915); and two sisters, Henrietta Augusta (1830–1912) and Isabel (1831–1915).

== Photography ==
Lady Caroline and her younger sisters were together known as "The Trio" when they exhibited at the London Photographic Society in 1854. Nevill was introduced to photography by W.J. Thomas, editor of the journal Notes and Queries.

Lady Caroline was a pioneering member of the Photographic Exchange Club (founded 1855) contributing architectural views of Kent from 1855 to 1858. From 1859, she also contributed to the Amateur Photographic Association. She has her portrait made by Camille Silvy, which is now at National Portrait Gallery.

== Personal life ==
Lady Caroline died at her home at 38, Lowndes Square in 1887, aged 57 years.
