= Henry Nevill, 2nd Earl of Abergavenny =

British peer

The Right Honourable The Earl of Abergavenny KT
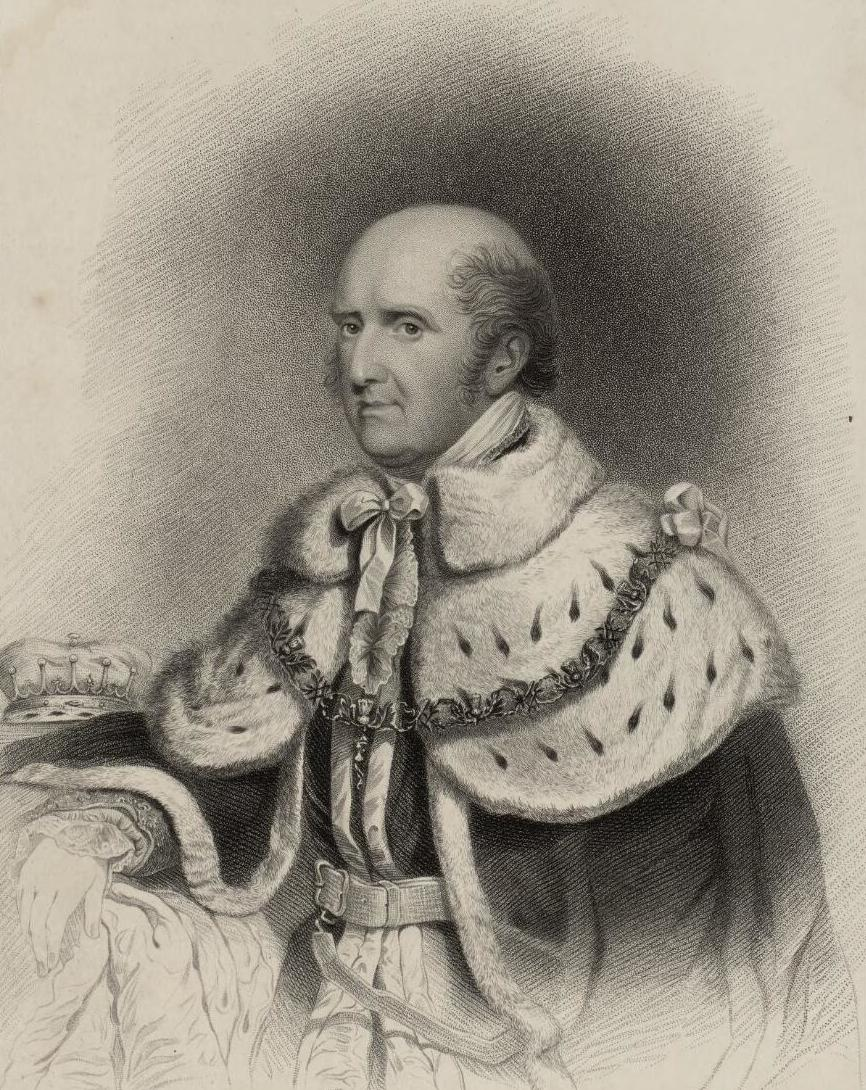
- Born: 22 February 1755
- Died: 27 March 1843 (aged 88)
- Noble family: House of Neville
- Spouse: Mary Robinson
- Issue: Lady Mary Catherine Nevill; Henry George Nevill, Viscount Nevill; Captain Ralph Nevill, Viscount Nevill; Lady Henrietta Nevill; Reverend John Nevill, 3rd Earl of Abergavenny; William Nevill, 4th Earl of Abergavenny
- Father: George Nevill, 1st Earl of Abergavenny
- Mother: Henrietta Pelham

Henry Nevill, 2nd Earl of Abergavenny, KT (22 February 1755 – 27 March 1843) was a British peer, styled Hon. Henry Nevill until 1784 and Viscount Nevill from 1784 to 1785.

The eldest son of George Nevill, 17th Baron Bergavenny and his wife Henrietta Pelham, he was born on 22 February 1755 and baptized on 19 March 1755 at St George's, Hanover Square. Nevill matriculated at Christ Church, Oxford on 29 May 1773, and took his MA from there on 8 March 1776.

He married Mary Robinson (c.1760–1796), daughter of John Robinson, on 3 October 1781, and they had the following children:

- Lady Mary Catherine Nevill (27 February 1783 - 11 July 1807). Married 2 January 1802 Thomas Myers Esq
- Henry George Nevill, Viscount Nevill (22 May 1785 - 8 April 1806)
- Captain Ralph Nevill, Viscount Nevill (21 December 1786 - 19 May 1826). Married 2 February 1813 to Mary-Anne, daughter of Bruce Elclock Esq
- Lady Henrietta Nevill (14 July 1788 - 28 July 1827)
- Reverend John Nevill, 3rd Earl of Abergavenny (1789–1845)
- William Nevill, 4th Earl of Abergavenny (1792–1868)

He considered standing for Monmouthshire at the 1784 election, where one of the sitting Whig members, John Hanbury, was in poor health, but found on consulting Hanbury that the latter intended to stand again. Nevill was also nominated, without his knowledge, as the candidate for Seaford on the Treasury interest and was returned there after a contest, together with Sir Peter Parker, on 30 March 1784. The losing candidates, Lewis Watson and Thomas Alves, were supported by the Pelham family, led by the Duke of Newcastle. Watson petitioned against the election, on the grounds that the bailiff had failed to give four days' notice of the election, and it was declared void on 21 March 1785. In the meantime, Nevill's father was created Earl of Abergavenny on 17 May; as his heir apparent, Henry received the courtesy title of "Viscount Nevill". Hanbury had died abroad in France on 6 April, leaving a vacancy in Monmouthshire. Hanbury's first cousin, John Hanbury Williams (1749-1819) and Nevill both offered themselves as candidates, but Nevill obtained the support of the Henry Somerset, 5th Duke of Beaufort, Lord Lieutenant of Monmouthshire, and the Morgan family of Tredegar, and Hanbury Williams declined to contest it. Once the field was clear, he took the Stewardship of the Chiltern Hundreds to vacate his seat at Seaford and was returned uncontested for Monmouthshire. While he generally followed the lead of his father-in-law, John Robinson in supporting Pitt's administration, he is known to have broken with them on some issues, such as the scrutiny of the Westminster election of 1784. He was not to sit long in the Commons, as he succeeded his father in the Earldom on 9 April 1785.

He was commissioned as major in the Monmouthshire Militia in April 1772, and was promoted to lieutenant-colonel on 5 April 1793 when the combined Monmouth and Brecon Militia was embodied in February 1793 on the outbreak of the French Revolutionary War. In 1795 he objected to the regiment's winter quarters at Devizes as being too cold for Lady Abergavenny, and they were shifted to Lymington, which he found warmer. He resigned on grounds of ill-health in 1805.

Abergavenny also served as Recorder of Harwich. Around 1790, he rebuilt the family's old house at Eridge and made it his principal seat. In 1803 or 1805, having moved to Eridge Castle, he sold his estate at Kidbrooke, near East Grinstead, to Charles Abbot. On 23 May 1814, Abergavenny was created a Knight of the Thistle. He died on 27 March 1843 at Eridge Castle, and was buried on 4 April 1843 at East Grinstead. His two elder sons having predeceased him, without children, he was succeeded by his third son John.

== Arms ==
Coat of arms of Henry Nevill, 2nd Earl of Abergavenny
Crest Out of a ducal coronet or, a bull's head argent pied sable, armed gold, and charged on the neck with a rose gules barbed and seeded proper. Escutcheon Quarterly, 1st and 4th, Gules, on a saltire argent a rose of the field, barbed and seeded proper (Nevill of Raby); 2nd and 3rd, Or, fretty gules, on a canton per pale ermine and or, a galley sable (Nevill of Bulmer). Supporters Two bulls argent pied sable, armed, unguled, collared and chained, and at the end of the chain two staples, or. Motto Ne vile velis (Form no mean wish). Badge Dexter, A rose gules, barbed and seeded proper; Sinister, A portcullis or. Other versions Some sources omit the second and third quarters, and some have for a crest a bull statant, coloured, collared and chained as for the supporters, charged on the shoulder with a rose gules barbed and seeded proper.

== Notes ==
Parliament of Great Britain
Preceded by John Durand; Christopher D'Oyly	Member of Parliament for Seaford; 1784–1785; With: Sir Peter Parker	Succeeded by Sir John Henderson; Sir Peter Parker
Preceded by John Hanbury; John Morgan	Member of Parliament for Monmouthshire; 1784–1785; With: John Morgan	Succeeded by James Rooke; John Morgan
Peerage of Great Britain
Preceded by George Nevill	Earl of Abergavenny; 1785–1843	Succeeded by John Nevill
