= John Nevill, 3rd Earl of Abergavenny =

English peer

The Earl of Abergavenny
- Born: 25 December 1789
- Died: 12 April 1845 (aged 55)
- Noble family: House of Neville
- Father: Henry Nevill, 2nd Earl of Abergavenny
- Mother: Mary Robinson

John Nevill, 3rd Earl of Abergavenny (25 December 1789 – 12 April 1845), styled Hon. John Nevill until 1826 and Viscount Nevill from 1826 to 1843, was an English peer. He was wounded while on active service in the Peninsular War, and after the close of the Napoleonic War, took holy orders, holding family livings in Norfolk and Suffolk. The deaths of his two elder brothers made him heir to his father's earldom, to which he succeeded in 1843, but he was in delicate health and died in 1845.

The third son of Henry Nevill, 2nd Earl of Abergavenny and his wife Mary Robinson, he was born on 25 December 1789 and baptised on 27 February 1790 at Isleworth, Middlesex. On 20 October 1807, he purchased a second lieutenant's commission in the 23rd Regiment of Foot. He went out with the second battalion of the regiment to Ireland in November, and later served with the regiment in the Peninsular War. Nevill was promoted to lieutenant on 8 April 1809. After the Battle of Vittoria, he obtained one of Joseph Bonaparte's coats, which he brought back to the family home of Eridge Castle as a souvenir. Nevill was wounded at the Battle of Sorauren. On 27 January 1814, he purchased a captaincy in the 99th Regiment of Foot.

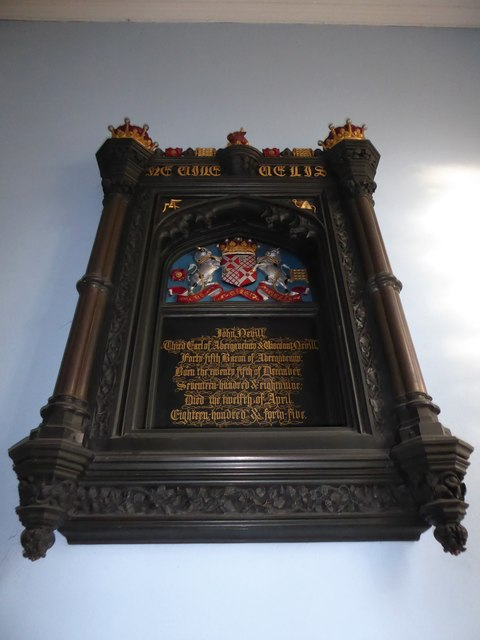
Memorial to John Nevill, 3rd Marquess of Abergavenny in St Alban's Church, Frant, East Sussex.

After the end of the Napoleonic Wars, Nevill returned home to take up an entirely new career and become a clergyman. He was admitted fellow-commoner to Christ's College, Cambridge on 11 November 1816 and received his MA in 1818. He was ordained deacon on 3 March 1817 and priest on 5 April 1817, and was then appointed vicar of Frant, Sussex on 13 April 1817. After the death of Augustus Beevor left a vacancy, Nevill was presented by his father as rector of Bergh Apton, Norfolk, and Otley, Suffolk on 10 July 1818, and on 14 July 1818, he was appointed chaplain to the Prince Regent. He resigned the vicarage of Frant on 23 September 1818 in favor of his younger brother William. In 1826, the death of his elder brother Ralph made Nevill his father's heir apparent, with the style of "Viscount Nevill". He resigned his two rectories on 15 April 1831.

Nevill's health was very poor after about 1842, and as a consequence, he only once attended the House of Lords after succeeding his father in the earldom in 1843. He died on 12 April 1845 at Eridge Castle; he had never married, and on his death the earldom passed to his younger brother, William. The 3rd Earl was buried at Frant on 22 April 1845.

== Arms ==
Coat of arms of John Nevill, 3rd Earl of Abergavenny
Crest Out of a ducal coronet or, a bull's head argent pied sable, armed gold, and charged on the neck with a rose gules barbed and seeded proper. Escutcheon Quarterly, 1st and 4th, Gules, on a saltire argent a rose of the field, barbed and seeded proper (Nevill of Raby); 2nd and 3rd, Or, fretty gules, on a canton per pale ermine and or, a galley sable (Nevill of Bulmer). Supporters Two bulls argent pied sable, armed, unguled, collared and chained, and at the end of the chain two staples, or. Motto Ne vile velis (Form no mean wish). Badge Dexter, A rose gules, barbed and seeded proper; Sinister, A portcullis or. Other versions Some sources omit the second and third quarters, and some have for a crest a bull statant, coloured, collared and chained as for the supporters, charged on the shoulder with a rose gules barbed and seeded proper.

== Notes ==
Peerage of Great Britain
Preceded by Henry Nevill	Earl of Abergavenny; 1843–1845	Succeeded by William Nevill
