= Augusta Mostyn =

English philanthropist and photographer

Lady Augusta Lloyd-Mostyn
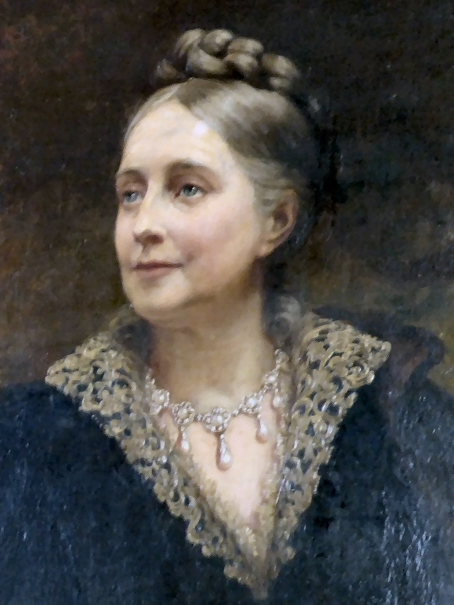
- Detail of a portrait of Augusta Mostyn by Herbert Sidney Percy (Mostyn Estates)
- Born: Henrietta Augusta Nevill; 18 June 1830; Birling, Kent
- Died: 25 January 1912 (aged 81)
- Known for: Photography
- Spouse: Thomas Lloyd-Mostyn
- Father: William Nevill, 4th Earl of Abergavenny
- Family: Caroline Emily Nevill; William Nevill, 1st Marquess of Abergavenny

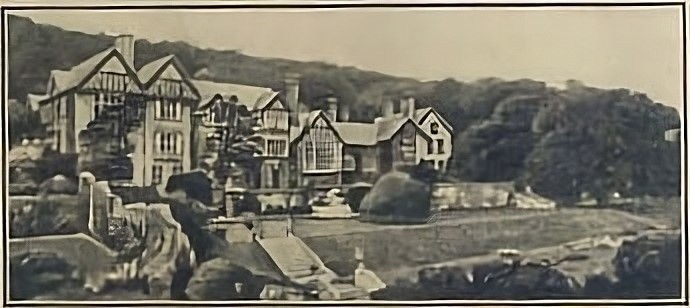
Gloddaeth Hall, of the Mostyn family, 1935

Lady Henrietta Augusta Lloyd-Mostyn (née Nevill; 18 June 1830 – 25 January 1912) was an English philanthropist and photographer who contributed to the development of the Welsh town of Llandudno.

== Life and work ==
Augusta Nevill was born at Birling Manor near Maidstone, Kent. Her parents were William Nevill, 4th Earl of Abergavenny, and Caroline Leeke. Her sisters, Lady Caroline Nevill and Lady Isabel Nevill, were also photographers.

On 19 July 1855, Lady Augusta Nevill married Thomas Lloyd-Mostyn. They had two sons, Llewelyn Neville Vaughan Lloyd-Mostyn and Harry Richard Lloyd-Mostyn. They lived at Gloddaeth Hall.

Lady Augusta Mostyn commissioned All Saints Church, Deganwy from the architect John Douglas as a memorial to her parents.

She commissioned the Mostyn Art Gallery in Llandudno, the precursor of the current Mostyn gallery, as a headquarters for the Gwynedd Ladies' Arts Society, a society that was set up by a 'Miss Clearance Whaite' (daughter of the president of Royal Cambrian Academy of Art), Lady Mostyn donated £10.10s (which was worth ~£1500 after inflation in 2019), thus making her the founder. This is thought to have been the first art gallery in the world dedicated to exhibiting work by women.

== Group exhibitions ==
- Exhibition of Recent Specimens of Photography, Society of Arts, London, 1852

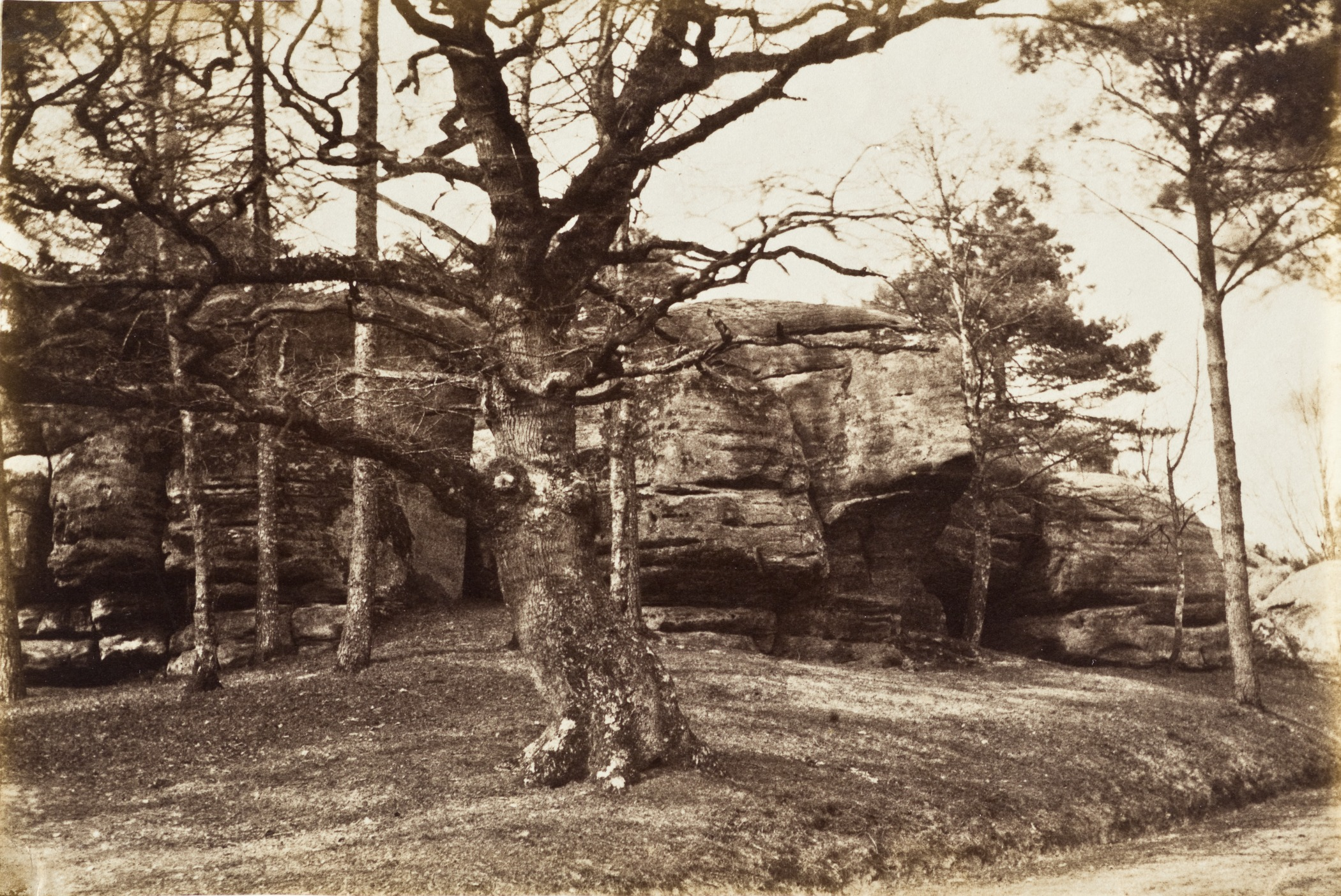
Tree and Rock, c. 1850. Los Angeles County Museum of Art.

== Collections ==
Mostyn's work is held in the following permanent collections:

- Denver Art Museum, Denver, Colorado
- J. Paul Getty Museum, Los Angeles, California: 4 prints (as of 6 March 2022)
- Los Angeles County Museum of Art, California: 1 print (as of 6 March 2022)
- National Gallery of Canada, Ottawa, Ontario, Canada: 1 print (as of 6 March 2022)
- National Science and Media Museum, Bradford, UK
- Nelson-Atkins Museum of Art, Kansas City, Missouri: 1 print (as of 6 March 2022)
