= Ririd Myddelton =

British Army officer and courtier (1902–1988)

Lieutenant-Colonel Ririd Myddelton MVO KStJ JP DL

High Sheriff of Denbighshire
- In office 1951–1952
- Preceded by: Charles McLaren
- Succeeded by: John Francis McLaren

Personal details
- Born: 25 February 1902
- Died: 7 February 1988 (aged 85)
- Spouse: Lady Margaret Petty-Fitzmaurice (m. 1931)
- Relations: William Nevill, 1st Marquess of Abergavenny (grandfather); Reginald Nevill, 2nd Marquess of Abergavenny (uncle); Henry Nevill, 3rd Marquess of Abergavenny (uncle)
- Children: 3
- Education: Royal Military College, Sandhurst

Lieutenant-Colonel Ririd Myddelton, MVO, KStJ, JP, DL (25 February 1902 – 7 February 1988), was a British Army officer, Welsh landowner and courtier.

== Early life ==
Myddelton was born on 25 February 1902 and was named after an ancient Myddelton ancestor. He was the eldest son of Col. Robert Edward Myddelton and Lady Violet Nevill, who married in 1898. His mother was divorced in 1897 from Henry Wellesley, 3rd Earl Cowley, and from that marriage, Myddelton's older half-brother was Christian Wellesley, 4th Earl Cowley. From his parents marriage, he had a sister, Idina Joan Myddelton (the wife of John Charles Trueman Mills, and later, Roland Cubitt, 3rd Baron Ashcombe), and a younger brother, Thomas Foulk Myddelton.

His paternal grandparents were Richard Myddelton (son of Robert Myddelton Biddulph MP for Denbigh Boroughs and Denbighshire) and Catherine Arabella Howard (a granddaughter of chemist Edward Charles Howard, a brother of Bernard Howard, 12th Duke of Norfolk). His mother was the youngest daughter of William Nevill, 1st Marquess of Abergavenny. Among his maternal family were uncles, Reginald Nevill, 2nd Marquess of Abergavenny and Henry Nevill, 3rd Marquess of Abergavenny and aunts Lady Idina Nevill (wife of Thomas Brassey, 2nd Earl Brassey) and Lady Rose Nevill (wife of Kenelm Pepys, 4th Earl of Cottenham).

He was educated at Eton College and the Royal Military College, Sandhurst.

== Career ==
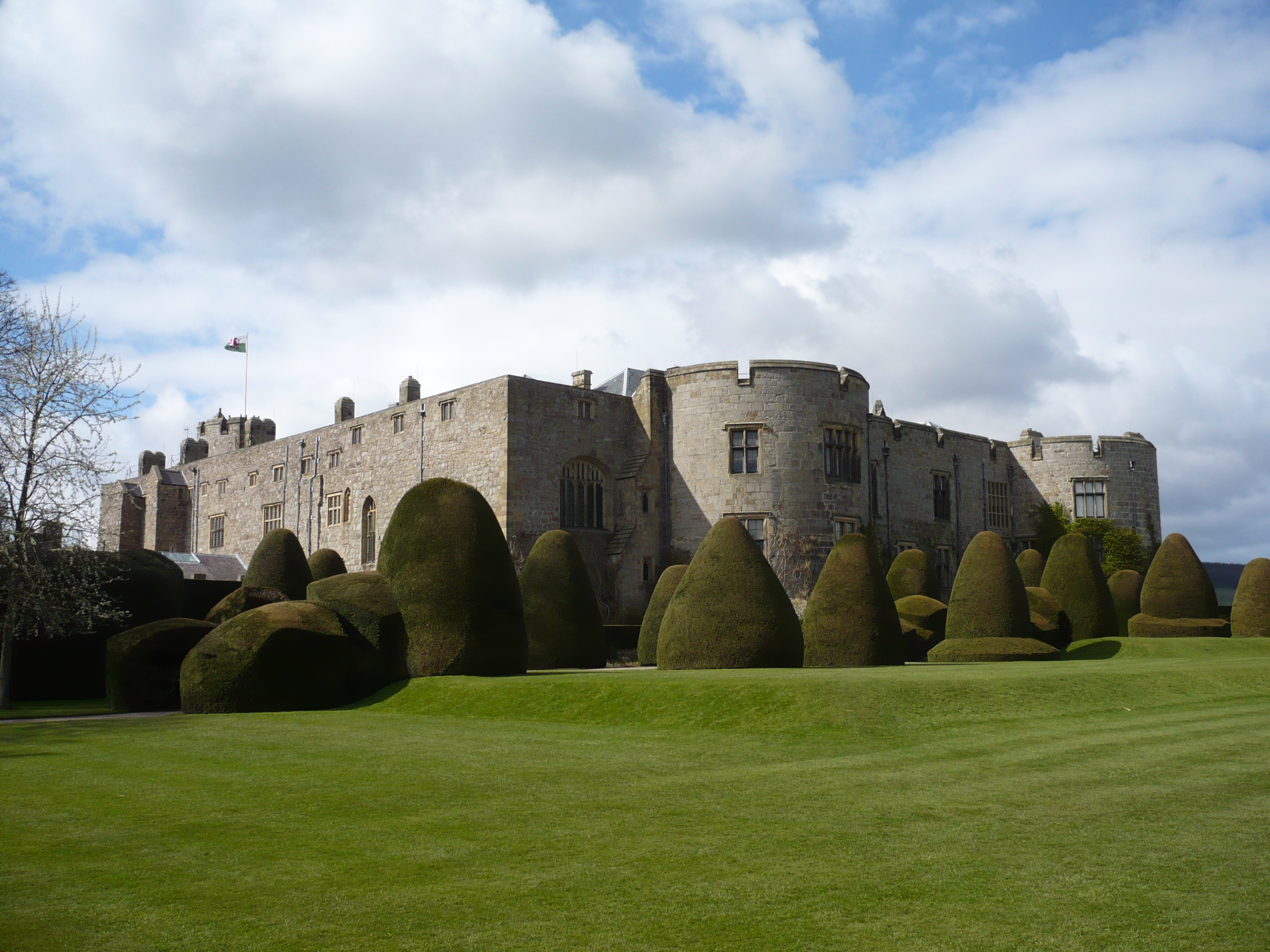
Myddelton's seat, Chirk Castle

He was an officer in the Coldstream Guards 1923 to 1946.

In 1928–1931 Myddelton was adjutant of the 3rd Battalion of the Coldstream Guards. In 1934–1937 he was a staff Captain in London District. He then joined the Royal Household as Deputy Master of the Household, an office he vacated in 1939 at the outbreak of World War II. However, by 1944 he was back in office. In 1939 to 1940 he was Deputy Assistant Adjutant-General in London District. In 1942 he took the Staff College, Camberley War Course, and subsequently commanded the 1st (Armoured) Battalion Coldstream Guards 1942–1944, including during the Normandy landings after D-Day and the advance across north west Europe.

From 1952 until his death in 1988 he was an Extra Equerry to The Queen.

Myddelton was made a MVO in 1945, and was appointed a Deputy lieutenant in 1949 and a commissioner of the peace in 1948; and was Vice Lieutenant of Denbigh 1968–1974. He was appointed a Knight of the Order of Saint John in 1961. He was High Sheriff of Denbighshire 1951–1952.

== Personal life ==
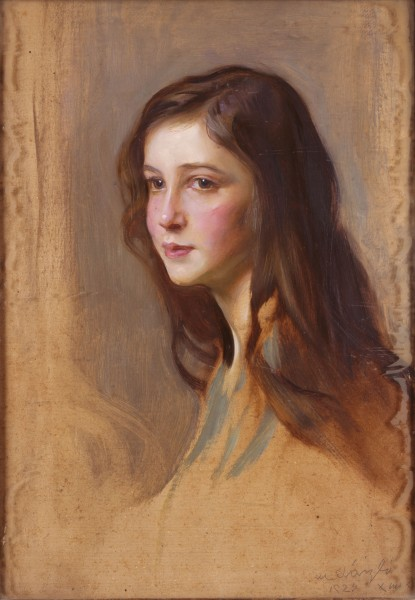
Portrait of his wife, Lady Margaret Mercer Nairne, by Philip de László, 1927

On 27 July 1931, Myddelton was married to (Mary) Margaret Elizabeth Mercer Nairne, daughter of Major Lord Charles Fitzmaurice and his wife, the former Lady Violet Elliot-Murray-Kynymound (daughter of Gilbert Elliot-Murray-Kynynmound, 4th Earl of Minto). Her younger brother was George Petty-Fitzmaurice, 8th Marquess of Lansdowne and she was granted the rank of a marquess's daughter in 1946. After Margaret's father was killed in action at Ypres in 1914, her mother remarried to John Jacob Astor, 1st Baron Astor of Hever (fourth son of William Waldorf Astor, 1st Viscount Astor). From her mother's second marriage, she had three half-siblings, including Gavin Astor, 2nd Baron Astor of Hever and John Astor, MP for Newbury. Together, Lady Margaret and Ririd were the parents of:

- Capt. David Foulk Myddelton (1932–2021), who married Anne Ratcliffe-Brotherton, daughter of Charles Frederick Ratcliffe-Brotherton, in 1965. After their divorce in 1968, he married Christine Serena Cherry Morris, daughter of Arthur Malcolm Morris, in 1970.
- Fiona Violet Myddelton, CVO (b. 1934), who married Sir Alastair Aird, in 1963. She was Extra Lady-in-waiting to Princess Margaret, Countess of Snowdon between 1960 and 2002.
- Hugh Robert Myddelton (b. 1938), who married Hon. Sarah Cecily Allsopp, daughter of Maj. Henry Allsopp, 5th Baron Hindlip.

Myddelton died on 7 February 1988. Myddelton's seat was Chirk Castle, which was occupied by the family until 2004.

== Arms ==
Coat of arms of Ririd Myddelton

Notes
Confirmed by the College of Arms on 30th June 1960.
Crest
1st a dexter hand couped Proper (Myddleton) 2nd a wolf salient Argent charged on the shoulder with a trefoil slipped Gules (Biddulph).
Escutcheon
Quarterly 1st & 4th Argent on a bend Vert three wolves' heads erased of the field (Myddleton) 2nd & 3rd Vert an eagle displayed and a canton Argent (Biddulph).

Honorary titles
Preceded by Charles McLaren	High Sheriff of Denbighshire; 1951	Succeeded by John Francis McLaren
