= Lord Richard Nevill =

British courtier (1862–1939)

Lord Richard Nevill CMG, CVO, DL
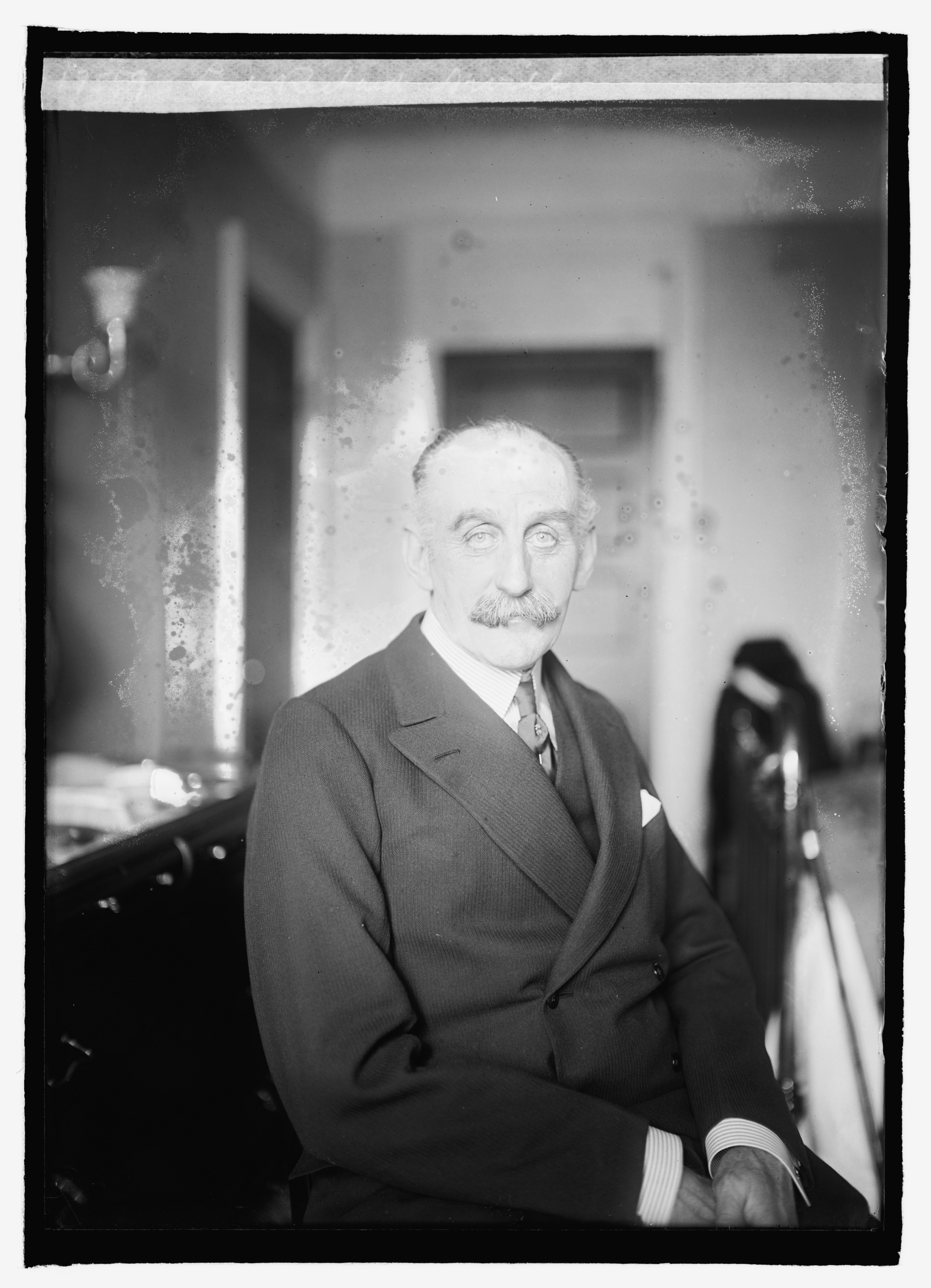
- Photograph of Lord Richard, 1922
- Born: Richard Plantagenet Nevill; 13 January 1862
- Died: 1 December 1939 (aged 77)
- Education: Eton College
- Alma mater: Magdalene College, Cambridge
- Parent(s): William Nevill, 1st Marquess of Abergavenny; Caroline Vanden-Bempdé Johnstone
- Relatives: Reginald Nevill, 2nd Marquess of Abergavenny (brother); Henry Nevill, 3rd Marquess of Abergavenny (brother); William Beauchamp Nevill (brother); Guy Larnach-Nevill, 4th Marquess of Abergavenny (nephew); Sir John Vanden-Bempde-Johnstone, 2nd Baronet (grandfather)

Lord Richard Plantagenet Nevill, CMG, CVO, DL (13 January 1862 – 1 December 1939) was a British courtier who served in the households numerous Australian state governors, as well as the governor-generals of Australia and Canada.

== Early life ==
Lord Richard was born on 13 January 1862 as the fifth son of William Nevill, 1st Marquess of Abergavenny and the former Caroline Vanden-Bempdé Johnstone. Among his siblings were Lady Cicely Louisa Nevill (wife of Col. the Hon. Charles Gathorne-Hardy), Reginald Nevill, 2nd Marquess of Abergavenny, Henry Nevill, 3rd Marquess of Abergavenny, Lord George Montacute Nevill (who married Florence Soanes was the father of the 4th Marquess of Abergavenny), Lady Alice Maud Nevill (wife of Col. Henry Morland), Lord William Beauchamp Nevill (who married Luisa del Campo Mello), Lady Idina Mary Nevill (wife of Thomas Brassey, 2nd Earl Brassey), Lady Rose Nevill (wife of Kenelm Pepys, 4th Earl of Cottenham), and Lady Violet Nevill (wife of Henry Wellesley, 3rd Earl Cowley).

His mother was a daughter of Sir John Vanden-Bempde-Johnstone, 2nd Baronet and Louisa Augusta Venables-Vernon-Harcourt (a daughter of Edward Venables-Vernon-Harcourt, Archbishop of York).

He was educated at Eton College and graduated from Magdalene College, Cambridge.

== Career ==
He first went to Australia as private secretary to Thomas Brassey, 1st Earl Brassey, Governor of Victoria, followed by spells as secretary and aide-de-camp to Sir John Madden, Lieutenant-Governor of Victoria, to Hallam Tennyson, 2nd Baron Tennyson, Governor of South Australia, to Henry Northcote, 1st Baron Northcote and the William Ward, 2nd Earl of Dudley as governor-generals of Australia, and as chamberlain to Thomas Denman, 3rd Baron Denman, Governor-General of Australia from 1911 to 1914, and Comptroller of the Household to the Duke of Connaught and Strathearn and the Duke of Devonshire from 1914 to 1921, whilst they were governor-generals of Canada.

== Personal life ==
In 1933, he was declared bankrupt, having "not been free from moneylenders for forty years"; he discharged his bankruptcy later that year.

He died unmarried on 1 December 1939.
