= Marquess of Abergavenny =

British title of nobility

Marquessate of Abergavenny
- Blazon Arms: Gules a saltire argent, charged with a rose of the field, barbed and seeded proper. Crest: Out of a ducal coronet or a bull’s head proper, charged with a rose gules. Supporters: On either side a bull argent, pied sable, armed, unguled, collared and chained or, the latter terminating in a staple or. Badges: Dexter: A rose gules, barbed and seeded proper; Sinister: A portcullis or.
- Creation date: 14 January 1876
- Created by: Queen Victoria
- Peerage: Peerage of the United Kingdom
- First holder: William Nevill, 5th Earl of Abergavenny
- Present holder: Christopher Nevill, 6th Marquess of Abergavenny
- Heir apparent: None
- Remainder to: the 1st Marquess's heirs male of the body lawfully begotten.
- Subsidiary titles: Earl of Abergavenny; Earl of Lewes; Viscount Nevill; Baron Bergavenny (until 1938)
- Status: Extant
- Seat: Eridge Park
- Former seats: Kidbrooke Park; Birling Manor
- Motto: Ne vile velis (Wish not wickedly)

Marquess of Abergavenny (pronounced Abergenny) in the County of Monmouth, is a title in the Peerage of the United Kingdom created on 14 January 1876, along with the title Earl of Lewes (pronounced "Lewis"), in the County of Sussex, for the 5th Earl of Abergavenny, a member of the Nevill family.

The 6th and present Marquess is Christopher George Charles Nevill (b. 23 April 1955), son of Lord Rupert Nevill and Lady Anne Camilla Evelyn Wallop. He succeeded to the title in 2000 on the death of his uncle the 5th Marquess, who had no surviving sons.

The family seat is Eridge Park, near Royal Tunbridge Wells, Kent.

== History ==
=== Medieval origins ===
The incumbent Marquess of Abergavenny is the current head of the House of Neville, a noble house of early medieval origins, notable for its central role in the Wars of the Roses. Lord Abergavenny's ancestor, Edward Neville, 3rd Baron Bergavenny, was a younger son of Ralph Neville, 1st Earl of Westmorland, and Lady Joan Beaufort, daughter of John of Gaunt, 1st Duke of Lancaster. Abergavenny in the Marquess's title derives from the market town in Wales in which this branch of the Nevill family inherited Abergavenny Castle, much of the family's ancestral lands and title of Baron Bergavenny by virtue of the marriage between the suo jure peeress Elizabeth de Beauchamp, Baroness Bergavenny, and Edward Neville in 1424.

=== Subsidiary titles ===
Subsequent Nevill Barons Bergavenny have been raised to higher ranks within the peerage. The 1st Marquess's ancestor, the de facto 17th (de jure 2nd) Baron Bergavenny, was created Earl of Abergavenny, in the County of Monmouth, and Viscount Nevill, of Birling in the County of Kent, in the Peerage of Great Britain on 17 May 1784. The Barony of Bergavenny was held by his successors, the Earls and Marquesses of Abergavenny, until 1938, when it passed into abeyance between the two daughters of the 3rd Marquess. The 5th Earl of Abergavenny was elevated to the title of Marquess of Abergavenny along with the subsidiary title of Earl of Lewes on 14 January 1876, following his role in the foundation of the modern-day Conservative Party with Disraeli and Lord Salisbury.

== Coat of arms ==
The heraldic blazon for the coat of arms of the Marquesses of Abergavenny is: Gules, a saltire argent charged with a rose of the field (barbed and seeded proper). These are the ancient arms of Neville differenced by a rose, the symbol of a 7th son, in reference to Sir Edward Neville, 1st Baron Bergavenny (d.1476), 7th son of Ralph Neville, 1st Earl of Westmorland. The blazon can be translated as "On a red background, a white saltire with a red rose, naturally coloured, upon it."

== Earl of Abergavenny (1784) ==
Other titles (1st Earl onwards): Viscount Nevill (GB 1784), Baron Bergavenny (GB 1724)

- George Nevill, 1st Earl of Abergavenny (1727–1785)
- Henry Nevill, 2nd Earl of Abergavenny (1755–1843)
  - Henry George Nevill, Viscount Nevill, (1785–1806)
  - Ralph Nevill, Viscount Nevill (1786–1826)
- John Nevill, 3rd Earl of Abergavenny (1789–1845)
- William Nevill, 4th Earl of Abergavenny (1792–1868)
- William Nevill, 5th Earl of Abergavenny (1826–1915) (created Marquess of Abergavenny in 1876)

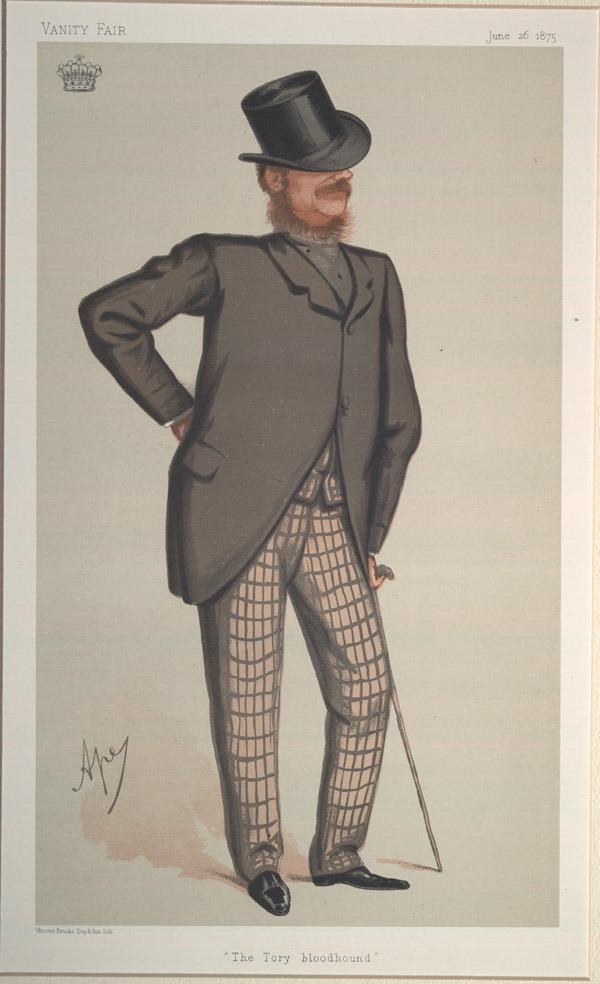
William Nevill, 5th Earl of Abergavenny (later the 1st Marquess), 'The Tory Bloodhound', depicted in a caricature by Ape published in the June edition of Vanity Fair in 1875.

=== Marquess of Abergavenny (1876) ===
Other titles (1st Marquess onwards): Viscount Nevill (GB 1784), Earl of Lewes (UK 1876)
Other titles (1st–3rd Marquesses): Baron Bergavenny (GB 1724, abeyant 1938)

- William Nevill, 1st Marquess of Abergavenny (1826–1915)
- Reginald William Bransby Nevill, 2nd Marquess of Abergavenny (1853–1927)
- Henry Gilbert Ralph Nevill, 3rd Marquess of Abergavenny (1854–1938)
  - Gilbert Reginald Nevill (1879–1891)
- Guy Temple Montacute Larnach-Nevill, 4th Marquess of Abergavenny (1883–1954)
  - Lord Rupert Nevill (1923-1982)
- John Henry Guy Nevill, 5th Marquess of Abergavenny (1914–2000)
  - Henry John Montague Nevill, Earl of Lewes (1948–1965)
- Christopher Nevill, 6th Marquess of Abergavenny (born 1955)

There are no heirs to the marquessate or to the earldom of Lewes. The heir presumptive to the earldom of Abergavenny is the present marquess's fourth cousin, Guy Michael Rossmore Nevill (born 1973). He is descended from the brother of the first marquess, and would succeed as the 11th earl.

== Family tree and line of succession ==
House of Neville family tree, including Earls of Westmorland, Earls of Abergavenny, Marquesses of Abergavenny, and many creations of the Barons Bergavenny

Uhtred
Dolfin d. aft. 1129	Gilbert de Neville d.1166/9 1st baron of Ashby
Maldred	Geoffrey de Neville d. 1193; 2nd baron of Ashby	Renata de Bulmer
Robert FitzMaldred c. 1150; Lord of Raby	Isabel de Neville
Geoffrey FitzRobert de Neville b. c. 1197–c. 1242; 1st Baron Nevill of Raby
Robert de Neville c. 1223–1282; 2nd Baron Nevill of Raby
Robert de Neville d. bef. 1282
Baron Neville of Raby (1st creation by writ), 1295
Ralph Neville; 1262–c. 1331; 3rd/1st Baron Neville de Raby
King Edward III; 1312–1377	Ralph Neville c. 1291–1367; 4th/2nd Baron Neville de Raby	Thomas Beauchamp c. 1313–1369; Earl of Warwick
Baron Bergavenny (1st creation), 1392
John of Gaunt; 1340–1377; Duke of Lancaster	John Neville; 5th/3rd Baron Neville de Raby c. 1337–1388	Alexander Neville c. 1340–1392; Archbishop of York	William Beauchamp c. 1343 – 1411; 1st Baron Bergavenny
Earl of Westmorland (1st creation), 1397
King Henry IV; 1367–1413	Joan Beaufort c. 1379–1440	Ralph Neville c. 1364–1425; 1st Earl of Westmorland; 6th/4th Baron Neville de Raby	John Neville c. 1382–1430; 6th Baron Latimer
King Henry V 1386–1422	John Neville c. 1387–1420	Richard Beauchamp c. 1394 – 1421/1422; Earl of Worcester, 2nd Baron Bergavenny
Baron Neville, 1459	Baron Latimer of Snape, 1432	Baron Bergavenny (2nd creation), 1450
Ralph Neville; 1406–1484; 2nd Earl of Westmorland; 7th/5th Baron Neville de Raby	John Neville c. 1410–1461; 1st Baron Neville (1459)	Richard Neville; 1400–1460; Earl of Salisbury	Alice Montacute; 1407–1462; Countess of Salisbury, Baroness Monthermer, 7th/Baroness Montagu	Robert Neville; 1404–1457; Bishop	Cecily Neville; 1415–1495	Richard of York; 1411–1460; Duke of York	William Neville c. 1405–1463; Earl of Kent	George Neville c. 1407–1469; 1st Baron Latimer of Snape	Edward Neville d. 1476; 3rd de facto Baron Bergavenny (1392), 1st Baron Bergavenny (1450)	Elizabeth Beauchamp; 1415–1448; 3rd Baroness Bergavenny de jure suo jure
Barony Neville attained, 1461 reversed, 1472
King Henry VI; 1421–1471	Cecily Neville c. 1425–1450	Richard Neville; 1428–1471; Earl of Warwick	John Neville; 1431–1471; Marquess of Montagu	George Neville; 1432–1476; Archbishop of York	Thomas Neville; 1429–1471; Viscount Fauconberg	Henry Neville of Latimer; 1437–1469
(m1.) Edward of Westminster; 1453–1471; Prince of Wales	King Edward IV; 1442–1483	Ralph Neville c. 1456–1499; 3rd Earl of Westmorland; 8th/6th Baron Neville de Raby; 2nd Baron Neville (1459)	(m2.) Richard III; 1452–1485	Anne Neville; 1456–1485	George Neville; 1461–1483; Duke of Bedford	Isabel Neville; 1451–1476	George Plantagenet; 1449–1478; Duke of Clarence	George Neville c. 1440–1492; 4th de facto Baron Bergavenny (1392), 2nd Baron Bergavenny (1450)
Ralph Neville d. 1498	Edward Plantagenet; 1475–1499; Earl of Warwick	Richard Neville c. 1468–1530; 2nd Baron Latimer of Snape	George Neville c. 1469–1535; 5th de facto Baron Bergavenny (1392), 3rd Baron Bergavenny (1450)	Edward Neville; 1471–1538	Thomas Nevill c. 1484–1542
Ralph Neville; 1498–1549; 4th Earl of Westmorland; 9th/7th Baron Neville de Raby; 3rd Baron Neville (1459)	John Neville; 1493–1543; 3rd Baron Latimer of Snape
Henry Neville; 1525–1569; 5th Earl of Westmorland; 10th/8th Baron Neville de Raby; 4th Baron Neville (1459)	John Neville; 1520–1577; 4th Baron Latimer of Snape	Henry Nevill c. 1527/1535–1587; 6th Baron Bergavenny (1392), 4th Baron Bergavenny (1450)	Edward Nevill c. 1526–1588; 7th de facto Baron Bergavenny (1392)	Henry Neville c. 1520–1593
Barony Latimer of Snape abeyant, 1577
Baron Bergavenny (3rd creation), 1604
Charles Neville; 1542–1601; 6th Earl of Westmorland; 11th/9th Baron Baron Neville de Raby; 5th Baron Neville (1459)'	Mary Nevill; 1554–1626; 7th/5th Baroness Bergavenny; 3rd Baroness le Despenser	Edward Nevill c. 1550–1622; 8th de facto Baron Bergavenny (1392), 1st Baron Bergavenny (1604)	Henry Neville c. 1564–1615
Earldom of Westmorland (1st creation) and subsidiary titles forfeit, 1571
Earl of Westmorland (2nd creation) and Baron Burghersh (3rd creation), 1624
Francis Fane; 1580–1629; 1st Earl of Westmorland, etc., 8th/6th Baron Bergavenny de jure, Baron le Despencer	Henry Nevill c. 1570–1641; 9th de facto Baron Bergavenny, 2nd Baron Bergavenny (1604)	Christopher d. 1649
Inheritance of Barony Bergavenny (3rd creation) unknown, 1641
Baron Bergavenny (4th creation), after 1641–1662
Mildmay Fane; 1602–1666; 2nd Earl of Westmorland, etc.	Francis Fane c. 1611–1681	John Nevill c. 1614–1662; 10th de facto Baron Bergavenny (1392), Baron Bergavenny (4th creation)	George Nevill c. 1615–1666; 11th Baron Bergavenny	Richard Nevill d. 1643
Barony Bergavenny (4th creation) extinct, 1662
Baron Bergavenny (5th creation), after 1666–1695
Francis Fane d. 1691	George Nevill; 1665–1695; 12th de facto Baron Bergavenny (1392), Baron Bergavenny (5th creation)	George Nevill d. 1665
Barony Bergavenny (5th creation) extinct, 1695
Baron Bergavenny (6th creation), 1695
Charles Fane; 1635–1691; 3rd Earl of Westmorland, etc.	Vere Fane; 1645–1693; 4th Earl of Westmorland, etc.	Henry Fane of Brympton; 1669–1726	George Nevill c. 1659–1720/21; 13th de facto Baron Bergavenny (1392), 1st Baron Bergavenny (1695)	Edward Nevill 1664–1701
Vere Fane; 1678–1698; 5th Earl of Westmorland, etc.	Thomas Fane; 1681–1736; 6th Earl of Westmorland, etc.	John Fane; 1686–1762; 7th Earl of Westmorland, etc.
Baron Bergavenny (6th creation) abeyance terminated, 1737	Baron Bergavenny (7th creation), 1724
Thomas Fane; 1701–1771; 8th Earl of Westmorland, etc.	George Nevill; 1702–1723; 14th de facto Baron Bergavenny (1392), 2nd Baron Bergavenny (1695)	Jane Nevill, later Walter; 1703–1786; 4th Baroness Bergavenny (1695)	Edward Nevill c. 1705–1724; 15th de facto Baron Bergavenny (1392), 3rd Baron Bergavenny (1695)	William Nevill d. 1744; 16th de facto Baron Bergavenny (1392), 1st Baron Bergavenny (1724)
Barony Bergavenny (6th creation) abeyant, 1724
Earl of Abergavenny and Viscount Nevill, 1784
John Fane; 1728–1774; 9th Earl of Westmorland, etc.	John Walter d. 1806; 5th Baron Bergavenny (1695)	Charlotte Walter, later Senior c. 1738–1811; 6th Baroness Bergavenny (1695)	George Nevill; 1727–1785; 1st Earl of Abergavenny, etc., 17th de facto Baron Bergavenny (1392), 2nd Baron Bergavenny (1724)	Edward Nevill b. 1729
Barony Bergavenny (6th creation) abeyant, 1811
John Fane; 1759–1841; 10th Earl of Westmorland, etc.	Henry Nevill; 1755–1843; 2nd Earl of Abergavenny, etc., 18th de facto Baron Bergavenny (1392), 3rd Baron Bergavenny (1724)
John Fane; 1784–1859; 11th Earl of Westmorland, etc.	John Nevill; 1789–1845; 3rd Earl of Abergavenny, etc., 19th de facto Baron Bergavenny (1392), 4th Baron Bergavenny (1724)	William Nevill; 1792–1868; 4th Earl of Abergavenny, etc., 20th de facto Baron Bergavenny (1392), 5th Baron Bergavenny (1724)
Marquess of Abergavenny and Earl of Lewes, 1876
Francis William Henry Fane; 1825–1891; 12th Earl of Westmorland, etc.	William Nevill; 1826–1915; 1st Marquess of Abergavenny, etc., 5th Earl of Abergavenny, etc., 21st de facto Baron Bergavenny (1392), 6th Baron Bergavenny (1724)	Caroline Emily Nevill; 1829–1887	Henrietta Augusta Nevill; 1830–1912	Ralph Pelham Nevill; 1832–1914
Anthony Mildmay Julian Fane; 1859–1922; 13th Earl of Westmorland, etc.	Reginald William Bransby Nevill; 1853–1927; 2nd Marquess of Abergavenny, etc., 6th Earl of Abergavenny, etc., 22th de facto Baron Bergavenny (1392), 7th Baron Bergavenny (1724)	Henry Gilbert Ralph Nevill; 1854–1938; 3rd Marquess of Abergavenny, etc., 7th Earl of Abergavenny, etc., 23rd de facto Baron Bergavenny (1392), 8th Baron Bergavenny (1724)	George Montacute Nevill; 1856–1920	William Beauchamp Nevill; 1860–1939	Richard Plantagenet Nevill; 1862–1939	Percy Llewelyn Nevill; 1877–1927
Barony Bergavenny (6th and 7th creations) abeyant, 1938
Vere Anthony Francis Fane; 1893–1948; 14th Earl of Westmorland, etc.	Guy Temple Montacute Larnach-Nevill; 1883–1954; 4th Marquess of Abergavenny, etc., 8th Earl of Abergavenny, etc.
David Anthony Thomas Fane; 1924–1993; 15th Earl of Westmorland, etc.	John Henry Guy Nevill; 1914–2000; 5th Marquess of Abergavenny, etc., 9th Earl of Abergavenny, etc.	Rupert Charles Montecute Nevill; 1923–1982	Michael George Ralph Nevill; 1917–1943
Anthony David Francis Henry Fane b. 1951; 16th Earl of Westmorland, etc.	Harry St. Clair Fane; 1953–2023 styled Lord Burghersh	Christopher George Charles Nevill b. 1955; 6th Marquess of Abergavenny, etc., 10th Earl of Abergavenny, etc.	David Michael Ralph Nevill; 1941-2025	Michael George Rathmore Nevill b. 1943
Daisy Caroline Fane b. 1989	Sam Michael David Fane b. 1989	Guy Michael Rossmore Nevill b. 1973
Heir presumptive to the Earldom of Westmorland	Heir presumptive to the Earldom of Abergavenny
George David Roland Nevill b. 2010	Frederick Guy James Nevill b. 2012	Ralph William James Nevill b. 2015

Line of succession to the earldom of Abergavenny
- William Nevill, 4th Earl of Abergavenny (1792–1868)
  - William Nevill, 1st Marquess and 5th Earl of Abergavenny (1826–1915)
    - Reginald Nevill, 2nd Marquess and 6th Earl of Abergavenny (1853–1927)
    - Henry Nevill, 3rd Marquess and 7th Earl of Abergavenny (1854–1938)
    - Lord George Montacute Nevill (1856–1920)
      - Guy Larnach-Nevill, 4th Marquess and 8th Earl of Abergavenny (1883–1954)
        - John Nevill, 5th Marquess and 9th Earl of Abergavenny (1914–2000)
        - Lord Rupert Nevill (1923–1982)
          - Christopher Nevill, 6th Marquess and 10th Earl of Abergavenny (b. 1955)
  - Hon. Ralph Pelham Nevill (1832–1914)
    - Percy Llewelyn Nevill (1877–1927)
      - Michael George Ralph Nevill (1917–1943)
        - David Michael Ralph Nevill (1941-2025)
          - (1) Guy Michael Rossmore Nevill (b. 1973)
            - (2) George David Roland Nevill (b. 2010)
            - (3) Frederick Guy James Nevill (b. 2012)
            - (4) Ralph William James Nevill (b. 2015)

== See also ==
- Abergavenny Museum
- Baron Bergavenny
- House of Neville
- Eridge Park

== Sources ==
- Kidd, Charles (1903). Debrett's peerage, baronetage, knightage, and companionage. London, UK: Dean & Son Limited. p. 64. Archived from the original on 20 June 2016. Alt URL
- Hesilrige, Arthur G. M. (1921). Debrett's Peerage and Titles of courtesy. London, UK: Dean & Son Limited. p. 21.
