= William Beauchamp Nevill =

English aristocratic fraudster and writer (1860–1939)

Lord William Beauchamp Nevill
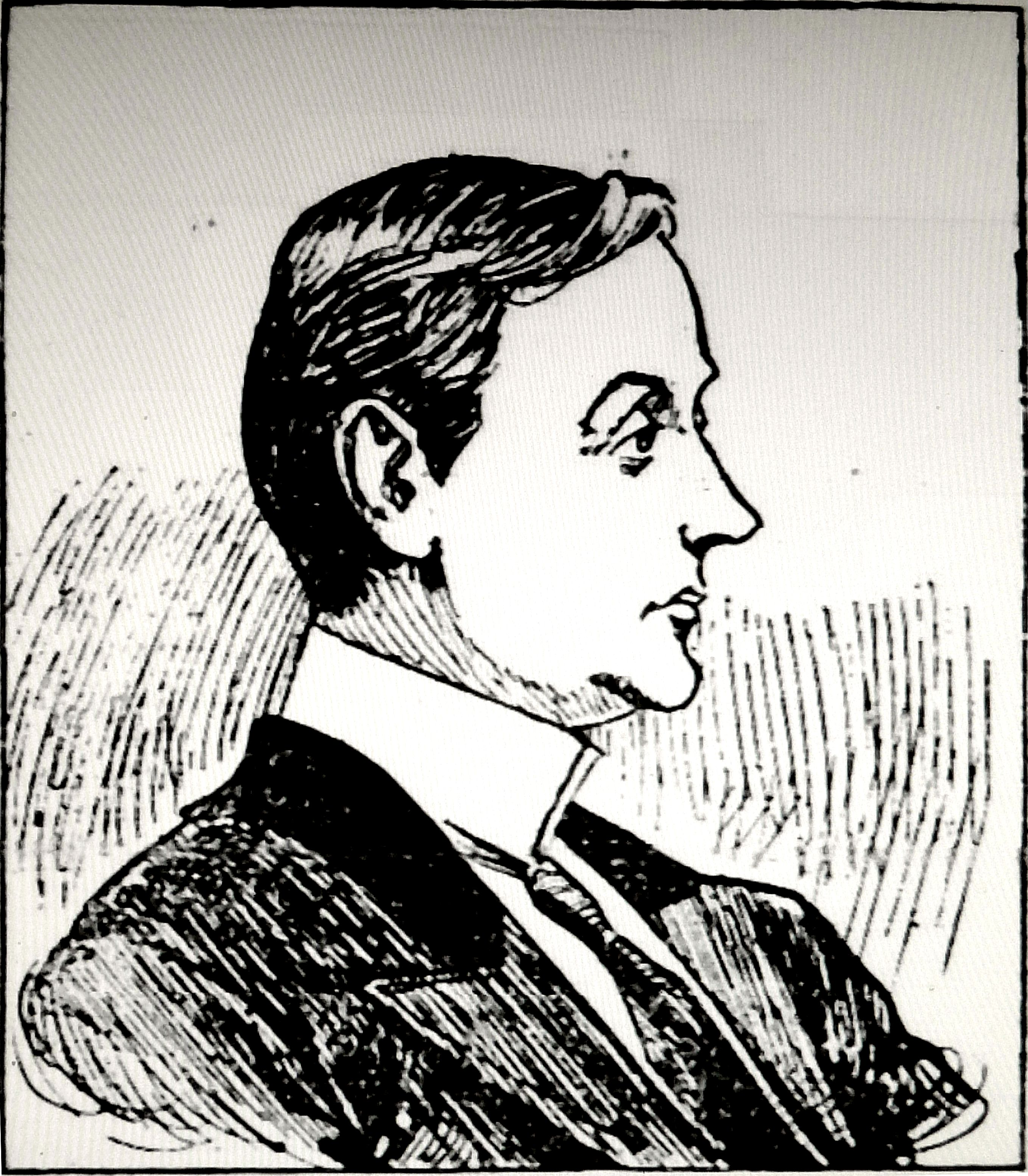
- William Beauchamp Nevill, 1898
- Born: 23 May 1860; Bramham, West Riding of Yorkshire, England
- Died: 12 May 1939 (aged 78); Kensington, London, England
- Occupations: Lieutenant, 3rd Battalion, Royal West Kent Regiment; Aide-de-camp to the Lord Lieutenant of Ireland
- Known for: 1898 trial and imprisonment for fraud; 1907 trial and imprisonment for theft
- Notable work: Book, Penal Servitude (1903)
- Father: William Nevill, 1st Marquess of Abergavenny

Signature
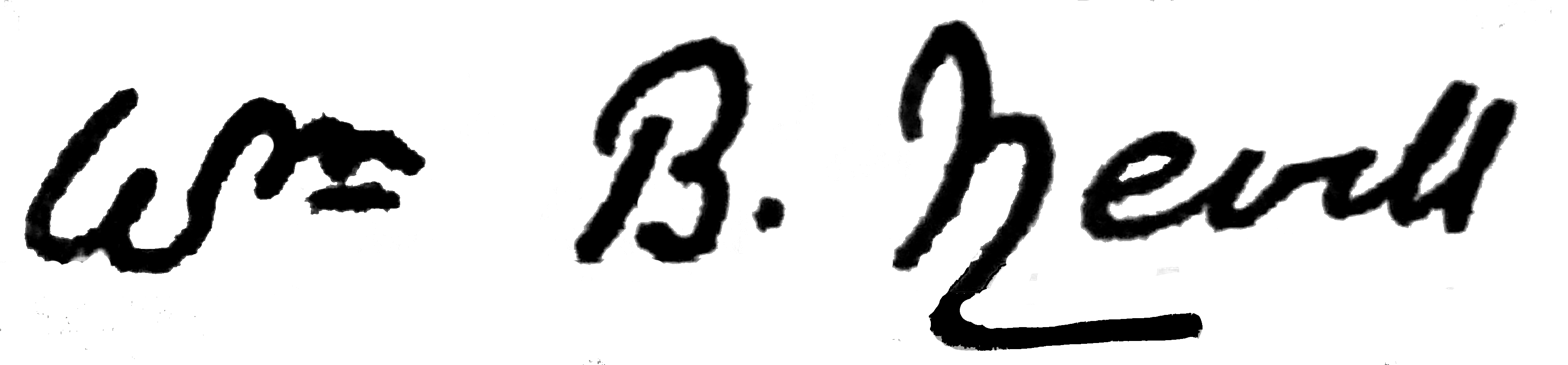

Lord William Beauchamp Nevill (23 May 1860 – 12 May 1939) was an English aristocrat who was born into the wealthy family of William Nevill, 1st Marquess of Abergavenny, grew up in Eridge Castle, and attended Eton College. His marriage to Mabel Murietta, daughter of an alleged mistress of Edward VII, Jesusa Murietta, was a glittering affair, attracting many royal and aristocratic guests and 600 wedding gifts. However Nevill lost much of his good fortune when his father wanted to reject him for converting to Catholicism and turning to trade, and the remainder of it when his wife's rich father's business failed soon after the wedding.

Nevill did not attract newspaper attention in his lifetime for any kind of high living, foreign tours (other than his honeymoon), business ventures or mistresses. He kept one house in London, and had no children to put through public school or provide dowries for. He nevertheless accrued huge debts within eight years of his marriage, and was arrested for a fraudulent attempt to acquire money to pay debts in 1898, putting shame on his family and causing a national scandal. For this he was sentenced to five years of penal servitude with hard labour in Wormwood Scrubs and Parkhurst.

Having earned an early release for good behaviour, Nevill wrote his only book, Penal Servitude, under the pen-name W.B.N., detailing his prison experiences. The book attracted much public attention, and some controversy, although his concern for prison reform, and his considered approach and fair treatment of prison staff, was noted by most reviewers. Nevertheless, by 1907 he was back in prison serving a one-year sentence for another fraud, again committed for the purpose of obtaining money to pay debts. Throughout his incarcerations, his wife continued to support him faithfully.

After leaving prison for a second time, Nevill lived a quiet life, suffering his last years in pain following a road accident.

== Background ==
William Beauchamp Nevill (1860–1939) (Note: GRO index: Births Jun 1860 Nevill William Beauchamp Tadcaster 9c 561. Deaths Jun 1939 Nevill William B. 78 Kensington 1a 96. All contemporary newspaper sources style Nevill as "Lord", although Burke's Peerage (1914) does not credit him with an Earldom or similar.) was the fourth son of William Nevill, 1st Marquess of Abergavenny (16 September 1826 – 12 December 1915) of Eridge Castle and Caroline Vanden-Bempde-Johnstone (April 1826 – Eridge Castle 23 September 1892). His siblings included Reginald Nevill, 2nd Marquess of Abergavenny, Henry Nevill, 3rd Marquess of Abergavenny and Lord George Montacute Nevill. He was uncle to Guy Larnach-Nevill, 4th Marquess of Abergavenny, and brother-in-law to Thomas Brassey, 2nd Earl Brassey, Kenelm Pepys, 4th Earl of Cottenham and Henry Wellesley, 3rd Earl Cowley.

Nevill was born at Bramham, West Riding of Yorkshire, most likely at Hope Hall (now derelict), and educated at Eton. In 1861, William aged 10 months was at home in Hope Hall, Bramham, with 5 of his siblings and 13 servants, the parents being away visiting at Westminster. The 1871 Census sees both parents and all of their ten children at Eridge Castle, with 5 visitors and 31 servants, indoors and in stables and garden. In 1881 Nevill was living at 34 Dover Street, Mayfair, with his father and 4 servants. The 1891 Census finds him at 18 Hans Place, Chelsea, with his younger brother Richard (who was to be his best man at his wedding) and ten servants.

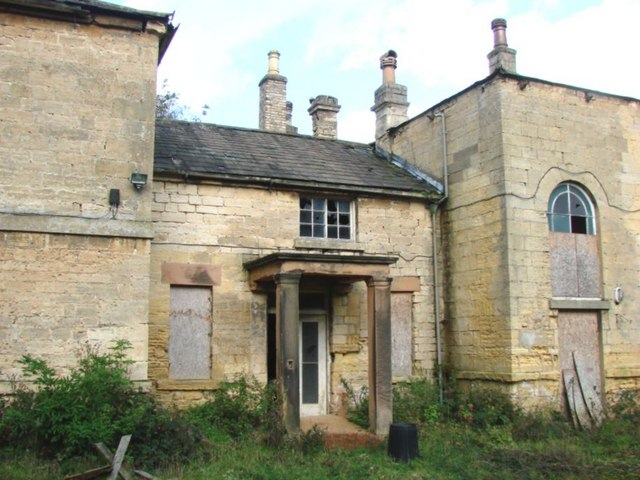
Hope Hall, Bramham, (now derelict)

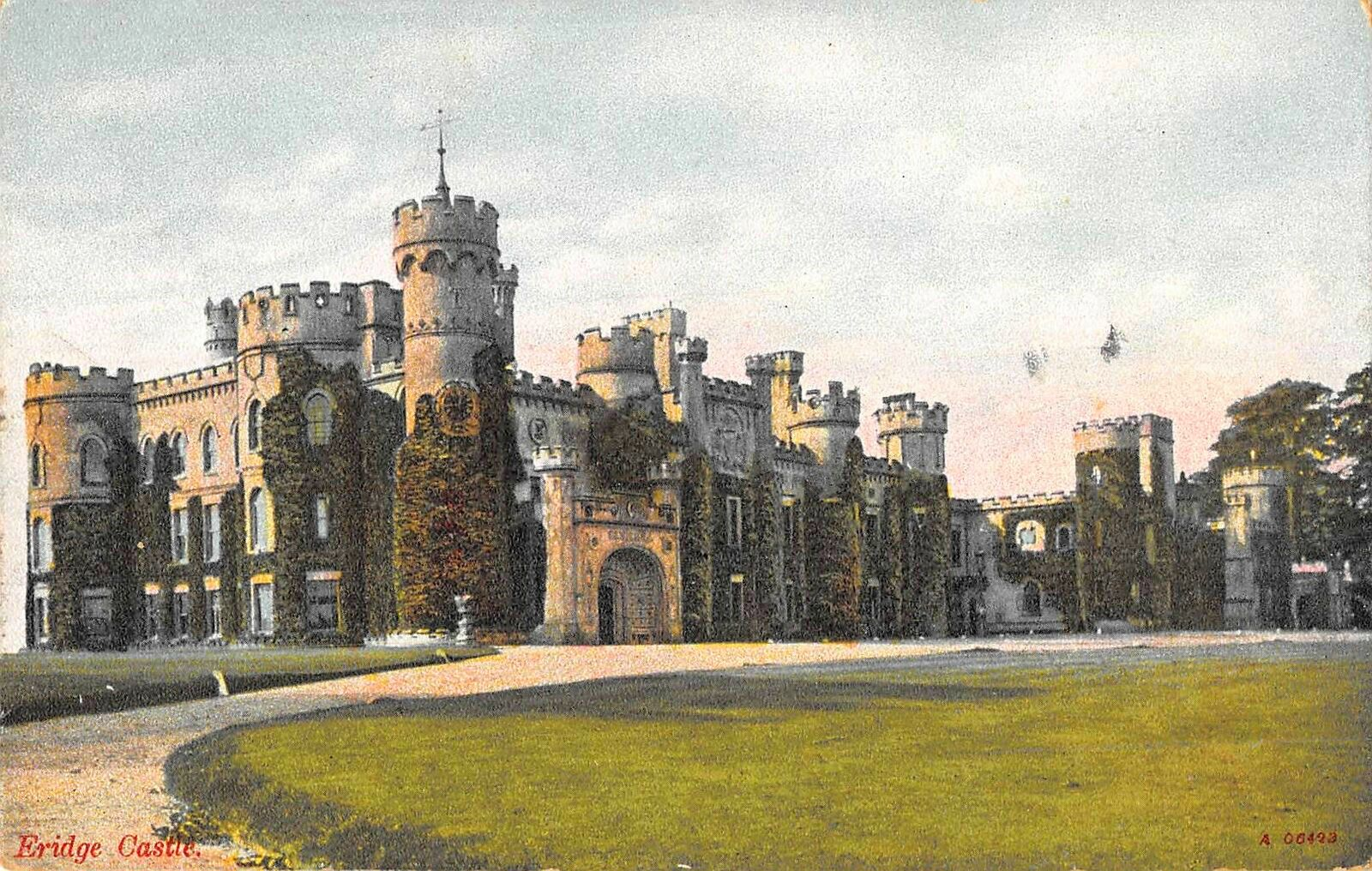
Eridge Castle, Sussex, where Nevill grew up (demolished 1938)

=== Marriage ===
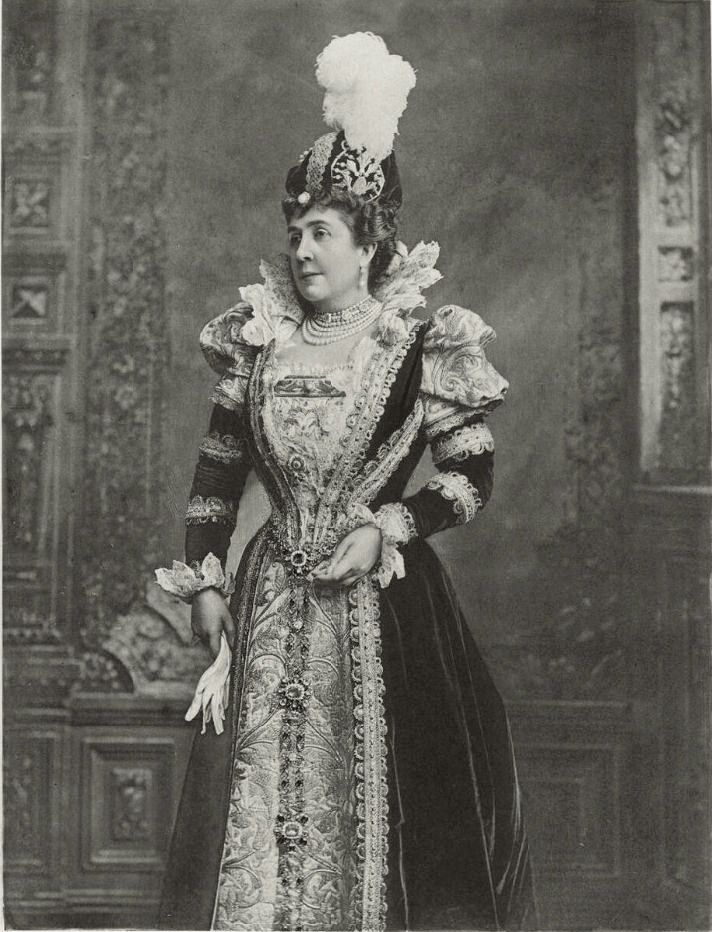
The bride's mother, Jesusa Murietta

Nevill's wedding "had been the principal topic of conversation for some time past in all sections of society". At Brompton Oratory by special permission of Cardinal Manning, on 12 February 1889, Nevill married Luisa Maria Carmen del Campo Mello (Kensington c.1864 – Kensington 1951), known as Mabel Murietta, (Note: GRO index: Deaths Dec 1951 Nevill Luisa M. C. 87 Kensington 5c 1005) who as a child had been a "great favourite" of the Prince of Wales. Her father was Don José Murrieta del Campo Mello y Urrutio, Marqués de Santurce (1833–1915), of Wadhurst Park, Sussex, a reputed "possessor of great wealth". Mabel's mother was Jesusa Murrieta del Campo Mello y Urritio (née Bellido), Marquesa de Santurce (c.1834–1898), known as Jesusa Murietta, an alleged mistress of the Prince of Wales. The Prince of Wales said at the wedding breakfast that "he had been an old friend of the bride's father and mother, and had known [Mabel] from the days of her childhood".

The marriage was conducted by the Bishop of Salford, and attended by royalty, and numerous members of the aristocracy, "a very brilliant gathering", including the Prince and Princess of Wales (later Edward VII and Alexandra), the princesses Louise, Victoria and Maud, Prince George of Wales, the Duke of Teck and his son Prince Francis. Due to cold weather, the bride and female guests wore velvet and furs. Each of the six bridesmaids carried a "dark blue enamelled chatelaine watch, the gift of the bridegroom". "It was very interesting to watch the arrival of the guests, several vergers escorting some specially great lady, who would sail along with that wonderful air of being somebody which could never be successfully imitated". Charles Santley sang the passages in the offertory. "The Oratory was packed with sightseers, and the road outside, and other roads approaching the building, were thronged with people".

The wedding breakfast took place at the Carlton House Terrace (or possibly 18 Carlton House Gardens) mansion of the Muriettas. The couple received 600 wedding gifts including "a magnificent cat's eye and diamond horse-shoe brooch" from the Prince and Princess of Wales, "a fine antique George I punch bowl" from the ex-empress Eugenie, and "a blue stick parasol, the long stick of which is mounted with gold, and the handle studded with brilliants as large as peas" from the Duke and Duchess de Fernán Núñez. Quite a few of the other gifts were of diamonds. Nevill and his wife took their honeymoon in Paris and Rome, travelling initially to Dover with the Prince of Wales in a "special train". In Rome, the couple attended the consecration of Monsignor Stonor at St John Lateran "attended by most of the English residents and visitors in Rome". In May, following her return, Lady Nevill was presented to Queen Victoria.

Nevill and his wife had no children. (Note: GRO index: Marriages Mar 1889 Nevill William Beauchamp and de Murrieta Luisa Maria C. Kensington 1a 273) Shortly after the wedding, Nevill announced that he henceforth wished to be styled Beauchamp Nevill, not Lord William Beauchamp Nevill. However, by 1898, he was still "commonly called Lord William Nevill". In 1907 Nevill was living at 72 Eaton Place, Belgrave Square, London, and in 1911 and 1921 he and his wife were living with six (later four) servants at 37 Onslow Gardens, SW London. In 1931 Dame Nellie Melba left £1,000 (equivalent to £58,897 in 2025) to Nevill and his wife.

=== Career ===
Nevill was a 2nd lieutenant of the 3rd Battalion, Royal West Kent Regiment from 14 March 1879, promoted to lieutenant on 4 May 1881, resigning his commission on 14 April 1882. He was aide-de-camp (ADC) to the Lord Lieutenant of Ireland at some point between 1876 and 1880.

At the time of his marriage in 1889 he was a partner in "a wine merchant's business in the city". Another version of this story says that he "secured a position in the office of the firm of the Marquis de Santurce", the rich father of his future bride.

=== Personality ===
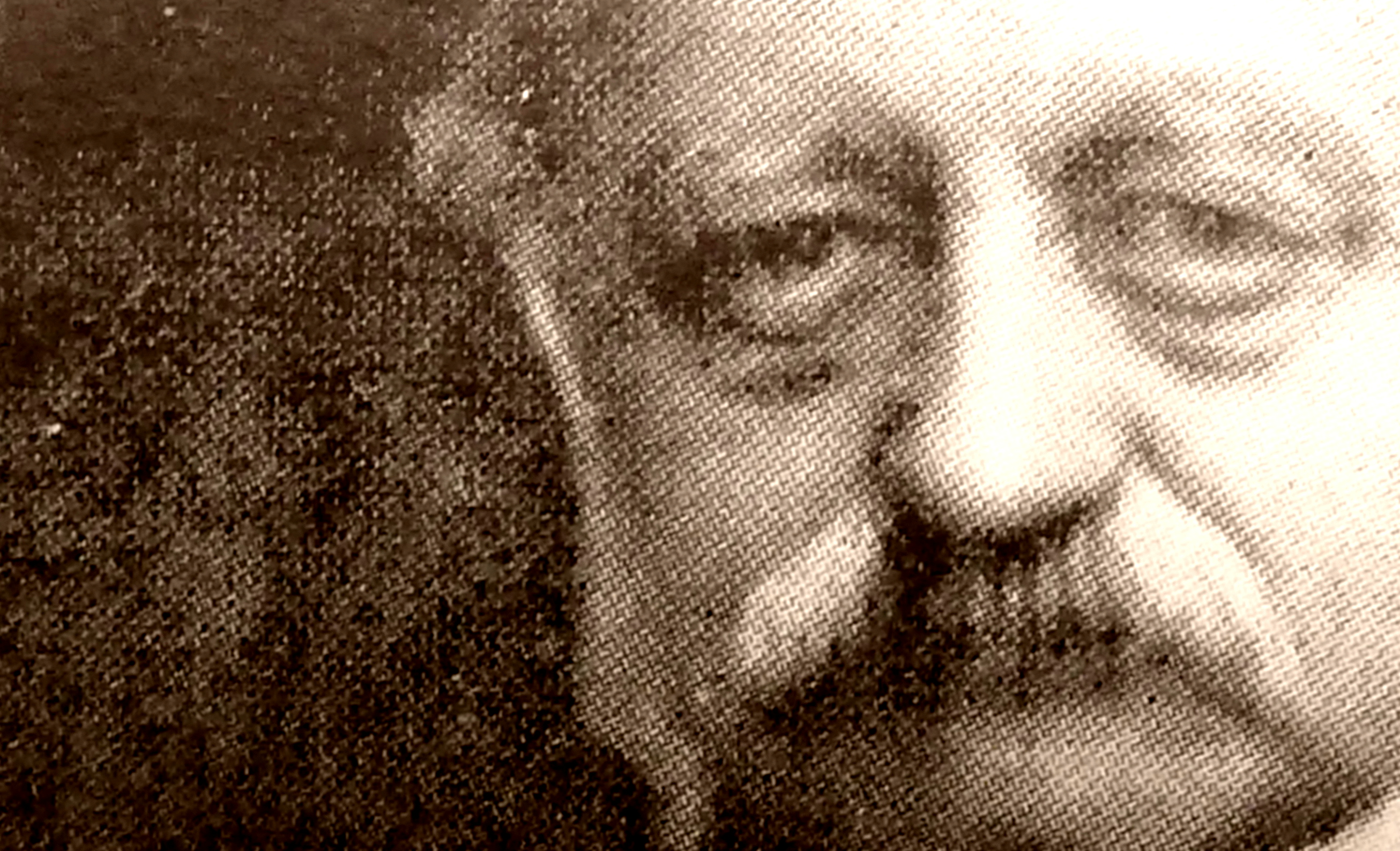
Nevill's father, the Marquess of Abergavenny

The Newcastle Courant commented in 1889 that Nevill was "of very distinguished appearance", and that he and his wife were "favourites of society". In 1907 he was still "a tall, handsome, well-groomed figure".

However, three or four years before his marriage Nevill converted to Roman Catholicism and went into trade, which gave "great annoyance to his father ... who was at one time credited with an intention to cut him off with a shilling; but the Prince of Wales apparently had interceded on behalf of his young friend with success". However, his father "was stated to have stopped his allowance". The Evesham Journal reported in 1898 that "Lord William Nevill [was] of blue blood but belong[ed] to the splended paupers. His marriage to a daughter of the Murriettas did not repair his battered fortunes, for the great Spanish financiers went to pieces shortly afterwards. Lord William borrowed royally".

== Downfall ==
Having already borrowed "considerable sums" totalling up to "£80,000 (equivalent to £9,201,725 in 2025) from various firms", in June 1896 Nevill visited moneylender Samuel "Sam" Lewis of Cork Street, London, carrying a promissory note for £8,000 (equivalent to £920,172 in 2025) signed by Herbert Henry Spender-Clay (1875–1937) [of the 2nd Regiment of Life Guards], with the intention of raising money on the note. Spender-Clay was "a young man just of age, and heir to a large share of the Bass brewers at Burton", and a person whom Nevill had known as a youth and with whom he had lived on terms of intimacy. Following a telephone conversation, Nevill returned to Lewis's office with a second note for £2,000 (equivalent to £230,043 in 2025) and letters of authority from Spender-Clay. However, Nevill did not permit the moneylender to contact Spender-Clay, but stated that only he, Nevill, should be contacted, at his address at 27 Charles Street, Mayfair. Nevill ultimately had Lewis agreeing to pay out "£17,000 or £18,000" (equivalent to £2,070,388 in 2025) as a loan on the security of the bills offered, and when the bills fell due to be paid Lewis wrote to Spender-Clay at Knightsbridge Barracks for his money. Spender-Clay promptly sent Lewis' letters to his solicitor, Spender-Clay did not get paid for the bills, and Lewis was told that Nevill "could do without the money".

In The People's 1939 obituary of Nevill, it was suggested that the crime was committed because Nevill was "unable to keep up with the riotous extravagance of his friends of the gay 'nineties". However, Nevill did not attract newspaper attention in his lifetime for any kind of high living, foreign tours (other than his honeymoon), business ventures or mistresses. He kept one house in London, and had no children to put through public school or provide dowries for. (Note: During Nevill's lifetime, the word, "gay", in England meant "joyful" or "celebratory", and in Nevill's social context could imply parties and drinking.)

Nevill discreetly removed himself to Paris, in March 1897. After Lewis failed to retrieve his money from Spender-Clay in the High Court, the Treasury took up the case, and Nevill's solicitor Sir George Lewis was informed in January 1898. He "at once advised his client to have the matter threshed out", and Nevill was "very prompt to surrender to the charge of fraud", returning forthwith to Sir George Lewis' offices in London – to be met there by a detective inspector who took him by cab straight to Bow Street Magistrates' Court.

== Court cases ==
These cases of 1897 and 1898 were known as the Hidden Signature Cases.

=== Lewis versus Spender-Clay, 1897 ===
The first action pertaining to Nevill's eventual imprisonment was the High Court action of 1897, Lewis versus Spender-Clay. The moneylender Samuel Lewis sued Spender-Clay for "£11,000 (equivalent to £1,236,151 in 2025) on promissory notes, alleged to have been signed by Mr. Clay and Lord William conjointly ... Mr Clay's defence was that his signature had been obtained on false representations – that he had signed documents covered with blotting paper, having no idea that they were promissory notes". Spender-Clay said that "Lord William told him they were documents in connection with the divorce proceedings which his sister was taking against her husband, Lord Cowley. and on that representation he signed the documents". Nevill had followed Spender-Clay into his bedroom in order to complete this transaction. The Evening Herald (Dublin) reported, moreover, that Spender-Clay was induced to sign "through holes in some blotting paper", and that Spender-Clay had known Nevill for "a long time" and believed him. This occurred at an Ascot house party. The jury decided in favour of Spender-Clay, and the Treasury "took up the affair".

=== HM Treasury versus Nevill, 1898 ===
==== First appearance, Bow Street ====
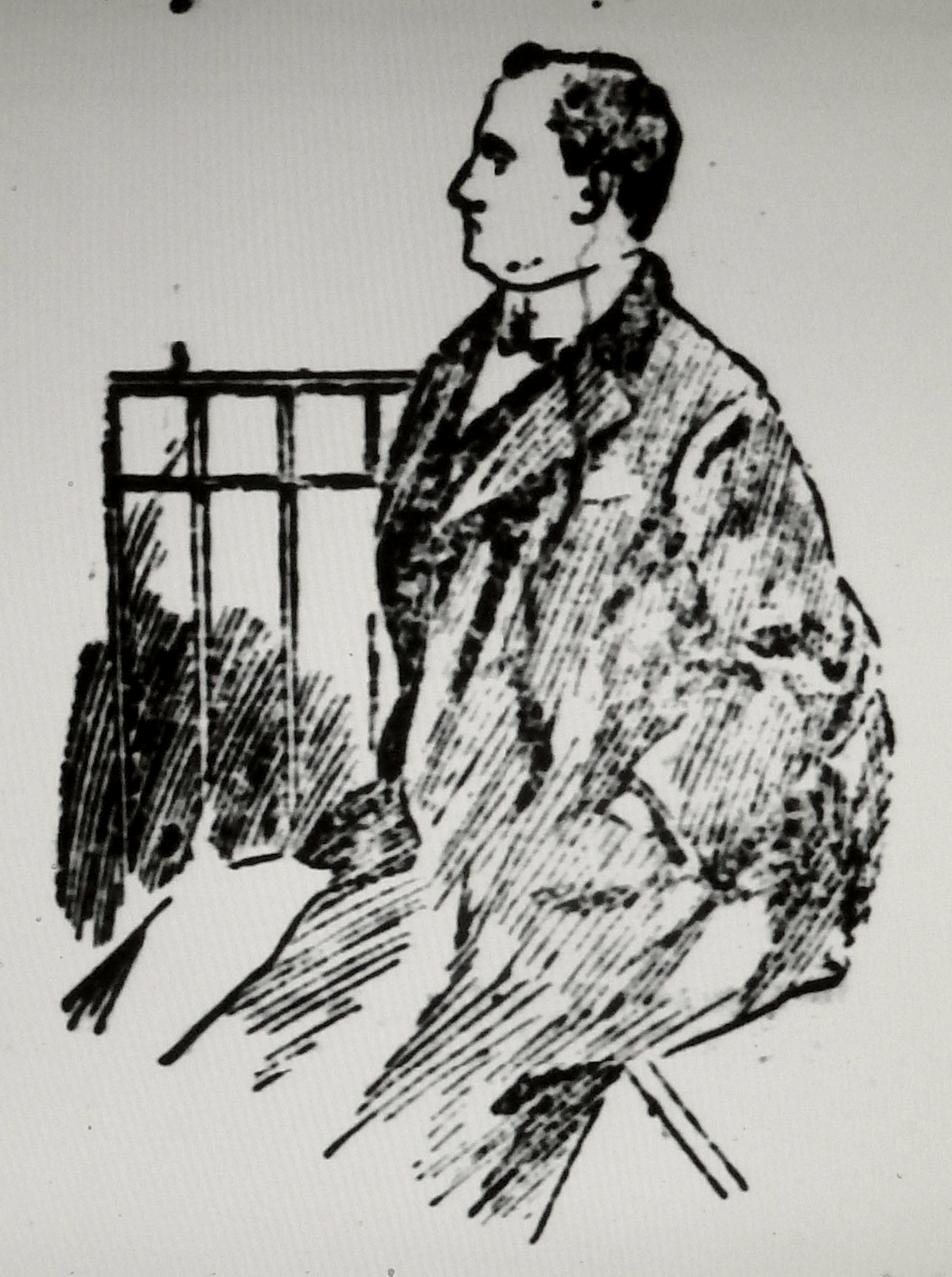
Nevill at Bow Street, January 1898

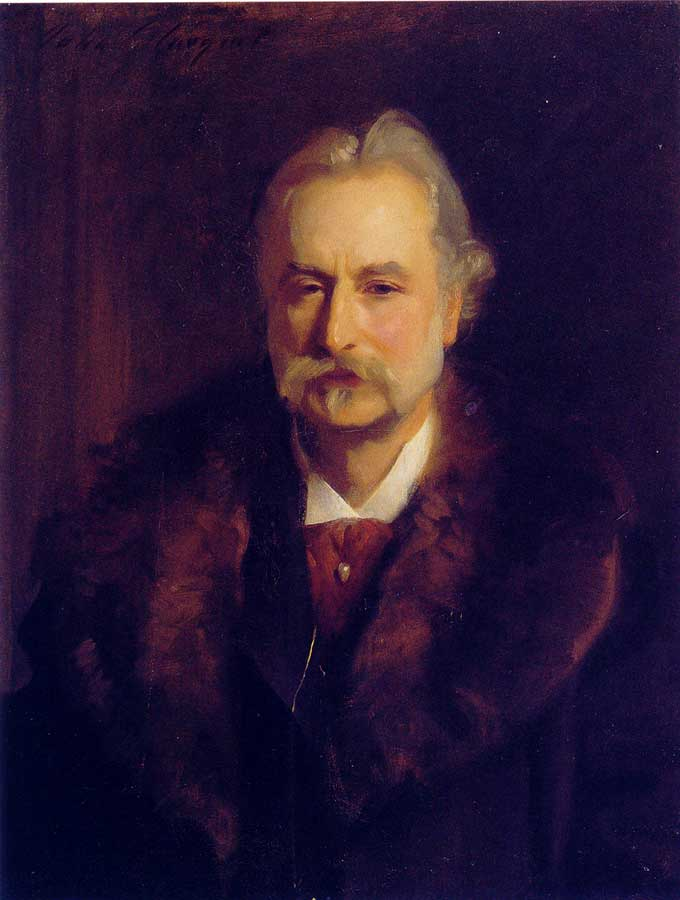
Sir George Lewis, 1896

At Nevill's first appearance at Bow Street in January 1898, having arrived post-haste from Paris to face the charge of fraud, The Herald reported that "[Nevill] created quite a sensation by his appearance at Bow-street this week, standing faultlessly attired in the dock, and frequently writing little notes to Sir George Lewis", his solicitor.

==== Second appearance, Bow Street ====
At his second appearance at Bow Street on 31 January 1898, Nevill was charged on remand by magistrate Sir John Bridge with "unlawfully, and with intent to defraud, by means of false and fraudulent pretences inducing Herbert Henry Spender Clay to write and affix his name to certain papers, in order that the same might be used as valuable securities". Nevill was committed for trial without bail. His securities were Colonel Gathorne-Hardy and Nevill's brother Lord Henry Nevill. The prosecution was represented by Horace Avory and Mr Sims of the Treasury. Sir George Lewis stood for the defence.

The East and South Devon Advertiser remarked,

The accused was looking much brighter and smarter than on the occasion of the previous hearing, when it was evident that he was still suffering from the effects of recent illness. He stepped into the dock with a light step, and took a commanding view of the court, being apparently in no way unnerved by his position ... There was a large number of ladies and gentlemen in the court – the Extradition Court – which, being small, was inconveniently crowded. Many of those present were personal friends of one or other of the parties directly concerned in the proceedings. There were also several Scotland-yard officers watching the case.

Avory said that "it seemed clear to him that the defendant had been guilty of forgery". However Justice North had said that "it was not a forgery fraudulently to induce a person to execute an instrument upon a misrepresentation of its contents", because Nevill had persuaded Spender-Clay to sign a document which was mostly covered up. Sir John Bridge considered this "a matter of great gravity ... in which a man of experience was charged with taking advantage of his experience to get money out of one who was practically only a boy". (Note: Spender-Clay's 21st birthday occurred a few days before the offence was committed) Nevill responded, "I am perfectly innocent of both these charges".

==== Third appearance, Old Bailey ====
Nevill appeared at the Old Bailey on 15 February 1898, in front of Justice Lawrance.

The defendant was brought up from below and advanced to the front of the dock, which he grasped tightly while standing upright and looking straight before him, throwing but one brief glance towards the ladies seated below the Bench ... The defendant, though outwardly calm, was labouring under suppressed excitement which he endeavoured to hide. He was dressed in a black morning coat and wore a high turned-down collar and black tie, and his general appearance was spruce. An attendant pushed forward a chair into which he readily subsided.

The Faringdon Advertiser commented: "Lord William Nevill is a tall, slim, clean-shaven man. He wore a dark overcoat and a black tie, and carried a silk hat in his right hand. He appeared quite at ease, and took a seat in the dock, permission having been obtained, as Sir George Lewis stated that he had been in bad health recently".

Nevill was charged with "forging and uttering promissory notes for £3,113 and £8,000, and with forging and uttering a request and authority for the same sums, and with the intent to defraud Samuel Lewis by inducing Henry Herbert Spencer Clay to sign certain papers which might be afterwards used as valuable securities". The prosecution included Horace Avory again, and the defence team was John Lawson Walton, QC, MP, Henry Charles Richards, MP and William Otto Adolph Julius Danckwerts. Nevill pleaded guilty only to misdemeanour. On this day, Spender-Clay was exonerated from the former High Court accusation of complicity, and the total sum of signed bills was settled at £17,000 (equivalent to £1,910,416 in 2025). In mitigation, Nevill's counsel Lawson Walton said in his closing speech:

... that there was a material distinction between the crime of forgery and misdemeanour of the class to which Lord William Nevill had pleaded guilty. Lord Wm Nevill, who undoubtedly obtained the signatures by deception, had come forward voluntarily to face the consequences of his act. He had made a full confession. He was in great financial difficulties at the time and did not properly realise that he was committing a breach of the law. He never intended that Mr Clay should suffer financially. He believed that the securities might remain in the hands of Mr Lewis until he got money from other quarters to meet his liabilities. Lord William Nevill had already suffered intensely by reason of his present position. He belonged to a family respected in all ranks of English life, and the suffering cast on his friends must have had a severe reaction on Lord William.

Lawson Walton's brave defence was soon undone when the court heard that Nevill had written a letter in December 1897 "in which he said Mr. Spender Clay ought to be made to pay the money, and that he hoped he would be made to pay". According to the Evening Herald Dublin, Justice Lawrance summed up that:

The offence was a grave one. It seemed to him useless to distinguish between the offence of which William Nevill had pleaded guilty and that of forgery. He had looked in vain for any circumstances of extenuation. The case was as bad a case of fraud as he could conceive. He sentenced the prisoner to five years' penal servitude.

However, the Buckingham Express reported a more severe reprimand by the judge:

In His Lordship's judgement, the crime was as great as if he had extracted this large sum from Mr. Clay's pocket, or had broken into Mr. Lewis's office and had stolen the money. There were absolutely no extenuating circumstances. Concluding an impressive address to the prisoner, the learned judge, amid profound silence, said: "You have brought dishonour upon an ancient and noble name, you have brought sorrow and suffering and shame upon those who are near and dear to you, you have forfeited the position which you held and which ought to have been a guarantee for your honesty at least, if not for your honour. Your crime has been great, and your punishment must be great also. I sentence you to five years' penal servitude". The announcement of the sentence created a great sensation in court. The prisoner was immediately removed from the dock.

Nevill "showed no emotion" in the dock, in response to the sentence. The Buckingham Express added: "Much sympathy will be felt with Lady William Nevill in this new and terrible catastrophe which has befallen her. It was only the other day that her mother, the Marquisa de Santurce, died suddenly and unexpectedly".

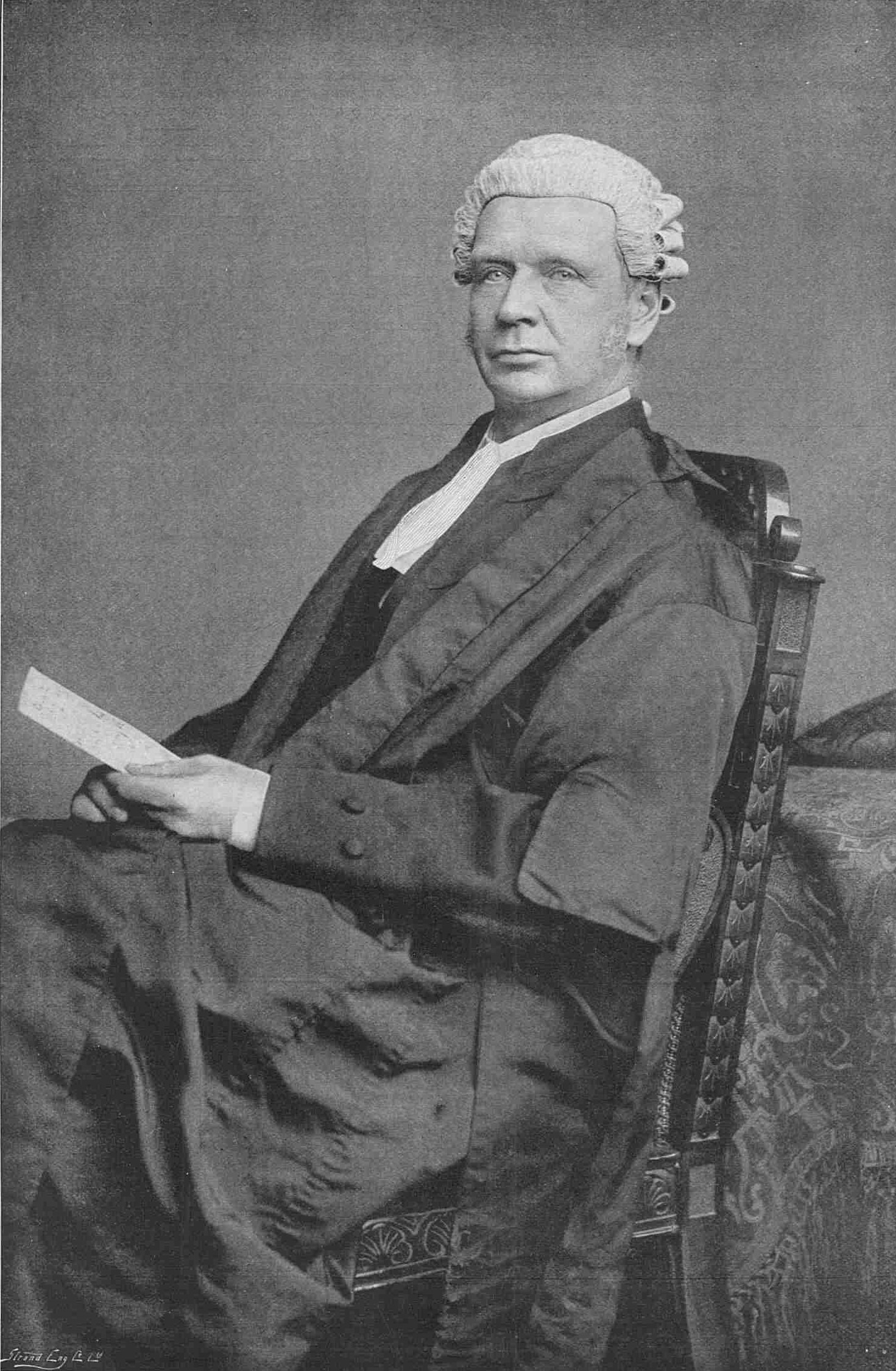
Justice Lowrance, 1896

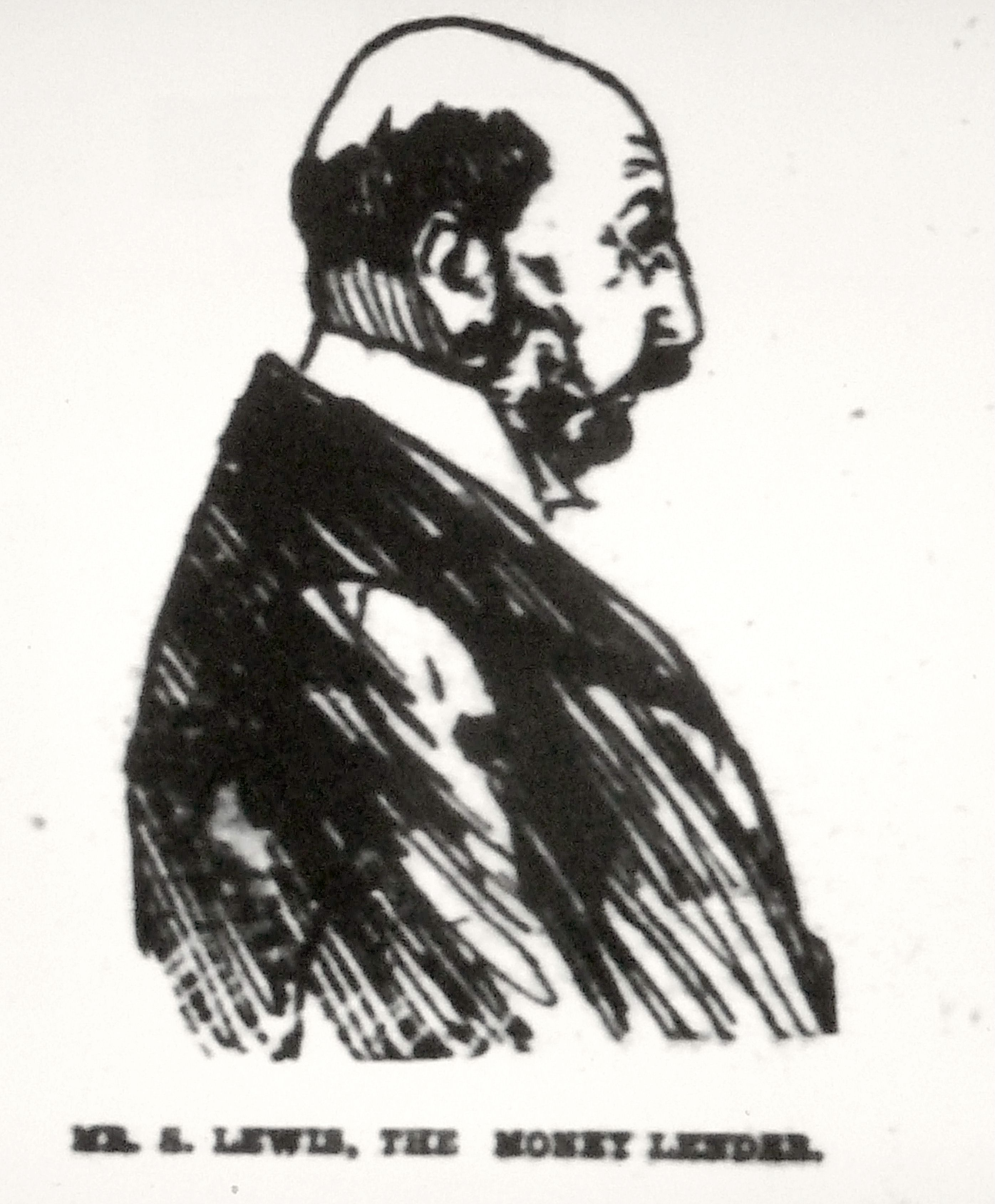
Moneylender Samuel Lewis, 1898

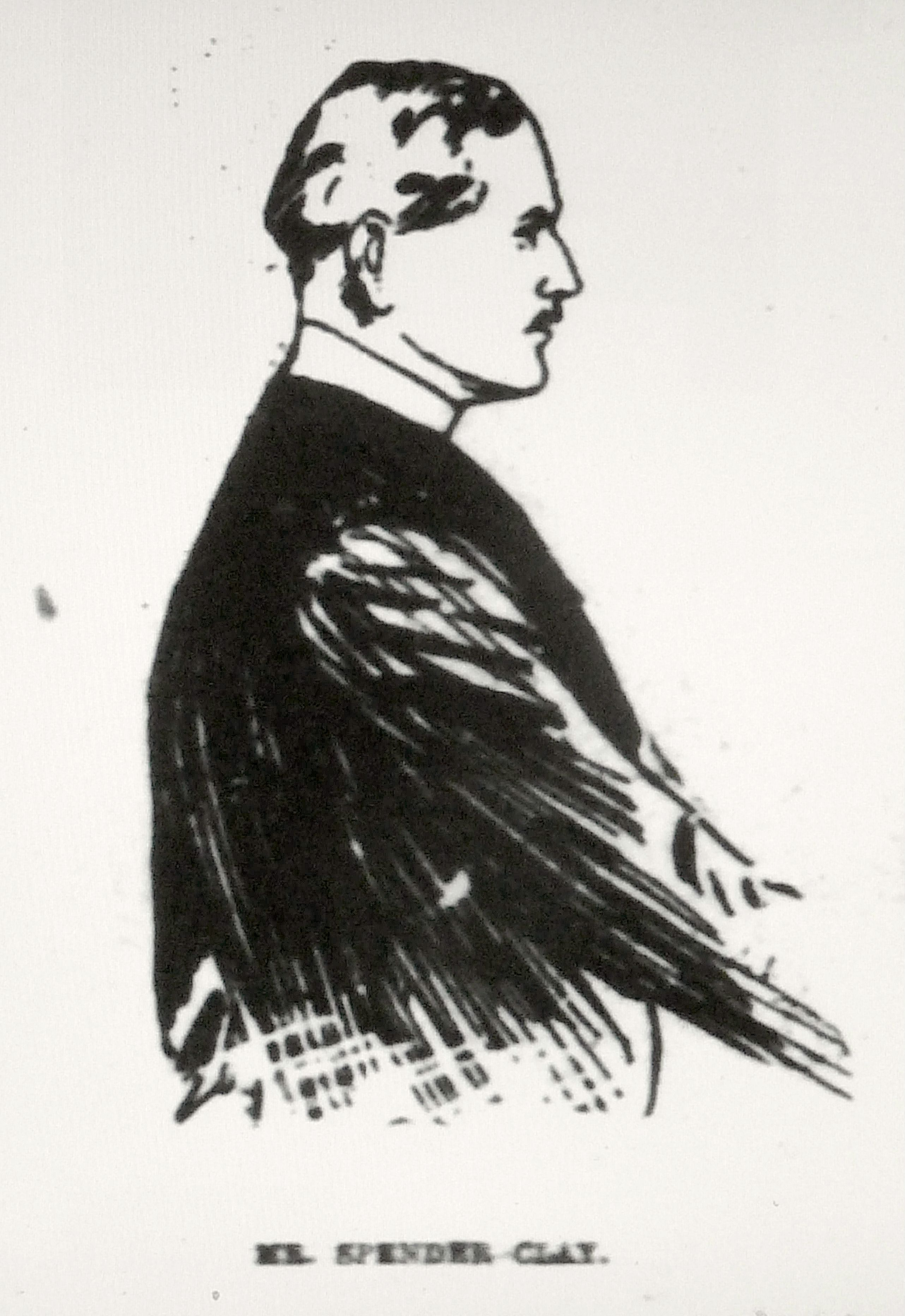
Second lieutenant Herbert Henry Spender-Clay, 1898

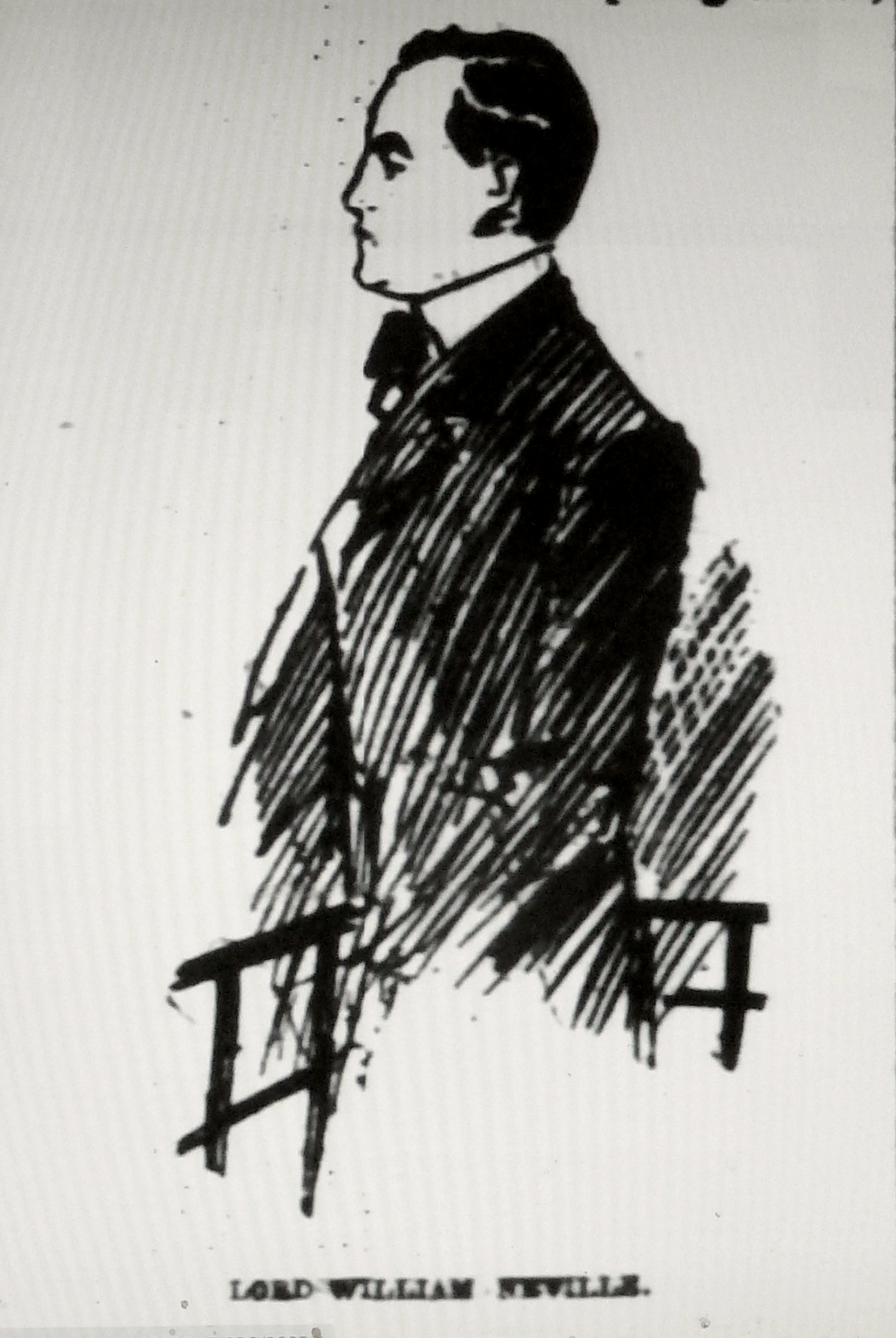
Lord William Beauchamp Nevill, 1898

=== Crown versus Nevill, 1907 ===
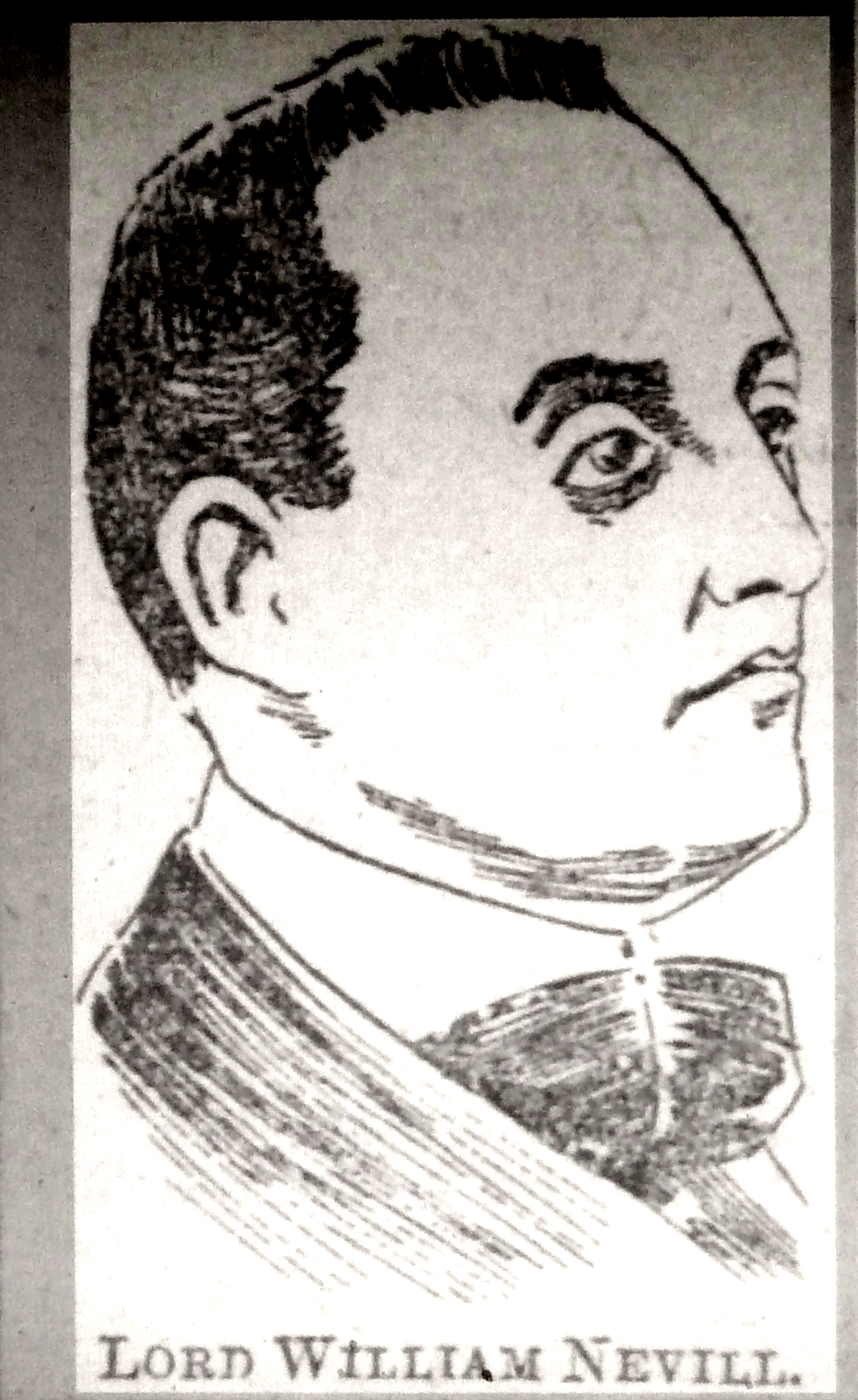
Nevill in court again, 1907

This was known as the Black Diamonds Case. (Note: "Black diamonds" is a humorous reference not to real black diamonds but to the coal which was substituted for the jewellery.) Nevill was committed for trial from Westminster Police court, then on 13 April 1907, he appeared before the Chairman of Clerkenwell Sessions, Robert Wallace KC and a "full bench of country magistrates" on a charge of theft. "The court was crowded, and many fashionably-dressed women were present". "Lord William was at the court in good time ... carefully groomed and neatly dressed he was unmistakably an aristocrat. He wore a double-breasted blue suit, with a light waistcoat, showing beneath the breast opening, and presented a lavish display of tie. Over his arm he carried a light ulster. His dark hair was neatly brushed back from his forehead, which was seamed with the wrinkles of intense anxiety. His slight moustache was almost grey".

On 31 October 1906, at his house in Eaton Place, London, Nevill had induced a Chelsea jeweller and pawnbroker Alfred William Fitch, of Miller & Fitch, to place £400-worth of Nevill's jewellery in a sealed box as security for a loan from Fitch to Nevill, Nevill having himself prepared a similar sealed box containing coals. Then Nevill surreptitiously swapped the jewellery box for the box of coals. The jewellery items included: "a diamond and emerald ring, a pearl necklace, two diamond and sapphire rings, a diamond half-hoop ring, a diamond necklace, a diamond pendant and a valuable diamond and pearl ornament". The next day, Nevill pledged five of the pieces of jewellery with pawnbroker Mr Attenborough of Buckingham Palace Road. Although Nevill redeemed the five pieces on 26 February, they and the rest of the jewellery "vanished". On 8 March, Fitch opened his box and found the coals.

When arrested by Chief Inspector Drew, Nevill said, "What did you want to open the box for? For God's sake don't do that [meaning charge him] for the sake of my wife. I was coming round in a day or two to give you the money". Called as a witness in court, Nevill's wife said that she usually paid off Nevill's debts because she had an income, "derived from mines and land in Spain and interests in the firm of Murietta & Co.", and Nevill had none, "other than that which she gave him", and that she could have redeemed the pledge on this occasion if she had known earlier. The debt to Fitch was paid by her in March. "The prisoner ... only once betrayed any emotion, and that was when his wife appeared in court. He covered his face with his hands and wept". Nevertheless, after two minutes' deliberation, the jury pronounced the defendant guilty, and Nevill was sentenced to one year's imprisonment, with hard labour.

== Imprisonments, illness and death ==
The 1901 census finds Nevill in Parkhurst prison. While he was imprisoned, his wife "stood by him, and visited him often", and on "every possible occasion". Nevill was discharged on 8 November 1901, having completed three years, nine months. Following his release, "he lived quietly and little was heard of him". Nevill was a "particularly active man", but then he fell from a bus in 1929 and fractured his femur, and he "was afterwards almost a cripple". He suffered "intense pain" and lived in retirement for the rest of his life. He died in Bramham, West Riding of Yorkshire, on 12 May 1939.

== Publication ==
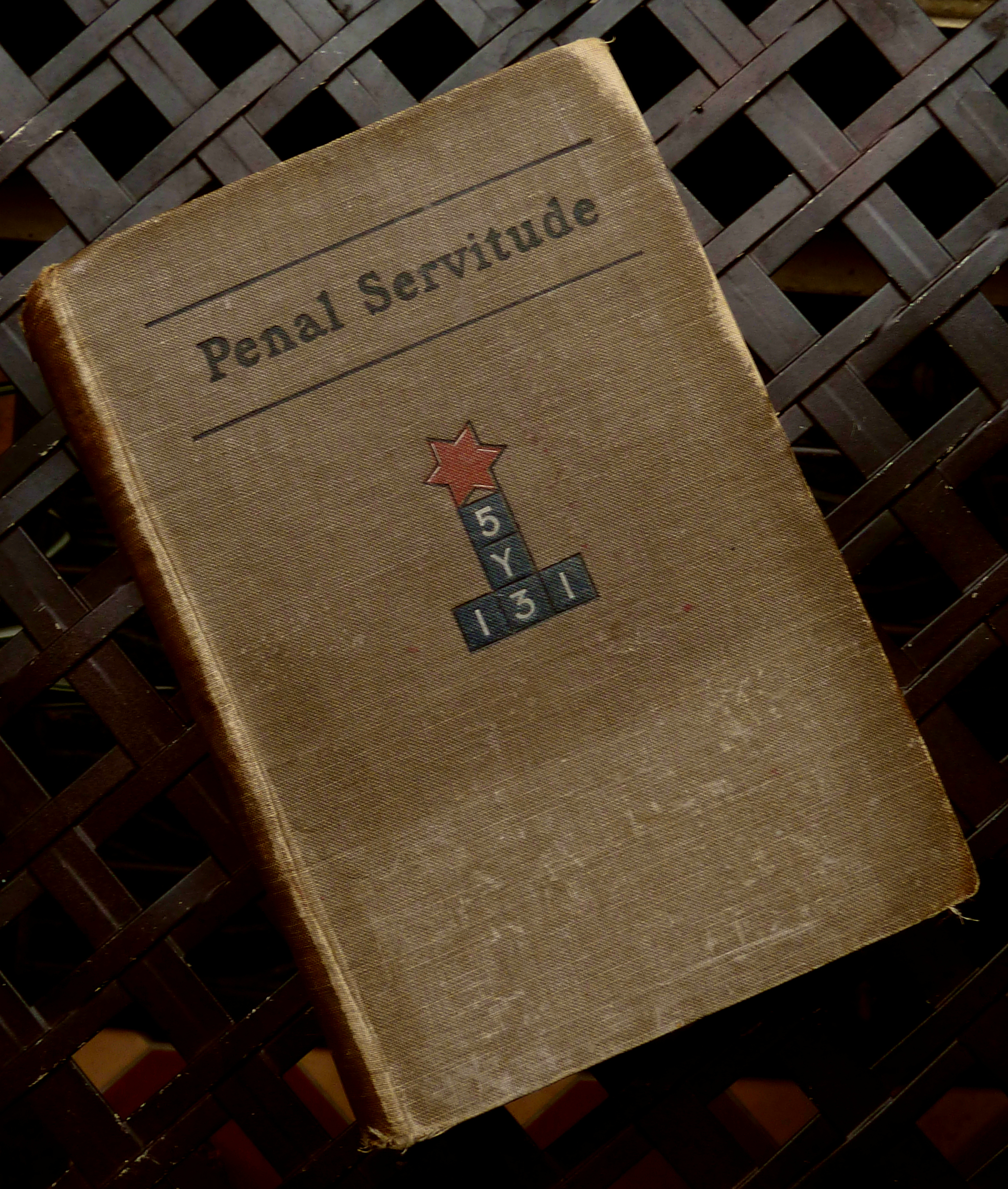
Penal Servitude, 1st edition

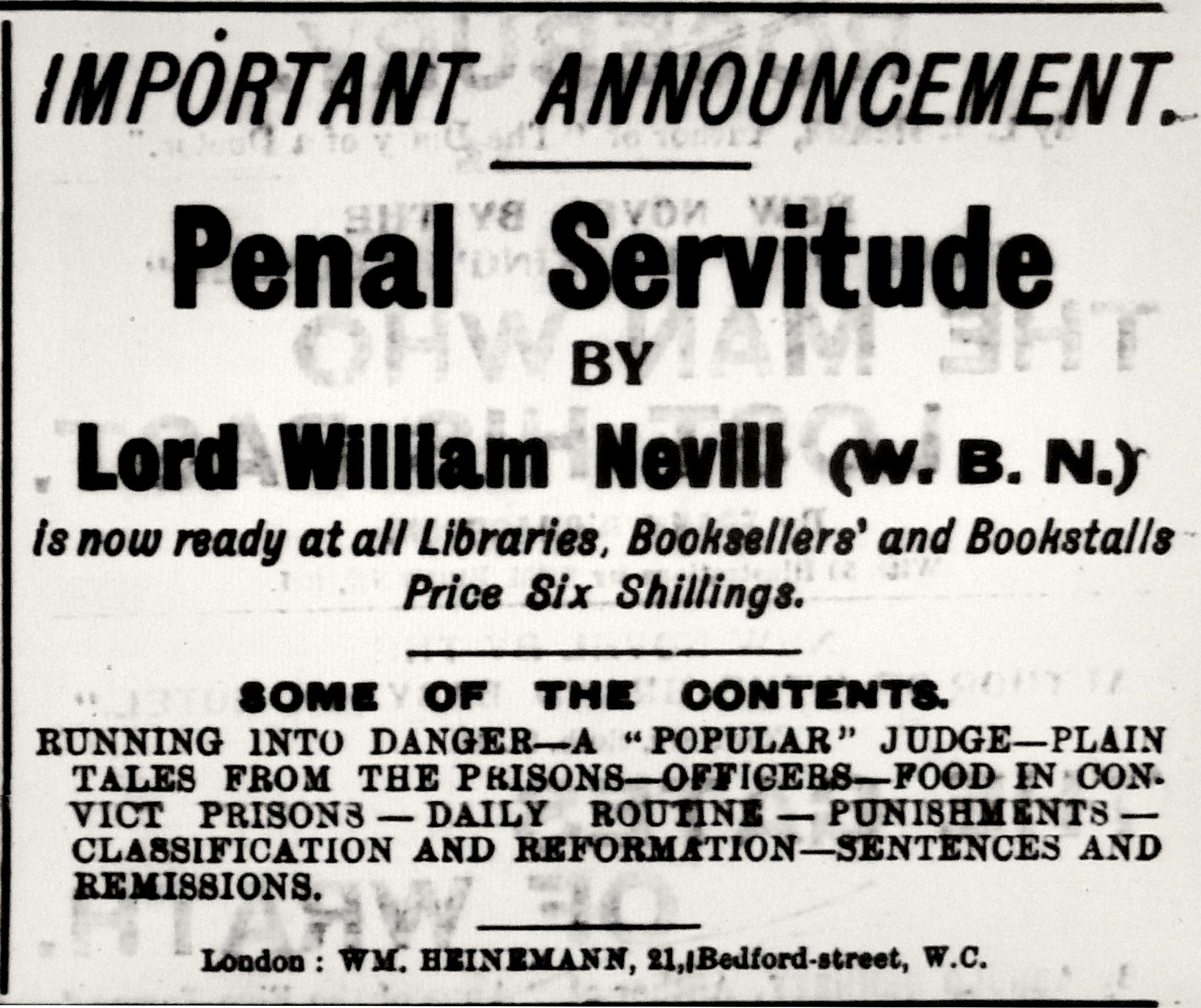
1903 ad for Penal Servitude, at 6 shillings (equivalent to £31.54 in 2025)

- Nevill, Lord William Beauchamp (28 January 1903). Penal Servitude. London: William Heinemann. (Note: Penal Servitude (1903) was originally published under the pseudonym W.B.N. There are several current reprints of this book)

=== Reviews ===
(Note: In this section: normal font = quotations from reviewers; italics = quotations from Nevill's book, given by reviewers; square brackets = the Wikipedia editor's paraphrase or clarification of sections of the review.)
The above publication received much attention from the Press; the following is a selection from those reviews.

- "Lord William Nevill ... in a prefatory par[agraph] says: If by publishing [these notes] I can in the least degree ameliorate the lot of any of those with whom I came into such unfortunate contact, the additional publicity which this [book] gives to my own imprisonment will seem to me not a useless sacrifice. ... There were special reasons which those acquainted with the convict's family connections will understand, why he was not sent to Lewes ... He never felt any repulsion from any kind of prison work. From the beginning he made up his mind to do what he was told to do, and he found that was the best way ... being naturally what Dr Johnson calls a clubbable man, by which I suppose, he meant gregarious and sympathetic, I had an esprit de corps towards, and a real liking for many of the men, quite regardless of their crimes. I believe that clubbability is an innate quality of Englishmen, and that it asserts itself in a convict prison just as much, allowing for circumstances, as it does elsewhere ... While condemning violent prisoners and approving of the cat, the writer remarks that the fact that some prisoners are literally driven to death is proved by the suicides ... The prisoners ... have a code of classification of crime, and we hear that all blackmailers are looked down upon by their fellow-prisoners .. [A complaining prisoner is told that he is "not at the Hotel Cecil", to which he replies,] " I am better off here than I should be there ... I have nothing to pay here, and I have a lord in waiting". [After leaving Parkhurst, Nevill visits the family of one of his convict friends, and is made welcome.] He discusses the question of ... reformation, and in view of the various improvements which have taken place ... he says that no one need despair of the prospect of penal reform in the future .. he thinks that a system of graduated remissions might be applied .. It is grossly unfair that in the matter of remission first offenders should be treated in exactly the same way as habitual criminals. When he came out of prison ... he made up his mind that the only thing to do was to face the world with eyes straight to the point, leaving it to everyone who might wish to recognise him to make the first advance ... some of them kindly nodded and spoke to me, others put on a glassy look ... Fair weather friends are not worth the keeping ... The unwavering fidelity of those whose goodwill I prize most has more than made up for the coldness of others. Irish Daily Independent and Nation, 28 January 1903.
- "Whatever opinion may be entertained regarding the taste displayed by its author in issuing a work of this description, it certainly contains not a little interesting reading. The writer deals with prison life in all its phases, and some of its criticisms and suggestions seem well worthy of consideration – the more so from the fact that he writes in general in a moderate spirit, and bears testimony to the good intentions inspiring, as a rule, the existing arrangements. But now and again, of course, a harsh or unjust official is encountered ... a boy of sixteen or seventeen [was given] two days' starvation and eleven days' extra imprisonment for the heinous crime of trying to feed the sparrows ... In his chapter on prison food the author lays particular stress on the needless suffering caused by the withholding of green vegetables in spite of the repeated recommendations to the contrary of official committees ... Of his fellow convicts the author tells some remarkable stories ... [an] incorrigible scoundrel doing time for homicide [causes offence to the author, who contrives to scald the man with boiling water] ... Penal Servitude is a volume certain to be widely read". Westminster Gazette, 28 January 1903.
- "When next the House of Commons takes up the question of reform in the administration of our convict prisons, it will not want advice from what ought to be the best of all sources – that of men who have had the misfortune to undergo the hardships necessarily associated with penal servitude. [Nevil served seven weeks in Wormwood Scrubs, then moved to Parkhurst on the Isle of Wight, at first in the prison hospital due to an internal complaint and then the infirmary where he was an orderly from November 1898 to May 1899. For the rest of his first nine months he served in separate confinement, where he exercised one hour per day, and otherwise worked at knitting stockings in his cell,] which almost anyone can learn in a few lessons, and which, after a while, becomes rather absorbing. There is just enough thought required to keep the mind partly engaged; and as the knitter can walk or sit, or work in almost any attitude, he gets a certain amount of change. [He was then transferred to the first offenders' group, and worked with them on the prison farm, preferring the carting jobs, not minding whether he drove a horse or pulled the cart himself, saying, At least we were never whipped. Between the summer and autumn of 1899 he was back in hospital and knitting again, then put to work in the printing and bookbinding rooms, for nearly two years until the end of his sentence.] I liked being in the printers' party very much indeed. The only serious drawback was the small amount of exercise one got. [The book] deals ... at length with points of reform. [The author praises the warders, but] gives abundant details in support of the assertion that the food was not only insufficient but often bad. What with bad meat, bad potatoes and bad bread, the prisoners too often had to do their work on empty stomachs, while many of them fell sick from it ... Nevill appears to have borne his punishment very philosophically ... It is a pity that he has stooped almost to the level of Billingsgate in writing of the distinguished judge who sentenced him ... The book is generally moderately and sensibly written, and should prove helpful to all interested in prison administration or discipline". The Scotsman, 29 January 1903.
- A journalist from The Sketch said that "the interesting book by W.B.N. ... [had] attracted so much attention" that he spent two days "in and about" Dartmoor Prison to see "something of its inner life", but did not find it lacking.The Sketch, 11 February 1903.
- "The most engrossing book that I have read for months ... Were it not for the fact that the author writes from the point of view of a prisoner, one might almost suppose that he had been specially selected by the Government for the task of examining closely into our prison system, with a view to a thorough reform ... He sets himself earnestly to point out defects and to suggest remedies for them ... Those interested in prison reform will find Penal Servitude one of the most interesting as well as one of the most useful works upon the subject that have been issued for some considerable time". Keble Howard in The Sketch, 11 February 1903.
- Major A. Griffiths, former inspector of prisons, shares a long list of positive quotations from Nevill's book, about the excellence of prison warders and the way that prisons were run. Nevill's criticisms he declares to be minor points, for example, according to Griffiths, "The exception [to the prison governors liked by Nevill] is well-known as an upright, honourable gentleman whose offence seems to have been a too-rigid interpretation of his duties and a certain curtness of speech, with possibly the neglect of social amenities in dealing with his sensitive charges". In response to Nevill's strong words about the cruelty of the isolation cell, Griffiths says, "The separation, or more exactly the segregation, of prisoners has been largely due to the desire to check evil and indiscriminate association, the deteriorating influence of the worst elements ..." and to keep "first offenders ... strictly apart" for that same reason; otherwise the isolation cell was no longer used. Griffiths attributes Nevill's criticisms of the system to the author being "so shut in and circumscribed, so closely beset by irksome rules, so absolutely denied all independence, that he is for ever at odds with his keepers and the treatment he receives". Griffiths accepts the complaint about food, but questions whether the food was always as Nevill described, and answers that, "after all prison diet must be wholesome and sufficient as evidenced by the general appearance of those it nourishes". He says, "My chief quarrel with this book is its pretentiousness ... A prisoner cannot obviously be in possession of facts to entitle him to speak with authority". Griffiths gives the example of the boy overly-punished for feeding birds, saying that "[Nevill] could not, and did not, know that this man had repeatedly misconducted himself previously". He closes by saying, "With all this it may be willingly conceded that the writer, although often erroneous and occasionally self-sufficient, took his punishment on the whole like a man". Major Arthur Griffiths, former H.M. inspector of prisons, in The Tatler, 18 March 1903.
- "The writer ... gives his view on Penal Servitude in a manner which proves effectually that he is a thoughtful and observant man. The early chapters take the form of an apologia, but we are not concerned here with the justice or injustice of his sentence. The book is an honest attempt to ameliorate the condition of prisoners and it is as readable as it is well-intentioned. Humanitarianism has done a great deal already. but some of the reforms suggested by W.B.N. seem feasible and would probably do more good than harm. He suggests, for instance, that the period of solitary confinement should be curtailed and he remarks with no little justice that "many of the capital cases show outrageous inequality and justice." It is pleasing to notice, that on the whole, he has nothing but praise for the officials who are responsible for prison discipline. The book is singularly free of all exaggerations or accounts of prison horrors so frequently inserted to make a work more saleable. W.B.N. writes calmly and almost judiciously, and at the sametime (sic) his writing is more interesting than many novels". Englishman's Overland Mail 30 April 1903
- "When he was transferred to Parkhurst he had to begin with nine months' separate confinement – one hour a day exercise and the other 23 hours alone in his cell. He wrote of this: The solitude and hopeless monotony, without anything to think of but the long years of suffering and disgrace ahead, produces nervous irritation, approaching in some cases a frenzy, and instead of softening a man, brings out all the evil there is in him. It was stated that the book yielded ... about £300 (equivalent to £31,203 in 2025), which went to creditors. The Scotsman, 15 May 1939.
- "Lord William likened seven weeks in Wormwood Scrubs to seven years, and declared that if he had not been visited by a priest at the critical moment he would have smashed everything in the cell. He thought that solitary confinement brought out all the evil in a man. He was a model prisoner and never incurred a penalty". Ballymena Weekly Telegraph, 20 May 1939.
