= Eridge Park =

Village and Park in Rotherfield, East Sussex, England

Coordinates: 51.088°N 0.248°E

- Site of Special Scientific Interest
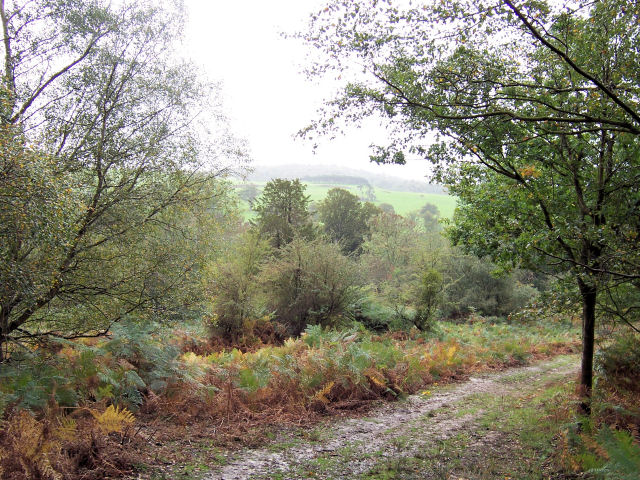
- Location of Eridge Park.
- Area of search: East Sussex
- Grid reference: TQ 575 345
- Interest: Biological
- Area: 396.8 hectares (981 acres)
- Notification date: 1986
- Location map: Magic Map

Eridge Park (/ˈɛrɪdʒ/) is a village and historic park located north of the parish of Rotherfield, to the north-east of Crowborough in East Sussex, England. The adjoining home of the same name is the seat of the Marquess of Abergavenny. The area is a biological Site of Special Scientific Interest.

== History ==
The name Eridge derives from 'Eagle ridge', or 'ridge frequented by eagles'.

Eridge was the seat (main home) of the Earls and Marquesses of Abergavenny. In 1792 Henry Nevill, 2nd Earl of Abergavenny converted the old Eridge House into a Gothic castle, which he named Eridge Castle. The castle was replaced by a neo-Georgian mansion in the 1930s, which was itself partially demolished 30 years later, when the guest wing was replaced by a large circular swimming pool. As a 20th-century structure on an ancient site, the house is not a listed building.

== Parkland and woodland ==
The area is, with Eridge Green, a 396.8-hectare (981-acre) biological Site of Special Scientific Interest. It is a Nature Conservation Review site, Grade I, and is Grade II^{*} listed on the Register of Historic Parks and Gardens of Special Historic Interest in England.

Eridge Park's undulating parkland is densely wooded to its north (Whitehill Wood) and south (Saxonbury Hill). The site includes gardens, parkland, and ancient woodland. It is of national importance for its lichens, with 167 recorded species in one of the richest epiphytic lichen floras of any park in Britain. It is also of interest for its 22 species of dragonflies and 60 species of breeding birds.

== Village and surroundings ==
Eridge Park is directly north of Rotherfield, and largely overlaps the ecclesiastical parish of Eridge Green. Eridge Castle, the predecessor property, had its own ecclesiastical parish until 1856.

On the village street of Eridge Park is the church, which is Grade II listed, and six other listed buildings including the public house and the Nevill Crest and Gun.

The area also contains several follies, including the Saxonbury Tower and several ornamental buildings near the Sham Farm industrial estate. Sham Farm, an arable farm, gets its name from a wall built there to hide imposing farm buildings, which was intended to make the farm look like a very large house when viewed from Eridge Castle.
