= William Nevill, 1st Marquess of Abergavenny =

British peer (1826–1915)

The Most Honourable The Marquess of Abergavenny KG MVO JP
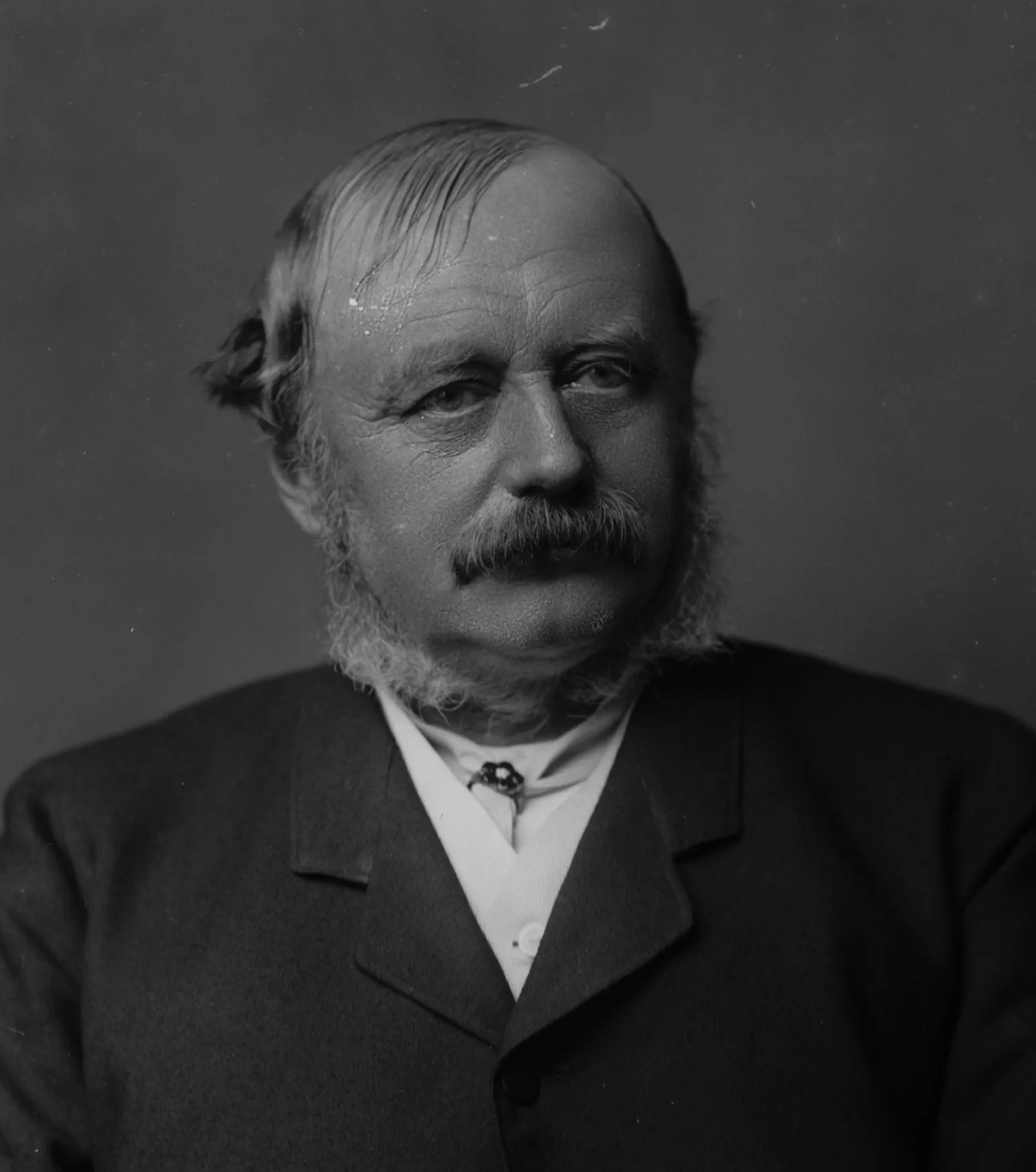
- Portrait by Alexander Bassano, c. 1884

Lord Lieutenant of Sussex
- In office 1892–1905
- Preceded by: The Viscount Hampden
- Succeeded by: The Duke of Norfolk

Personal details
- Born: 16 September 1826 Longford, Shropshire
- Died: 12 December 1915 (aged 89) Rotherfield, East Sussex
- Spouse: Caroline Vanden-Bempdé Johnstone
- Children: 10
- Parent(s): William Nevill, 4th Earl of Abergavenny; Caroline Leeke
- Education: Eton College

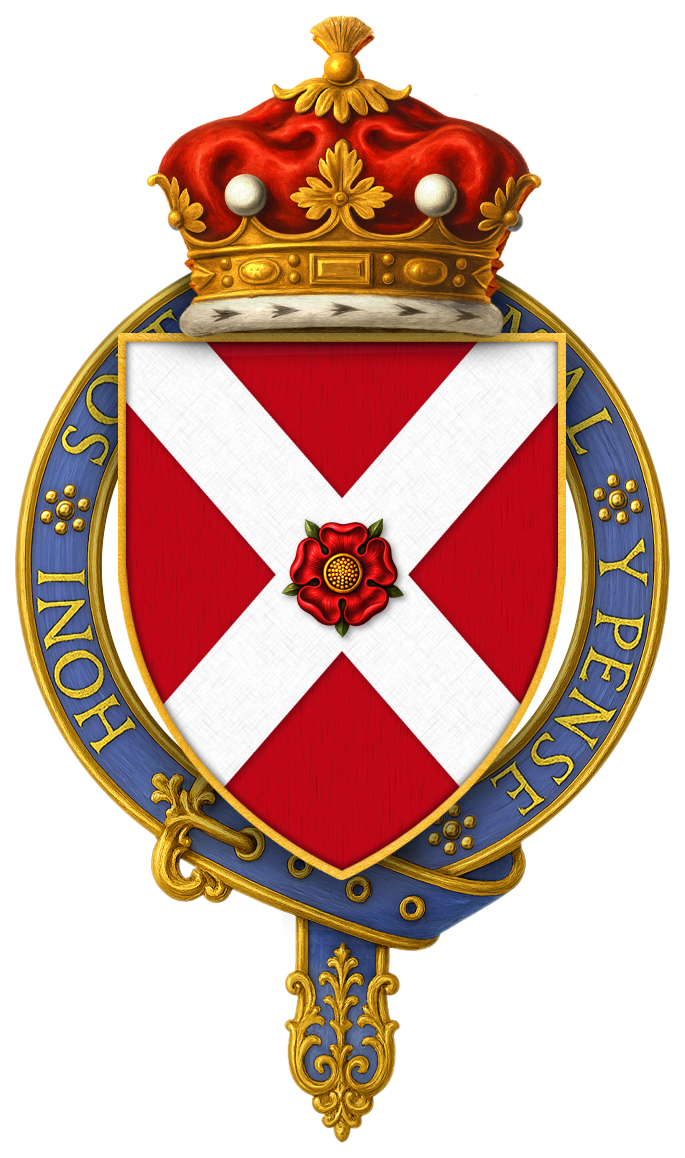
Garter encircled shield of arms of William Nevill, 1st Marquess of Abergavenny, KG, as displayed on his Order of the Garter stall plate in St. George's Chapel, viz. Gules on a saltire argent a rose of the field barbed and seeded proper.

William Nevill, 1st Marquess of Abergavenny (16 September 1826 – 12 December 1915), styled Viscount Neville between 1845 and 1868 and known as The Earl of Abergavenny between 1868 and 1876, was a British peer.

== Background and education ==
He was born on 16 September 1826 at Longford and baptised there on 19 September. Nevill was the eldest son of William Nevill, 4th Earl of Abergavenny, by Caroline Leeke, daughter of Ralph Leeke, of Longford Hall, Shropshire. Among his siblings were Lady Caroline Emily Nevill (an early photographer), Lady Henrietta Augusta Nevill (a philanthropist and artist who married Hon. Thomas Lloyd-Mostyn), Lady Isabel Mary Frances Nevill (who married the Rev. Hon. Edward Vesey Bligh) and Hon. Ralph Pelham Nevill.

He was educated at Eton.

== Career ==
Nevill purchased a commission as cornet and sub-lieutenant in the 2nd Life Guards on 23 July 1844, but retired from the Army in June 1847. On 12 May 1849, he was commissioned a lieutenant in the West Kent Yeomanry. He resigned in May 1852. On 2 August 1852, he was appointed a deputy lieutenant of Sussex.

Lord Abergavenny was appointed honorary Colonel of the West Kent Yeomanry on 17 February 1875, and, from 28 September 1901, honorary Colonel of the Sussex Yeomanry. He was also a justice of the peace for Kent and Monmouthshire. He succeeded his father in the earldom in 1868. On 14 January 1876 he was created Earl of Lewes, in the County of Sussex, and Marquess of Abergavenny, in the County of Monmouth. He was further honoured when he was made a Knight of the Garter in 1886.

== Personal life ==
On 2 May 1848, Lord Abergavenny married Caroline Vanden-Bempde-Johnstone (1826–1892) at St George's, Hanover Square. Caroline was a daughter of Sir John Vanden-Bempde-Johnstone, 2nd Baronet and Louisa Augusta Venables-Vernon-Harcourt (a daughter of Edward Venables-Vernon-Harcourt, Archbishop of York). They had ten children:

- Lady Cicely Louisa Nevill (1851–1932), who married Col. the Hon. Charles Gathorne-Hardy, a son of Gathorne Gathorne-Hardy, 1st Earl of Cranbrook.
- Reginald William Bransby Nevill, 2nd Marquess of Abergavenny (1853–1927)
- Henry Gilbert Ralph Nevill, 3rd Marquess of Abergavenny (1854–1938)
- Lord George Montacute Nevill (1856–1920), married Florence Soanes and had issue, including Guy Larnach-Nevill, 4th Marquess of Abergavenny.
- Lady Alice Maud Nevill (1858–1898), who married Colonel Henry Morland.
- Lord William Beauchamp Nevill (1860–1939), who married Luisa del Campo Mello; he was charged with fraud in a 1898 court case, and wrote Penal Servitude (1903).
- Lord Richard Plantagenet Nevill (1862–1939), tall and thin, "Dicky" Nevill was the highly regarded and popular ADC to an Australian Governor-general and several Governors of Victoria. He died unmarried.
- Lady Idina Mary Nevill (1865–1951), who married Thomas Brassey, 2nd Earl Brassey.
- Lady Rose Nevill (1866–1913), who married Kenelm Pepys, 4th Earl of Cottenham, and had issue.
- Lady Violet Nevill (1866–1910), who married Henry Wellesley, 3rd Earl Cowley, and had issue.

The Marchioness of Abergavenny died at Eridge Castle on 13 September 1892, aged 66, and was buried there. Lord Abergavenny died on 12 December 1915 at Eridge Castle, aged 89, and was buried there on 16 December. He was succeeded in the marquessate by his eldest son, Reginald.

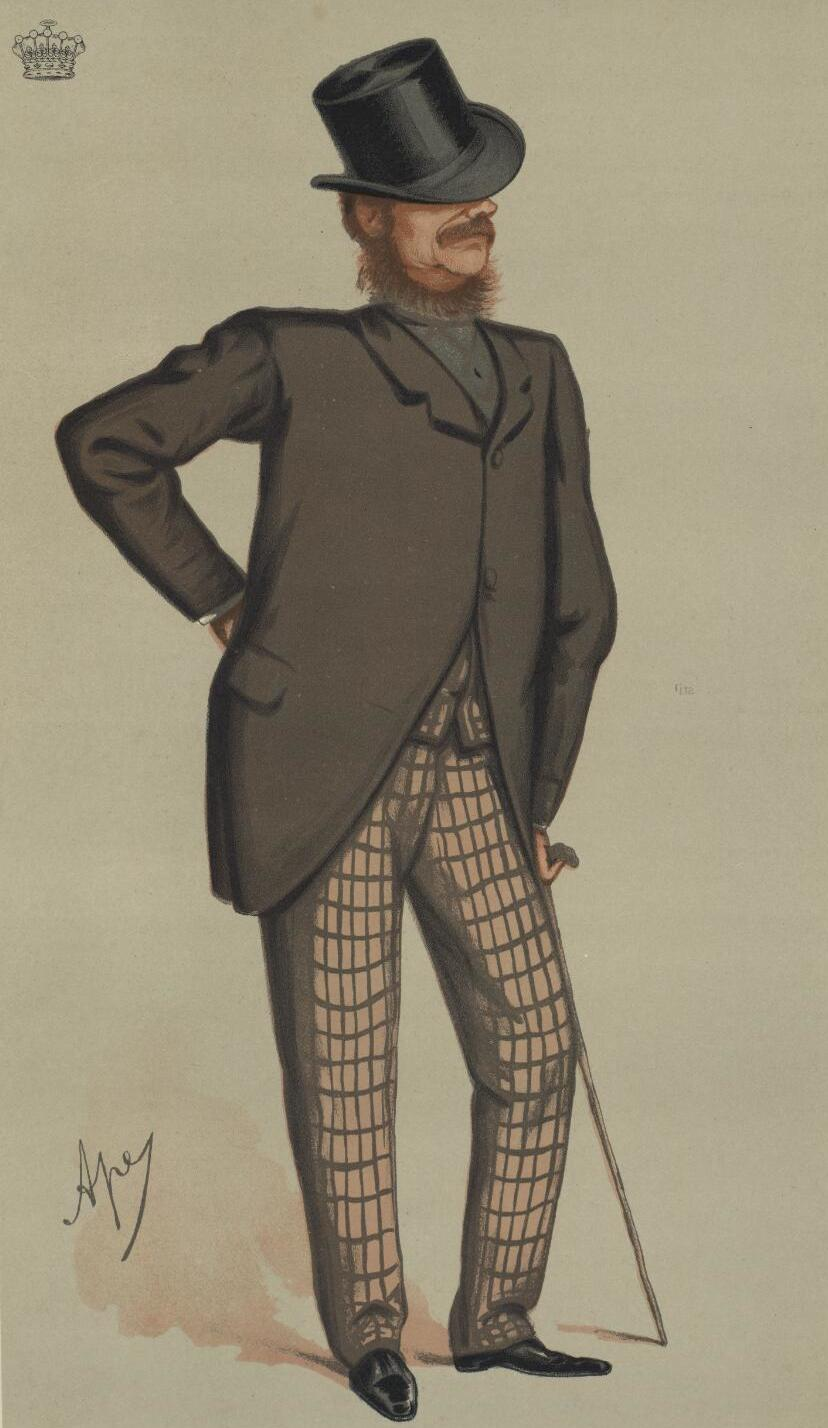
The Tory bloodhound, caricature of Lord Abergavenny by Ape (Vanity Fair, 1875)

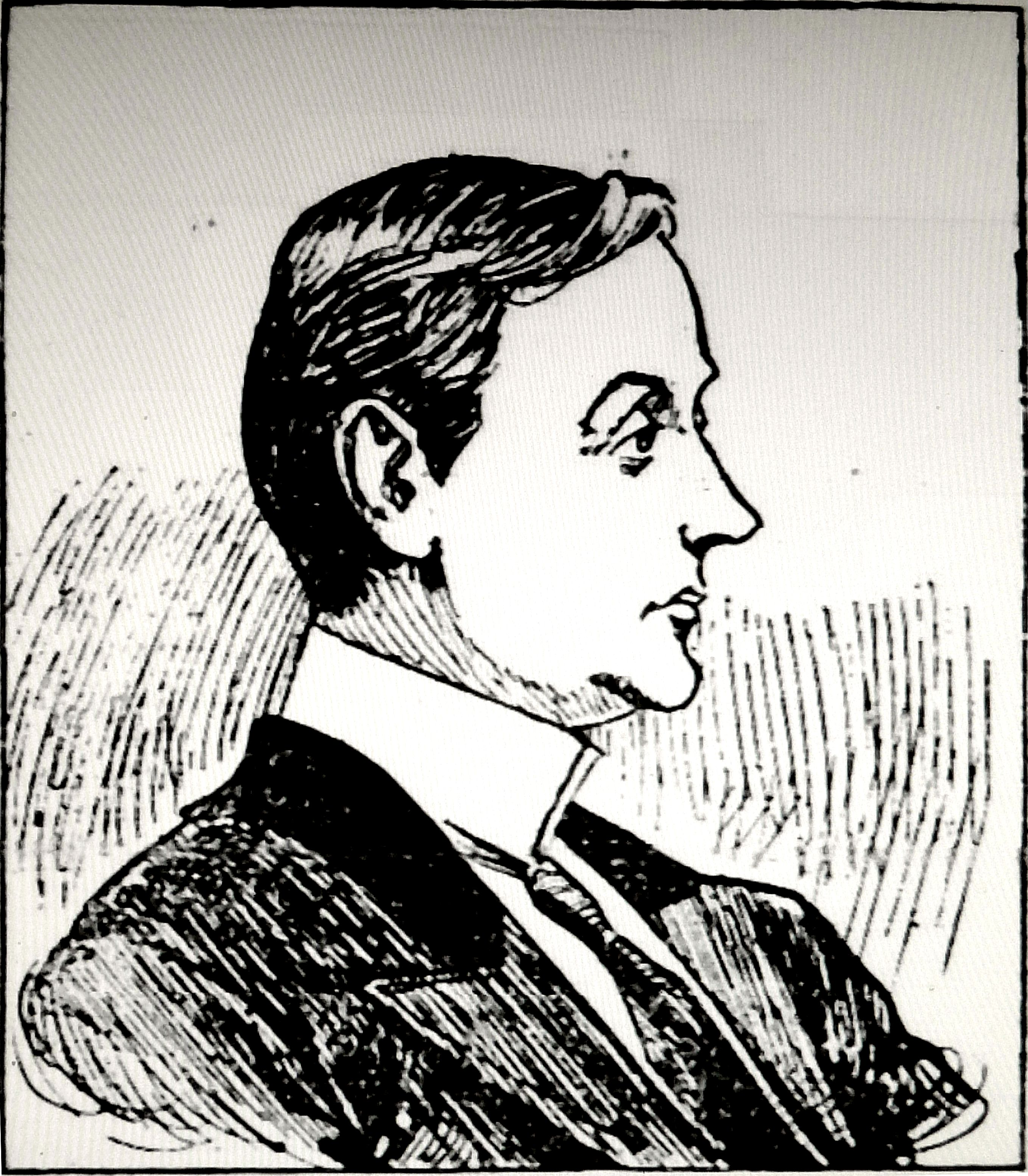
William Beauchamp Nevill (1860–1939), son of William Nevill, 1st Marquess

== Arms ==
Coat of arms of William Nevill, 1st Marquess of Abergavenny
Crest Out of a ducal coronet or a bull’s head proper, charged with a rose gules. Escutcheon Gules a saltire argent, charged with a rose of the field, barbed and seeded proper. Supporters On either side a bull argent, pied sable, armed, unguled, collared and chained or, the latter terminating in a staple or. Motto Ne vile velis (Form no mean wish). Orders The Most Noble Order of the Garter - Knight Companion (KG). Badge A rose gules, barbed and seeded proper.

== Notes ==
Honorary titles
Preceded by The Viscount Hampden	Lord Lieutenant of Sussex; 1892–1905	Succeeded by The Duke of Norfolk
Peerage of the United Kingdom
New creation	Marquess of Abergavenny; 1876–1915	Succeeded by Reginald Nevill
Peerage of Great Britain
Preceded by William Nevill	Earl of Abergavenny; 1868–1915	Succeeded by Reginald Nevill
