= Guy Larnach-Nevill, 4th Marquess of Abergavenny =

British peer (1883–1954)

The Most Honourable The Marquess of Abergavenny DL JP
- Marquess of Abergavenny
- Gules, a saltire argent charged with a rose of the field (barbed and seeded proper)
- Tenure: 10 January 1938 – 30 March 1954
- Successor: John Nevill, 5th Marquess of Abergavenny
- Other titles: 8th Earl of Abergavenny; 4th Earl of Lewes; 8th Viscount Nevill
- Born: 15 July 1883; Frant, Sussex
- Died: 30 March 1954 (aged 70)
- Residence: Eridge Park
- Spouse: Isabel Nellie Larnach
- Issue: Angela Isabel Nellie Nevill; John Henry Guy Nevill; Lord Rupert Nevill
- Parents: Lord George Montacute Nevill; Florence Mary Soanes

Major Guy Temple Montacute Larnach-Nevill, 4th Marquess of Abergavenny, JP, DL (15 July 1883 – 30 March 1954) was a British peer.

Guy was born at Saxonbury Lodge, Frant, Sussex, the eldest son of Lord George Montacute Nevill and his wife Florence Mary Soanes.

He married Isabel Nellie Larnach (d. 5 November 1953), the only child of James Walker Larnach, on 30 October 1909, and had three children:

- Lady Angela Isabel Nellie Nevill (1910–1980), who married the Digby Pepys, 7th Earl of Cottenham and was the mother of Charles Pepys, 8th Earl of Cottenham
- Lt. Col. John Henry Guy Nevill, 5th Marquess of Abergavenny (1914–2000)
- Lord Rupert Nevill (1923–1982)

After the death of his father-in-law, he changed his surname (for himself and his wife only) from Nevill to Larnach-Nevill by deed poll on 17 June 1919. He gained the rank of captain in the Scots Guards and gained the rank of honorary major in 1920 in the Sussex Yeomanry. He held the office of Deputy Lieutenant and also held the office of Justice of the Peace for Sussex.

Larnach-Nevill succeeded to the marquessate in 1938 on the death of his uncle, Henry Nevill, 3rd Marquess of Abergavenny, who died after a fall from his horse, with no surviving male issue. The 4th Marquess died in 1954 and was succeeded by his elder son, John.

His daughter Lady Angela Isabel married Digby Pepys, 7th Earl of Cottenham.

He died at Eridge Castle, near Tunbridge Wells, Kent.

== Arms ==
Coat of arms of Guy Larnach-Nevill, 4th Marquess of Abergavenny
| Crest Out of a ducal coronet or a bull’s head proper, charged with a rose gules. Escutcheon Gules a saltire argent, charged with a rose of the field, barbed and seeded proper. Supporters On either side a bull argent, pied sable, armed, unguled, collared and chained or, the latter terminating in a staple or. Motto Ne vile velis (Form no mean wish). Badge A rose gules, barbed and seeded proper. |

== Notes ==
Peerage of the United Kingdom
| Preceded by Henry Nevill | Marquess of Abergavenny; 1938–1954 | Succeeded by John Nevill |
