= Eridge Green =

Site of Special Scientific Interest in East Sussex

Coordinates: 51.100°N 0.218°E

- Site of Special Scientific Interest
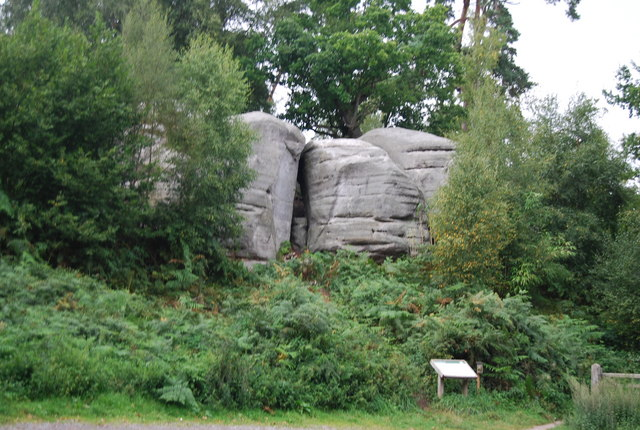
- Location of Eridge Green.
- Area of search: East Sussex
- Grid reference: TQ 554 357
- Interest: Biological
- Area: 8.4 hectares (21 acres)
- Notification date: 1985
- Location map: Magic Map

Eridge Green is a 8.4-hectare (21-acre) biological Site of Special Scientific Interest north-east of Crowborough in East Sussex. It is part of the 44 hectares (110 acres) Eridge Rocks nature reserve, which is managed by Sussex Wildlife Trust.

This is ancient woodland on clay with outcrops of sandstone which form cliffs up to ten metres high. Flora on the rocks include Tunbridge filmy fern, the mosses Dicranum scottianum and Orthodontium gracile and the liverworts Scapania umbrosa, Scapania gracilis and Harpanthus scutatus.

There is access from Warren Farm Lane.
