= Reginald Nevill, 2nd Marquess of Abergavenny =

British peer (1853–1927)

The Marquess of Abergavenny
- Marquess of Abergavenny
- Arms of the Marquess of Abergavenny
- Tenure: 12 December 1915 – 13 October 1927
- Successor: Henry Nevill, 3rd Marquess
- Other titles: 6th Earl of Abergavenny; 2nd Earl of Lewes; 6th Viscount Nevill
- Born: 4 March 1853
- Died: 13 October 1927 (aged 74)
- Parents: William Nevill, 1st Marquess of Abergavenny; Caroline Vanden-Bempdé Johnstone

Reginald William Bransby Nevill, 2nd Marquess of Abergavenny JP (4 March 1853 – 13 October 1927), styled Viscount Nevill between 1868 and 1876 and Earl of Lewes between 1876 and 1915, was a British peer.

== Early life ==
Nevill was the eldest son of William Nevill, 1st Marquess of Abergavenny, by Caroline Vanden-Bempde-Johnstone, daughter of Sir John Vanden-Bempde-Johnstone, 2nd Baronet. One of his brothers was William Beauchamp Nevill. He was educated at Eton.

== Career ==
Nevill never lived in Abergavenny. Besides the marquessate, he inherited the titles of Earl of Lewes, Viscount Nevill and Baron Bergavenny He was appointed a Justice of the Peace for Kent in 1880. He was also a "staunch Conservative" and patron of 24 livings. During his last years he was a "mentally afflicted" invalid, and "an inmate of a home in Cheshire". He died at Cheadle Royal, Cheshire, on 13 October 1927, aged 74. He was buried at Eridge Castle on 17 October. He never married and was succeeded in the marquessate by his younger brother, Lord Henry Nevill.

== Arms ==
Coat of arms of Reginald Nevill, 2nd Marquess of Abergavenny
Crest Out of a ducal coronet or a bull’s head proper, charged with a rose gules. Escutcheon Gules a saltire argent, charged with a rose of the field, barbed and seeded proper. Supporters On either side a bull argent, pied sable, armed, unguled, collared and chained or, the latter terminating in a staple or. Motto Ne vile velis (Form no mean wish). Badge A rose gules, barbed and seeded proper.

== Notes ==
Peerage of the United Kingdom
Preceded by William Nevill	Marquess of Abergavenny; 1915–1927	Succeeded by Henry Nevill
