= Henry Nevill, 3rd Marquess of Abergavenny =

British peer (1854–1938)

The Most Honourable Henry Nevill
- Marquess of Abergavenny
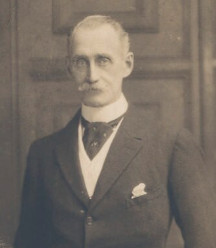
- Henry Nevill, 3rd Marquess of Abergavenny, 1931
- Tenure: 13 October 1927 – 10 January 1938
- Successor: Guy Larnach-Nevill, 4th Marquess
- Other titles: 7th Earl of Abergavenny; 3rd Earl of Lewes; 7th Viscount Nevill
- Born: 2 September 1854
- Died: 10 January 1938 (aged 83)
- Spouses: Violet Streatfeild; Maud Augusta Beckett-Denison; Mary Frances Hardinge (née Nevill)
- Issue: Joan Marion Nevill; Gilbert Reginald Nevill; Geoffrey Nevill; Marguerite Helen Nevill
- Parents: William Nevill, 1st Marquess of Abergavenny; Caroline Vanden-Bempdé Johnstone

Lieutenant-Colonel Henry Gilbert Ralph Nevill, 3rd Marquess of Abergavenny DL (2 September 1854 – 10 January 1938), styled Lord Henry Nevill between 1876 and 1927, was a British peer.

== Early life ==
Neville was born in Bramham, West Yorkshire and christened at St. Alban's Church, Frant, as the second son of William Nevill, 1st Marquess of Abergavenny, and his wife Caroline Vanden-Bempde-Johnstone, daughter of Sir John Vanden-Bempde-Johnstone, 2nd Baronet.

== Career ==
He was a lieutenant-colonel in the Territorial Army Reserves, a major in the Sussex Imperial Yeomanry and a deputy lieutenant of Sussex. In 1881 he lived in Chiddingstone, Kent and in 1891 at Thornhill, Hammerwood, East Sussex.

He succeeded to the marquessate in October 1927, aged 73, on the death of his brother, who died without issue.

== Personal life ==
Lord Abergavenny married Violet Streatfeild, daughter of Lieutenant-Colonel Henry Dorrien Streatfeild, on 12 September 1876. They had three children:

- Lady Joan Marion Nevill (1877–1952), she married John Pratt, 4th Marquess Camden.
- Gilbert Reginald Nevill (1879–1891), who died young.
- Geoffrey Nevill (b./d. 1879), who died in infancy.

After his first wife's death on 25 December 1880 he married Maud Augusta Beckett-Denison, daughter of William Beckett-Denison, on 20 October 1886. They had one child:

- Lady Marguerite Helen Nevill (1887–1975), she married Lt.-Col. Sir Albert Edward Delavel Astley, 21st Lord Hastings.

After his second wife's death on 15 July 1927 he married his first cousin, Mary Frances Nevill, daughter of the Honourable Ralph Pelham Neville and widow of Henry Hardinge, 3rd Viscount Hardinge, on 18 October 1928. This marriage produced no children.

Lord Abergavenny died after falling from a horse during a fox hunt. As he died with no male heir, the marquessate passed to his nephew, Major Guy Larnach-Nevill, on his death. The Marchioness of Abergavenny died in October 1954, aged 85.

== In popular culture ==
Lord Abergavenny appears as "Lord Dumborough" in Siegfried Sassoon's autobiographical novel Memoirs of a Fox-Hunting Man.

== Arms ==
Coat of arms of Henry Nevill, 3rd Marquess of Abergavenny
Crest Out of a ducal coronet or a bull’s head proper, charged with a rose gules. Escutcheon Gules a saltire argent, charged with a rose of the field, barbed and seeded proper. Supporters On either side a bull argent, pied sable, armed, unguled, collared and chained or, the latter terminating in a staple or. Motto Ne vile velis (Form no mean wish). Badge A rose gules, barbed and seeded proper.

== Notes ==
Peerage of the United Kingdom
Preceded by Reginald Nevill	Marquess of Abergavenny; 1927–1938	Succeeded by Guy Larnach-Nevill
