= Scheduled monuments in Leicester =

Protected historic sites in Leicester, England

Scheduled Monuments in Leicester

There are ten scheduled monuments in Leicester. These range from the Roman Jewry Wall and Raw Dykes to the medieval Leicester Castle and the early modern King William's Bridge. Several of the scheduled sites have a wide area protecting more than one feature. Seven of the fourteen Grade I listed buildings in Leicester are within the three most central scheduled areas.

In the United Kingdom, a scheduled monument is a "nationally important" archaeological site or historic building that has been given protection against unauthorised change. Scheduled monuments are defined in the Ancient Monuments and Archaeological Areas Act 1979 and the National Heritage Act 1983. They are also referred to as scheduled ancient monuments. There are about 18,300 scheduled monument entries on the list, which is maintained by English Heritage; more than one site can be included in a single entry. While a scheduled monument can also be recognised as a listed building, English Heritage considers listed building status as a better way of protecting buildings than scheduled monument status. If a monument is considered by English Heritage to "no longer merit scheduling" it can be descheduled.

== List of monuments ==
| Name | Location | Comments | Date (Note: All dates are derived from the Leicester City Council website. Many of the monuments incorporate features from a variety of periods.) | Grid reference | SM & HE numbers | References | Image |
|---|---|---|---|---|---|---|---|
| Aylestone Medieval Packhorse Bridge | Aylestone | Now 50m long, originally perhaps 200m. Also known as The 'Roman' bridge, Aylestone | 15th century? | SK567009; 52.603°N 1.1634°W | SM00010; 1003132 | | |
| Beaumont Leys Medieval Earthworks | Castle Hill, Astill Lodge Road | Includes remains of preceptory, mounds, fishpond and dam | Medieval | SK565092; 52.6776°N 1.1658°W | SM17095; 1009196 | | Castle Hill area from Astill Lodge Road, Leicester |
| Belgrave Bridge | Thurcaston Road, Belgrave | Six-arched bridge over the River Soar. Originally seven arches, but one was combined to give headroom for boats. Still used for traffic, but now limited to buses and bicycles only. A concrete footbridge on the south side, and a large sewage pipe on the north, mar its visual appearance. | 15th century? | SK59050736; 52.6607°N 1.1284°W | SM00031; 1299667 | | Medieval road bridge over the river Soar at Thurcaston Road, Belgrave |
| Birds Nest Site | Battersbee Road | Lodge surrounded by a moat, now barely visible, and used as a recreation pitch. | 14th century | SK552059; 52.648035°N 1.1855458°W | SM17027; 1010664 | | Birds Nest Lodge, New Parks, south east corner of the 14th century moated site |
| The Hollow | Evington | Moated medieval manorial complex with fishponds | Medieval | SK626027; 52.61847°N 1.0767894°W | SM17026; 1010686 | | |
| Jewry Wall and nearby remains | St Nicholas Circle | Roman remains, some of which are incorporated into St Nicholas' Church, Leicester | Roman, Anglo-Saxon | SK582044; 52.634239°N 1.1414732°W | SM17154; 1013312 | | |
| King William's Bridge | Sheepwash Lane, Anstey, Leicestershire | Two-arch packhorse bridge | 17th century? | SK556089; 52.67496°N 1.1791293°W | SM00195; 1003568 | | |
| Leicester Abbey | Abbey Park | Includes the Abbey Ruins, Abbot Penny's Wall, Cavendish House and Ornamental Gardens | From 12th century | SK583058; 52.646812°N 1.139749°W | SM17131; 1012149 | | |
| Leicester Castle and the Magazine Gateway | Castle Yard, Castle Park, The Newarke | Includes the Castle Mound, Turret Gateway, Great Hall, 'Dungeon'/John of Gaunt's cellar, and the Magazine Gateway | Medieval | SK582041; 52.631542°N 1.141526°W | SM17127; 1012147 | | |
| Raw Dykes | Aylestone Road | Purpose uncertain: possibly Roman Aqueduct | Roman | SK583026; 52.618049°N 1.1403129°W | SM30218; 1017391 | | |

== See also ==
- Grade I listed buildings in Leicester
