= Abbey Park, Leicester =

Public park in Leicester, England

Abbey Park
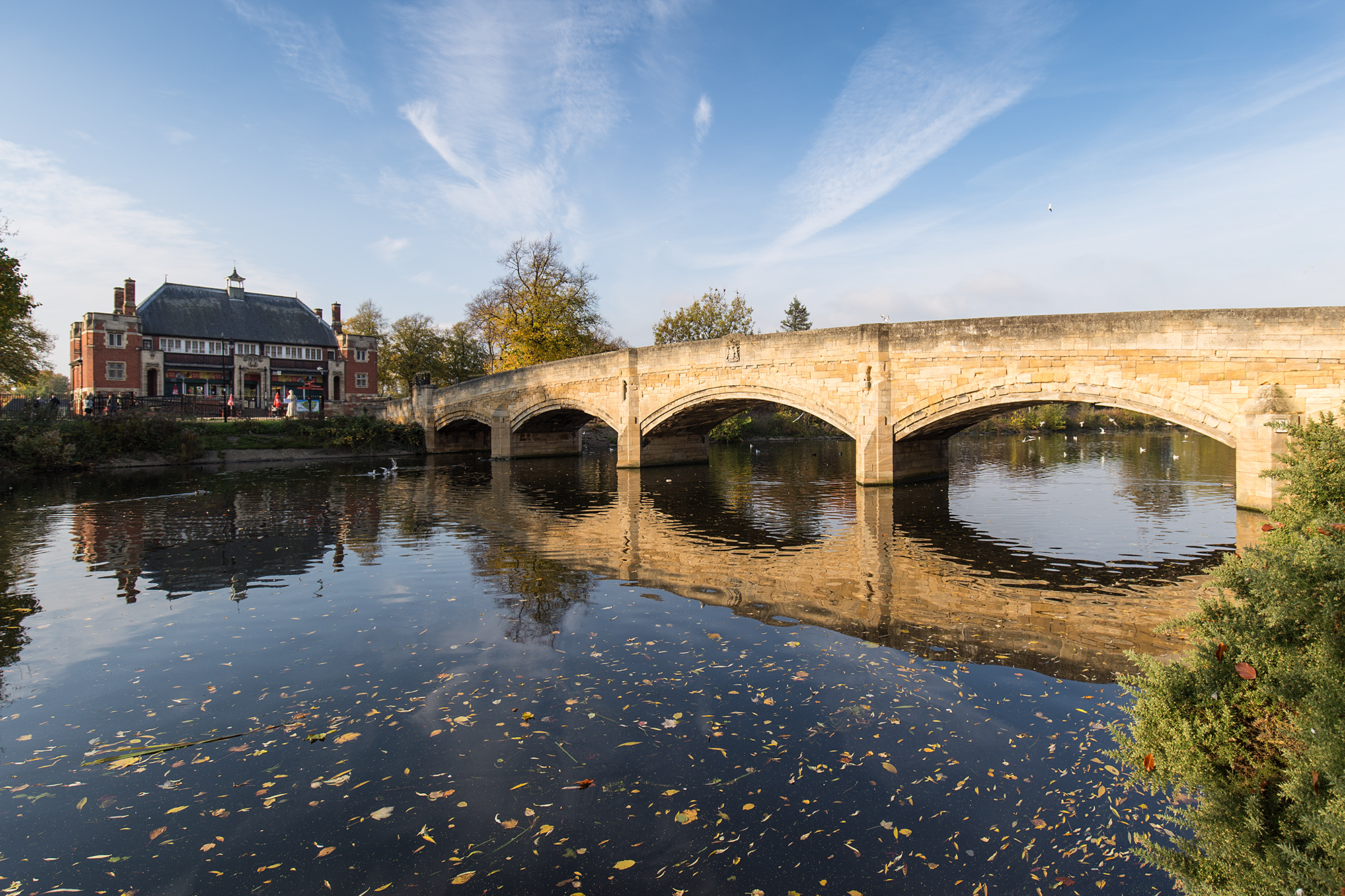
- Bridge over River Soar, Abbey Park
- Interactive map of Abbey Park
- Location: Leicester, UK
- Coordinates: 52.647°N 1.136°W
- Area: 89 acres (36 ha)
- Opened: 29 May 1882; 144 years ago
- Operator: Leicester City Council
- Open: Open all year
- Status: Grade II* (Register of Historic Parks and Gardens
- Water: River Soar & boating lake
- Designation: Green Flag
- Website: leicester.gov.uk

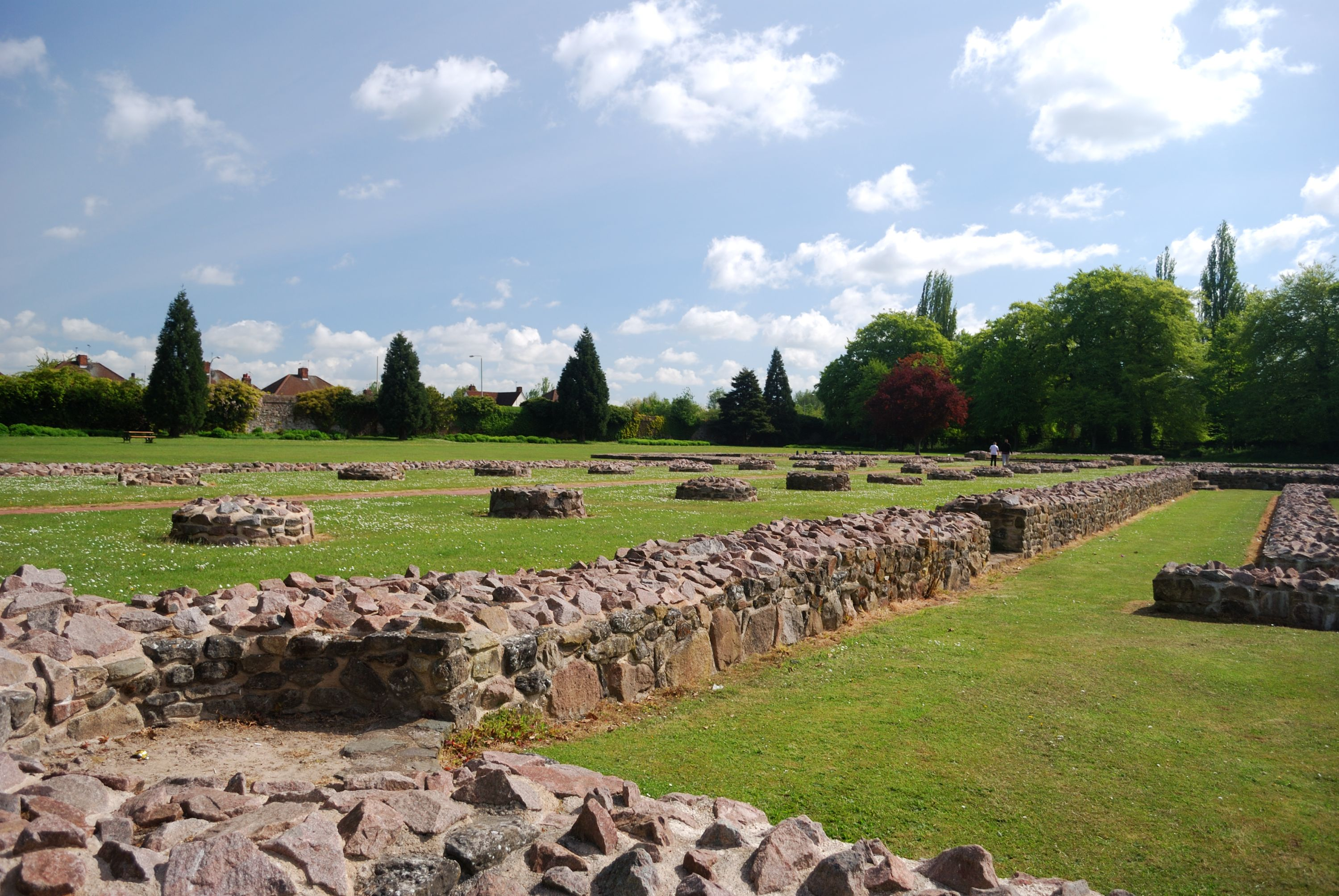
Abbey site

Abbey Park is a public park in Leicester, England, through which the River Soar flows. It is owned and managed by Leicester City Council and is Leicester's premier park. It opened in 1882 on the flood plain of the River Soar, and expanded in 1932 to include the area west of the river that had formerly been the medieval St Mary's Abbey, still bounded by large medieval walls. The park includes the archaeological sites of the Abbey and the ruins of Cavendish House, along with a wide range of decorative and recreational parkland features. It is Grade II* listed in Historic England's Register of Parks and Gardens.

== History ==
In 1876 Leicester town council bought 57 acres (23 ha) of marshy ground between the river and canal from the Earl of Dysart in order to develop flood prevention plans. Planning for this first incarnation of the park was underway by 1879, as part of designs by the borough surveyors for the relief of flooding in the area. However the design for the park itself was opened up to a competition. The winning design, with its bandstand, rustic bridges and planted gardens, was the work of William Barron, a celebrated landscape designer. It was Leicester's first public park of significant size, and was opened on 29 May 1882 by the Prince and Princess of Wales, an event commemorated by an ornate plaque at the Abbey Park Road entrance. The park was created in an area that had previously been described as "marshy ground in a poor district" at a cost of over £40,000. The works included the widening and deepening of the river over a length of around a mile, with the excavated earth used to create mounds within the park, as well as the construction of stone weirs and locks. Three new bridges were constructed crossing the river. An artificial lake was created and over 33,000 trees planted. Excavations as part of the work discovered remains of animals including elephants and rhinoceros. The resulting park occupied 57 acres of land between the River Soar and the Grand Union Canal. Two lodges designed by architect Mr. J. Tait were built at the Abbey Road entrance to the park.

Although the new park was called Abbey Park, the site of the abbey itself, bounded by substantial medieval masonry and brick walls, was not within the park, but was in agricultural land on the other side of the River Soar. The exact location of the Abbey was unknown, with no standing remains other than the boundary walls and the ruins of the sixteenth century Cavendish House. Archaeological investigations of a limited nature began in the 1920s, and popular enthusiasm was fuelled by the 1922 discoveries in Egypt of Tutankhamun's tomb, and a hope that Cardinal Wolsey's tomb might be similarly discovered. After assorted modest excavations, the 32 acre Abbey Grounds site was donated to the city by the Earl of Dysart at the end of 1925. Several years of preliminary works, and sporadic attempts to pin down the site of the Abbey buildings, were followed by more thorough work undertaken in 1929–30. With the rise in unemployment culminating in the Great Depression the city council attempted to alleviate local poverty by employing a team of workmen to clear pernicious weeds from the overgrown site, and the architect W K Bedingfield was able to utilise this process to also search for, and then uncover the buried foundations of the Abbey buildings. A variety of graves were found, but no magnificent tomb of the sort popularly hoped for. Having exposed and mapped the extent of the Abbey Church and a variety of monastic buildings, the workforce built low walls to mark out the foundations and pier bases. They also carried out extensive repairs to the stonework and brickwork of the medieval boundary walls particularly along the north and western sides of the site, traditionally ascribed to Abbot Penny and Abbot Cloune. The north and western wall is now named Abbot Penny's Wall, and is a Grade I listed structure. Paths were laid out across the grounds, tennis courts were built, a large oval was levelled for use as a cricket pitch, and a new stone bridge in a classical style, was built across the River Soar to link the two parts of the park.

Despite the absence of a tomb, the abbey ruins received a memorial slab to Cardinal Thomas Wolsey. He died while en route from York to London on 29 November 1530. A statue of him also stands next to the Park's cafe. Alongside the site of the 12th century Leicester Abbey, which was marked out with low stone walls, are the substantial ruins of Cavendish House (built in the 17th century by William Cavendish, 1st Earl of Devonshire incorporating the Abbey Gatehouse, and by tradition built using stone from the abbey). The house was used by Charles I after the siege of Leicester during the English Civil War in 1645; after he left, his soldiers set fire to it leaving the house gutted. The charred stone window frame is still visible today.

== Facilities ==
The park now has an area of 89 acres (36 ha), and has formal gardens, a sensory garden, a boating lake and model boat lake, a miniature railway operated by Leicester Society of Model Engineers since 1949, a visitor centre, cafe, children's play area with paddling pool, pets corner, tennis courts, a bowling green, and a bandstand. The park has regularly won the Green Flag Award, a national award made annually to parks which reach a high standard. Takeover Radio 103.2FM were previously based within one of the gatehouse lodges from 2010 until their cessation in 2023.

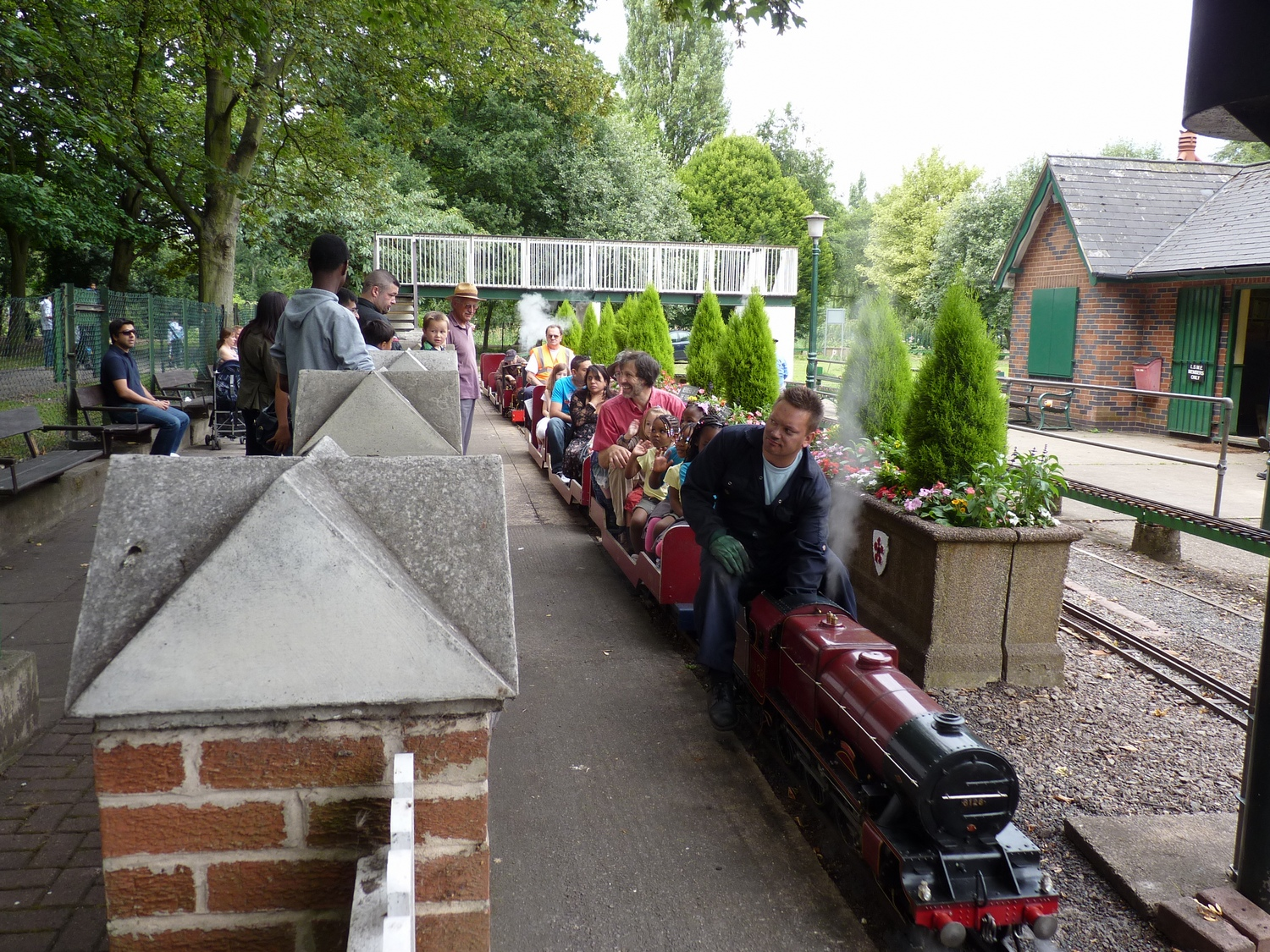
Abbey Park Miniature railway

== Events ==
=== Current Events ===
An annual bonfire and fireworks event is held in the park around Guy Fawkes Night.

Leicester Pride is now held around the last week of August/start of September, relocating from Victoria Park in 2023, the 2026 event is due to be held on Saturday 5th September.

=== Past Events ===
The park was the site of an annual flower show dating back to the 19th century, which included a swimming gala and evolved into the Abbey Park Show in the 1940s, with the addition a range of entertainment and displays. It continued until 1995, when it was abolished due to falling attendances and rising costs, although a return is periodically discussed. It was also the site of the Pageant of Leicester, held in 1932. The Abbey Park Festival was an annual music festival which was held for over twenty years from 1981.

== Other Uses ==
The Abbey has been the site of training excavations by Archaeology students at Leicester University.

== See also ==
- Scheduled monuments in Leicester
- Grade I listed buildings in Leicester
