= 1884–85 Leicester Fosse F.C. season =

1st season in existence of Leicester Fosse/Leicester City

Leicester Fosse
1884–85 season
Home colours

The 1884–85 season was the first season in which Leicester Fosse competed in a senior football competition. However, they would not play competitive football until 1887 and did not join the Football League until 1892, so only friendly matches were played.

== Results ==
=== Friendly Matches ===
- Note: A cumulative record shows 2 untraced games of 1884-85 finishing in a 0-0 draw and a 0-2 defeat. With games at Victoria Park, it is impossible to know whether Leicester is considered the "Home" or "Away" team as several other local teams, including several in these fixtures, played at the same venue.
- Leicester City scores given first

Date	Opponents	Venue	Result
1 November 1884	Syston Fosse	Fosse Road	5–0
8 November 1884	Wyggestone Boys School	Victoria Park	1–1
15 November 1884	Mill Hill House	Victoria Park	1–2
22 November 1884	Syston St. Peters^{[A]}	Away	2–1
29 November 1884	Mill Hill House	Victoria Park	0–0
3 January 1885	Melbourne Hall	Victoria Park	2–0
10 January 1885	Syston Fosse^{[B]}	Victoria Park	1–0
31 January 1885	Mill Hill House	Victoria Park	1–1
7 February 1885	Syston St. Peters^{[A]}	Victoria Park	2–0
7 March 1885	Wyggeston Boys School	Victoria Park	0–1
14 March 1885	Mill Hill House	Victoria Park	2–0
21 March 1885	St. Mary's	Victoria Park	1–0

== Notes ==
A. ^{a} ^{b} 12 a-side match.

B. ^{B} Match abandoned due to rain.
