= Grade I listed buildings in Leicester =

Grade I listed buildings in Leicester

There are fourteen Grade I listed buildings in Leicester. In the United Kingdom, the term listed building refers to a building or other structure officially designated as being of special architectural, historical or cultural significance. Grade I structures are those considered to be "buildings of exceptional interest". Listing was begun by a provision in the Town and Country Planning Act 1947. Once listed, severe restrictions are imposed on the modifications allowed to a building's structure or its fittings. In England, the authority for listing under the Planning (Listed Buildings and Conservation Areas) Act 1990 rests with Historic England, a non-departmental public body sponsored by the Department for Culture, Media and Sport. Local authorities have a responsibility to regulate and enforce the planning regulations.

There are also ten Scheduled Monuments in Leicester, some of which are also listed buildings.

== List of Grade I buildings ==
Name	Location	Type	Completed (Note: The date given is the date used by Historic England as significant for the initial building or that of an important part in the structure's description.)	Date designated	Grid ref. (Note: Sometimes known as OSGB36, the grid reference is based on the British national grid reference system used by the Ordnance Survey.) Geo-coordinates	Notes	Entry number (Note: The "List Entry Number" is a unique number assigned to each listed building and scheduled monument by Historic England.)	Image	Ref.
Leicester Abbey Ruins	1 Abbey Park	Ruin	Founded 1143	1950	SK5846806007; 52°38′55″N 1°08′14″W	Within a public park. Includes a memorial slab to Cardinal Wolsey.	1074051	Leicester Abbey Ruins More images	
Abbot Penny's Wall	2 Abbey Park	Wall	c.1500	1975	SK5851306115; 52°38′59″N 1°08′12″W	Forms West and north boundary to Abbey Lane and Abbey Park Road East boundary along River Soar. Some of the earliest medieval brickwork in Leicester.	1361406	Abbot Penny's Wall More images	
Remains of Cavendish House	3 Abbey Park	Ruin	c.1600	1950	SK5840806078; 52°38′57″N 1°08′17″W	Built from stones of Leicester Abbey. Now within the public park.	1074052	Remains of Cavendish House More images	
Castle Hall	4 Castle Yard	Castle hall	11th–12th century, front 1695	1975	SK5822204190; 52°37′56″N 1°08′28″W	Includes the Great Hall of Leicester Castle, with its hammer beam roof and Queen Anne frontage, and John of Gaunt's cellar	1200622	Castle Hall	
Turret Gateway	5 Castle View	Fortification	c.1422-3	1950	SK5831204122; 52°37′54″N 1°08′24″W	It gave access from Castle Yard to 'The Newarke'. It is also known as Prince Rupert's Gateway, from his Civil War action, capturing the town.	1074069	Turret Gateway More images	
Church of St Mary de Castro	6 Castle Yard	Church	From early 13th century	1950	SK5828504188; 52°37′56″N 1°08′25″W	Spire dismantled in 2013, with hopes of funding to re-instate it.	1074070	Church of St Mary de Castro More images	
Former Church of All Saints	7 High Cross Street	Church	From early 13th century	1950	SK5827404840; 52°38′18″N 1°08′25″W	In the care of the Churches Conservation Trust	1074012	Former Church of All Saints More images	
The Guildhall	8 Guildhall Lane	Guildhall	From mid-14th century	1950	SK5844404453; 52°38′05″N 1°08′16″W	Served as de facto Town Hall until 1874. Includes the Constable's House.	1361405	The Guildhall More images	
The City Rooms	9 Hotel Street	Assembly Rooms	1792	1950	SK5869904350; 52°38′01″N 1°08′03″W	Architect: John Johnson of Leicester. Name changed from 'County Rooms' when City Council acquired it.	1184114	The City Rooms More images	
Church of St Margaret	10; St Margaret's Way	Church	Mainly 15th century	1950	SK5854205087; 52°38′25″N 1°08′11″W	Transept dates to 1200. Evidence of Anglo-Saxon origins. It now stands on St Margaret's Way (A6), which was built in 1960s, but originally listed as being on Church Gate.)	1074072	Church of St Margaret More images	
Jewry Wall	11; St Nicholas Circle	Roman masonry	AD 125-30	1950	SK5822404489; 52°38′06″N 1°08′28″W	Among the largest surviving non-military Roman masonry in Britain. Stands alongside excavated remains of Roman Forum.	1074773	Jewry Wall More images	
Church of St Nicholas	12; St Nicholas Circle	Church	From AD 880	1950	SK5823804501; 52°38′07″N 1°08′27″W	Incorporates re-used Roman brickwork	1361046	Church of St Nicholas More images	
Magazine Gateway	13; The Newarke	fortification	c.1410	1950	SK5844604120; 52°37′54″N 1°08′16″W	Principal gateway to Henry, 3rd Earl of Lancaster's Newarke founded in 1310.	1184902	Magazine Gateway More images	
The Arch of Remembrance	14; Victoria Park, Leicester	War memorial	1923	1955	SK5956503212; 52°37′24″N 1°07′17″W	Architect: Sir Edwin Lutyens	1074786	The Arch of Remembrance More images	

== See also ==
- Scheduled Monuments in Leicester
