= Anne Neville (disambiguation) =

Anne Neville (1456–1485) was an English queen, the daughter of Richard Neville, 16th Earl of Warwick.

Anne Neville may also refer to:

- Anne Beauchamp, 16th Countess of Warwick (1426–1492), mother of Anne Neville
- Anne Neville, Duchess of Buckingham (c. 1408–1480), daughter of Ralph Neville, 1st Earl of Westmorland
- Anne Neville (abbess) (1605–1689), English Roman Catholic nun and royal debt collector
- Anne Neville (engineer) (1970–2022), professor at the University of Leeds
