= Edward Nevill, 8th Baron Bergavenny =

English peer

Edward Neville
- Baron Bergavenny
- Born: 1550
- Died: 1 December 1622 (aged 71–72)
- Noble family: House of Neville
- Spouse: Rachel Lennard
- Issue: Henry Nevill, 9th Baron Bergavenny; Mary Nevill; Sir Christopher Nevill; Edward Nevill; John Nevill; Thomas Nevill; Charles Nevill; Elizabeth Nevill; Catherine Nevill; Frances Nevill; Margaret Nevill
- Father: Edward Nevill, 7th Baron Bergavenny
- Mother: Katharine Brome

Edward Nevill, de facto 8th (de jure 1st) Baron Bergavenny (c. 1550 – 1 December 1622) was an English peer.

The son of Edward Nevill, 7th Baron Bergavenny, he succeeded to the Barony upon the death of his father. His right to the title was contested by his cousin Mary, Lady Fane, who claimed to be heir general of her father, the 6th Baron. The dispute went on for many years.

He married Rachel Lennard, daughter of John Lennard of Knoll and Elizabeth Harman, together they had the following children:

- Henry Nevill, 9th Baron Bergavenny (b. bef. 1580 – 24 December 1641)
- Mary Nevill (b. bef. 1598 – 1648) married George Goring, 1st Earl of Norwich
- Sir Christopher Nevill (b. bef. 1611 – 1649) married Mary D'Arcy, daughter and co-heiress of Thomas D'Arcy, and had Richard Nevill (d. abt. 1643), who married Sophia Carew. Their son, George Nevill (d. 1665), and his wife, Mary Whitelock, were the parents of George Nevill, 13th Baron Bergavenny and Capt. Edward Nevill (d. 1701). Edward Nevill married Hannah Thorp and had William Nevill, 16th Baron Bergavenny. Sir Christopher Nevill and Mary D'Arcy also had, second son, William Nevill, General of the Pretender, who was forced to emigrate for James Francis Edward Stuart having been defeated in 1715. He came to Portugal and established himself at the city of Porto, founding the Farm of the Tojo, at Canidelo, Parish of Santo André, Municipality of Vila Nova de Gaia. This one married Mary Joanna then Maria Joana Tyson (Dublin, 25 December 1681 - Vila Nova de Gaia, Santa Marinha, House of the Fojo, 1743), sister of Admiral Richard then Ricardo Tyson and daughter of John Baptist then João Baptista Tyson (Antwerp, 22 February 1638 - Porto, São Nicolau, 1700?) and wife Cornelia then Cornélia de Bus (Schravenhagen, 19 February 1642 - Porto, c. 1689), and they were parents of William then Guilherme Nevill, 2nd Lord of the Farm and House of the Fojo, who enlarged the farm and continued the house, receiving himself with Mary Jane then Maria Joana Tousand, from Ireland, of whom he had issue which continued the surname. Their daughter or otherwise patrilineal descendant was the mother of the 1st Baron of Saavedra. For being abundantly known this family, General William Carr Beresford, when he came organizing the Loyal Lusitanian Legion and commanding the Portuguese forces, lodged with other Generals at the House of the Fojo and at one of the Cais Novo, in the city of Porto, for they brought letters of recommendation to William or Guilherme Nevill. The arms this family uses, as much in England as in Portugal, are: gules, a saltire argent charged of a rose buttoned or, with points vert; crest: a bull's head, spotted argent and sable, armed or.
- Edward Nevill (b. bef. 1616)
- John Nevill (b. bef. 1616)
- Thomas Nevill (b. bef. 1616)
- Charles Nevill (b. bef. 1616)
- Elizabeth Nevill (b. bef. 1590, died after 1648), who married firstly Sir John Grey, eldest son of Henry Grey, 1st Baron Grey of Groby and secondly Sir John Bingley MP (died 1638), Comptroller of the Musters and Cheques for Ireland
- Catherine Nevill (b. bef. 1616)
- Frances Nevill (b. bef. 1616)
- Margaret Nevill (b. bef. 1616)

Parliament of England
Preceded by Henry Neville; Edward Hake	Member of Parliament for Windsor; 1588–1589; With: Edward Hake	Succeeded by Henry Neville; Edward Neville
Peerage of England
Preceded by Edward Nevill	Baron Bergavenny; 1589–1622	Succeeded by Henry Nevill
