= Arch of Remembrance =

War memorial in Leicester, England

The Arch of Remembrance
- United Kingdom
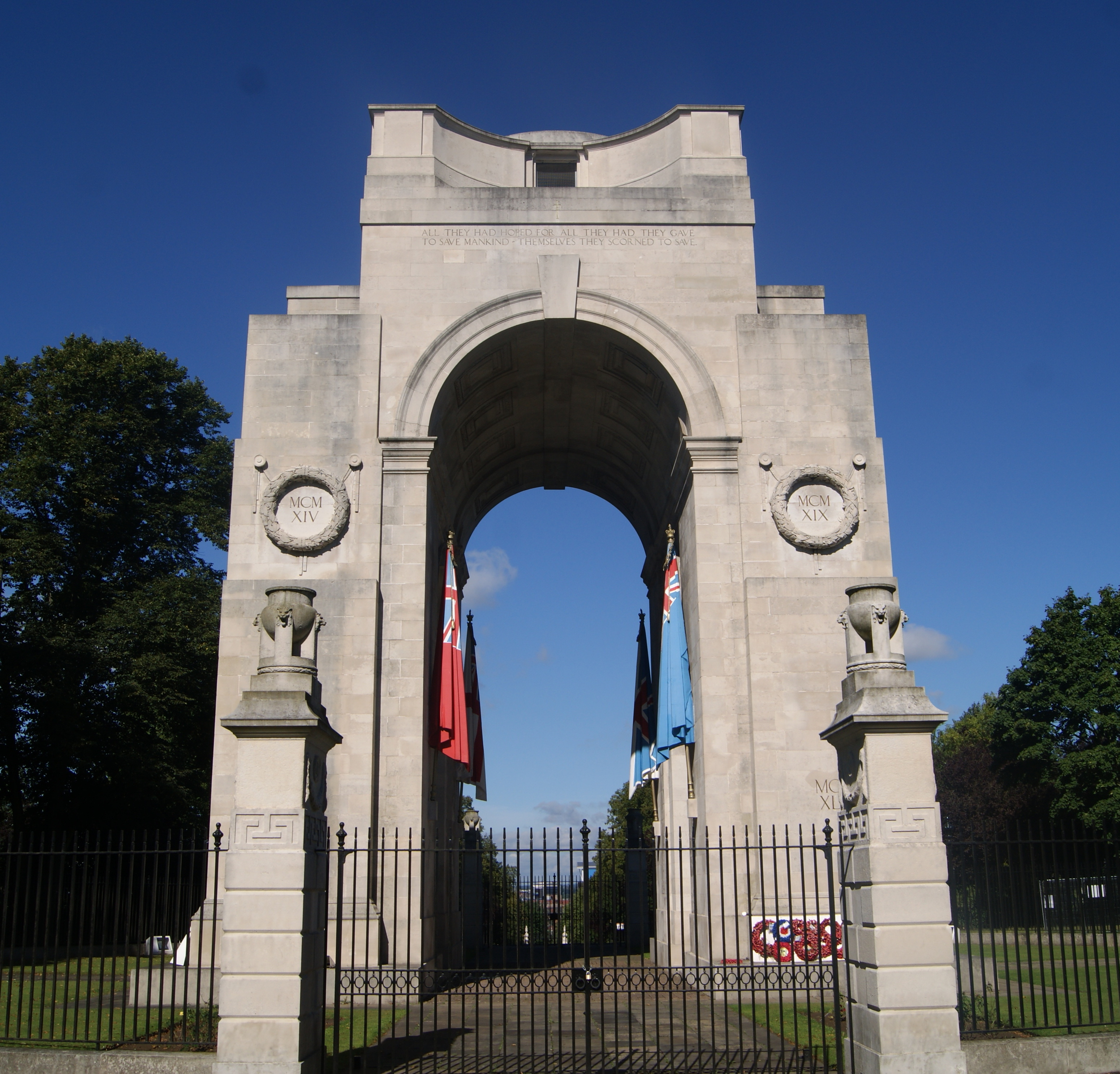
- For servicemen from Leicester killed in the First World War
- Unveiled: 4 July 1925
- Location: 52.6234°N 1.1215°W; Victoria Park, Leicester, England
- Designed by: Sir Edwin Lutyens

Listed Building – Grade I
- Official name: The Arch of Remembrance
- Designated: 23 February 1955
- Reference no.: 1074786

The Arch of Remembrance is a First World War memorial designed by Sir Edwin Lutyens and located in Victoria Park, Leicester, in the East Midlands of England. Leicester's industry contributed significantly to the British war effort. A temporary war memorial was erected in 1917, and a committee was formed in 1919 to propose a permanent memorial. The committee resolved to appoint Lutyens as architect and to site the memorial in Victoria Park. Lutyens's first proposal was accepted by the committee but was scaled back and eventually cancelled due to a shortage of funds. The committee then asked Lutyens to design a memorial arch, which he presented to a public meeting in 1923.

The memorial is a single Portland stone arch with four legs (a tetrapylon or quadrifrons), 69 feet 4 1/4 inches (21 metres) tall. The legs form four arched openings, two large on the main axis, 36 feet (11 metres) tall, oriented north-west to south-east, and two small on the sides, 24 feet (7.3 metres) tall. At the top of the structure is a large dome, set back from the edge. The main arches are aligned so the sun shines through them at sunrise on 11 November (Armistice Day). The inside of the arch has a decorative coffered ceiling and the legs support painted stone flags which represent each of the British armed forces and the Merchant Navy. The arch is surrounded by decorative iron railings, and complemented by the later addition of a set of gates at the University Road entrance to the park and a pair of gates and lodges at the London Road entrance—the war memorial is at the intersection of the paths leading from the two entrances.

With a large budget devoted entirely to the structure, the result is one of Lutyens's largest and most imposing war memorials. It dominates Victoria Park and the surrounding area, and can be seen from the main southward routes out of the city (though building work in the intervening years has reduced the area from which it is visible). The memorial was unveiled on 4 July 1925 by two local widows in front of a large crowd, including Lutyens. It cost £27,000, though the committee was left with a funding shortfall of £5,500 which several members of the committee made up from their own pockets; the committee was sharply criticised in the local press for their handling of the campaign. The arch is a Grade I listed building and since 2015, has been part of a national collection of Lutyens's war memorials.

== Background ==
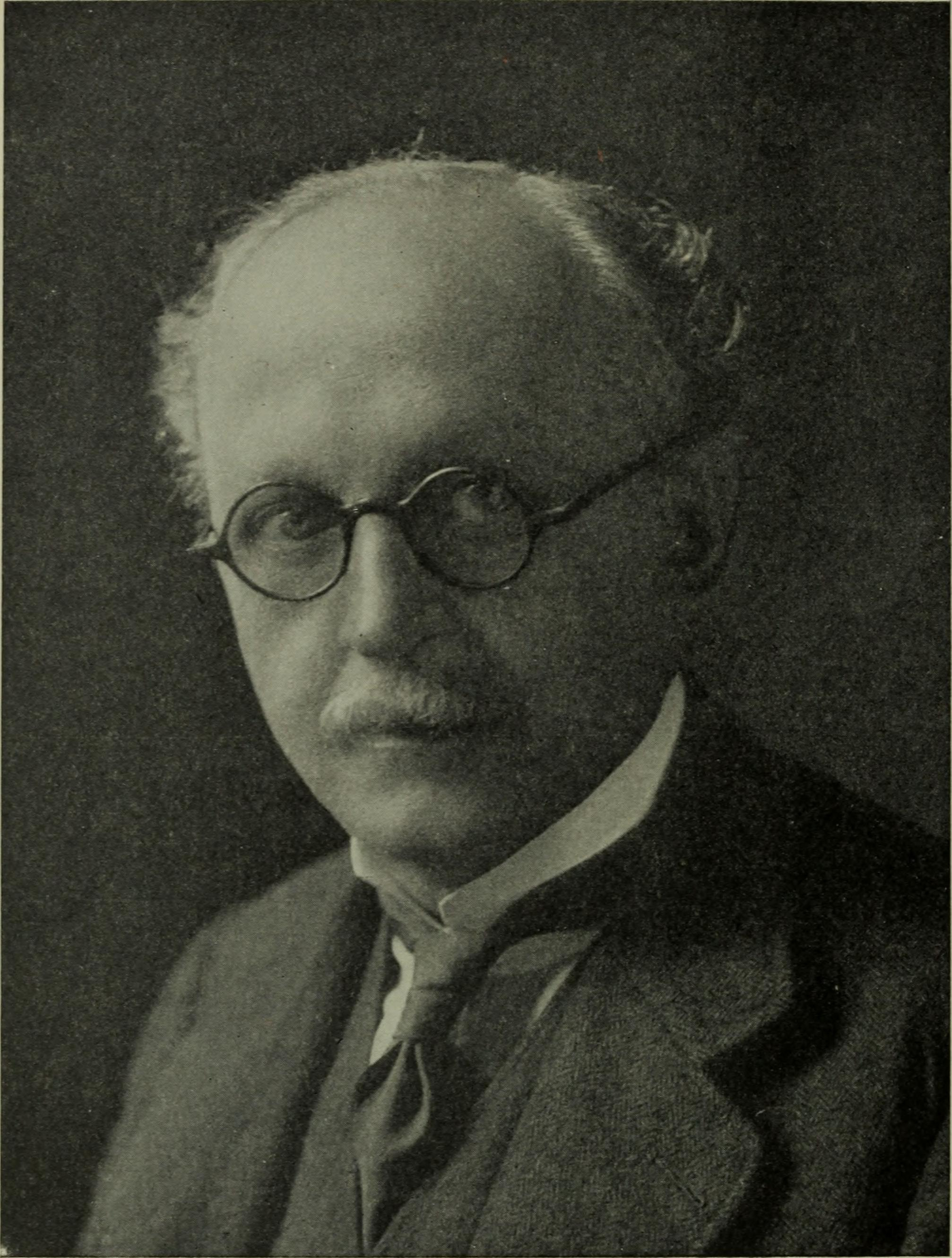
Sir Edwin Lutyens, the architect engaged for Leicester's war memorial

In the aftermath of the First World War and its unprecedented casualties, thousands of war memorials were built across Britain. Amongst the most prominent designers of memorials was Sir Edwin Lutyens, described by Historic England as "the leading English architect of his generation". Lutyens established his reputation designing country houses for wealthy clients, but the war had a profound effect on him; following it, he devoted much of his time to memorialising its casualties. He became renowned for his commemorative works through his design for The Cenotaph in London, which became Britain's national war memorial. This, along with his work for the Imperial War Graves Commission (IWGC), led to commissions for war memorials across Britain and the Empire.

Victoria Park is a 35-hectare (86-acre) area of open land to the south-east of Leicester city centre. Formerly a racetrack, it was laid out as a public park in the late 19th century. At the beginning of the First World War, five part-time Territorial Force units were based in Leicester, along with elements of the regular Leicestershire Regiment. The special reserve battalion of the Leicestershire Regiment was sent to man coastal defences near Hull, while all five territorial units were sent to the front. Among them was the city's former Member of Parliament (MP), Eliot Crawshay-Williams, who served in the Middle East with the 1st Leicestershire Royal Horse Artillery. Recruitment to the army was lower in Leicester than in other English industrial towns, partly because of low unemployment in the area—the town's major industries were textile and footwear manufacturing, both of which were necessary for the war effort. Later in the war, many of the town's factories were given over to munitions production; Leicester produced the first batch of howitzer shells by a British company which was not making ammunition before the war. The local authorities held recruiting rallies as the war progressed, aided by William Buckingham, a local soldier who won the Victoria Cross at the Battle of Neuve Chapelle in 1915.

Leicester was granted city status by King George V in 1919, in recognition of its industries' contribution to the British war effort. The king and Queen Mary visited Leicester that summer, during which they called at several businesses in the city. In De Montfort Hall, the king presented gallantry medals to several servicemen who had yet to receive them, and the lord mayor was knighted, after which the king was honoured with a march past by local soldiers, and demobilised veterans in the adjacent Victoria Park. As well as members of the public, the parade was viewed by thousands of disabled veterans, Voluntary Aid Detachment nurses, and war widows and orphans. Such was the size of the force on parade, it took 45 minutes to proceed past the royal pavilion.

== Commissioning ==
Map showing the layout of Victoria Park and the surrounding area, including London Road and University Road; the locations of the war memorial and related structures are marked.

A temporary war memorial was placed outside Leicester Town Hall in 1917. A public meeting was held on 14 May 1919 (the fighting having ceased with the armistice of 11 November 1918), which led to the creation of a War Memorial Committee of 23 members to propose a suitable permanent memorial. The committee was chaired by Henry Manners, 8th Duke of Rutland, with Sir Jonathan North (the lord mayor of Leicester) as vice-chair. Two sub-committees were established, one to look after finance and the other to supervise the design. The Duke of Rutland suggested siting the permanent memorial outside the town hall but this was rejected unanimously by the city council and the committee examined potential sites at Leicester Castle and Victoria Park.

A suggestion from a member of the public was examined by the design sub-committee, but in October 1919 the full committee resolved to appoint Lutyens as architect and to build the memorial in Victoria Park, which had been in the ownership of the city council since the 1860s and was laid out as a public park in 1883. Lutyens visited on 20 October 1919 and was accompanied by the duke and other committee members on an inspection of the chosen site. The original plan involved crossing avenues of lime trees to create a tree cathedral, with a cenotaph (identical to the one in London) at the western end, and a Stone of Remembrance at the crossing, within a circular walled enclosure, which would be inscribed with the names of the dead. The paths along the plan of the cathedral would be paved to accentuate the purpose of the structure. This proposal was accepted, and a model was made and displayed in the city museum. By March 1922, the project had been scaled back due to a shortage of funds and lack of public enthusiasm for the project—the costs were estimated at £23,000, of which only around £4,300 had been raised. At a public meeting on 29 March, the committee agreed to abandon the scheme and that "a memorial worthy of the city be erected on the ground near the main entrance gates".

Two days later, the committee asked Lutyens to design a memorial arch. Lutyens advised that such an arch would cost in the region of £25,000; he suggested they consider alternatives, such as an obelisk (which he estimated would be around half the cost) but the committee decided to proceed with the arch despite the cost. They presented the new design to another public meeting in May 1923. Lutyens told the meeting that the arch represented the city's triumphal spirit, and he announced the name "Arch of Remembrance". The name was chosen to avoid the impression that the memorial would be a triumphal arch, something the committee felt was incompatible with the mood of mourning for the dead.

The new proposal was approved, and construction started on the revised memorial in 1923, and work was completed by 1925. The structure was begun by Nine Elms Stone and Masonry Works, and completed by Holloway Brothers (who built several other memorials for Lutyens, including Southampton Cenotaph). Due to a continuing shortfall of funding, the War Memorial Committee took out a bank loan to pay for the works to be completed. Five committee members served as guarantors.

== Design ==
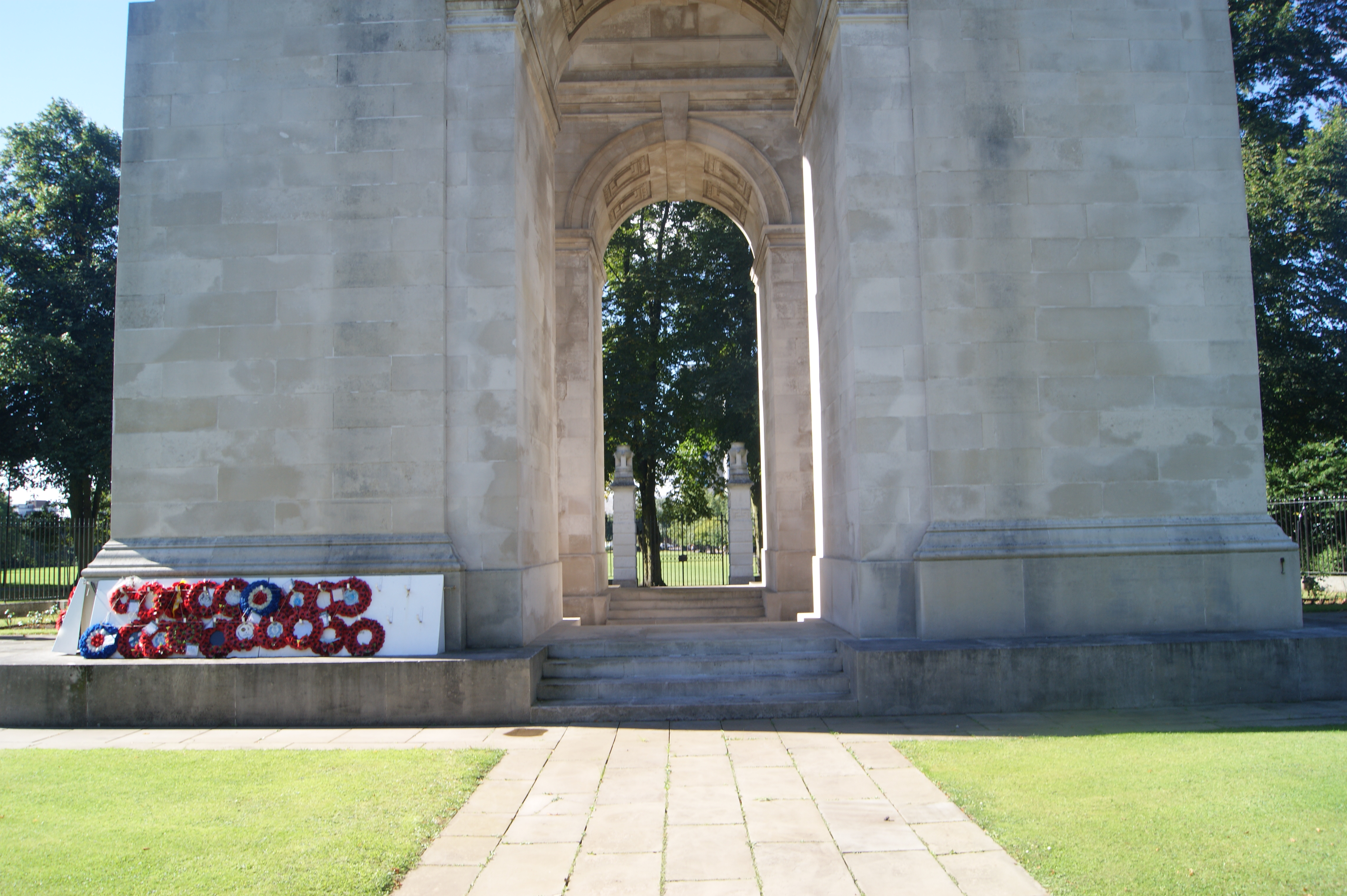
View through the smaller arches showing the cross section of the arches; the surrounding railings and pillars are visible through the arches.

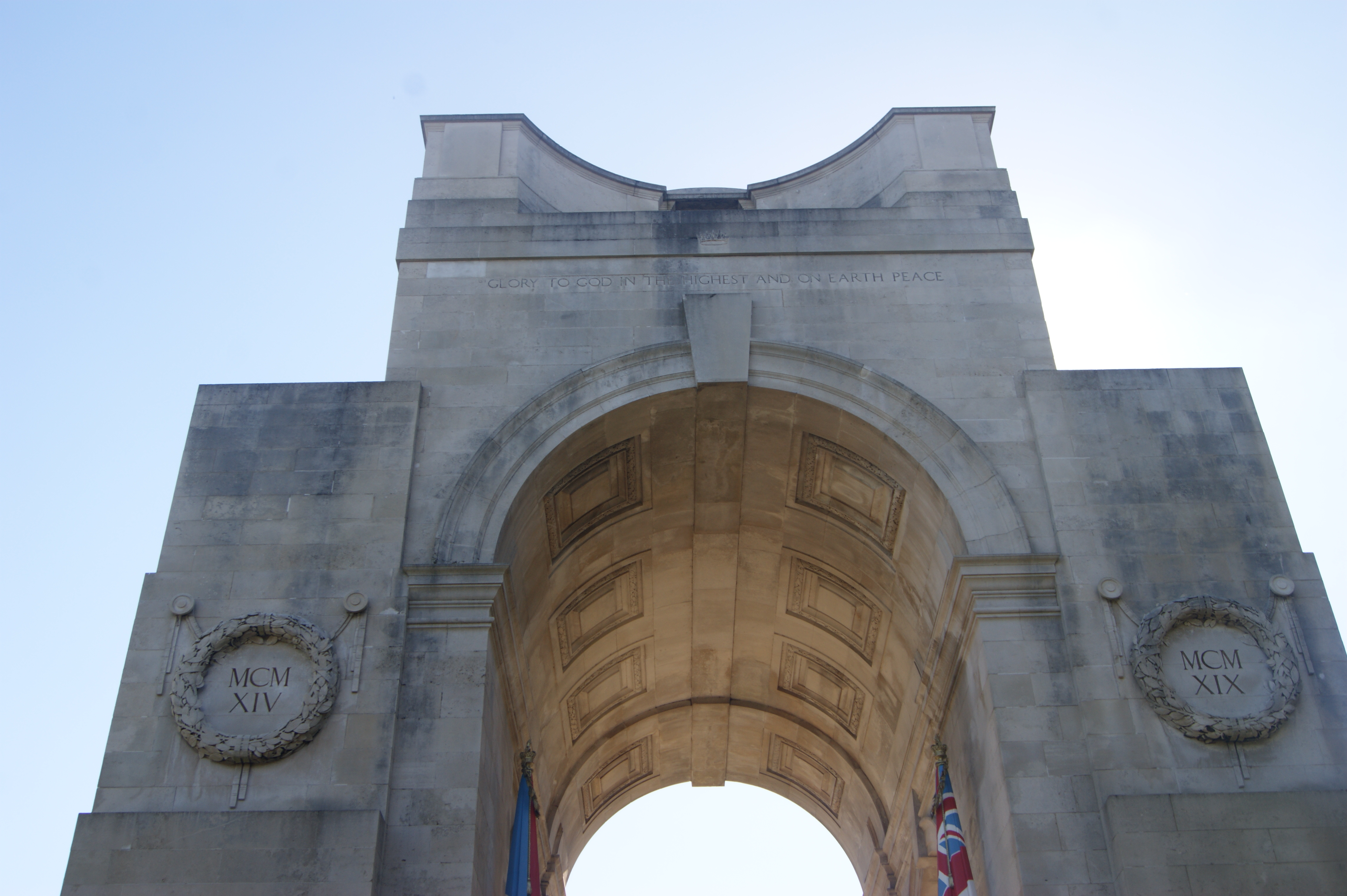
View of the top of the arch showing the flags, wreaths (on the sides), vaulted ceiling, and the dome at the summit

The memorial, in Portland stone, is a square-plan arch with four legs (piers; a tetrapylon or quadrifrons) which dominates the surrounding level ground. It is 69 feet 4 1/4 inches (21 metres) tall, with large arched openings on the main axis (north-west to south-east), and smaller, lower arches on the north-east and south-west sides. The widths, heights and depths of the arches are in simple 2:4:1 proportions: the larger arches are 18 feet (5.5 m) wide, 36 feet (11 m) tall and 9 feet (2.7 m) deep; and the smaller arches are 12 feet (3.7 m) wide, 24 feet (7.3 m) tall and 6 feet (1.8 m) deep. Stone wreaths are carved in relief on the legs at the front (north-west side, facing University Road) and rear of the largest arch; inside these are carved the dates of the First World War: MCM XIV (1914) on the left side, and MCM XIX (1919) on the right. The structure is topped with a dome (attic), stepped back and concave at the front and rear. The city's coat of arms is carved in relief on the rear, surrounded by large swags.

The larger arches on the main axis form a coffered, barrel vault ceiling, crossed by the lower arches to either side. The main axis is aligned so the sun would have been at its centre at sunrise on Armistice Day, 11 November (trees and buildings to the south have lowered the apparent horizon since the memorial was built, meaning the sun appears to be slightly off-centre). Four painted stone flags are set inside the archway, raised on corbels on the inside of the legs: the Union Flag (representing the British Army) and the flag of the Royal Navy (the White Ensign) at the front, and the flags of the Merchant Navy (the Red Ensign), and Royal Air Force (the Royal Air Force Ensign) at the rear. Painted stone flags are a recurring feature in Lutyens's war memorial designs; he first proposed them for the Cenotaph, where they were rejected in favour of fabric, though they feature on several of his other designs besides Leicester (other examples include Northampton War Memorial and Rochdale Cenotaph).

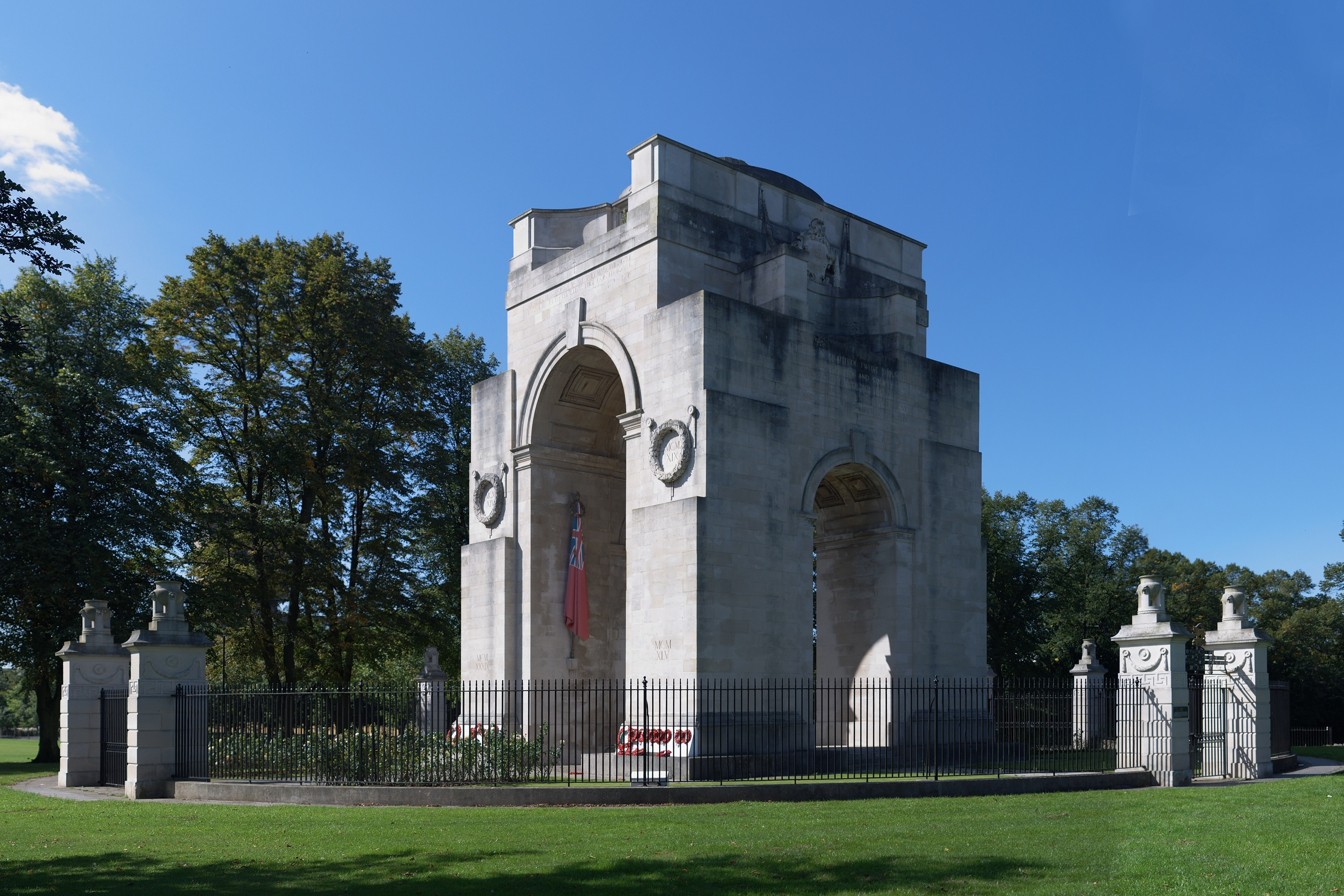
Oblique view from the north east showing the arch and the enclosure. The Peace Walk leading to the University Road gates runs parallel to the tree line on the right; the path to the London Road gates is behind the camera.

Above the front arch (facing University Road) is the inscription GLORY TO GOD IN THE HIGHEST AND ON EARTH PEACE and on the opposite side (facing the park), ALL THEY HOPED FOR, ALL THEY HAD, THEY GAVE TO SAVE MANKIND – THEMSELVES THEY SCORNED TO SAVE from the hymn "O Valiant Hearts". Inscriptions lower down, facing into the park, were added later to display the dates of the Second World War: MCM XXXIX (1939) and MCM XLV (1945). The side arches also have inscriptions. The north-east arch (left, when viewed from the direction of University Road) reads REMEMBER IN GRATITUDE TWELVE THOUSAND MEN OF THIS CITY AND COUNTY WHO FOUGHT AND DIED FOR FREEDOM. REMEMBER ALL WHO SERVED AND STROVE AND THOSE WHO PATIENTLY ENDURED; the right (south-west) arch contains an excerpt from William Blake's poem "And did those feet in ancient time": I WILL NOT CEASE FROM MENTAL FIGHT NOR SHALL MY SWORD SLEEP IN MY HAND TILL WE HAVE BUILT JERUSALEM IN ENGLAND'S GREEN AND PLEASANT LAND.

The memorial is encircled by iron railings, which are pierced by four pairs of stone piers supporting gates opposite each arch (the arch was not intended to be passed through and the gates are kept closed). The piers are decorated with meanders (Greek key patterns) and swags and topped by stone urns, similar to the one on Lutyens's Royal Berkshire Regiment War Memorial in Reading.

Arches are a relatively uncommon form of memorial, particularly for the First World War. Leicester's is one of three by Lutyens and the only one in Britain, the other two being the Thiepval Memorial on the Somme in France (unveiled in 1932) and the India Gate (originally named the All India War Memorial, unveiled in 1931) in New Delhi. The India Gate in particular bears a close resemblance to the Arch of Remembrance, though it is nearly twice its height; Thiepval is a much more complex structure, using multiple interlocking arches to form one, much larger, arch. Lutyens proposed an arch with a dome similar to Leicester's for an IWGC memorial at Saint-Quentin in France in 1924, though this was later abandoned in favour of the Thiepval Memorial. The three arches that were built and the abandoned proposal all share a strong visual resemblance.

=== Setting ===
The arch is situated on the highest point of Victoria Park, dominating its surroundings. It is visible for a considerable distance down Lancaster Road (which leads to the park from the city centre), and from London Road (the A6) and Welford Road, the two main routes out of Leicester to the south. At the time of the memorial's construction, the area was much more open and the arch would have been visible from a greater distance, including from the railway to the south-west. Development in the area through the 20th century, including the buildings of the University of Leicester, now partially obscure the view.

The setting was enhanced when, following the death of his wife in the 1930s, North commissioned Lutyens to design two processional entrances to Victoria Park, leading to the war memorial, as a gift to the city. Lutyens produced a pair of lodges and gates at the Granville Road entrance to Victoria Park, to the north-east of the memorial, and a set of gates and gate piers to the north-west, leading out onto University Road. The lodges are single-storey rectangular pavilions which flank the gates. The external walls are stuccoed, giving the effect of ashlar, with quoins at the angles and large sash windows. Both have architraves above the doorways and a pulvinated frieze below the pyramidal slate roofs and large chimney stacks. The four gate piers are made of ashlar, matching the lodges. They support ornate iron gates which feature an overthrow incorporating Leicester's coat of arms. The gate piers at the University Road entrance are in Portland stone, matching the memorial, decorated with Tuscan pilasters and topped with an entablature and tall urns. They support two smaller pedestrian gates, one each side of a central pair. Above the central gates is an overthrow, again featuring the city's coat of arms. A processional way leads from both entrances to the war memorial, where the two paths meet. The 150-metre (490-foot) long path from the memorial to the University Road gates is known as the Peace Walk (formerly War Memorial Approach) and is lined by shrub borders and formal flower beds.

The access from the London Road entrance was laid out in 2016 as a ceremonial approach to the war memorial from the University Road entrance to Victoria Park.

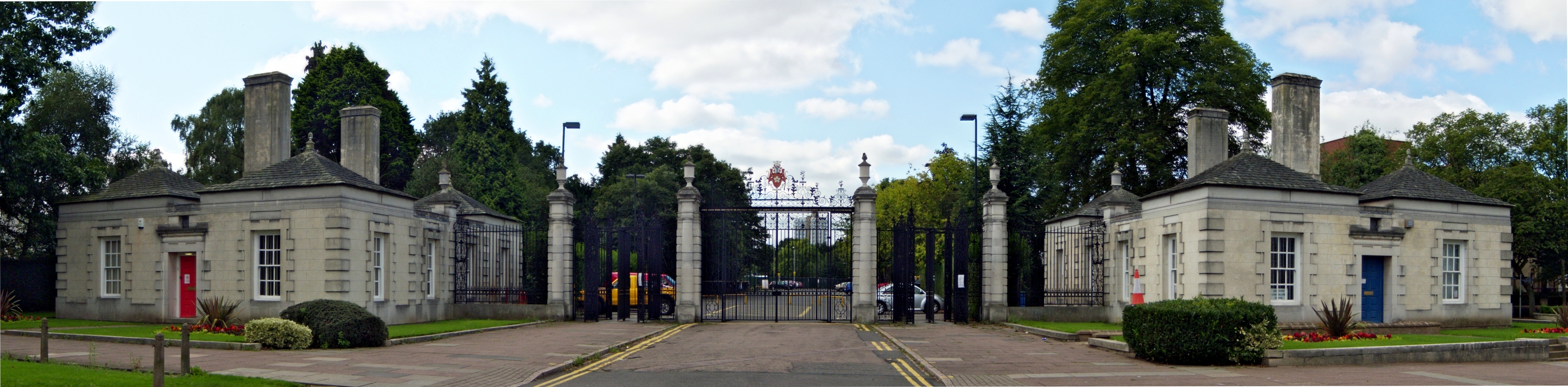
The London Road entrance to Victoria Park. The lodges and gates were a gift from Sir Jonathan North in memory of his wife; Lutyens designed them to complement the war memorial.

== History ==
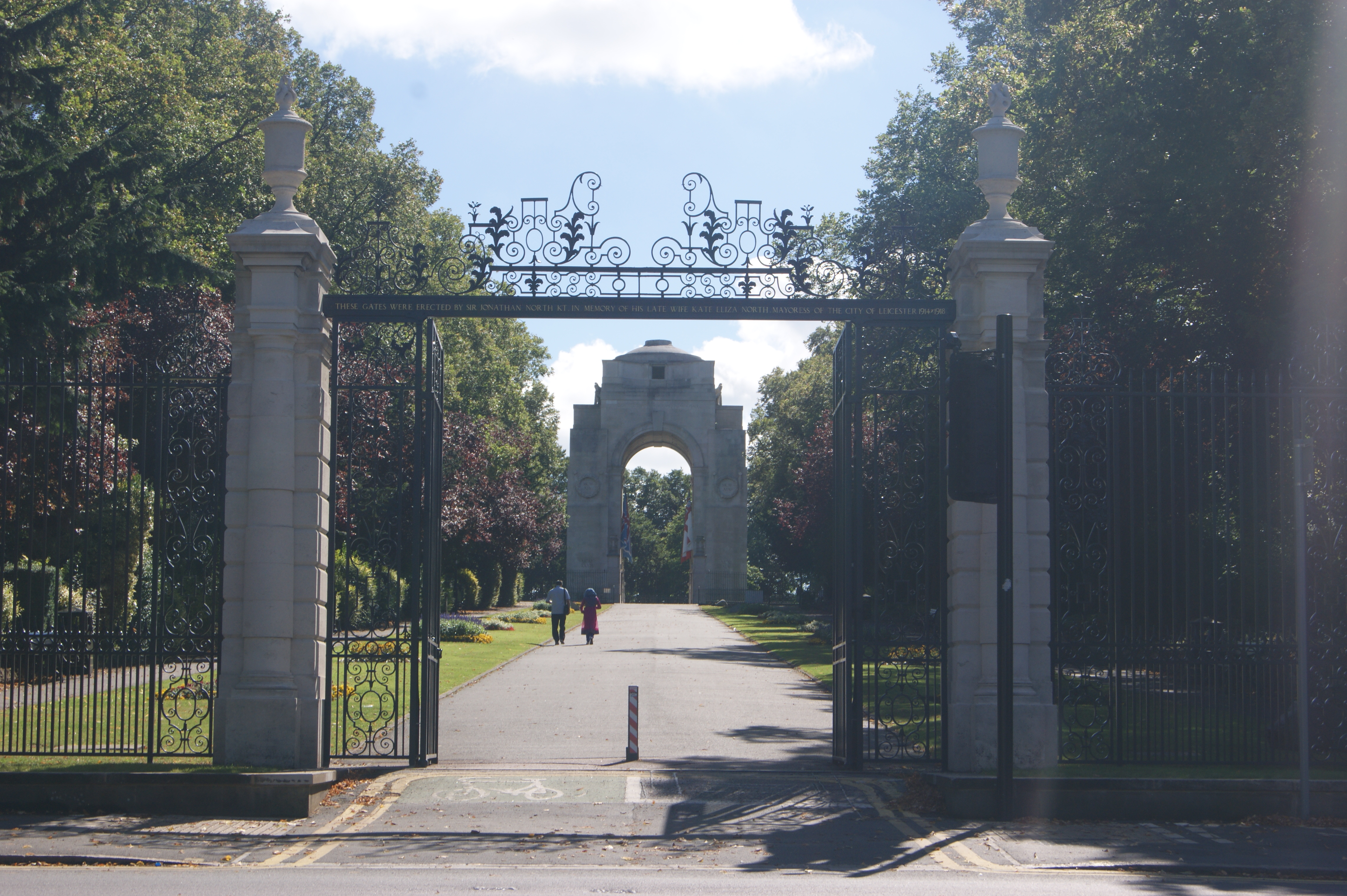
The memorial and Peace Walk seen from the University Road gates

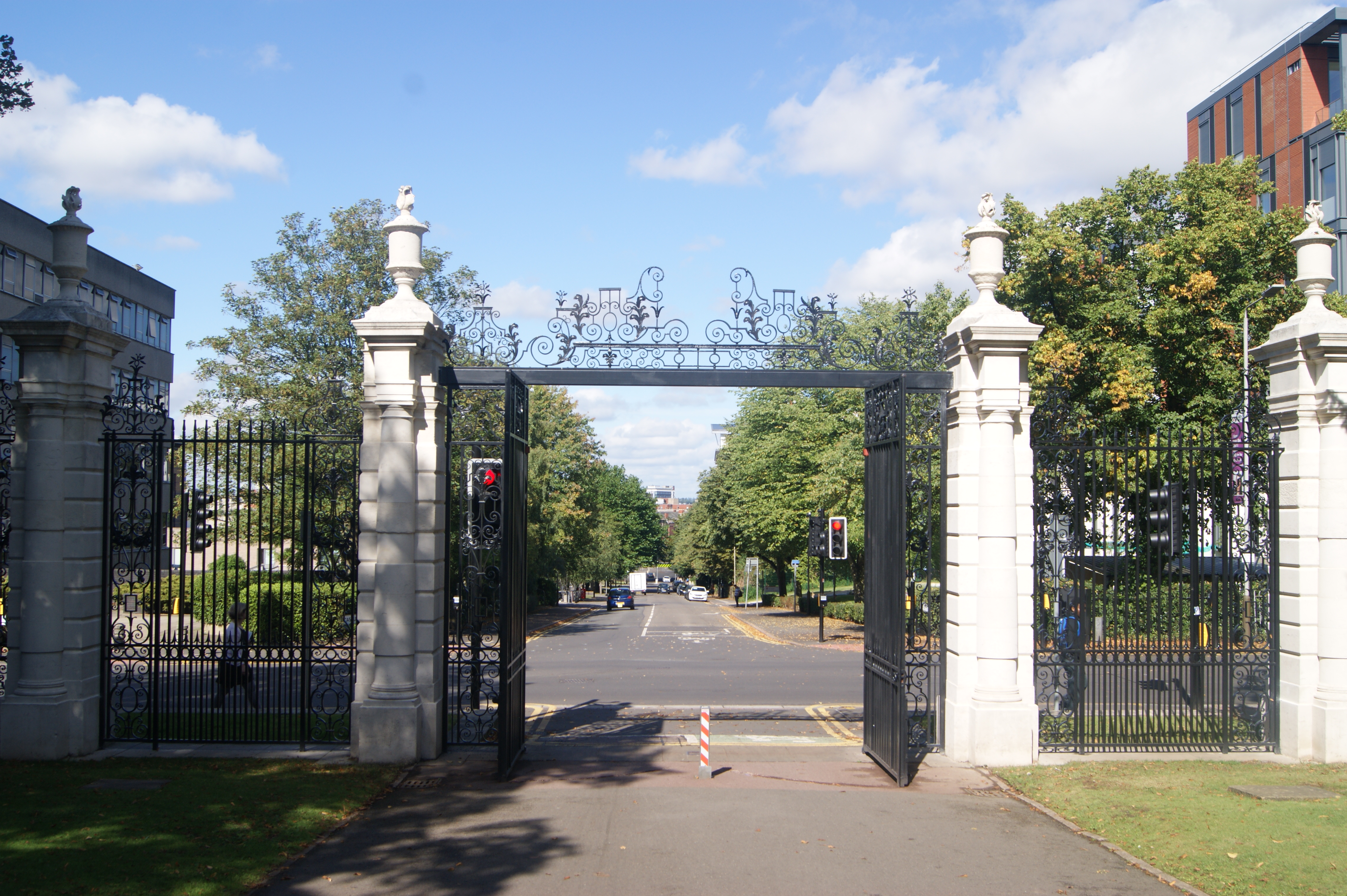
The University Road gates seen from the Peace Walk facing away from the memorial

The arch was unveiled on 4 July 1925 by two local widows, Mrs Elizabeth Butler and Mrs Annie Glover, in front of 30,000 people, including Lutyens and local dignitaries. Eight of Butler's sons served in the army during the war, of whom four were killed in action; Glover lost three sons, along with two nephews and two brothers-in-law. The memorial was dedicated by Cyril Bardsley, Bishop of Peterborough, to the 12,000 men from Leicester and Leicestershire killed during the First World War. The total cost of the memorial was £27,000, of which £1,635 was Lutyens's fee and expenses. At the time of the unveiling, only £16,000 had been raised and by the end of 1925, the committee still had a shortfall of £5,500, which the five guarantors repaid to the bank out of their own pockets. The sum spent was similar to that raised for Rochdale Cenotaph, but the committee in Leicester decided to spend the entire sum on a monument (rather than a fund for wounded servicemen or war widows as in Rochdale), with the result that Leicester's is Lutyens's largest war memorial in Britain. It is described by Historic England as "the most imposing of Lutyens' English war memorials" and by Lutyens's biographer Christopher Hussey as one of Lutyens's "most spectacular" memorials, "in appearance and setting". Another biographer, Tim Skelton, laments that the memorial could have been yet more impressive had the commissioning process been smoother.

Reporting on the unveiling, the local newspaper, the Leicester Advertiser praised the design but stridently criticised the war memorial committee, describing it as a "disgrace" that

nearly seven years after the cessation of hostilities we should be touting around to get money to pay for what should have been bought and paid for at least five years ago. It could have been obtained then quite easily, but dilatoriness on the part of those who had control and a lack of tact in dealing with the public caused the whole thing to fall flat.

The paper went on to compare the scheme with the carillon erected as a war memorial in the nearby town of Loughborough, noting that "Leicester, though some eight times as big as Loughborough, has had a struggle to raise as much money as Loughborough has already spent".

A ceremony is held at the memorial every year on Remembrance Sunday. In 2017, the memorial was twinned with the India Gate in New Delhi to honour members of the Indian Labour Corps who served in the First World War. As part of the ceremonies, India's high commissioner to Britain laid a wreath at the Arch of Remembrance and Britain's high commissioner to India laid one at the India Gate. In 2018, Leicester City Council commissioned photography of the arch using a drone to reach parts of the memorial that cannot be viewed from the ground.

The arch was designated a Grade II* listed building in 1955 and upgraded to Grade I in 1996. The gates and gate piers leading to University Road are separately listed at Grade II*. Victoria Park itself is listed at Grade II on the Register of Historic Parks and Gardens. Listed status provides legal protection from demolition or modification; Grade II* is applied to "particularly important buildings of more than special interest" and applies to about 5.5 per cent of listed buildings. Grade I is reserved for buildings of "exceptional interest" and applied to only 2.5 per cent of listings. The Arch of Remembrance was one of 44 works included in a national collection of Lutyens's war memorials, designated by Historic England in November 2015 as part of commemorations for the centenary of the First World War.

== See also ==
Other war memorials:

- Anglo-Boer War Memorial (Johannesburg), an earlier war memorial arch by Lutyens
- Midland Railway War Memorial, another Lutyens memorial, in nearby Derby
- City War Memorial, Nottingham, another First World War memorial arch in a nearby city

Lists:

- Grade I listed buildings in Leicester
- Grade I listed war memorials in England
