= Leicester Pride =

Annual LGBT event in Leicester, England

Coordinates: 52.6242°N 1.1185°W

- People with signs advocating for trans rights at Leicester Pride, 2026
- Genre: Pride parade
- Frequency: Annually
- Location: Abbey Park
- Inaugurated: 2000 (26 years ago)
- Website: leicesterpride.co.uk

Leicester Pride is an annual LGBT pride event hosted by an organization of the same name in Leicester, England, which was founded in 2000.

Leicester Pride usually takes place around the end of August/early September each year, including the parade through the City Centre before heading out to Abbey Park for the main event lasting until around 9pm with further events running into the later evening at some of the gay bars and clubs in Leicester.

== Events ==
The event is supported by local businesses including Sytner Group and Walkers Crisps. Until 2023, the main events were held at Victoria Park but were required to be moved to Abby Park as a result of the Party in the park events hosted by BBC Radio 2.

=== Parade ===
The parade begins at the Curve Theatre looping through the City Centre to Abbey Park. In 2019 the parade had over 2,000 participants. In 2026, that number had grown to over 3,500.

== History ==
=== The first march ===
Newarke Street, where the Leicester LGBTQ+ Centre is located

In 1999, the owners of several gay bars in Leicester collaborated to host a Mardi Gras event for the LGBTQ+ community. The event was shut down due to complaints residents sent to the Leicester Mercury. Another event was proposed in March of 2000, a group called the Silent Majority petitioned the city council to shut it down. After several more months of planning and negotiation with the city council, Leicester's first gay pride was held on 29 July 2000. It was supported by Arts Council England.

The event started outside of the Leicester LGBTQ+ Centre and had five hundred attendees. At the front of the march was a large banner reading "Unity Against Prejudice", followed by a samba band. Participants carried signs protesting Section 28 and calling for equalized age of consent. Several groups counterprotested the march, including the Silent Majority, a group of neonazis, and members of the National Front. The march ended at Abbey Park.

=== Later events ===
In 2025, all involvement from political parties was suspended from the festival due to the lack of political support for trans and nonbinary people.

=== Timeline ===
Year	Date	Notable guests	Notes
2000	July 29		
2001			
2002			
2003	June 21		Theme was "Hollywood to Bollywood"
2004	June 19		
2005	June 25		
2006	June 24		Theme was "One step beyond"
2007	Not held		Cancelled due to lack of funding
2008	Not held		Cancelled due to lack of funding
2009			First year with current team
2010	September 4		
2011	September 3		Theme was "Atlantis"
2012	September 1		Theme was "Masquerade"
2013	August 31		Theme was "New Romantic"
2014	August 30		
2015	September 5		
2016	September 3		
2017	September 2	Union J	
2018	September 1	La Voix; Robbie Lewis	
2019	August 31	Seann Miley Moore	
2020	Not held		Covid-19 pandemic
2021	September 4	La Voix	
2022	September 3	Jaymi Hensley; George Shelley	
2023	September 2		
2024	August 31		
2025	August 30		
2026	September 5	Jaymi Hensley	
