= Nevill Holt =

Hamlet and civil parish in Leicestershire, England

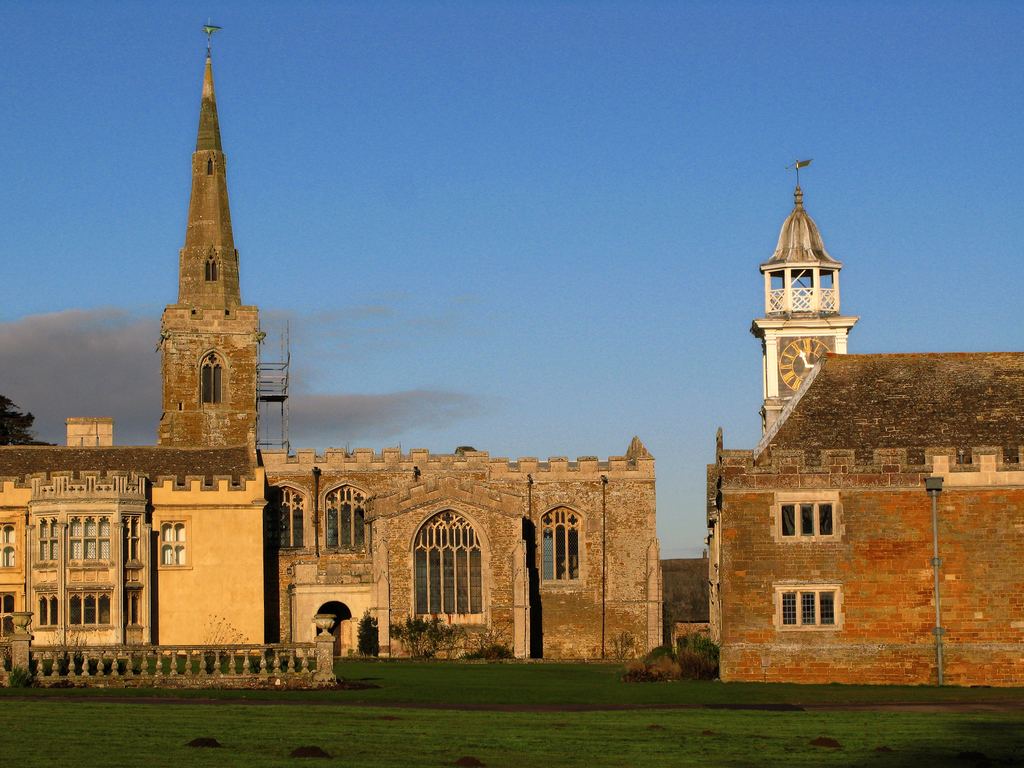
Nevill Holt Hall, church and stable block

Nevill Holt is a hamlet and civil parish in the Harborough District of Leicestershire, England. It is situated about 6 miles (10 km) northeast of Market Harborough, 5 miles (8 km) northwest of Corby and lies close to the borders with Northamptonshire and Rutland. It is on the north side of the Welland valley. According to the 2001 census the parish had a population of 28. At the 2011 census the population remained less than 100 and was included in the civil parish of Horninghold.

Bradley Priory was an Augustinian priory in the parish.

== Nevill Holt Hall ==
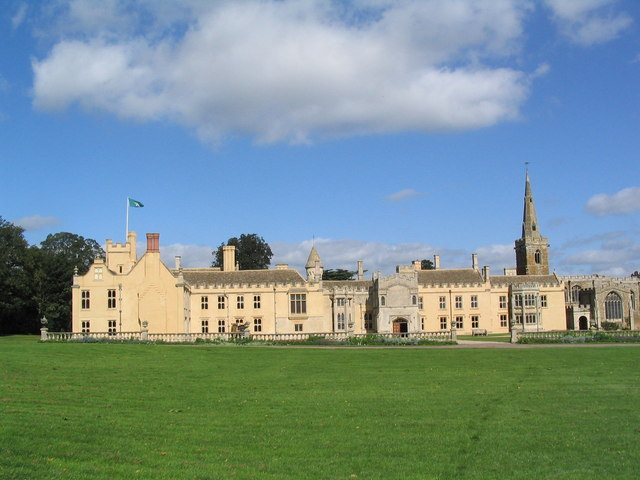
Nevill Holt Hall

Nevill Holt Hall is a Grade I listed building, constructed before 1300. Its name is derived from the Nevill family who owned it from the 15th century until 1876. The French abbess Ann Nevill was born here in 1605. It is on a hilltop. There have been many alterations and additions in the 14th,15th,17th,18th,19th and 20th (and now 21st) centuries. The Cunard shipping family owned the estate from 1876 to 1912 and Nancy Cunard (1896–1965), writer, anti-racism and anti-fascism activist, publisher and society hostess, was born here.

In 1919 the hall was bought by Rev. C. A. C. Bowlker and became a preparatory school. Run by the Phillips family from 1928, the school was an IAPS boarding school. In 1998 the school closed due to falling rolls shortly after a child sexual abuse scandal. One teacher was arrested, charged and convicted of sexual offences against boys aged 7–13. Another teacher committed suicide shortly after police arrived with an arrest warrant. The school closed later in 1998 after these events.

In 2000, the Hall was bought and restored by Carphone Warehouse co-founder David Ross who had visited the prep school which a friend of his at Uppingham School had attended. Ross has built a theatre to seat 350 within the 17th-century stable courtyard which had formerly housed a science laboratory, games/common room, carpentry workshop, indoor swimming pool, boxing ring and classrooms. In the summer, the estate hosts the Nevill Holt Opera festival. A new 400-seat opera house in the stable block by architects Witherford Watson Mann opened on 14 June 2018. The opera house won the 2019 RIBA National Award and made the shortlist for the 2019 Stirling Prize for excellence in architecture. The 2021 festival was held in the open air, due to COVID-19 restrictions; the two operas performed were La Traviata and Don Giovanni.

== The Church ==
The church forms a group of buildings with the Hall. Dedicated to St Mary it dates largely from the 13th century but has had many perpendicular features added. The south porch was added in 1635. It was restored in 1865 to designs by architects Goddard & Son and again in 1878.

== Quarrying ==
Two attempts were made to quarry the south side of the hill for iron ore in the 19th century. Between 1861 and 1868 small amounts of iron ore were probably taken away by horse and cart. Another attempt was made between 1871 and 1874. In 1873 a self-acting incline was constructed to take the ore to the London and North Western Railway's Market Harborough to Peterborough line. The quarry and traces of the incline remain. Further up the hill limestone was quarried from 1942.
