= Bradley Priory =

Augustinian priory in Leicestershire, England

- Location within Leicestershire
- Interactive map of Bradley Priory

Monastery information
- Order: Augustinian
- Established: C.1220-34
- Disestablished: 1536
- Diocese: Diocese of Lincoln

Site
- Location: Nevill Holt, Leicestershire, England
- Coordinates: 52.550275°N 0.787239°W
- Grid reference: SK50211452
- Visible remains: None. Earthworks show the boundaries of the precinct.

Bradley Priory was an Augustinian priory in the parish of Nevill Holt, Leicestershire, England.

== History ==
The priory was founded between 1220 and 1234. The first mention of the priory is c. 1233–1234, when Robert Bundy (de Burnebi) is listed as patron. It is thought Robert may have been the founder of the priory.

The priory was only very small and as such was not always granted its own prior. For example, John Penny served as both prior of Bradley and Abbot of Leicester Abbey. In 1535, there were only two canons at the priory and only a single child at the almonry.

The priory is known to have owned a windmill at Holt since it was founded and gained the manor of Blaston in 1385. In the Valor Ecclesiasticus of 1535, the priory is recorded as owning land in Blaston, Slawston, Holt and Holyoak, and had a total income of just over £20.

The priory was dissolved c. 1536, and the prior was granted an annual pension of £4. In 1537, the site was granted to Humphrey Nevill.

The site today is occupied by Priory Farm. Nothing remains of the priory building, although earthworks exist showing the precinct boundaries.

== Priors of Bradley ==
- Robert, elected 1233–4.
- Henry, appointed by the Bishop of Lincoln, 1263.
- Walter of Drayton, confirmed 1290, resigned 1295.
- John of Kirkby, confirmed 1295.
- Walter of Drayton, elected 1300, deprived 1302.
- John of Quorndon, elected 1302, occurs 1309.
- Richard of Brownknave, elected 1381,
- Richard Chanon, occurs 1389.
- Richard Stokes, resigned 1393.
- William Wenge, elected 1393, died 1415.
- John Coventry, elected 1415.
- Henry Medburn, resigned 1481.
- Thomas Leicester, died 1493.
- Thomas Horninghold, elected 1493, resigned 1503.
- John Penny, Abbot of Leicester, admitted 1503, resigned 1508.
- John Oundle, confirmed 1509
