= The City Rooms, Leicester =

The City Rooms
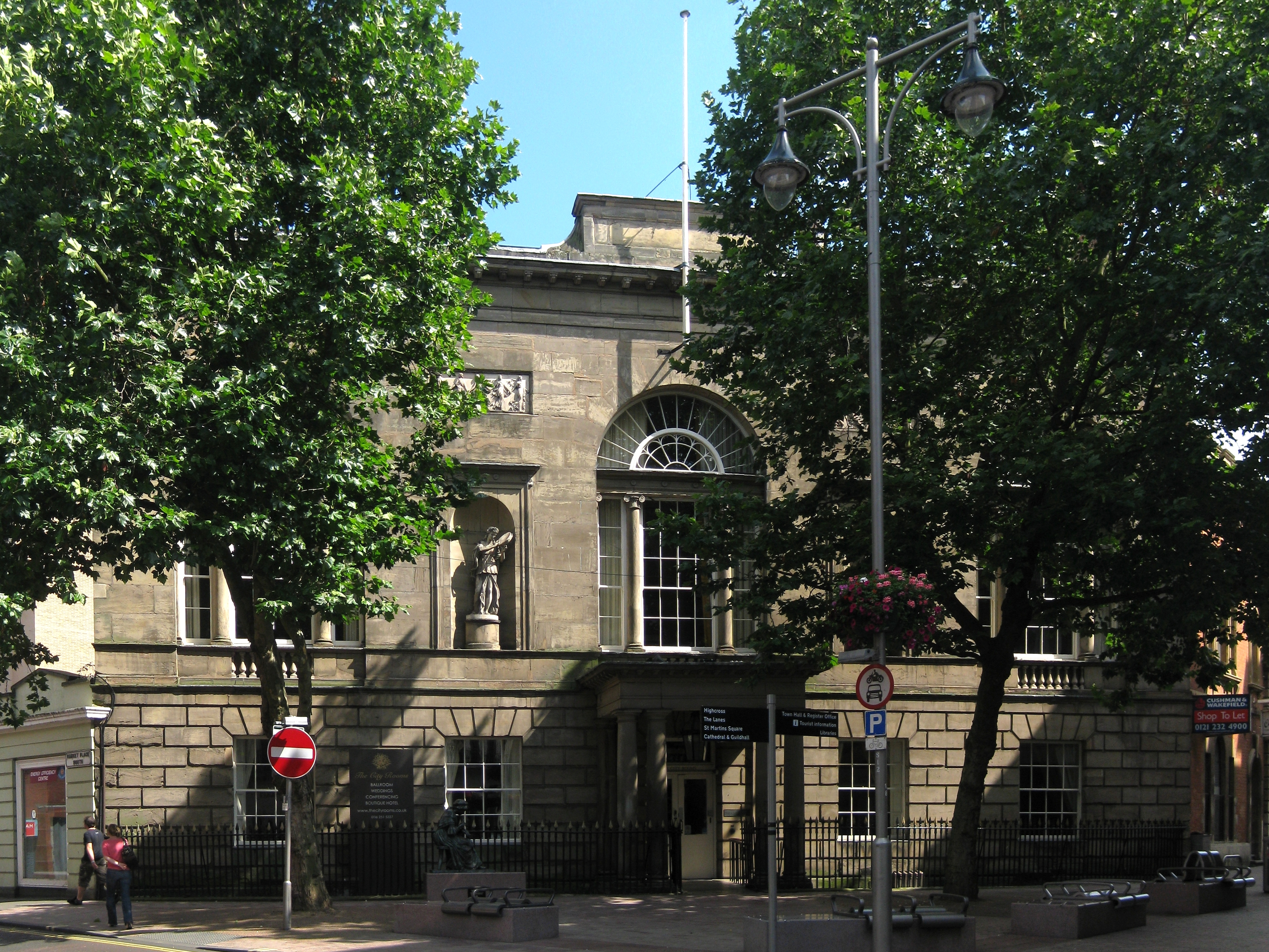

- Location within Leicestershire
- 52.6337°N 1.1342°W
- Location: Leicester, Leicestershire, England

History
- Built: 1800; 226 years ago

Site notes
- Architect: John Johnson
- Architectural style: Greek Revival style
- Website: www.thecityrooms.co.uk

Listed Building – Grade I
- Official name: Assembly Rooms (County Rooms)
- Designated: 1950
- Reference no.: 1184114

The City Rooms is located in Hotel Street in the City of Leicester in England. It has been designated by English Heritage as a Grade I listed building.

== History ==
The building, which was designed by John Johnson in the Greek Revival style, was completed in 1800. It was originally commissioned as Leicester's first hotel but the developer did have enough resources to complete it as such and, in 1799, sold it to a consortium led by the Duke of Rutland, who raised by public subscription the sum of £3,300 still needed to complete it. It opened as the Leicester Assembly Rooms on 17 September 1800 just in time to host the visitors to the Leicester Races held at Victoria Park.

The design for the building involved a symmetrical main frontage of five bays on the corner of Hotel Street and Market Place South; the central bay featured a porch with paired Tuscan order columns supporting an entablature; there was a large rounded headed window on the first floor flanked by two niches containing female musicians carved by John Charles Felix Rossi and two more large round headed windows beyond that. Above the figures are two decorative friezes, 'Borghese Dancers' in Coade stone, as well as capitals, balusters, paterae and small decorative faces in the same material. Internally, there was a large ballroom (75 feet (23 m) long, 33 feet (10 m) wide and 30 feet (9.1 m) high) on the first floor which was decorated with allegorical paintings by Ramsay Richard Reinagle and with statues based on models by John Bacon.

In 1817 the building was adapted to become the judges' lodgings; the conversion, which was undertaken by a local builder, Joshua Harrison, took two years to complete and once the building had passed into the ownership of the justices, it became known as the County Rooms. Following the implementation of the Local Government Act 1888, which established county councils in every county, it also became the meeting place of Leicestershire County Council. The building was in high demand and it was even used as a training facility by B Squadron, the Leicestershire Yeomanry at that time.

After County Hall was completed in 1967, the county council had limited use for the building and, after it was sold to Leicester City Council in 1986, it became known as The City Rooms. In 1990 a statue of a Seamstress, sculpted by James Butler, was unveiled outside the building: although not intended to represent any particular person, it served as a reminder of the importance that the hosiery industry once played in Leicester.

After the city council decided to sell the building to a developer, an extensive programme of restoration works intended to convert the building into a hotel with highly decorated meeting rooms, a grand ballroom, a bar and four luxurious bedrooms, was completed in 2005. The Prince of Wales attended a reception in the building, held in support of the Midlands Chapter of the British Asian Trust, on 11 February 2020.

== See also ==
- Grade I listed buildings in Leicester
