= Mix Munkies =

UK musical group

Robbie Lewis (born 30 August 1986), and Sam Milan (born 24 October 1982), better known together as the Mix Munkies (Mix muhng-kee; from Low German;), are two English DJ's, remixers, and record producers from Leicester, England. Their musical taste and style covers a wide range of genres but is primarily identified as house music. In September 2009, they performed as the headline DJ act at Leicester Pride alongside Blazin' Squad and Sean Rumsey. In January 2010 they performed alongside Lisa Lashes and JFK in front of a capacity crowd at Helsinki nightclub in Leicester.

On 4 September 2010, the Mix Munkies performed as the final act on the main stage at Leicester Pride and in October 2010 they gave their first radio interview on Demon FM.

On 3 September 2011, the Mix Munkies returned to give the final performance at Leicester Pride.

On 10 February 2014, the Mix Munkies released their first commercial track entitled "Control" featuring Mrs P (Rebecca Patel) on Beatport. Releases on iTunes and Spotify followed on 10 March 2014. The release included two remixes by Steve OD and John 'Disgraceland' Stanhope. The Disgraceland remix received critical acclaim from established house music blog Do Androids Dance.

== Discography ==
- Control ft. Mrs P (Proud Runs Deep)

Several remixes produced by the Mix Munkies have been featured on 107 Spark FM in Sunderland. On 5 February 2010, the Mix Munkies remix of "Move, Shake, Drop" made its debut at number 1 in the "Passion to dance top 10" and held a top 10 position for three weeks.

=== Remixes and productions ===
- Missy Elliott - 4 My People (Mix Munkies remix)
- Mix Munkies & Mrs P - Control
- Breach - Jack (Mix Munkies remix)
- Khia - My Neck, My Back (Lick It) (Mix Munkies remix)
- Blu Cantrell feat. Sean Paul - Breathe (Mix Munkies remix)
- Gorgon City - Real ft. Yasmin (Mix Munkies jackin VIP refix)
- Gorgon City - Real ft. Yasmin (Mix Munkies jackin remix)
- Donae'o - Party Hard (Mix Munkies edit)
- Mix Munkies ft. JiGGie & Nina Marie - Trouble
- Dizzee Rascal - Bassline Junkie (Mix Munkies bootleg)
- Lil Silva - Different vs. Whoomp there it is (Mix Munkies mash up)
- Nina Marie ft. Jiggie - Champerz (Mix Munkies remix)
- Junior Senior - Move your feet (Mix Munkies edit)
- DJ Zinc vs. BBK - Too Many Nexx Man (Mix Munkies mash up)
- DJ Zinc vs. Dev - 128 bass (Mix Munkies mash up)
- DJ Zinc vs. BBK - Too Many Nexx Man (Mix Munkies mashup)
- Ding Dong - Bad man forward (Mix Munkies Dutch remix)
- Far East Movement ft. The Cataracts - Like a G6 (Mix Munkies remix)
- Gyptian - Hold you (Mix Munkies remix)
- Katy B ft. Ms Dynamite - Lights on (Mix Munkies club mix)
- Chezza & The Beat - Pretty blue eyes (Mix Munkies club mix)
- The Black Eyed Peas - My Humps (Mix Munkies Dutch remix)
- DJ Laz ft. Flo Rida & Casely - Move Shake Drop Remix (Mix Munkies 2010 revisit)
- The Black Eyed Peas - My Humps (Mix Munkies remix)
- Hadouken! - Mic Check (Mix Munkies remix)
- Chris Brown ft. Lil Wayne & Swiss beatz - I can transform ya (Mix Munkies remix)
- Kelis - Milkshake (Mix Munkies remix)
- The Black Eyed Peas - "I Gotta Feeling" (Mix Munkies remix)
- David Guetta ft. Akon vs. Pink - Let's get this sexy bitch started (Mix Munkies mash up)
- Fedde Le Grand vs. Dizzee Rascal - Scared of old skewl (Mix Munkies mash up)
- The Black Eyed Peas - Boom Boom Pow (Mix Munkies Bimbo Night Mix)
- Lily Allen - LDN (Mix Munkies UK Funky Remix)
