= Henry Nevill, 9th Baron Bergavenny =

English iron founder, soldier and politician

Henry Neville
- Baron Bergavenny
- Born: c. 1570
- Died: December 1641
- Noble family: House of Neville
- Spouses: Lady Mary Sackville; Catherine Vaux
- Issue: Sir Thomas Nevill; Cecily Nevill; Anne Nevill; Elizabeth Nevill; Mary Nevill; John Nevill, 10th Baron Bergavenny; George Nevill, 11th Baron Bergavenny; Frances Nevill; Catherine Nevill; Elizabeth Nevill
- Father: Edward Nevill, 8th Baron Bergavenny
- Mother: Rachel Lennard

Henry Nevill, de facto 9th (de jure 2nd) Baron Bergavenny (c. 1570 – December 1641) was an English iron founder, soldier and politician who sat in the House of Commons at various times between 1601 and 1622 when he inherited the Baron Bergavenny peerage.

== Life ==
Nevill was the son of Edward Nevill, 8th Baron Bergavenny and his wife Rachel Lennard, daughter of John Lennard. He was educated at Queens' College, Cambridge in 1586 and was awarded BA in 1589. He was incorporated at Oxford University and awarded MA in 1594.

== Recusant ==
He then travelled abroad and was at Venice in July 1594 where he was approached by English Catholics, presumably with the intention of involving him in one of the numerous conspiracies against Elizabeth I which were rife in that decade. Nevill conformed outwardly to the Church of England, but was generally believed to be a Roman Catholic at heart. His first wife, Lady Mary Sackville, was a confirmed Catholic who taught her children to follow that faith. His beliefs are also evidenced by his second marriage to Catherine Vaux, who belonged to a notable recusant family. Her mother, Elizabeth Vaux (née Roper) sheltered Catholic priests at the family home at Harrowden Hall, and her brother Lord Vaux fled the country after being suspected of complicity in the Gunpowder Plot; on his return to England in 1611 he was imprisoned for two years. Later generations of the Nevill family openly professed the Catholic faith, and followed Henry's example in marrying into well-known recusant families like the Giffords and Chamberlains.

== Military and political career ==
In 1596 he served at the Capture of Cádiz under Robert Devereux, 2nd Earl of Essex and was knighted. In June 1597 he was licensed to travel abroad for two years with his brother-in-law Thomas Sackville, son of Lord Buckhurst, later Earl of Dorset. Buckhurst and Nevill owned several iron foundries between them, and by December 1596 they had a patent which gave them a monopoly in the production of ordinance.

In 1601 Nevill was elected Member of Parliament for Kent. He took no part in Essex's Rebellion, though he was apparently invited to do so. During this parliament Nevill's patent was mentioned during an attack on monopolies. Nevill is mentioned sitting on a committee considering the Penal Laws on 2 November, somewhat ironically in view of his own well-known Catholic leanings. In 1604, he was elected MP for Lewes. In 1621 he was elected MP for Wilton and sat until 1622 when he succeeded to the Barony upon the death of his father.

Nevill died in 1641.

== Family ==
Nevill married firstly Lady Mary Sackville (d. February 1612), daughter of Thomas Sackville, 1st Earl of Dorset and Cicely Baker, with whom he had the following children:

- Sir Thomas Nevill (b. bef. 1610–1628); married Frances Mordaunt, daughter of the 4th Baron Mordaunt, and had two sons who died young and a daughter Margaret;
- Cecily Nevill (c. 1600 – c. 1654), who in 1617 married Fitzwilliam Coningsby; they were the grandparents of Thomas Coningsby, 1st Earl Coningsby;
- Mary (Anne in religion) Nevill (1605–1689), a Benedictine nun at an English convent in Ghent and then abbess at the English Benedictines of Pontoise from 1667 to 1689
- Elizabeth Nevill (b. bef. 1641)

He then married Catherine Vaux, daughter of George Vaux and Elizabeth Roper, and sister of Edward Vaux, 4th Baron Vaux of Harrowden, with whom he had the following children:

- John Nevill, 10th Baron Bergavenny (c. 1614–1662)
- George Nevill, 11th Baron Bergavenny (c. 1615–1666)
- Frances Nevill (b. bef. 1641)
- Catherine Nevill (died after 1654) who married firstly Sir Robert Howard and secondly John Berry
- Elizabeth Nevill (c. 1626–1662) who married in 1651 Thomas Stoner (1626–1683)—a descendant of William de la Pole, 1st Duke of Suffolk and Alice Chaucer

Parliament of England
Preceded by Sir Robert Sidney; Percival Hart	Member of Parliament for Kent; 1601; With: Francis Fane	Succeeded by Sir John Scott; Sir John Lewson
Preceded by George Goring II; Sir Percival Hart	Member of Parliament for Lewes; 1604–1611; With: John Shirley	Succeeded by Christopher Neville; Richard Amhurst
Preceded by Sir Robert Sidney; Thomas Morgan	Member of Parliament for Wilton; 1621; With: Sir Thomas Tracy	Succeeded by Thomas Morgan; Sir Thomas Tracy
Peerage of England
Preceded by Edward Nevill	Baron Bergavenny; 1622–1641	Succeeded by John Nevill
