= Anne Neville (abbess) =

English Roman Catholic nun and royal debt collector

- Born: Mary Neville; 1605; Nevill Holt, Leicestershire
- Died: 15 December 1689 (aged 83–84); Pontoise, France
- Occupation: abbess of Pontoise

Anne Neville born Mary Neville (1605 – 15 December 1689) was an English Roman Catholic nun and royal debt collector who became the abbess of Pontoise near Paris.

== Life ==
She was born in 1605 in Nevill Holt in Leicestershire and she was baptised Mary. Her parents were Lady Mary (born Sackville) and Sir Henry Neville who would later become Lord (A)bergavenny. Her mother was an enthusiastic Catholic who provided her with an education. Her mother died before 1616. Her father married again and her step mother, Catherine Vaux, was from another recusant family.

In 1634 she made her profession as a nun at the Benedictine monastery in Ghent presided over by Mary Vavasour. She was quickly given positions of responsibility. In 1640 there was a new abbess named Mary Knatchbull.

While the exiled Charles II was in Europe, Knatchbull enjoyed a close relationship with the King. The monastery played host to the court and received and passed on letters. Despite the monastery's poor finances, Knatchbull agreed to loan the King substantial sums, to be repaid by the King when he was restored to the throne. Knatchbull played an important role in Charles II's restoration to the throne in 1660, but was not paid the money that was owed to the monastery. The abbess had to go to England twice to pursue repayment and Neville acted as her counsellor.

In June 1663 she and two other nuns were in England where Neville acted as a debt collector. She used her influence to ensure that a £500 annuity, agreed with Knatchbull by the crown, was paid to the Ghent monastery. She also ensured that dowries promised by the families of Ghent nuns were paid. She stayed with the dowager Catherine, Lady Abergavenny, who had been married her half brother John.

After four years in England she returned to the continent in 1667. She stopped at Dunkirk on the way, and was invited to join the English nuns there, but she continued her journey to Ghent. She considered her position and with Mary Knatchbull's permission she soon decided to join a newly founded religious house in Pontoise. It was led by Eugenia Poulton, and when she died later that year Neville was elected to succeed her as abbess.
