= Raw Dykes =

Coordinates: 52°37′4.83″N 1°8′22.91″W

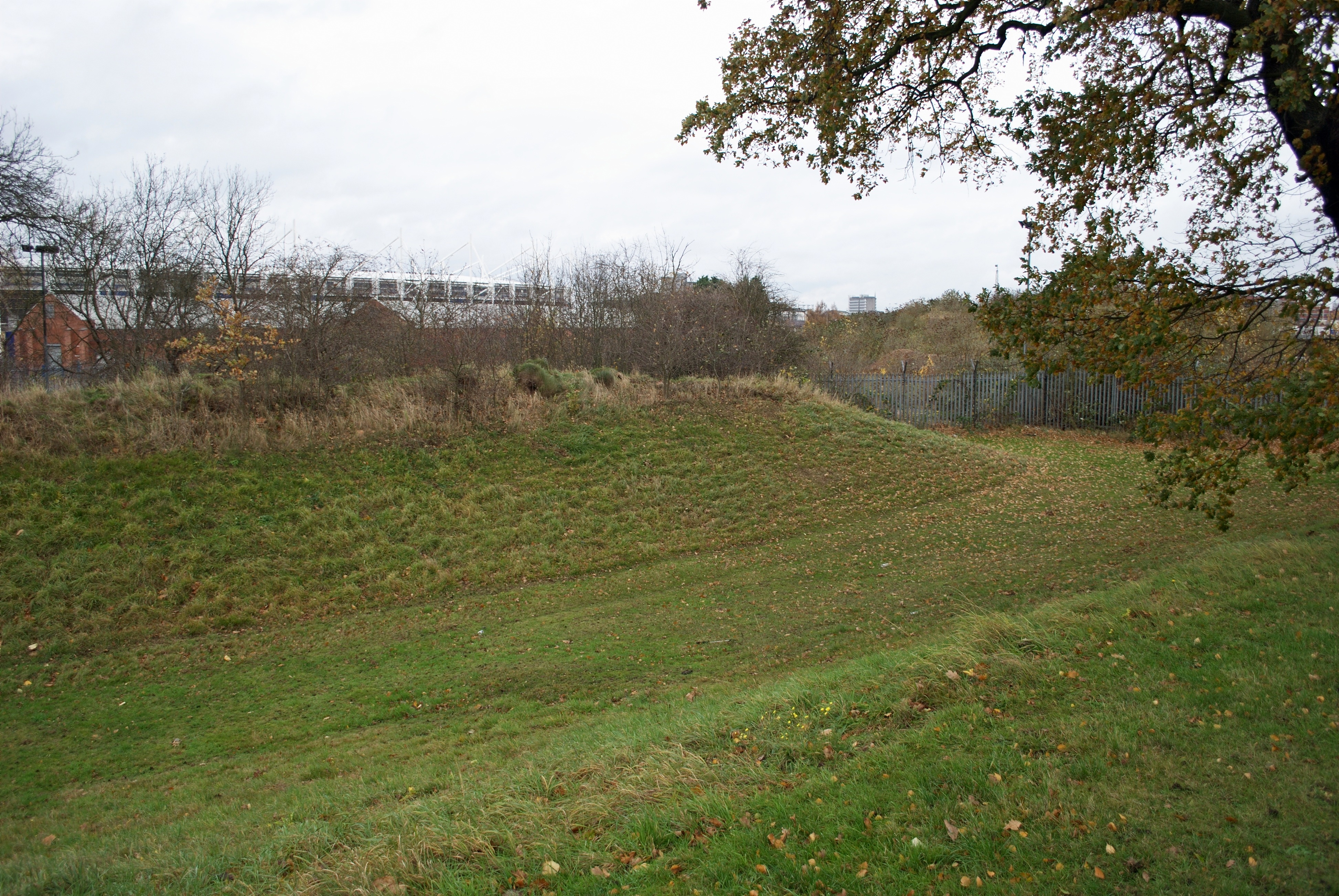
Part of the surviving section of Raw Dykes

Raw Dykes (grid reference SK583026) is a Roman earthwork and scheduled monument in Leicester. The monument consists of two parallel banks up to 20 metres apart, with an excavated channel running between them. A stretch 110 metres long survives, but originally the earthwork was at least 550 metres in length.

The official entry in the schedule of monuments maintained by the Department of Culture, Media and Sport states that the remains are those of a Roman aqueduct, stating that "the narrow cut within the centre of the ditch represented the main water channel and was designed to increase the flow of water by concentrating it within a constricted space". A publication by Leicester City Council has speculated that the earthwork may have been a canal, rather than a source of clean water, but concluded that the aqueduct-interpretation is "by far the most likely suggestion". Kathleen Kenyon, among others, argued that the level of the aqueduct (following the modern 60-metre contour) was lower than the Roman bath in Leicester, and that Raw Dykes was therefore a failure. However, J.S. Wacher has argued that the Romans were skilled hydraulic engineers, and that it is possible that they pumped water into the town from the Raw Dykes aqueduct. There is evidence that they employed a pump and a storage tank at Leicester's Roman baths in the 4th century.

Excavations in 1938 found two Roman pottery sherds from the 1st century AD, indicated that Raw Dykes was constructed during or after this time. The first written reference to the earthwork occurs in the borough of Leicester's accounts from 1322. During the English Civil War, Royalist soldiers used part of the earthwork as an artillery emplacement; it also appears on several 18th- and 19th-century maps. Since the early modern period its length has been greatly shortened by the expansion of Leicester. Members of the public cannot access the site, but a viewing enclosure has been constructed leading off Aylestone Road.
