= John Penny =

English priest

John Penny (died 1520) was an English priest, successively Bishop of Bangor, 1504–1508, and Bishop of Carlisle, 1508–1520. He was also Prior to Bradley Priory 1503–1508.

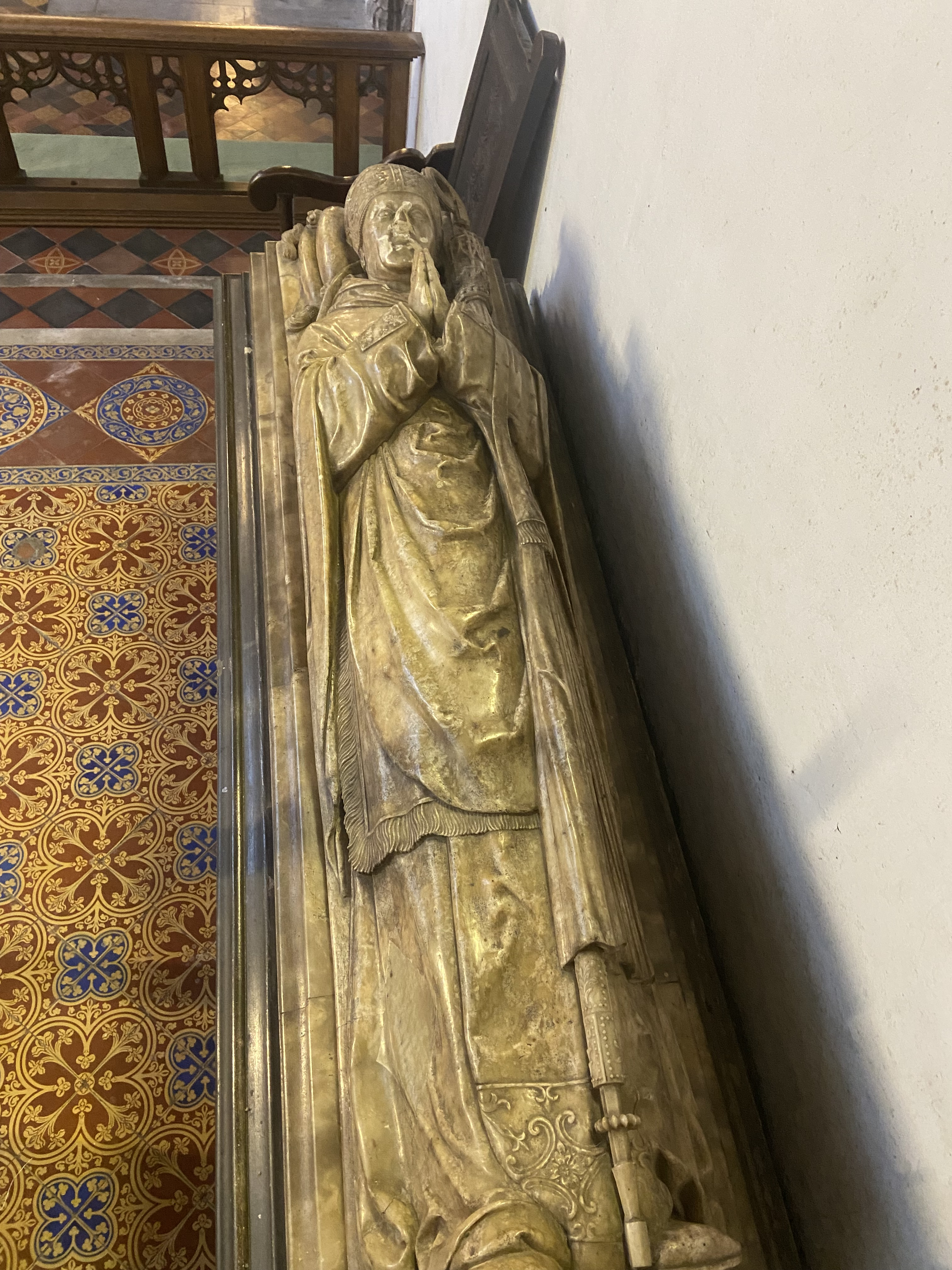
Tomb effigy in St Margaret's Church, Leicester

His namesake father had been Lord Mayor of Leicester in 1481-2.

== Career ==
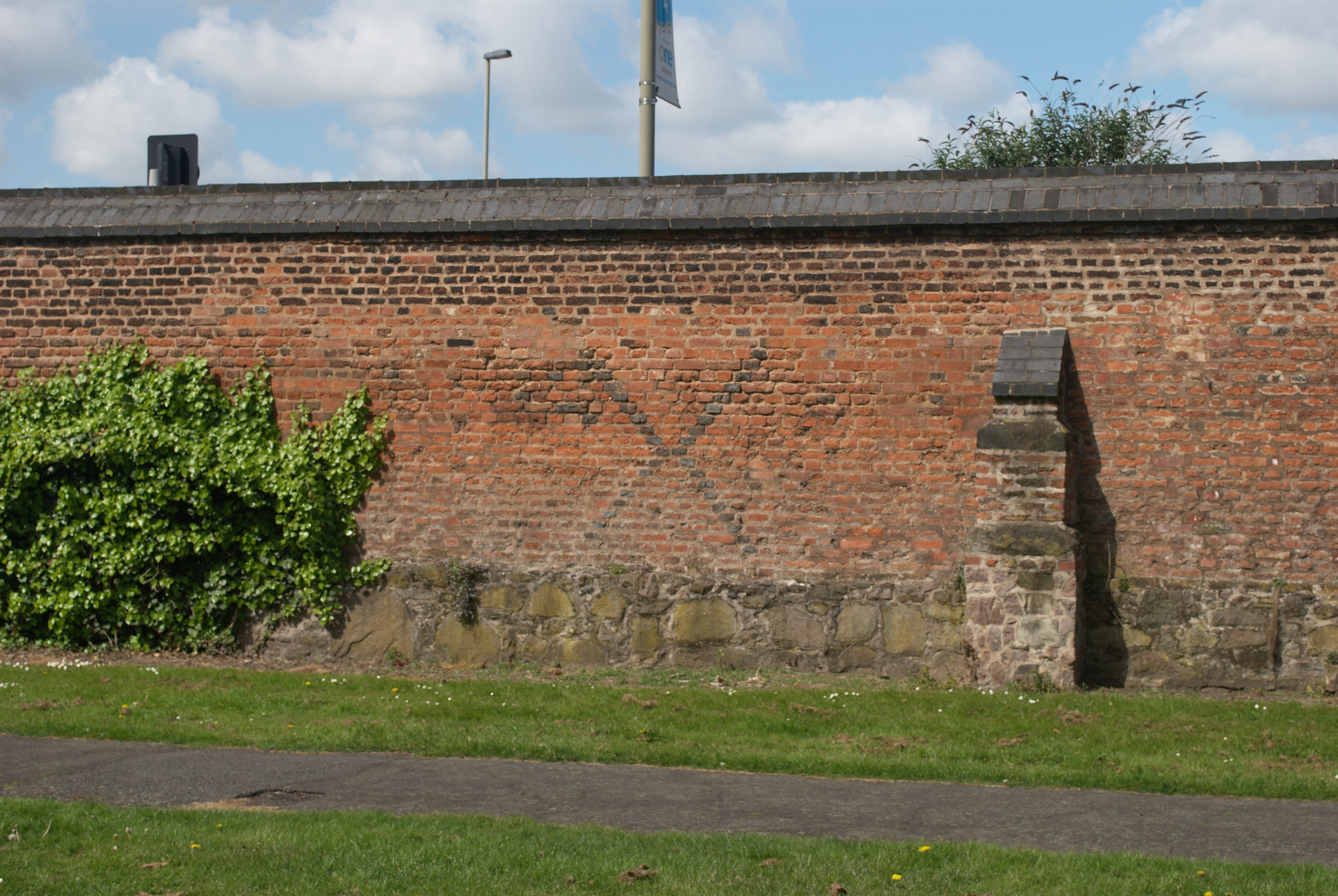
Abbot Penny's Wall at Leicester Abbey

His education is uncertain, though he may have been educated at Lincoln College, Oxford, and later received his LLD from the University of Cambridge. He is first recorded as a canon of Leicester Abbey in 1477. From 1496–1509 he was Abbot of Leicester and in around 1500 built the boundary wall, Abbot Penny's Wall, which is now named after him.

In 1520, Penny died at Leicester Abbey, where he had earlier been the abbot, and was buried at St Margaret's Church in Leicester. The church contains his alabaster effigy, although the rest of the tomb was replaced in 1846.

Catholic Church titles
Preceded by Thomas Pigot	Bishop of Bangor; 1504–1508	Succeeded by Thomas Skevington
Preceded by Roger Leyburn	Bishop of Carlisle; 1508–1520	Succeeded by John Kite
Preceded by Gilbert Manchestre	Abbot of Leicester; 1496–1509	Succeeded by Richard Pescall
