= Edward Hake =

Member of the Parliament of England

Edward Hake (fl. 1579), English satirist, was educated by John Hopkins, the part-author of the metrical version of the Psalms.

== Biography ==
He lived at Gray's Inn and Barnard's Inn, London. In the address To the Gentle Reader prefixed to his Newes out of Powles Churchyard ... Otherwise entitled Syr Nummus (2nd edition, 1579) he speaks of "the first three yeeres which I spent in the Innes of Chancery, being now about a dosen of yeeres passed." In 1585 and 1586 he was mayor of New Windsor, and in 1588 he represented Windsor in parliament.

He was protected by the earl of Leicester, whose policy it was to back the Puritan party, and who no doubt found a valuable ally in so vigorous a satirist of error in clerical places as was Hake. Hake's last work was published in 1604.

== Works ==
Newes out of Paules Churchyarde, A Trappe for Syr Monye, first appeared in 1567, but no copy of this impression is known, and it was re-issued in 1579 with the name given above. The book takes the form of a dialogue between Bertulph and Paul, who meet in the aisles of the cathedral, and is divided into eight satyrs, dealing with the corruption of the higher clergy and of judges, the greed of attorneys, the tricks of physicians and apothecaries, the sumptuary laws, extravagant living, Sunday sports, the abuse of St Paul's Cathedral as a meeting-place for business and conversation, usury, and so on. It is written in rhymed fourteen-syllable metre, which is often more comic than the writer meant. It contains, amid much prefatory matter, a "note to the carping and scornefull Sicophant," in which he attacks his foes with small courtesy and much alliteration. One is described as a "carping careless cankerd churle."

=== Other works ===
- A translation from Thomas à Kempis, The Imitation, or Following of Christ (1567, 1568)
- A Touchstone for this Time Present (1574), a scurrilous attack on the Roman Catholic Church, followed by a treatise on education
- A Commemoration of the Raigne of Elizabeth (1575), enlarged in 1578 to A Joyfull Continuance of the Commemoration, etc.
- Of Golds Kingdom, and this Unhelping Age (1604), a collection of pieces in prose and verse, in which the author inveighs against the power of gold
- Epieikeia: A Dialogue on Equity in Three Parts

A bibliography of these and of Hake's other works was compiled by Charles Edmonds for his edition in 1872 of the Newes (Isham Reprints, No. 2, 1872).
