= Victoria Park, Leicester =

Public park in Leicester

Coordinates: 52.622°N 1.120°W

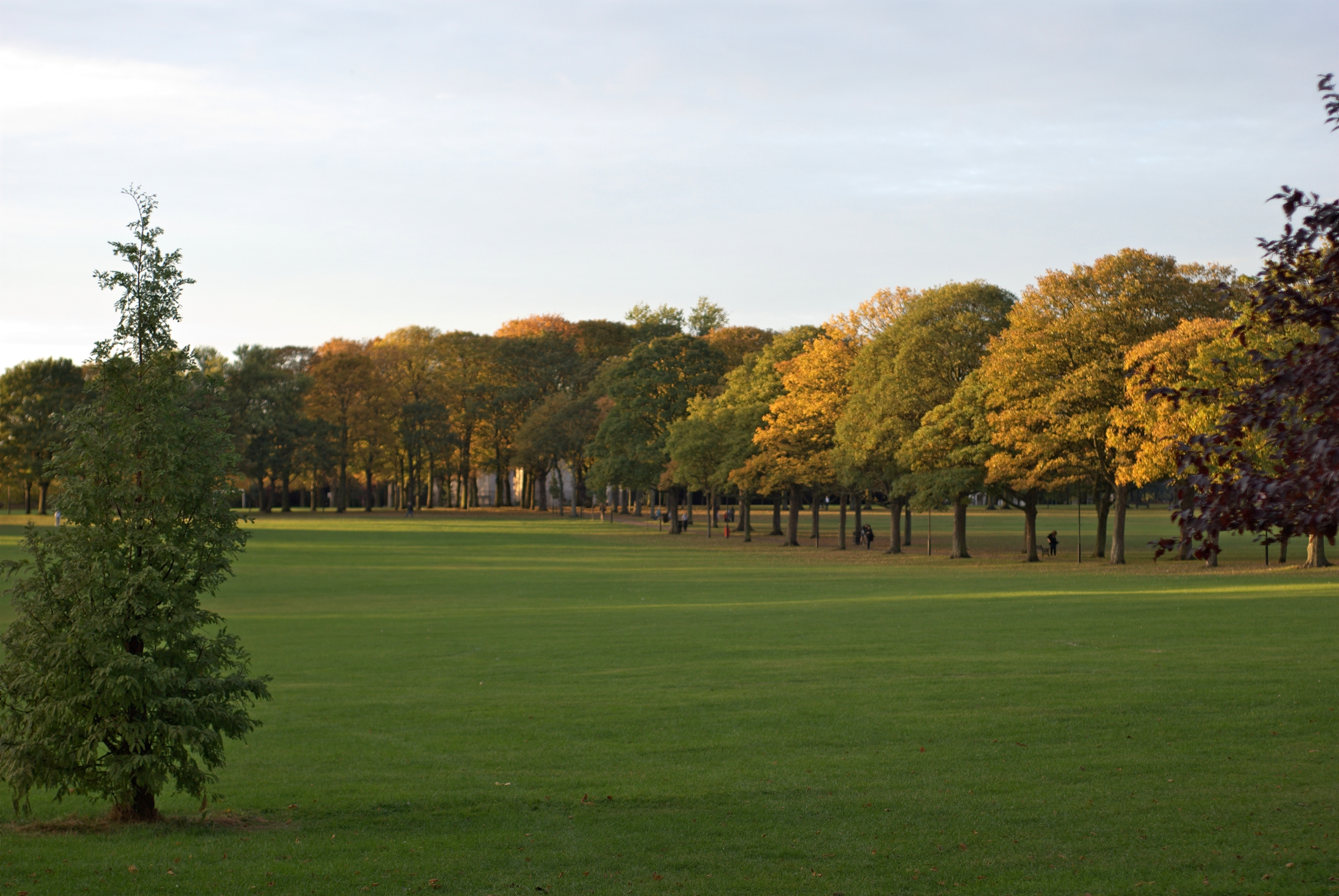
Victoria Park, Leicester.

Victoria Park in Leicester, England is a public park of 69 acres (28 ha). It is to the south-east, just outside the city centre, backing on to the University of Leicester and close to Leicester railway station.

== History ==
The park was historically part of the South Fields of Leicester, and was used from 1806 to 1883 as a racecourse – a function that was then transferred to the purpose-built Leicester Racecourse in Oadby. It was opened as a park in 1882. A Victorian grandstand stood in the park until the mid-20th century, and was used as a pavilion after racing moved to Oadby. It was damaged by a German parachute bomb in 1940 and later demolished, with the new pavilion built on the same site and opened in 1958. Leicester Fosse (who later became Leicester City Football Club) played here on various occasions between 1884 and 1890.

== Facilities ==
It has facilities for various sports, including tennis, basketball, bowls, croquet, football, cricket and rugby. A skate park has recently been added, and there is an adventure playground for young children. The majority of the park is level, open grassland and the largest space in particular is sometimes used as a venue for outdoor events – in recent years these have included BBC Radio 1's One Big Sunday, the Leicester Caribbean Carnival, Leicester Pride and the Summer Sundae music festival, and BBC Radio 2 in the Park. Kasabian also had a sell out concert here with 50,000 tickets sold. A pavilion provides sports changing facilities, and is also the site of a cafe.

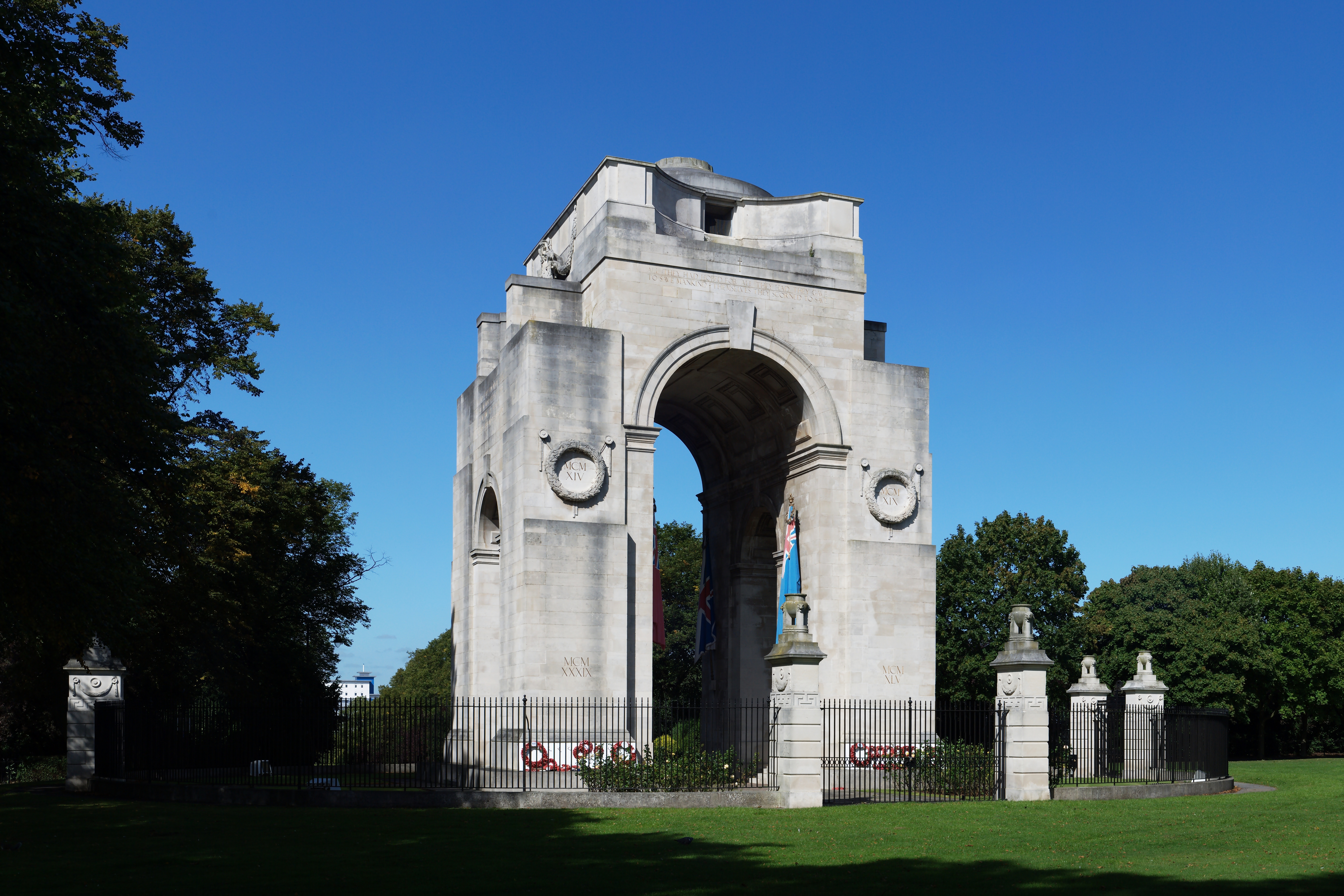
Lutyens's Arch of Remembrance war memorial in Victoria Park, Leicester

== Landmarks ==
The park is home to two memorials. The Arch of Remembrance, a quadrifrons arch, was designed by Edwin Lutyens and built in 1923, to commemorate the dead of the First World War. The memorial, a Grade I listed building, stands at the top of an ornamental walkway ("Peace Walk") with gates (also by Lutyens) opening on to University Road. A smaller memorial near the cafe commemorates the American 82nd Airborne Division, stationed in Leicester prior to D-Day. The gates and lodges on the London Road side of the park were also designed by Lutyens and built in 1930.

== Sport ==
A parkrun takes place in the park every Saturday morning at 9am.
