= Abbot Penny's Wall =

Grade I listed structure in Leicester, England

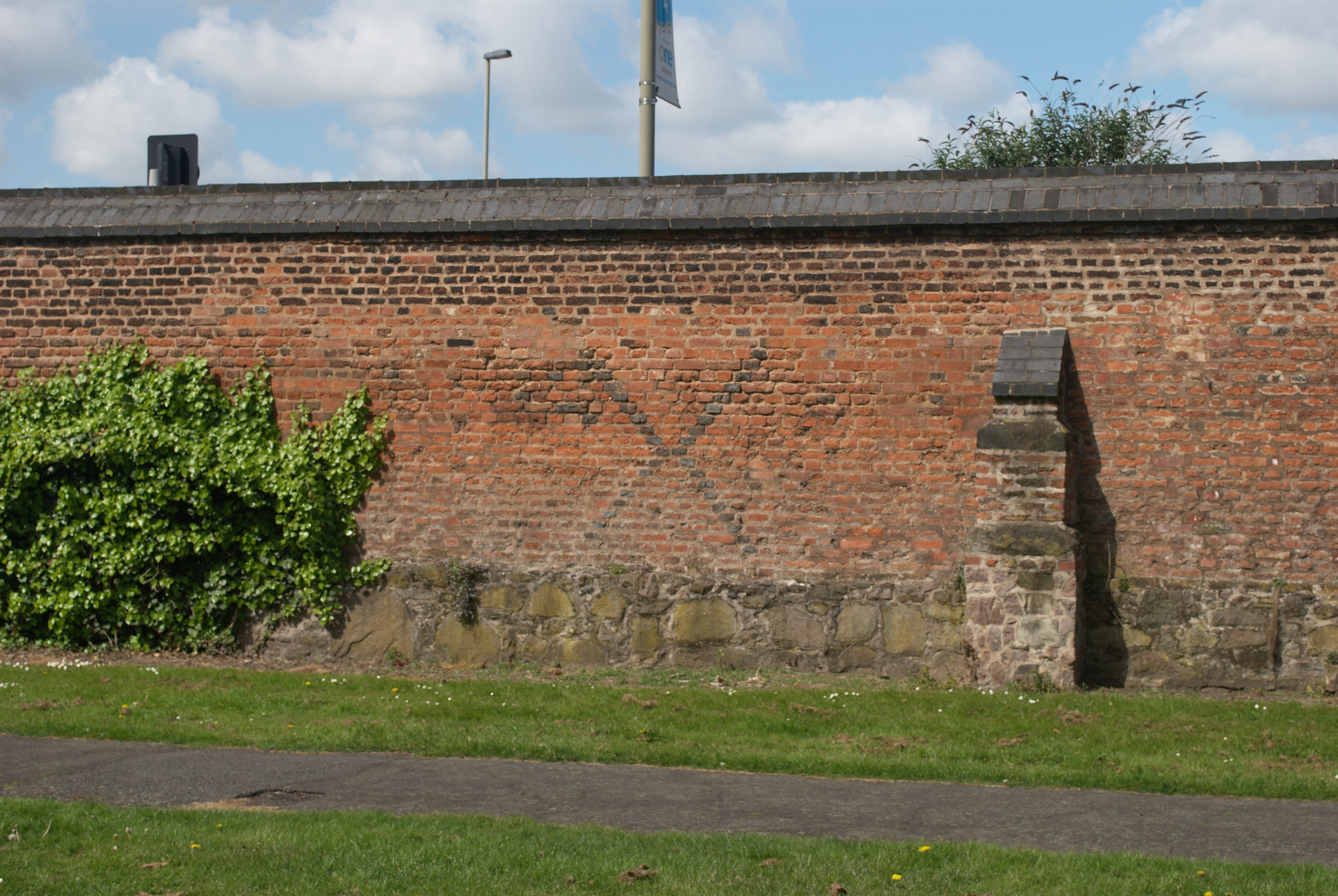

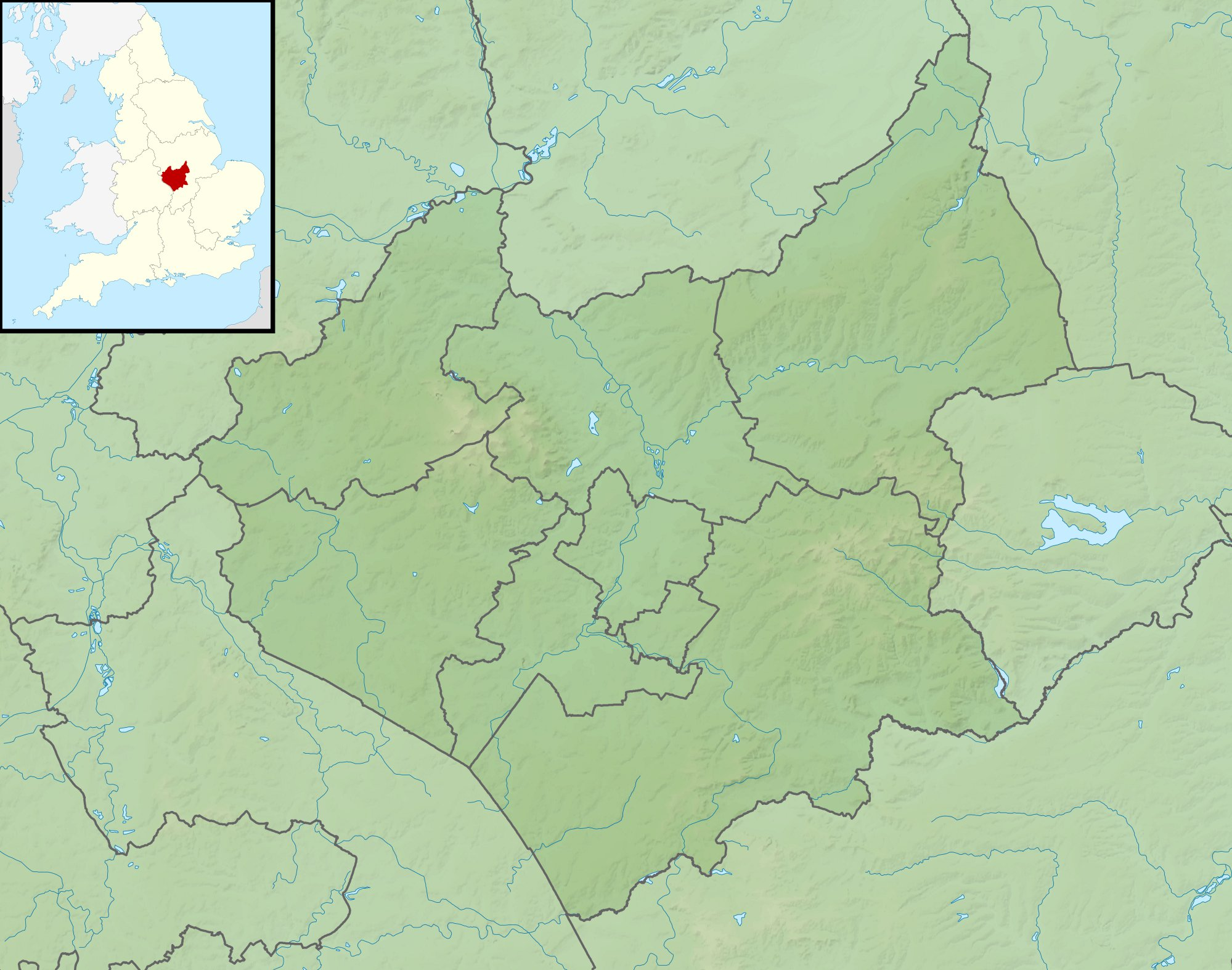
- Location within Leicestershire
- 52.6496°N 1.1365°W
- Type: Wall
- Location: Abbey Park, Leicester, England

History
- Built: c.1500, restorations in 19th, 20th and 21st centuries

Site notes
- Owner: Leicester City Council

Listed Building – Grade I
- Official name: Abbot Penny's Wall
- Designated: 14 March 1975
- Reference no.: 1361406

Scheduled monument
- Official name: Leicester Abbey and 17th century mansion and ornamental gardens
- Designated: 18 July 1995
- Reference no.: 1012149

Abbot Penny's Wall is a monastic boundary wall which once partially enclosed the grounds of Leicester Abbey. It stands in Abbey Park to the west of the City of Leicester, England. The wall was built around 1500 by John Penny, Abbot of Leicester from 1496 to 1509. It is a rare example of medieval English brickwork. Restored in the 19th, 20th and 21st centuries, the wall is now in the care of Leicester City Council and is a Grade I listed structure and a scheduled monument.

== History ==
Leicester Abbey was an abbey of the Augustinian order established in 1143. Founded by Robert de Beaumont, 2nd Earl of Leicester, it became one of the wealthiest and most powerful monastic houses of the Order. In 1496 John Penny became abbot, while also holding office as Bishop of Bangor, and subsequently Bishop of Carlisle. In around 1500, Penny ordered construction of a long boundary wall to the north and west of the abbey, which subsequently became known as Abbot Penny's Wall. The attribution to Penny arises from the initials J.P., which appear in blue brick in the wall, and to John Leland, who published a record of his visit in about 1540, noting that; "This Peny made the new bricke worke in Leicester Abbay, and much of the bricke waulles". (Note: Nikolaus Pevsner and Elizabeth Williamson, in the 2003 revised edition Leicestershire and Rutland of the Pevsner Buildings of England series, record the wall as “Boundary Wall” without referencing John Penny. Their description reads “a long stretch of red brick diapered in blue”.)

Following the Dissolution of the Monasteries the abbey was demolished in around 1538.

The wall was restored in the 19th and 20th centuries. By the 21st century it was again in disrepair, and sections were threatened with collapse due to undermining from the roots of nearby trees. A survey in 2018 was followed by extensive renovations in 2020–2021. The restoration cost £540,000.

== Architecture and description ==
Abbot Penny's Wall is one of the best remaining examples of Medieval English diapered brickwork. Alan McWhirr, in his study of Leicestershire brick buildings, considers the wall has “some of the most elaborate diaper patterned brickwork to be found in Britain”. The use of brick in Britain dates from the time of the Roman Imperium. Following the Roman evacuation in the 4th century, brick building declined. The Medieval period saw a resurgence in its use as a prestige construction material. Notable examples in Leicestershire include the south towers of Ashby-de-la-Zouch Castle and Kirby Muxloe Castle. Abbot Penny's Wall is built of red and blue brick with Charnwood granite. In addition to John Penny’s initials, J.P., the wall contains a number of patterns picked out in blue brick. These include crosses, a chalice, various “abstract designs” and the monogram IHC. It is a Grade I listed structure and a scheduled monument.

== Sources ==
- McWhirr, Alan (1997). Brickmaking in Leicestershire before 1700 (PDF). Leicester, UK: Leicestershire Archaeological and Historical Society.
- Pevsner, Nikolaus; Williamson, Elizabeth (2003). Leicestershire and Rutland. Buildings of England. New Haven, US and London: Yale University Press. ISBN 9780300096187. OCLC 49298894.
