= Richard Bull (MP) =

English landowner and politician (1721–1805)

Richard Bull (1721–1805) was an English landowner and politician who sat in the House of Commons from 1756 to 1780. He was a noted art collector who lived in a historic house on the Isle of Wight.

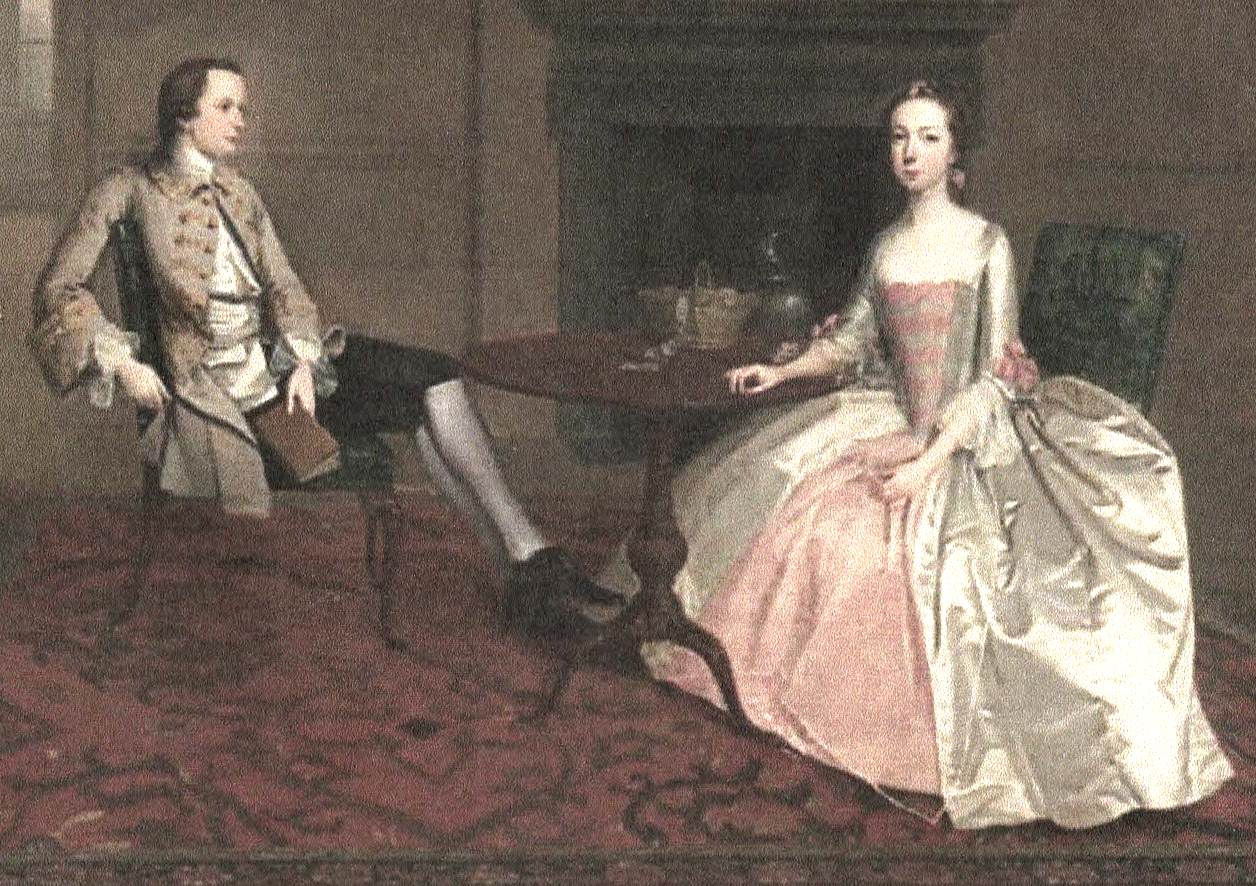
Richard Bull and his wife Mary (née Bennett), oil on canvas (detail), by Arthur Devis, c. 1747. Conservation Center, Institute of Fine Arts, New York University, Cc91.70

== Origins ==
Baptised on 15 November 1721 in the church of St Peter le Poer in the City of London, he was the only surviving son of a wealthy businessman Sir John Bull and his second wife Elizabeth Turner, His aunt Elizabeth Bull, wife of Lieutenant-General William Tatton, was the mother of Katharine Tatton, who married Edward Nevill, 15th Baron Bergavenny, and William Nevill, 16th Baron Bergavenny. His younger sister Kitty Bull (1732–1805) married the Reverend Charles Smith, brother of William Smith, Treasurer of the Ordnance.

== Life ==
Admitted to Westminster School in 1735, he started legal training at Lincoln's Inn in 1742 but this was cut short by the death of his father, when he inherited the family home of The White House at Chipping Ongar and land on the Isle of Wight. Instead he entered Trinity Hall, Cambridge in 1743, where he received a classical education, and then in 1747 he married a widow with two children for whom he took responsibility. She was Mary Ash, born 1719 in Ongar, who had been married to Bennet Alexander Bennet, her two children being Richard Henry Alexander Bennet and Levina Bennet, who in 1762 married John Luther, Together they had two daughters, Elizabeth and Catherine, who did not marry.

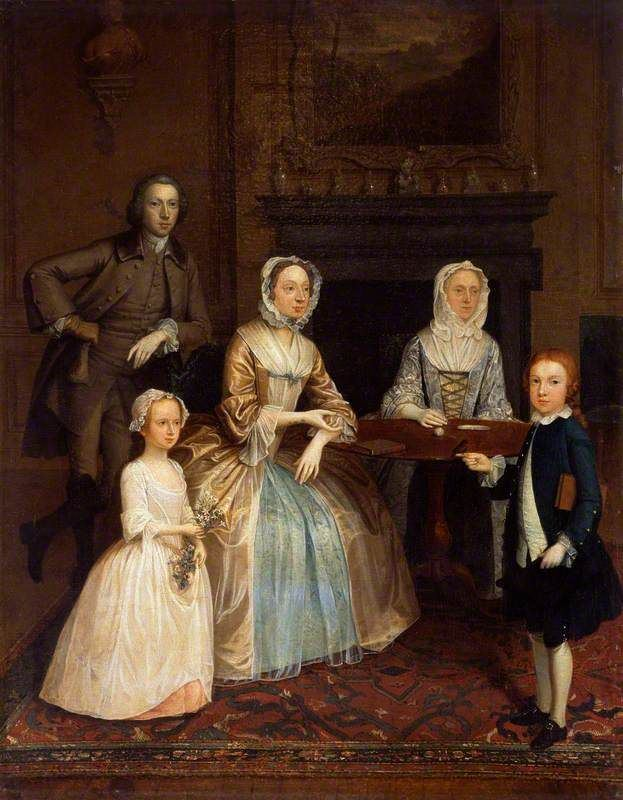

From 1755 to 1774 he had a London house at 24 Upper Brook Street and thereafter at 10 Stratton Street. In 1783 he took to staying at the mansion of Northcourt Manor at Shorwell on the Isle of Wight, from where his grandfather originated. When his daughter Catherine died in 1795 he bought Northcourt and he and Elizabeth moved there, over the years improving the house, gardens and grounds. Having no son, he endowed his nephew Charles Hewitt Smith (1773–1835) with a large sum, but it was all spent. He died intestate on 12 December 1805, with Elizabeth his heir. When she died in 1809, Northcourt and its contents went to her half-brother Richard and half-sister Levina.

== Political career ==
Through his friend Humphry Morice, in 1756 he was returned unopposed as one of the two MPs for the constituency of Newport, Cornwall, a notorious rotten borough, and held his seat until 1780. Through the Duke of Newcastle he pressed the prime minister Lord Bute for an office in 1761, but was instead granted an annual income of 600 pounds, worth about 83,000 pounds in 2014, out of the Secret Service budget. For the rest of his time in the House of Commons, receiving this retainer each year, he never voted against the government and there is no record of him addressing the assembly. From 1770 to 1774, the other member for his seat was his stepson.

== Art collection ==
A keen collector of prints, drawings and books, one of his major interests was extra-illustration. This is the practice of inserting acquired illustrations, in particular engravings, into an existing book.

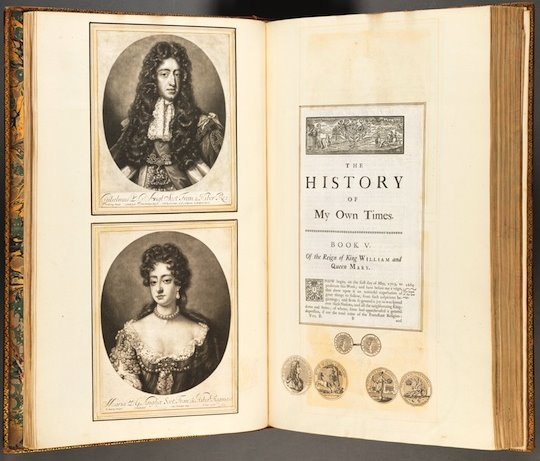
Extra-illustration by Richard Bull

Bull extra-illustrated nearly seventy works, including a copy of James Granger's Biographical History of England which he expanded physically and chronologically to thirty-five large folio volumes. Much of the physical work of cutting out and pasting down seems to have been done by his daughters. Bull's extra illustrated Granger is now in the Huntington Library in California. Among the first extra-illustrated books, and certainly the first extra-illustrated Biographical History, Bull's copy is unique in that it is documented by a long series of letters between himself and James Granger. Preserved in Eaton College, the letters tell of Bull's growing knowledge of prints, the history of Britain, and the nature of the print trade in the eighteenth century. Demand for prints to use in extra-illustration drove up prices, for which his friend Horace Walpole blamed him. In fact, his diligent search for and collecting of prints preserved many that would otherwise have been lost.

His library housed about five hundred illustrated volumes, mainly topographical, with about two hundred books printed before 1700 and a few engraved throughout. Both Horace Walpole and Anthony Morris Storer bequeathed books to him, which he had bound in red Morocco of simple design and placed in the library he had fitted in Northcourt. He was a valued client of Edwards, the Halifax bookbinders, who gave his daughter a complimentary prayer book 'as a faint Expression of Gratitude for the Recommendations and other Favours'.

An obituary recorded that: 'He early evinced an enthusiasm for the arts particularly that of engraving, which with much study he cultivated into a refined knowledge almost exclusively his own ... Through the greatest part of the century this venerable man ... continued his favourite pursuit and ... has erected for himself a monument of taste'. His collection was auctioned at Sotheby's in 1881, the sale lasting six days.

== Portraits ==
Two portraits by Arthur Devis show Richard Bull. One is a conversation piece of the newly married Richard and Mary, painted in 1747 while a later one shows the couple with her two children Richard and Levina.

Parliament of Great Britain
Preceded by Edward Bacon; John Lee	Member of Parliament for Newport, Cornwall; 1756–80; With: John Lee 1756–61; William de Grey 1761–70; Richard Henry Alexander Bennet 1770 – October 1774; Humphry Morice October 1774 – December 1774; John Frederick December 1774 – 1780	Succeeded by Viscount Maitland; John Coghill
