= William Adam of Blair Adam =

Scottish advocate, barrister, politician and judge (1751–1839)

The Right Honourable William Adam of Blair Adam DL FRSE
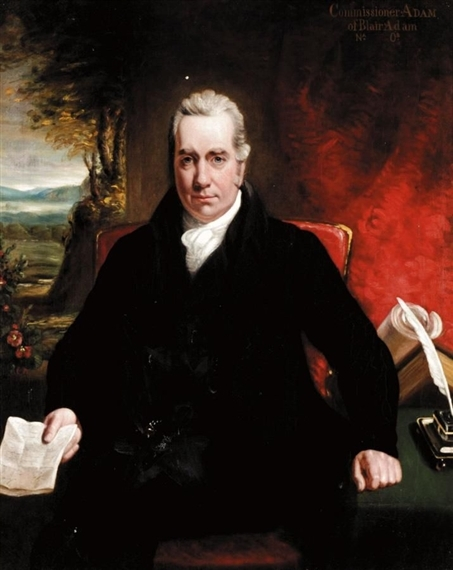
- Portrait by Sir Henry Raeburn
- Born: 2 August 1751
- Died: 17 February 1839 (aged 87)
- Spouse: Eleanora Elphinstone
- Children: 6
- Parents: John Adam; Jean Ramsay

William Adam of Blair Adam, PC, DL, FRSE (2 August 1751 – 17 February 1839) was a Scottish advocate, barrister, politician and judge. He served as Solicitor General for Scotland (1802–1805) and as Lord Chief Commissioner of the Jury Court (1815–39).

His political career was affected by his father's periodic financial problems, as sometimes the family had substantial wealth and sometimes it was in difficulties, forcing Adam to concentrate his attention on his legal practice. He rose to be Lord Lieutenant of Kinross-shire.

His most important contribution to Scottish Law was probably the introduction of trial by jury on civil (non-criminal) cases.

== Early life ==
William Adam was the only surviving son of Jean Ramsay and John Adam of Blairadam, architect and master mason to the Board of Ordnance in Scotland, of Maryburgh, Kinross. The architect Robert Adam was his uncle.

Blairadam House, where William was born, lies just north of Kelty in Fife, but on an isolated side road. He was educated at the High School in Edinburgh, then studied law at the University of Edinburgh and Christ Church, Oxford where he matriculated in 1769. He trained further at Lincoln's Inn from 1769, to qualify as an English barrister. He was admitted to the Faculty of Advocates in Scotland in 1773; and was eventually called to the English bar in 1782.

== In politics ==
Adam represented a number of constituencies in Parliament. He was MP for the rotten borough of Gatton 1774–1780. He represented Wigtown Burghs 1780–1784. He was a Treasury nominee for that seat, as a supporter of Lord North. He moved to another Scottish Burgh seat Elgin Burghs, 1784–1790.

In 1790–1794, he sat for Ross-shire. His last Parliamentary seat was Kincardineshire, which he represented from 1806 until he became a Judge in January 1812.

Adam took a very hard line on American issues in the early part of his political career. He was critical of his future political leader Lord North for being too conciliatory before the outbreak of fighting. However, after pursuing an independent course up to 25 November 1779, he then announced in the House of Commons that he was now going to support Lord North. After that he became a loyal friend and defender of North.

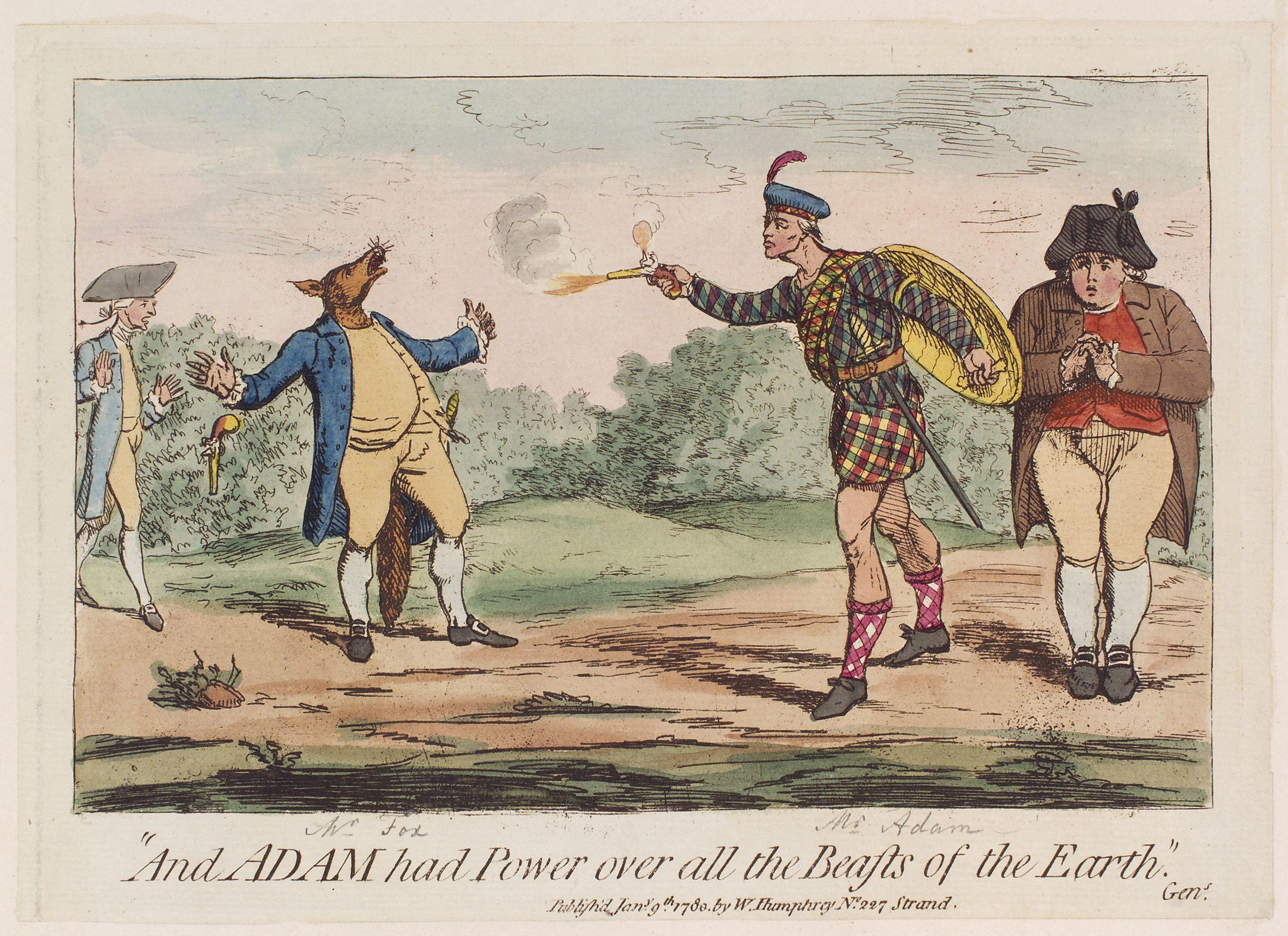
Caricature of William Adam, by James Gillray, depicting his duel with Charles James Fox

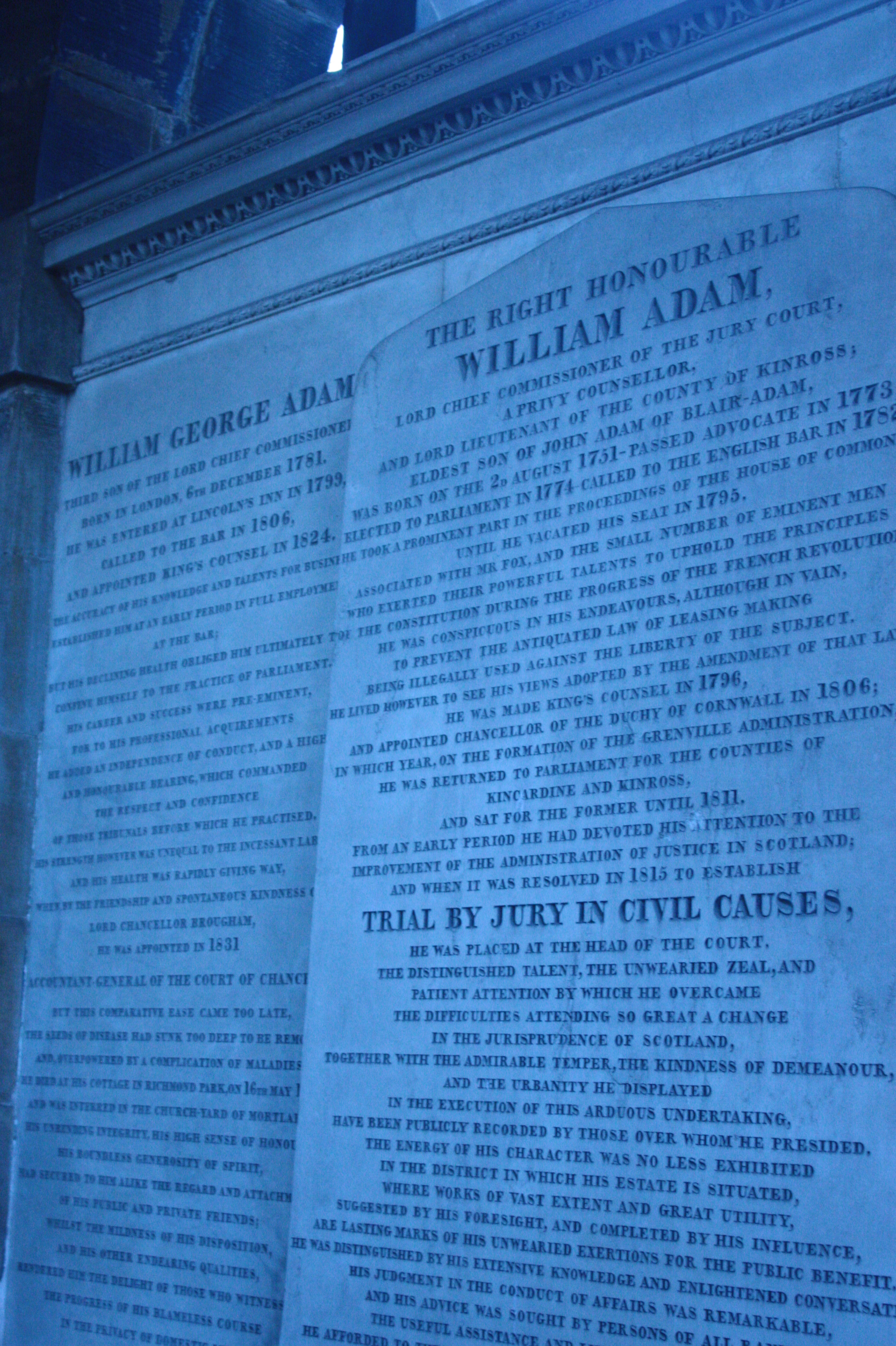
The grave of William Adam (1751–1839), Greyfriars Kirkyard

Adam particularly disliked the leading opposition figure Charles James Fox. At one stage they fought a duel. He also attacked Fox verbally in Parliament.

Adam was appointed to the minor political office of Treasurer of the Ordnance. He held this office twice, first between September 1780 and May 1782 and again April–December 1783.

On 17–18 February 1783, Adam spoke and voted against peace with the United States. After that, despite his past animosity to Charles James Fox, Adam advocated the Fox-North Coalition, as the only way to stop Lord North's party becoming politically irrelevant. Adam was active in gathering detailed information about the Scottish constituencies, to help his political associates.

== In office ==
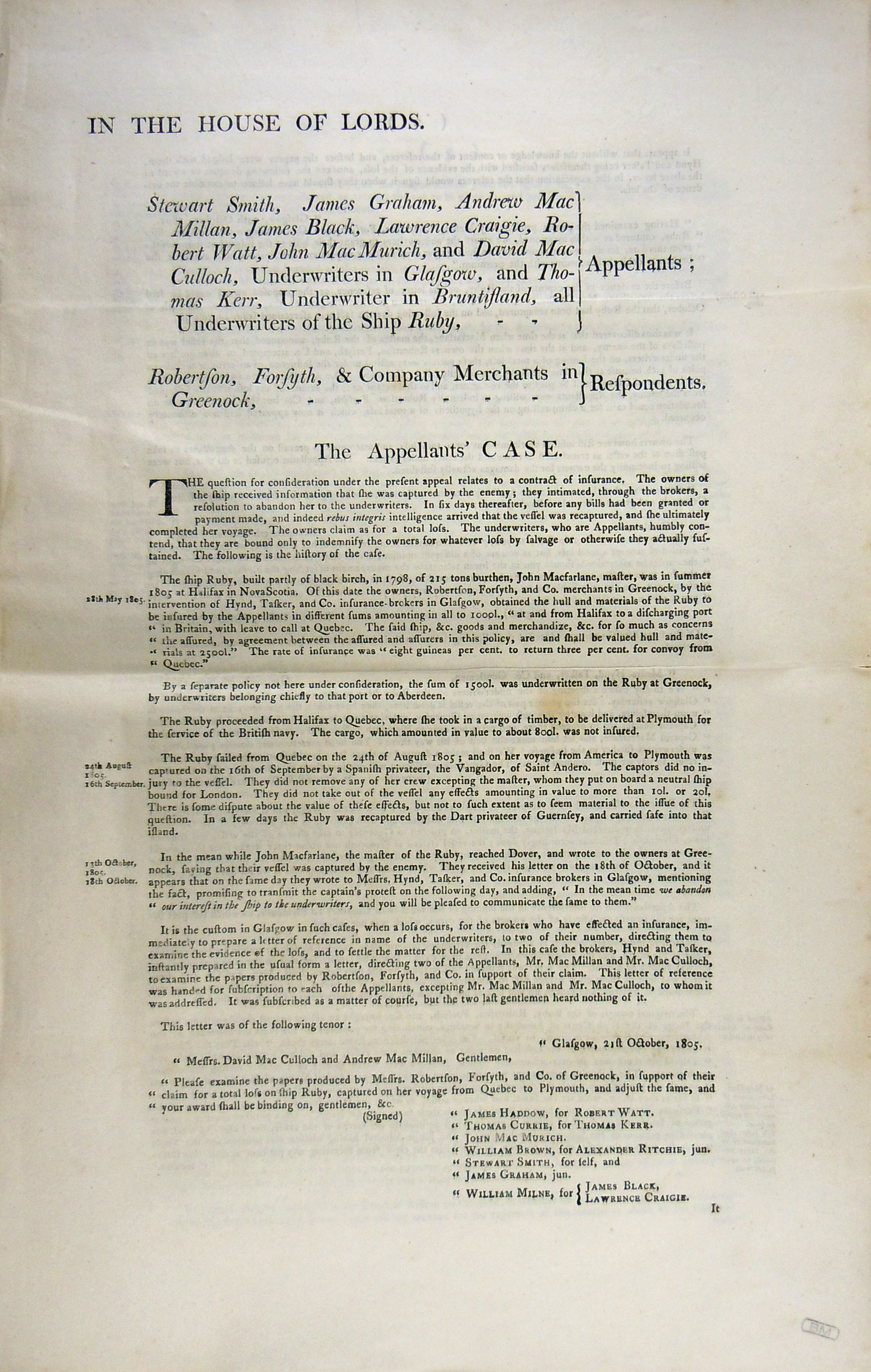
The appellants' case by William Adam, 1812

Thereafter, Adam was less involved in politics as he developed his career at the English bar. Through his friendship with the Prince of Wales he was appointed Solicitor General for Scotland (1802–1805) and then Attorney General to the Prince (1805–1806). From 1806 to 1815 he was Chancellor of the Duchy of Cornwall, another office in the gift of the Prince.

Adam was Lord Lieutenant of Kinross-shire from 1802 until his death. He became a friend of Sir Walter Scott. In 1812, he published Vitruvius Scoticus, a collection of his grandfather William Adam's architectural projects, which the elder William had first initiated in 1727.

During the Regency of the Prince of Wales, Adam received judicial office in Scotland. Between 1814 and 1819 he was a Baron of the Scottish Court of Exchequer. Adam became a member of the Privy Council on 17 March 1815. He became Lord Chief Commissioner of the Scottish jury court from 1815 until his death.

== Later life ==
In 1832–33, Adam's home address was 31 Charlotte Square in Edinburgh.

Adam died in Edinburgh on 17 February 1839, and was buried at Greyfriars Kirkyard He lies in the huge family vault built for his grandfather, William Adam the architect, facing his father, John Adam. The vault lies south-west of the church, in front of the Covenanters Prison.

== Family ==
On 7 May 1777, William Adam married Eleanora Elphinstone (died 4 February 1800), daughter of Charles, 10th Lord Elphinstone. They had six children:

1. John (4 May 1779 – 4 June 1825), civil servant of the East India Company, served as acting Governor-General of India in 1823.
2. Charles (6 October 1780 – 16 September 1853), Admiral in the Royal Navy, MP,
3. William George KC (6 December 1781 – 16 May 1839), lawyer, Accountant-General of the Court of Chancery.
4. Frederick (17 June 1784 – 17 August 1853), General in the British Army, Governor of Madras 1832–37.
5. Francis James (24 March 1791 – 8 June 1820) died of yellow fever at sea with Charles
6. Clementina (died 29 October 1877), married on 27 April 1807, John Anstruther-Thomson, DL, of Charleton, Fife.

== Notes ==
Parliament of Great Britain
Preceded by Sir William Mayne, Bt; Robert Scott	Member of Parliament for Gatton; 1774–1780; With: Robert Mayne	Succeeded by Robert Mayne; The Lord Newhaven
Preceded by Henry Watkin Dashwood	Member of Parliament for Wigtown Burghs; 1780–1784	Succeeded by William Dalrymple
Preceded by Staats Long Morris	Member of Parliament for Elgin Burghs; 1784–1790	Succeeded by Alexander Brodie
Preceded by Francis Mackenzie	Member of Parliament for Ross-shire; 1790–1794	Succeeded by Francis Mackenzie
Parliament of the United Kingdom
Preceded by John Wishart Stuart	Member of Parliament for Kincardineshire; 1806–1812	Succeeded by George Harley Drummond
Political offices
Preceded by Thomas Manners-Sutton	Solicitor-General of the Duchy of Cornwall; 1802–1805	Succeeded by Joseph Jekyll
Preceded by Vicary Gibbs	Attorney-General of the Duchy of Cornwall; 1805–1806	Succeeded by William Garrow
Preceded by Thomas Erskine	Chancellor of the Duchy of Cornwall; 1806–1815	Succeeded by John Leach
Military offices
Preceded by John Ross Mackye	Treasurer of the Ordnance; 1780–1782	Succeeded by William Smith
Preceded by William Smith	Treasurer of the Ordnance; 1783	Succeeded by William Smith
Honorary titles
Preceded by George Graham	Lord Lieutenant of Kinross-shire; 1802–1839	Succeeded by Sir Charles Adam
