= Charles Webber (Royal Navy officer) =

British admiral

Charles Webber (1722-1783), Rear-Admiral of the White, was a British naval commander who participated in the Battle of Toulon in 1744, the Capture of Quebec in 1759 and the Capture of Havana in 1762.

== Origins ==
Born on 29 August 1722 and baptised at St James Piccadilly on 11 September 1722, he was the second son of Robert Webber and his wife Mary. His father was an illegitimate son of Charles Lennox, 1st Duke of Richmond (himself an illegitimate son of King Charles II of England) and one of his godfathers was his uncle Charles Lennox, 2nd Duke of Richmond. His younger brother was the Reverend William Webber (1724-1790) who became a canon residentiary of Chichester Cathedral and chaplain to their cousin Charles Lennox, 3rd Duke of Richmond.

== Career ==
At age 21 in January 1744, he was appointed by Admiral Thomas Mathews as Lieutenant of the 70-gun ship of the line HMS Elizabeth and was immediately involved in the battle with the French and Spanish fleets off Toulon on 11 February 1744. In April 1756 he was promoted to Captain of the 20-gun frigate HMS Rose, followed in May 1758 by command of the 28-gun frigate HMS Cerberus.

It was Cerberus that carried General James Wolfe across the Atlantic to command the British forces which on 13 September 1759 captured the French city of Quebec and, after he died there of his wounds, carried his body back to England. With Canada secured, ships and soldiers were sent to the Caribbean where, in June 1762, Cerberus formed part of the British forces under Admiral George Pocock and his second in command, the then Commodore Augustus Keppel, which on 13 August 1762 captured the Spanish city of Havana. Keppel was confident of Webber's abilities, writing to Pocock: "I am glad you think well of Captain Webber. I believe you will find he will command the boat very well." With Cuba secured, most of the British forces dispersed and on 25 September 1762 in Cerberus he sailed for Jamaica.

After leaving Cerberus in 1762, he does not seem to have held any seagoing command. In 1767 he bought a small estate in Havant in Hampshire, which became the family home after his marriage there in 1769 but was sold after his death. In 1780 he was promoted to Rear-Admiral of the White, and on 23 May 1783 he died in Bryanston Street, Marylebone, at the age of 60. In his will he left his lands to his widow, 1,000 pounds to an illegitimate son named Thomas, the rest of his possessions to his widow and two daughters, and nothing to either surviving son.

== Family ==
On 27 July 1769 at Havant he married Anne Vining Heron (1748-1805) and she had five children:

- Anne Webber (1770-1825), who in 1793 married John Blair but had no children.
- Charles Webber (1773-1786), who died at sea unmarried.
- Robert Webber (1775-1830), who about 1804 may have married Ann Reed and had nine children.
- Susanna Webber (1777-1850), who in 1804 married William George Smith, a Quebec lawyer, and had six children.
- James Webber (1778-1853) later Lieutenant-General, who in 1807 married Eleanor Elizabeth Simeon and had eleven children.

Though the Admiral seems to have been a wealthy man at his death, his 35-year-old widow petitioned the Admiralty for a pension which, based on a Rear-Admiral's pay, was valuable. Three days after the Admiralty's decision and six months and one day after the Admiral's death, she married William Smith, deputy to the 3rd Duke of Richmond as Treasurer of the Ordnance and brother of Anne Smith (1731-1806), her late husband's sister-in-law. Her youngest child James was made William's heir, with the last name Smith added, which suggests that he was not the Admiral's biological son.
