= John Bull (businessman) =

English businessman (1672–1742)

Sir John Bull
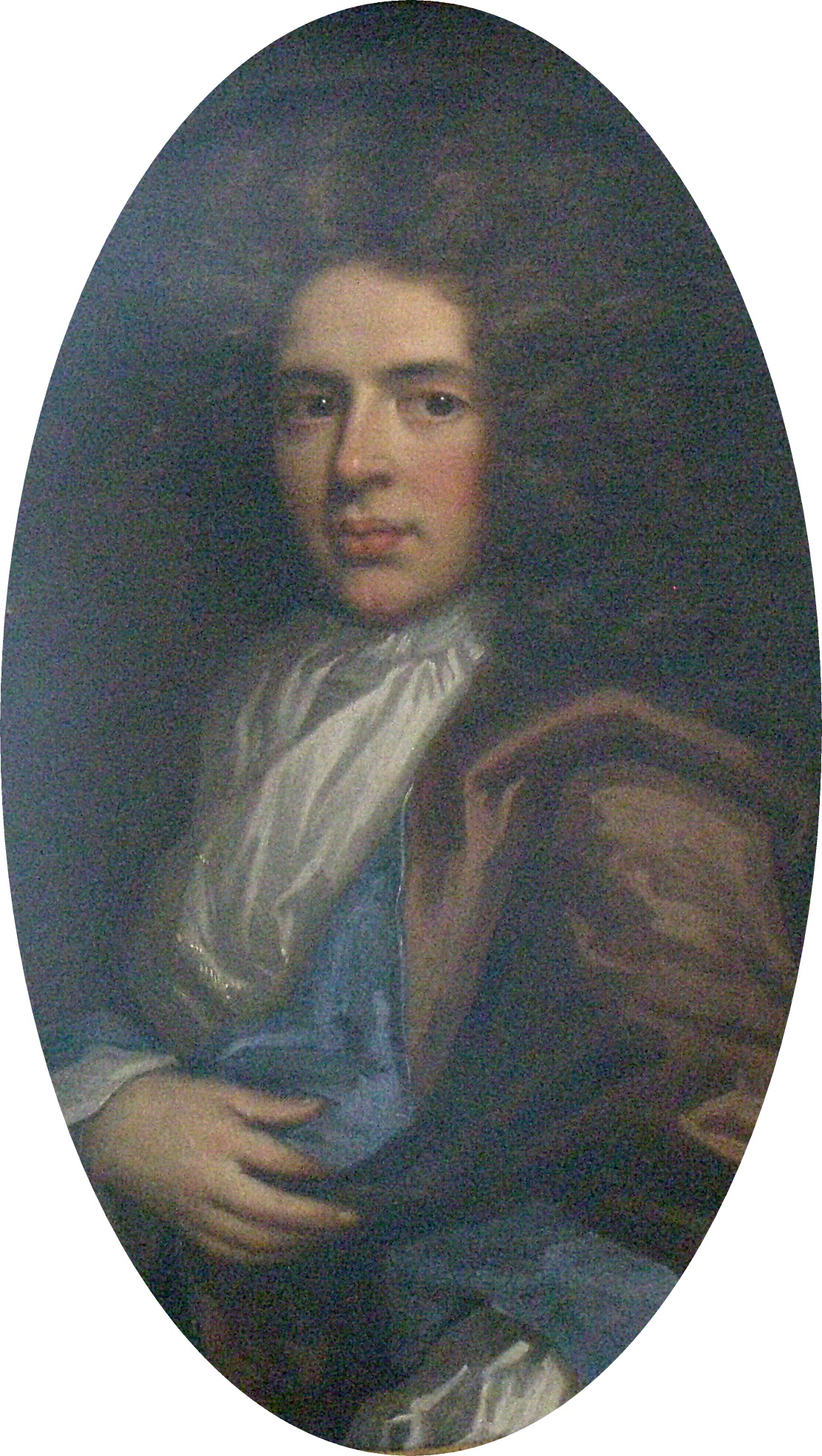

Sheriff of London
- In office 30 September 1717 – 29 September 1718

Personal details
- Born: 1672
- Died: 4 April 1742 (aged 69–70) Chipping Ongar, Essex, England
- Spouse: Elizabeth Turner (1696–1738)

Sir John Bull (1672–1742) was a prominent businessman in the City of London trading with the Levant, who served as Sheriff of London.

== Early life ==
Born about 1672, he was the youngest son of John Bull (1631–1715), a London businessman from Newport, Isle of Wight who was a shareholder in the Royal Africa Company and his wife Sarah. His elder sister Elizabeth was the first wife of Lieutenant-General William Tatton.

== Career ==
Becoming a member of the Levant Company which controlled English trade with the Venetian and Ottoman empires, he was knighted on 27 October 1717 at Hampton Court Palace by King George I and served as Sheriff of London in 1718. He died and was buried at Ongar; his will was proved in London on 10 April 1742.

== Family ==
After a brief first marriage, on 14 December 1717 in London he married Elizabeth Turner (1696–1738), daughter of Richard Turner (1653–1725), a London barrister, and his wife Elizabeth Goldsborough (1652–1737), whose family had property at Chipping Ongar in Essex. The couple moved to the White House at Ongar, where they had eleven children, although only three lived long enough to marry.

His son, Richard, was a Member of Parliament and noted art collector. Of his daughters, Dorothy married John Lenham, while Kitty (1732–1805) married the Reverend Charles Smith (1729–1803), the rector of West Stoke in Sussex, who was brother of William Smith, Treasurer of the Ordnance and uncle of both the Venerable Charles Webber, Archdeacon of Chichester, and the Reverend James Webber, Dean of Ripon.
