= Clementina Anstruther-Thomson =

Scottish author and art theorist (1857–1921)

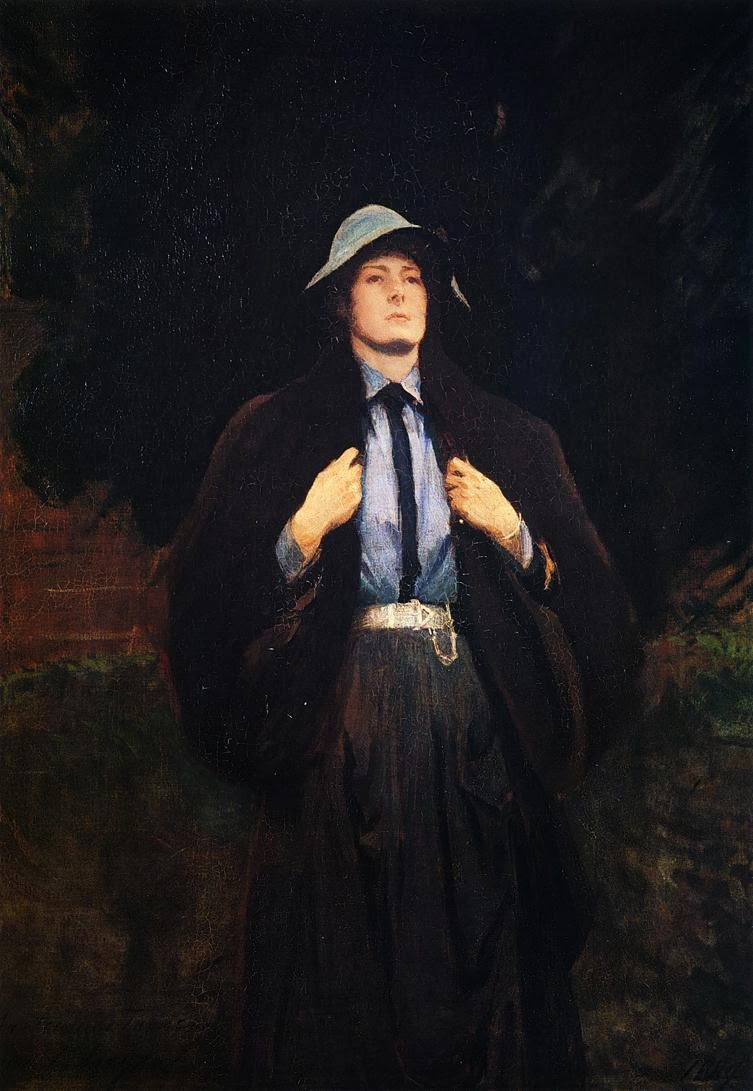
- Portrait of Clementina Anstruther-Thomson by John Singer Sargent (1889)
- Born: Clementina Caroline Anstruther-Thomson; 15 December 1857; Edinburgh, Scotland
- Died: 7 July 1921 (aged 63); Chelsea, London, England
- Occupations: Author and art theorist
- Known for: Experimental aesthetics
- Relatives: John Anstruther-Thomson (grandfather)

Clementina "Kit" Caroline Anstruther-Thomson (15 December 1857 – 7 July 1921) was a Scottish author and art theorist. She was known for writing and lecturing on experimental aesthetics during the Victorian era. Her collaboration with Vernon Lee in the 1890s inspired Lee's growing interests in the physiological aspect of aesthetics later in her career.

== Early life ==
Clementina Anstruther-Thomson was born on 15 December 1857 in Edinburgh, Scotland, to an aristocratic family, the daughter of John Anstruther-Thomson of Charleton and Carntyne, and Caroline Maria Agnes Robina Hamilton-Gray. Her grandfather, also John Anstruther-Thomson, was a career officer in the British Territorial Army.

== Experimental aesthetics ==
The aesthetic movement in the United Kingdom began in the 1860s during the Victorian period. In Victorian literature, writers of the aesthetic movement focused on the sensual aspect of aesthetics. Anstruther-Thomson in particular was keen on experiencing art physically with her body. In one of the lectures titled "What Patterns Do to Us" given by Anstruther-Thomson, she encouraged the audience to engage with a patterned vase and "feel its effect on their bodies".

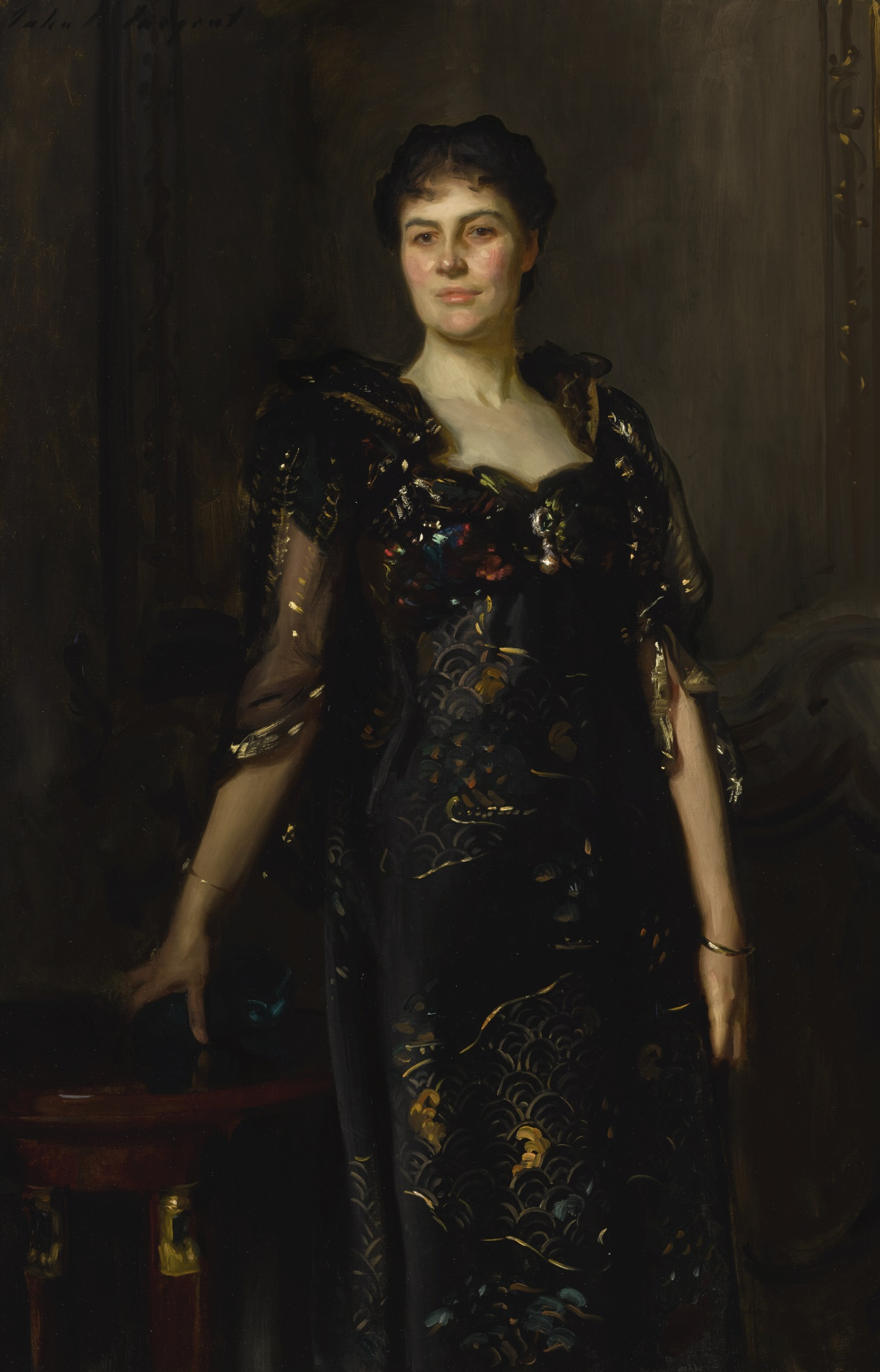
Mrs. Charles Anstruther-Thomson by John Singer Sargent

Vernon Lee was already familiar with Anstruther-Thomson's work prior to meeting her. Contemporary writers have described Anstruther-Thomson as having the physique that resembles the ideals from ancient Greek sculpture, and Lee frequently described her obsession with Anstruther-Thomson's body in her writings. When Lee observed art with Anstruther-Thomson, her aesthetic experience was based on "lesbian desire" of Anstruther-Thomson's body that embodied Greek ideals.

== Collaboration with Vernon Lee ==
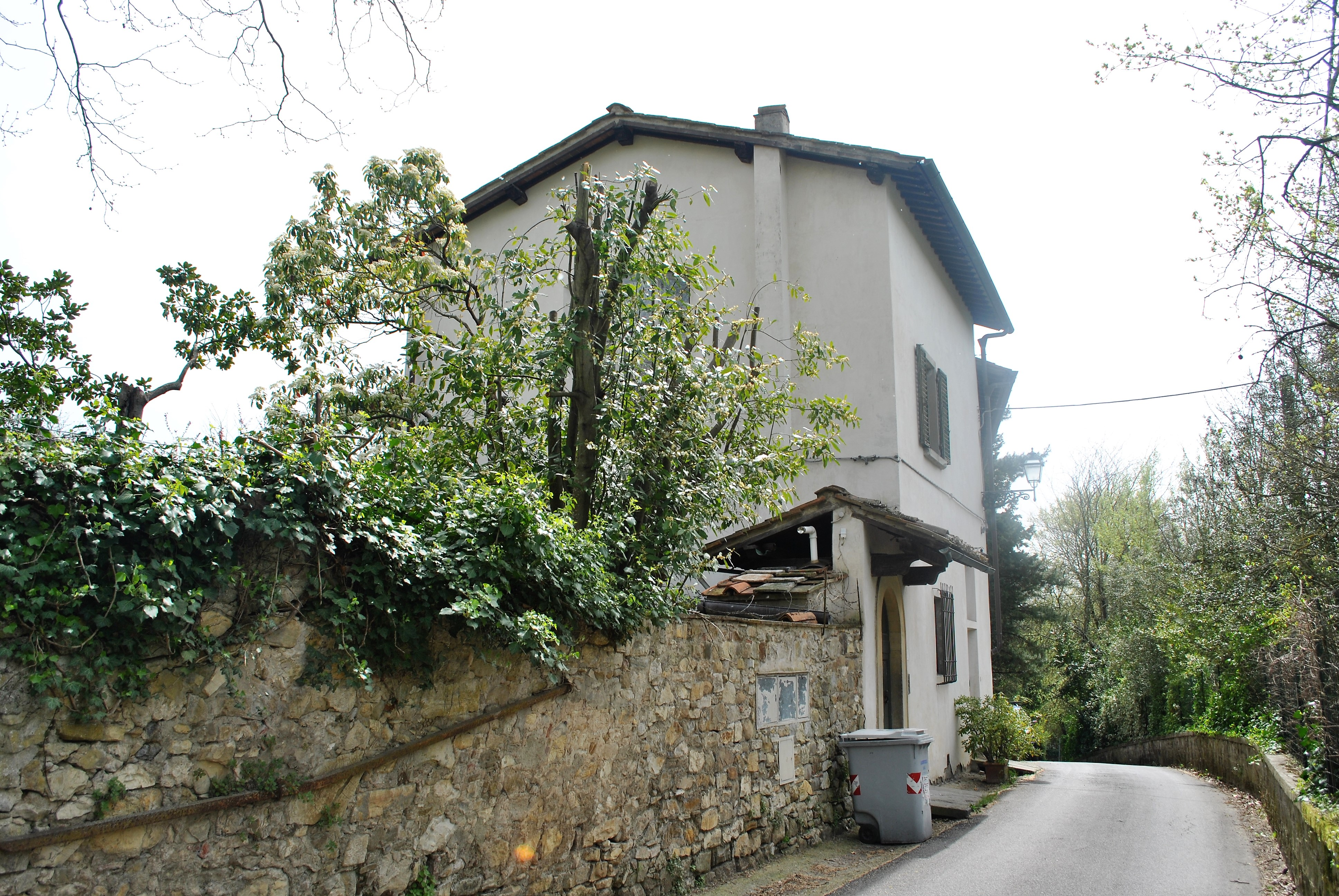
The villa in Florence, Italy, where Anstruther-Thomson and Vernon Lee lived together.

Anstruther-Thomson first met Vernon Lee in 1888, and for the next twelve years the two women openly lived together, as "lovers, friends, and co-authors". Living as expatriates in Italy, they often travelled back and forth to Britain. In their time together, they took aesthetics experiments and recorded their findings. Throughout the 1890s, Anstruther-Thomson and Lee visited many museums across continental Europe and observed many art works. In their observation, they recorded in writing on how their body responded to art works.

In 1897, they published the combined findings in the article "Beauty and Ugliness", which investigates the physiology of aesthetics. Their research was based on the James–Lange theory of how the human body responds to stimulation and triggers emotion. Many of the findings, however, were not taken seriously as both their professional and romantic relationship was "attacked" by their contemporaries, receiving "severe criticisms" from friends.

== Later life ==
After the publication of "Beauty and Ugliness", Anstruther-Thomson gradually drifted away from Lee, and eventually broke off the relationship in 1898, remaining close friends. She was subsequently in a relationship with the Welsh author and Chief Commissioner for Girl Guides in Wales, Hon. Fflorens Roch (1879–1969), during which the two were "rarely apart".

Later in her life, Anstruther-Thomson worked closely with the Girl Guides Association. Many of the leaders were single women, and some were lesbian as well, for whom Guiding provided a safe refuge. Anstruther-Thomson was both an organiser and trainer, and held the position of County Commissioner until her death, on 7 July 1921.She was buried with her family in Kilconquhar Parish Churchyard, Kilconquhar.

Her writings on aesthetics were collected and published posthumously by Lee in Art and Man in 1924, with an introduction, also by Lee, that describes their collaboration in experiencing art.

== Personal views ==
Anstruther-Thompson was a humanist and a proponent of the British Ethical movement. She was a paid-up member of the West London Ethical Society, a predecessor group of Humanists UK, which later recalled her contributions as one of its "heroines of freethought".
