= Richard Henry Alexander Bennet =

Richard Henry Alexander Bennet (sometimes spelled Bennett) may refer to one of two people:

- Richard Henry Alexander Bennet (senior) (1743–1814), British Member of Parliament for Newport, Cornwall
- Richard Henry Alexander Bennet (junior) (c. 1771–1818), son of the above, British naval captain and Member of Parliament for Launceston
