= Sir George Wharton, 1st Baronet =

English army officer, astrologer and poet (1617-1681)

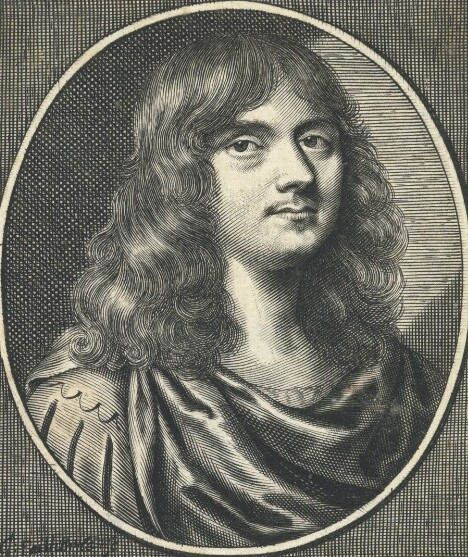
Engraving of Wharton

Sir George Wharton, 1st Baronet (4 April 1617 – 12 August 1681) was an English army officer, astrologer and poet who served as the Treasurer of the Ordnance from 1670 to 1681.

== Life ==
He was the son of a blacksmith in Westmorland. He went to Oxford to study, though not admitted to the university. He then returned to Westmorland, and in 1642 sold his family property, and raised his own troop of horse for the Royalist cause. He shared defeat at Stow-on-the-Wold, in 1643. He is said to have served under Jacob Astley, 1st Baron Astley of Reading.

He then went to Charles I at Oxford, and was given a paymaster position in the Ordnance, under Sir John Heydon. At this period he became a friend of Elias Ashmole, helping him to a military commission.

Wharton attended, with Ashmole, the first meeting in 1647 of the Society of Astrologers at Gresham College. It included both William Lilly and John Booker, Parliamentarians who had been on the other side of the astrological pamphlet exchanges in the Civil War that had ended in 1646.

He was imprisoned in 1649, and might have been executed but his former opponent William Lilly spoke up for him with Bulstrode Whitelocke. He was released by the intervention of Ashmole, who made him steward on his Berkshire estates.

At the English Restoration of 1660, he was reinstated as a paymaster. He became Treasurer of the Ordnance in 1670, an office he held until his death. He was made a baronet in 1677.

== Works ==
He took the pen name George Naworth, for his first almanac in 1641. He then issued an almost unbroken annual sequence, using his own name from 1645, not publishing in 1646, but expanding the work with history and continuing from 1647 to 1666.

As a royalist pamphleteer and newsbook editor, he wrote Mercurius Elencticus from 1647. Mocking Parliament, it carried biographical material on its leaders. When Wharton was imprisoned, it continued with help from Samuel Sheppard.

He attacked John Hall, who wrote Mercurius Britanicus, employed by William Lilly whom Mercurius Elencticus lampooned. He also attacked John Booker, another astrologer in the Parliamentarian camp.

His collected works were issued by John Gadbury, in 1683.

== Notes ==
Military offices
Preceded by George Clark	Clerk of the Deliveries of the Ordnance; 1670	Succeeded by Samuel Fortrey
New office	Treasurer of the Ordnance; 1670–1681	Succeeded by Charles Bertie
Baronetage of England
New creation	Baronet (of Kirby Kendall, Westmorland); 1677–1681	Succeeded by Polycarpus Wharton
