= Edward Nevill, 15th Baron Bergavenny =

English peer (c. 1705–1724)

Edward Neville
- Baron Bergavenny
- Born: 1705
- Died: 9 October 1724 (aged 18–19)
- Noble family: House of Neville
- Spouse: Katherine Tatton
- Father: George Nevill, 13th Baron Bergavenny
- Mother: Anne Walker

Edward Nevill, de facto 15th (de jure 3rd) Baron Bergavenny (c. 1705 – 9 October 1724) was an English peer.

== Life ==
Son of George Nevill, 13th Baron Bergavenny and his wife Anne Walker, he became baron when his elder brother George Nevill, 14th Baron Bergavenny, died on 15 November 1723 without leaving children.

On 6 May 1724, he entered into a fleet marriage with Katherine Tatton, daughter of Lieutenant-General William Tatton and his wife Elizabeth Bull, sister of Sir John Bull, but he died later that year without children.

The barony passed to his cousin William Nevill, 16th Baron Bergavenny, who married his widow. As his elder sister Jane (d. 1786) was still alive, this implies that in 1724 at least the barony passed by heirs male not by heirs general.

Peerage of England
Preceded by George Nevill	Baron Bergavenny; 1720/1–1723	Succeeded by William Nevill
