= John Anstruther-Thomson =

Colonel John Anstruther-Thomson of Charleton (15 April 1776 – 10 April 1833) was a Scottish nobleman and Colonel of the Royal Fifeshire Yeomanry Cavalry.

== Family ==
Anstruther-Thomson was the son of Colonel John Anstruther and Grizel Maria Thomson of Charleton in Fife, Scotland.

He married Clementina Adam, daughter of William Adam of Blair Adam and Honorable Eleanor Elphinstone, on 27 April 1807.

== Military life ==
Joining the Royal Fifeshire Yeomanry Cavalry he took over command from Lt Colonel Morison of Naughton in 1809 and continued in command until 1823. Under his command the Regiment flourished, receiving in 1814 the thanks of both Houses of Parliament for its services.

== Name Changes ==
He was baptised with the name of John Anstruther but in 1815 his name was legally changed to John Anstruther-Thomson to inherit the Charleton Estate from his mother's family.

He succeeded to the title of 17th Lord St. Clair on 5 July 1795 but did not take this title.

== Children ==
- Eleanor Anstruther-Thomson (8 January 1878)
- Mary Elphinstone Charlotte Anstruther-Thomson (4 July 1871)

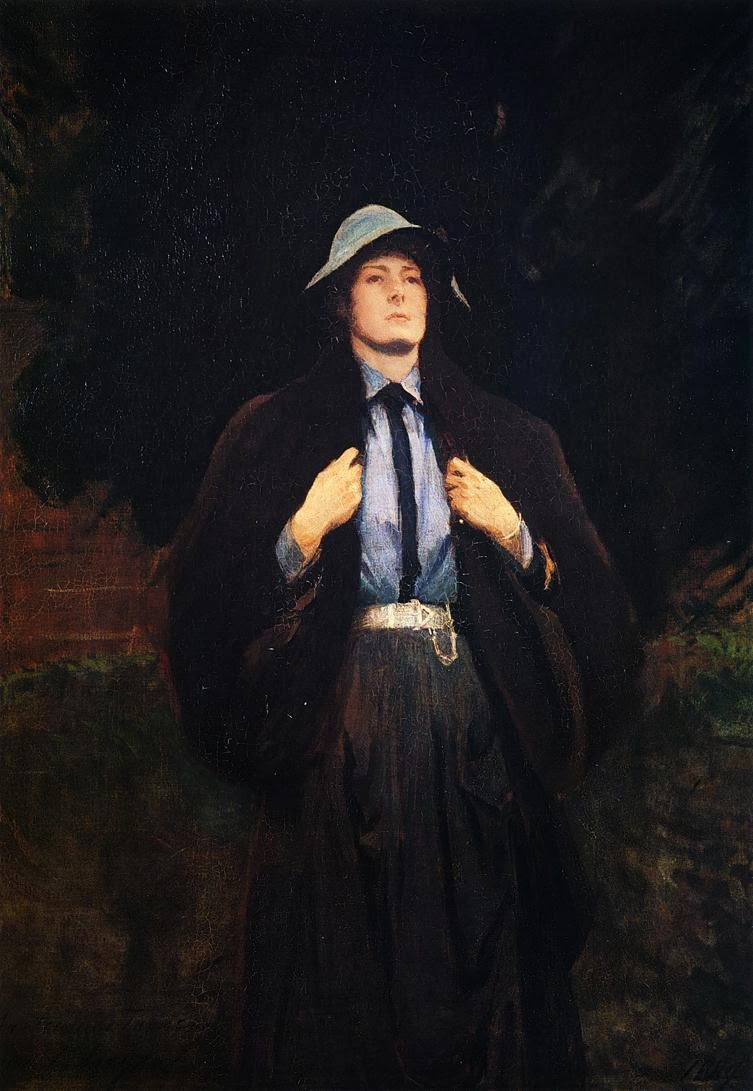
John Singer Sargent (1856–1925). Clementina Anstruther-Thomson, 1889

- John Anstruther-Thomson of Charleton and Carntyne (8 August 1818 – 8 October 1904). His daughter Clementina Anstruther-Thomson (1857–1921) was the long-time companion of writer Violet Paget a.k.a. Vernon Lee (1856–1935)
- Lt.-Col. William Adam Anstruther-Thomson (4 December 1823 – 3 August 1865)
