= Fflorens Roch =

British Girl Guide leader and author

- Born: Hon. Fflorens Mary Ursula Herbert; 12 February 1879; Westminster, London
- Died: 18 March 1969 (aged 90); Pontypool, Wales
- Other names: Seren Gwent; Mrs Walter Roch
- Education: University of Cambridge
- Spouse: Walter Francis Roch m. 1911
- Parent(s): Sir Ivor John Caradoc Herbert, 1st Baron Treowen and Albertina Agnes Mary Denison
- Family: Benjamin Hall, 1st Baron Llanover, grandfather Augusta Hall, Baroness Llanover, grandmother Peter FitzHerbert, descendent

The Hon. Fflorens Roch (12 Feb 1879 -18 March 1969) was an author and chief commissioner for Girl Guides in Wales. In 1916 she donated the Llanover Manuscripts (seventy-seven volumes of notes, transcripts and compositions by Iolo Morganwg) to the National Library of Wales. She was a recipient of the Silver Fish Award, the Girl Guide Association's highest adult honour, in 1922.

== Family and personal life ==
Born the Hon. Fflorens Mary Ursula Herbert, she was the daughter of Sir Ivor John Caradoc Herbert, 1st Baron Treowen (1851–1933) and Hon. Albertina Agnes Mary Denison (1854–1929). She had one brother, Hon. Elydir John Bernard Herbert, who was killed in World War I, at which point she inherited the family fortune. She was a descendent of Peter FitzHerbert (d. 1235), one of the counsellor's named in the Magna Carta. She was a student at Cambridge University. The family estate was Llanarth Court, Monmouthshire.

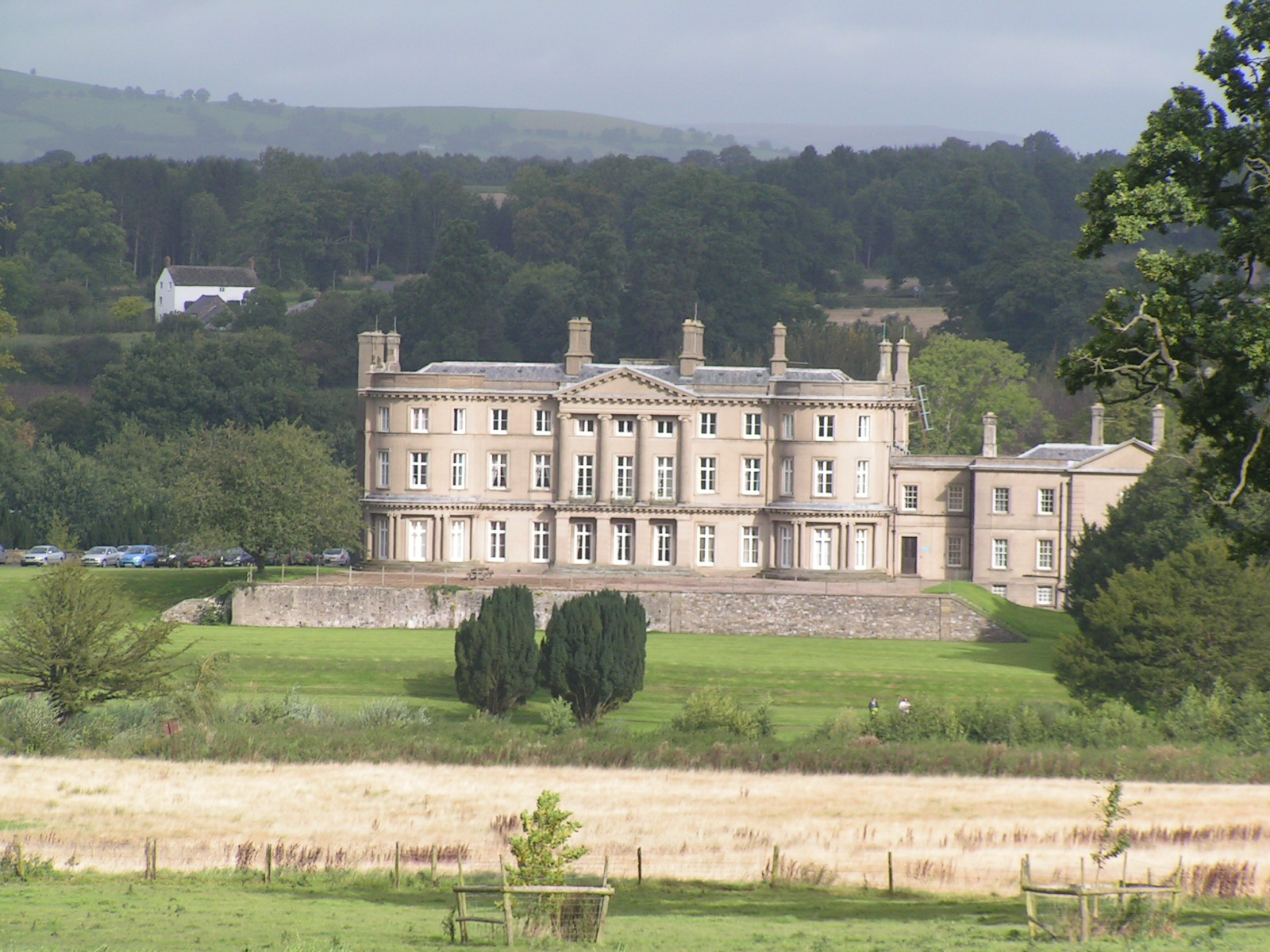
Llanarth Court, Monmouthshire

She married Walter Roch (1880–1965), the MP for Pembrokeshire on 20 April 1911. At that year's annual general meeting of the Liberal Social Council in Newport, she was presented with a bookcase containing a "valuable collection of Welsh literature" as a wedding gift.

She "lived very little with her husband and had nothing in common with him." She developed a "close and long-lasting relationship" with Scottish author and art theorist Clementina Anstruther-Thomson (1857–1921). The two were "rarely apart".

=== Catholic faith ===
Roch, like her parents, was a committed Catholic. In 1948, she donated the main house of Llanover Court to the Catholic Church, and moved into a small home on the estate. She also paid for the building of a Catholic church, Our Lady of Peace, in Newbridge, Caerphilly, published several pamphlets and books through the Catholic Truth Society including about the Catholic faith in Girl Guiding.

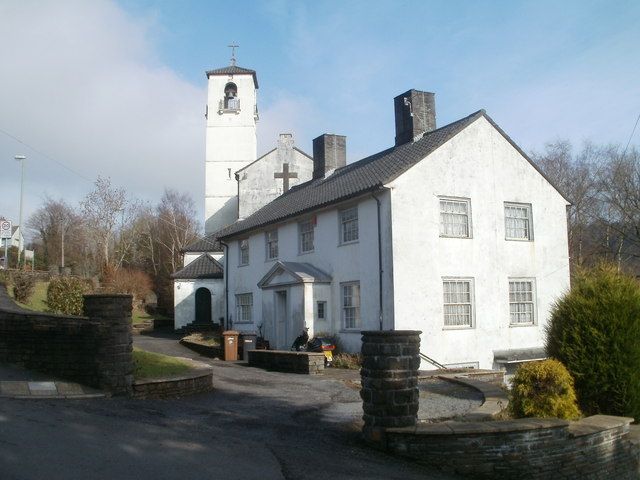
Our Lady of Peace, Newbridge, Caerphilly

== Girl Guides ==
During World War I, Roch and Anstruther-Thomson organised Girl Guides in London, and gave joint classes in drill and public speaking at the first Girl Guide Training School. She also held other roles within Girl Guiding over the years:

- 1916: County commissioner for Pembrokeshire
- 1918: County commissioner for Monmouth
- 1921-23: Deputy chief commissioner for Wales
- 1922: Silver Fish Award
- 1924-28: Chief commissioner for Wales

== Community support ==
- 1911-1918: served as chair of the Catholic Women's Suffrage Society
- 1914: wrote to the Pall Mall Gazette on behalf of the Belgian Soldiers' Fund, requesting subscriptions, clothing and food
- 1914: served on the council of the Organisation of London Social Workers
- 1914: laid the foundation stone of Milford Haven's new Liberal club
- 1919: signed the Indian Women's Franchise Address
- 1934: donated Abercarn House to the Abercarn Urban District Council. The house had at one time been the home of Sir Benjamin Hall, 1st Baron Llanover, after whom "Big Ben" may have been named
- 1937: gave £500 to Abercarn Council to be spent "solely on labour costs of various improvements which would be left over owning to money not being available."
- 1939: converted a deposit made by her father to the National Library of Wales of the Llanover Manuscripts into a gift. This meant the manuscripts, seventy-seven volumes of notes, transcripts and compositions in the hand of Iolo Morganwg, were now property of the Welsh nation. Because of the significance and generosity of this gift, the library made Roch a governor for life
- 1939-40: paid for the building of the Roman Catholic Church, "Our Lady of Peace", in Newbridge, Caerphilly, to a design by architect Philip Hepworth
- World War II: provided accommodation for an evacuated convent school
- 1948: gave her family home, Llanarth Court, including the church of St Mary and St Michael – one of the oldest Catholic churches in Wales – to the Roman Catholic Church. It was run as Blackfriars School by the Dominican Order until 1990

Roch also paid for the building of Llanarth Village Hall and gave land for the Llanarth Cricket Club.

== Author ==
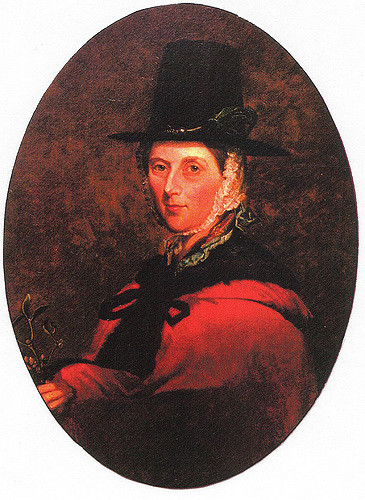
Augusta Hall (1802–1896), Roch's great-grandmother

In 1910 Roch was endowed by Gorsedd Beirdd Ynys Prydain with the "delightfully poetic" bardic name Seren Gwent (Star of Gwent). It echoed the title Gwenynen Gwent (Bee of Gwent) that had been bestowed on her Great-Grandmother, Augusta Hall, Baroness Llanover.

Roch published the following books and pamphlets:

- The Call of the Past (1913) Pub. Sands & Co.
- Peg's Patrol (1924) Pub. Religious Tract Society - introduction
- Girl Guides in the Catholic Church (1930) pub. Catholic Truth Society
- Wonder Night: A Nativity Play (1932) Pub. Catholic Truth Society
- Because of Thy Holy Cross: A Lenten play (1934)
- And With the Children: A Child's Passion play (1935) Pub. Catholic Truth Society
- The Gates of Heaven and How They Were Opened to Mankind (1936) Pub. Catholic Truth Society
- St Francis of Assisi: Lives for Children (1938) Pub. Pellegrini & Co
- The Third Order of St Francis (1939)
- St Anthony of Padua (1940) Pub. Burns Oates & Washbourne
- The Venerable Sister Mary Assunta, Franciscan Missionary of Mary: 1878-1905 (1945) Pub. Catholic Truth Society
- The Catholic Way of Worship (1951) Pub. Catholic Truth Society
- The Isle of Caldey: A Short Guide, illustrated by Edith M Gill (1952) Pub. R H Johns Limited

She contributed articles to Wales: A National Magazine in 1912 and chapters to Naomi Whelpton and Kitty Streatfield's 1926 book Rangers Pub. Pearson. She was a book reviewer for Life of the Spirit magazine from 1947 to 1953.
