= James Webber Smith =

British Royal Artillery officer (1778–1853)

Lieutenant-General James Webber Smith CB
- Born: 19 November 1778
- Died: 21 March 1853 (aged 74); Brighton
- Burial place: Hove
- Spouse: Eleanora Simeon (m. 1807)
- Military career
- Allegiance: United Kingdom
- Branch: British Army
- Service years: 1795–1853
- Rank: Lieutenant-General
- Unit: Royal Artillery
- Conflicts: French Revolutionary Wars; Mediterranean campaign; Capture of Minorca; Siege of Malta; Siege of Porto Ferrajo; Napoleonic Wars; Walcheren campaign; Peninsular War; Battle of Vitoria; Siege of San Sebastián; Battle of the Bidassoa; Battle of Nivelle; Battle of the Nive; Battle of Bayonne; Hundred Days; Battle of Waterloo
- Awards: Army Gold Medal; Military General Service Medal

Lieutenant-General James Webber Smith CB (1778–1853) was a British Royal Artillery officer who fought in the French Revolutionary Wars and Napoleonic Wars.

== Origins ==
Born on 19 November 1778 and christened on 5 August 1779 at the church of St Faith in Havant, Hampshire, he was legally the son of Rear-Admiral Charles Webber (1722–1783) and his second wife, Anne Vining Heron (1748–1805).

In fact, his biological father was almost certainly William Smith (1721–1803), Treasurer of the Ordnance, who, six months after the Admiral's death, married Anne in the parish church of Saint Marylebone on 24 November 1783. The five-year old James Webber then became the stepson of his probable father, who in his will left him a fortune provided he took the name and arms of Smith.

His legal father's brother, the Reverend William Webber (1724–1790), Canon Residentiary of Chichester Cathedral, was the husband of Anne Smith (1731–1806), his probable father's sister, and these two were parents of his first cousin, the Reverend Charles Webber who became Archdeacon of Chichester.

== Life ==
Smith received his commission as first lieutenant on 3 October 1795. He was promoted to captain lieutenant in 1802, to second captain in 1804, and to captain in 1806. He was present at the capture of Minorca in 1798, and at the siege of Malta in 1800, the defence of Porto Ferrajo in 1802, and in the expedition to Walcheren and siege of Flushing.

Smith then fought in the Peninsular War. Joining Wellington's army in January 1813 he attained the brevet rank of major in June 1813, the same month as he fought at the Battle of Vittoria. He was present at the siege of San Sebastian from July to September 1813. In that September he was promoted to lieutenant colonel. He fought at the passage of the Bidassoa in October 1813 and the Nive in December 1813, before returning to England in May 1814.

In 1815 he fought in the Waterloo Campaign, including the Battle of Waterloo, and the storming of Cambrai during the advance on Paris.

He received the gold medal and one clasp for Vittoria and San Sebastian, and the silver war medal with two clasps for Nivelle and Nive. Altogether he had two medals and eight clasps, as well as the Companionship of the Bath.

In 1824 he became a regimental major, in 1825 regimental lieutenant colonel, in 1830 brevet colonel, in 1837 regimental colonel, and in 1841 major general. He was for some time Director-General of Artillery, which office he resigned on being appointed colonel commandant of the 4th battalion, in 1848. In 1851 he attained the rank of lieutenant-general and he died in Brighton in his 75th year. He was buried at the church of St Andrew in Hove on 26 March 1853.

== Family ==
Smith married Eleanora Elizabeth Simeon (1786–1868), daughter of Sir John Simeon, 1st Baronet, and his wife Rebecca Cornwall, on 12 December 1807 at the parish church of St Marylebone. They had eight children, including:

- General James Webber Smith CB (1809–1878), Colonel of the 14th (Buckinghamshire) Regiment, who married Margaret Jeannette Bell (1823–1857) and had four children. Their daughter Julia was the grandmother of actor David Niven.
- Clara Webber Smith (1816–1870), who married George Ignatius Goold (1805–1879) and became the mother of Sir James Stephen Goold, 4th Baronet.
