= Wharton baronets =

Extinct baronetcy in the Baronetage of England

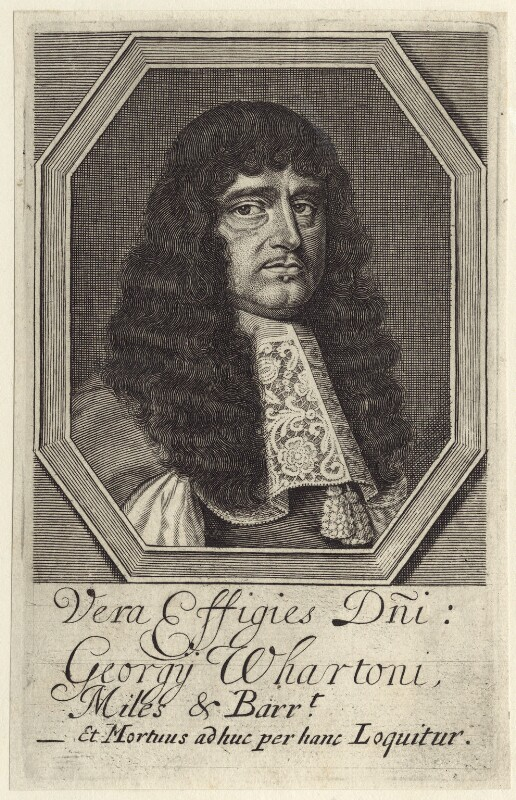
A 1683 engraving of Sir George Wharton, 1st Baronet

The Wharton Baronetcy, of Kirby Kendall in the County of Westmorland, was a title in the Baronetage of England. It was created on 19 December 1677 for the Royalist soldier and astrologer George Wharton. The title became extinct on the death of the second Baronet sometime c. 1741.

== Wharton baronets, of Kirby Kendall (1677) ==
Escutcheon of the Wharton baronets of Kirby Kendall

- Sir George Wharton, 1st Baronet (1617–1681)
- Sir Polycarpus Wharton, 2nd Baronet (c. 1652–c. 1741)
