= John Booker (astrologer) =

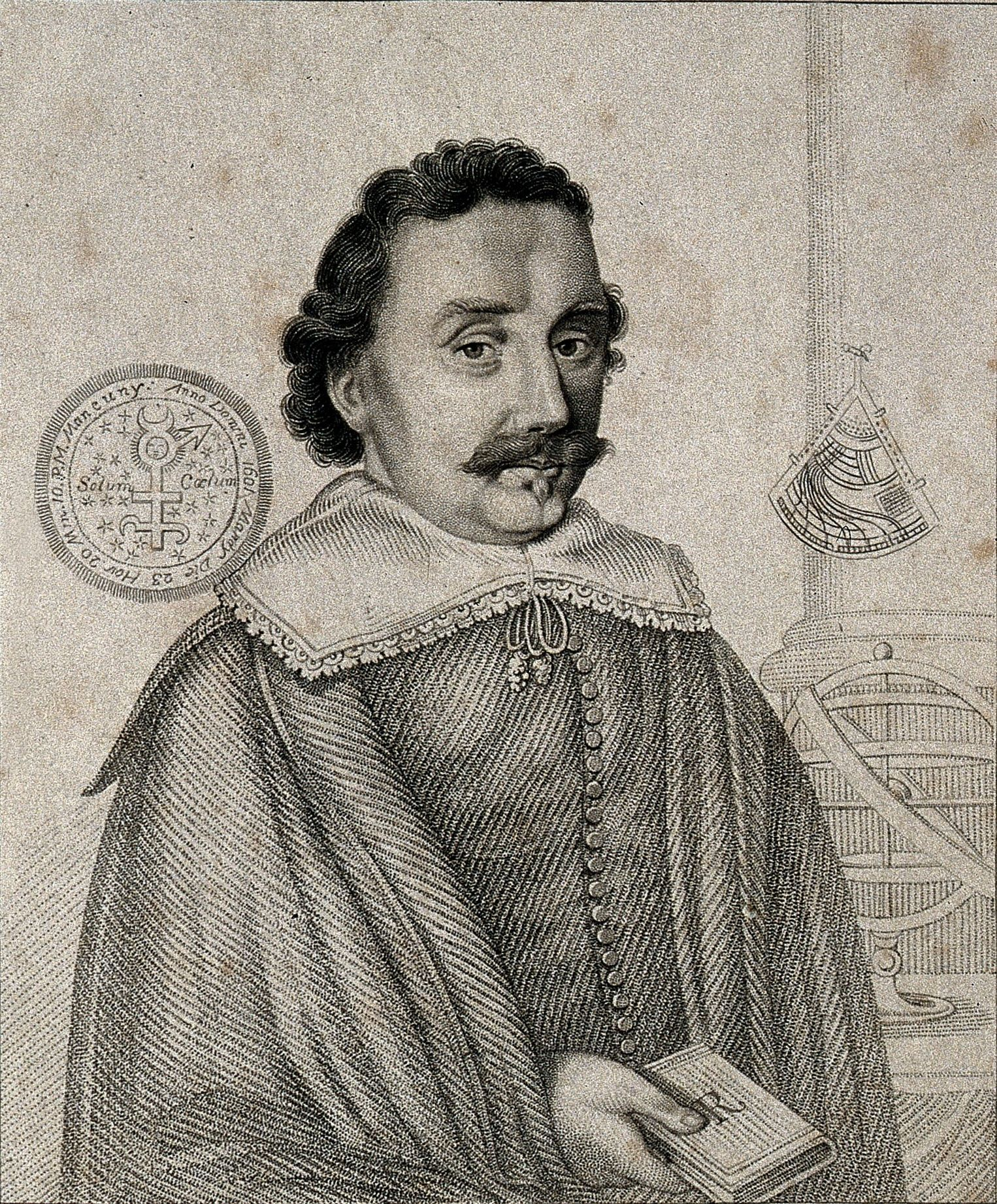
Portrait. Credit: Wellcome Library

John Booker (1601–1667) was an English astrologer, respected in that career for over 30 years. In the 1640s he was appointed licenser of mathematical publications, and so in effect a censor of astrological works, for the Stationers' Company.

== Life ==
He was born at Manchester 23 March 1601 OS (equals April 3, 1601); his nativity is among the Ashmolean manuscripts. He was apprenticed to a haberdasher in Central London, taught writing at Hadley School in Middlesex, and clerk to two city magistrates.

The first number of his almanac, the Telescopium Uranium, was published in 1631. He obtained a reputation from a prediction of the deaths of Gustavus Adolphus and Frederick V, Elector Palatine, founded on a solar eclipse. In 1640 William Lilly thought highly of him, but they quarrelled over Booker's actions as licenser. Booker also engaged in violent controversy with Sir George Wharton.

In 1648 Booker and Lilly were required to come to the siege of Colchester to encourage the Parliamentarian troops with predictions.

At the Restoration he petitioned for leave to continue the publication of his almanac. He died on 8 April 1667, after three years' suffering from dysentery. Elias Ashmole bought his books and papers.

== Works ==
His Bloody Irish Almanack contains historical material on the Irish rebellion, and he is the author of Tractatus Paschalis, or a Discourse concerning the Holy Feast of Easter (1664).
