= William de Grey, 1st Baron Walsingham =

British lawyer, judge and politician

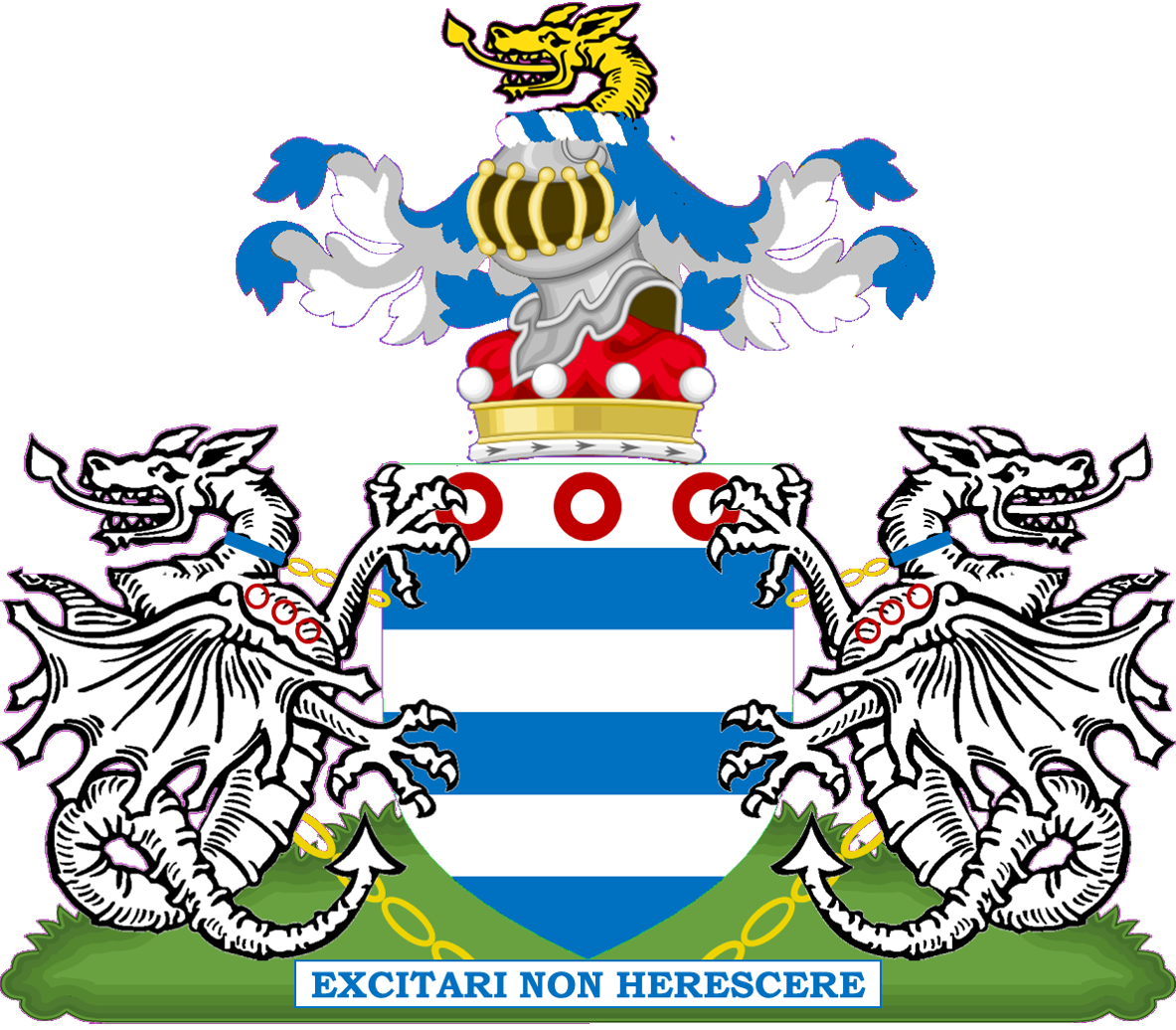
- Coat of arms
- Tenure: member of the 12th Parliament of Great Britain, member of the 13th Parliament of Great Britain, Solicitor General for England and Wales (1763–1766)
- Predecessor: member of the 12th Parliament of Great Britain, member of the 13th Parliament of Great Britain, Solicitor General for England and Wales
- Successor: member of the 12th Parliament of Great Britain, member of the 13th Parliament of Great Britain, Solicitor General for England and Wales
- Years active: 1763–1766
- Born: 7 July 1719
- Died: 9 May 1781
- Spouse(s): Mary Cowper
- Father: Thomas de Grey
- Occupation: Judge, politician

William de Grey, 1st Baron Walsingham PC KC (7 July 1719 – 9 May 1781), was a British lawyer, judge and politician. He served as Lord Chief Justice of the Common Pleas between 1771 and 1780.

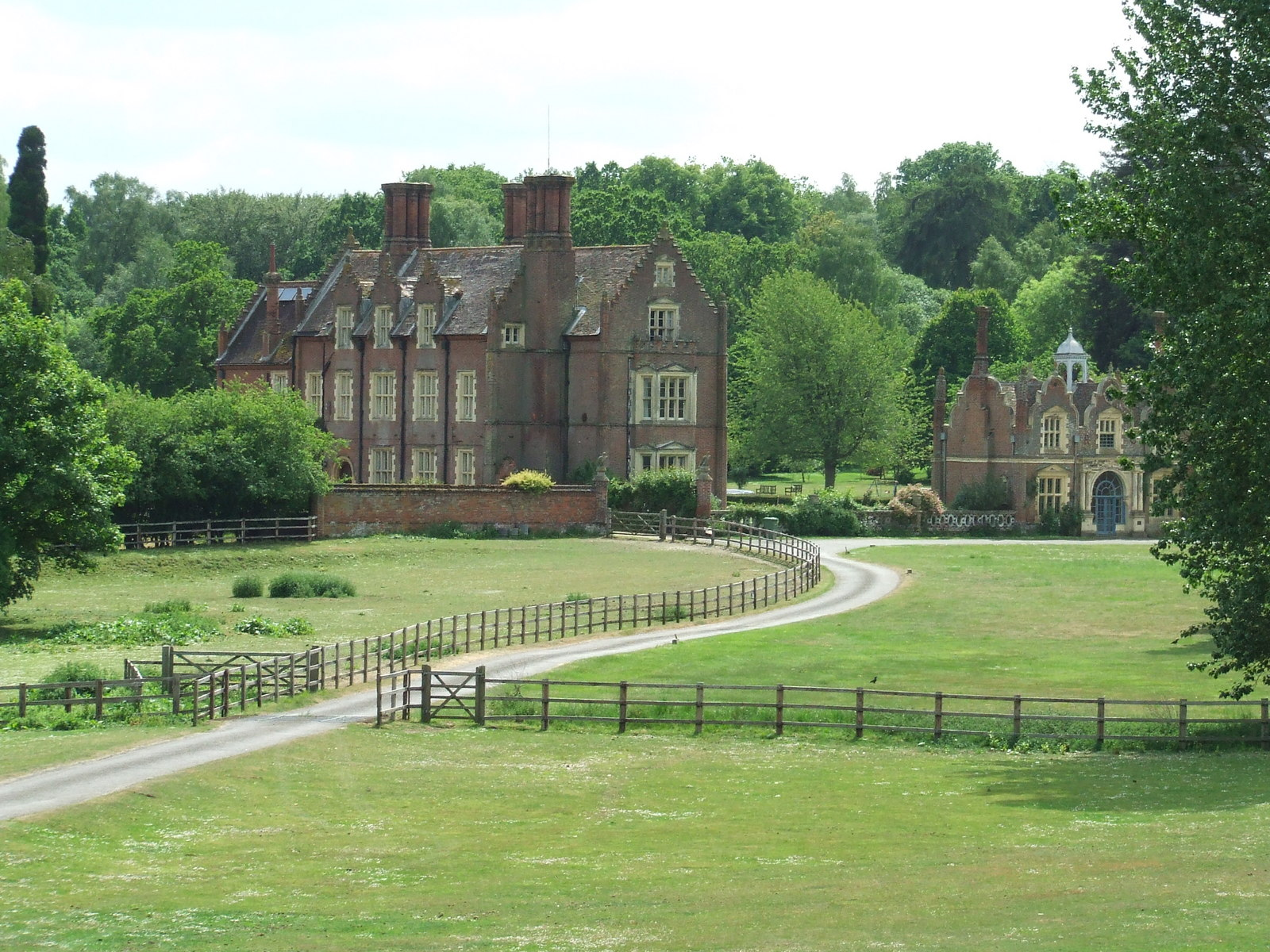
Merton Hall - de Grey family seat in Norfolk

de Grey was the third son of Thomas de Grey, MP, of Merton, Norfolk, and Elizabeth Windham, daughter of William Windham. He was the younger brother of another Thomas de Grey. The de Grey family had been settled in Norfolk since the 14th century. He was educated at Trinity Hall, Cambridge, was called to the Bar, Middle Temple, in 1742, and became a King's Counsel in 1758. Between 1761 and 1763 he was Solicitor General to Queen Charlotte.

de Grey entered Parliament for Newport, Cornwall, in 1761, a seat he held until 1770, and then represented Cambridge University from 1770 to 1771, and held office under George Grenville and Lord Rockingham as Solicitor-General between 1763 and 1766 and under William Pitt the Elder, the Duke of Grafton and Lord North as Attorney-General between 1766 and 1771. He failed to secure the conviction of Henry Sampson Woodfall for the publication of one of the Letters of Junius, which was deemed by the Crown to be a seditious libel; the jury thought otherwise and Lord Mansfield declared a mistrial.

In 1771 de Grey was appointed Lord Chief Justice of the Common Pleas, a post he held until 1780, when he was forced to resign due to ill health. He had been knighted in 1766 and on his retirement in 1780 he was raised to the peerage as Baron Walsingham, of Walsingham in the County of Norfolk.

Lord Walsingham married Mary, daughter of William Cowper, in 1743. They had one son and a daughter. He died in May 1781, aged 61, and was succeeded in the barony by his only son Thomas. Lady Walsingham died in 1800.

== Principal cases ==
- Rex v Woodfall, 1770
- Scott v. Shepherd 96 Eng. Rep. 525 (K.B. 1773)
- Grace v Smith [1775]

== Notes ==
Parliament of Great Britain
| Preceded by John Lee; Richard Bull | Member of Parliament for Newport, Cornwall; 1761–1770; With: Richard Bull | Succeeded by Richard Bull; Richard Henry Alexander Bennet |
| Preceded by Thomas Townshend; Charles Yorke | Member of Parliament for Cambridge University; 1770–1771; With: Thomas Townshend | Succeeded by Thomas Townshend; Richard Croftes |
Political offices
| Preceded by Sir Fletcher Norton | Solicitor-General; 1763–1766 | Succeeded by Edward Willes |
| Preceded by Charles Yorke | Attorney-General; 1766–1771 | Succeeded by Edward Thurlow |
Legal offices
| Preceded by Sir John Eardley Wilmot | Chief Justice of the Common Pleas; 1771–1780 | Succeeded by The Lord Loughborough |
Peerage of Great Britain
| New creation | Baron Walsingham; 1780–1781 | Succeeded by Thomas de Grey |
