= William Nevill, 16th Baron Bergavenny =

English noble

William Nevill
- Baron Bergavenny
- Born: about 1698
- Died: 21 September 1744; Bath, Somerset
- Noble family: House of Neville
- Spouses: Catherine Tatton; Lady Rebecca Herbert
- Issue: George Neville, 1st Earl of Abergavenny
- Father: Captain Edward Nevill, Royal Navy great-great-grandson of Edward Nevill, 8th Baron Bergavenny
- Mother: Hannah Thorpe

William Nevill, 16th Baron Bergavenny (also Abergavenny; c. 1698 – 21 September 1744), was an English peer and courtier who held positions in the Royal Household and built a country mansion in Sussex.

== Origins ==
Born about 1698, he was the only son of Edward Nevill (1664–1701), a Captain in the Royal Navy, who died aboard HMS Lincoln off the coast of Virginia, and his wife Hannah Thorpe (1668–1764), daughter of Gervase Thorpe (died 1716), who lived at Brockhurst, near East Grinstead.

== Life ==
On the death without children of his first cousin Edward Nevill, 15th Baron Bergavenny, he succeeded to the barony, taking his seat in the House of Lords on 12 November 1724. Deciding to leave the ancient family house at Birling in Kent, he sold inherited lands and applied the proceeds to buy a block of farmland in Forest Row, where he created a park and built in it the mansion of Kidbrooke Park, since altered into Michael Hall School. In 1737 he obtained the post of Captain of the Yeomen of the Guard and in 1739 was appointed Master of the Jewel Office. He died in Bath on 21 September 1744 and was buried at East Grinstead, being succeeded in the barony by his eldest son.

== Family ==
On 20 May 1725 he married Catherine Tatton, widow of the previous baron. She was the elder daughter of Lieutenant-General William Tatton and his first wife Elizabeth Bull, sister of Sir John Bull. After having two children, George Nevill to whom King George II was godfather, and Catherine Nevill, she died giving birth to a third child Edward Nevill, on 4 December 1729. Shortly after her death, he was awarded 10,000 pounds in damages, worth over 1.6 million pounds in 2022, in a law case brought against his former friend Richard Lydell for criminal conversation with her. An obituary poem called her: "Young, thoughtless, gay, unfortunately fair."

On 20 May 1732 he married Lady Rebecca Herbert (died 20 October 1758), daughter of Thomas Herbert, 8th Earl of Pembroke and his wife Margaret Sawyer, with whom he had four children: William Nevill, Harriet Nevill, Mary Nevill, and Sophia Nevill.

Political offices
Preceded by The Viscount Townshend	Master of the Jewel Office; 1739–1744	Succeeded by The Earl of Lincoln
Peerage of England
Preceded by Edward Nevill	Baron Bergavenny; 1724–1744	Succeeded by George Nevill
