= George Nevill, 14th Baron Bergavenny =

George Neville
- Baron Bergavenny
- Born: 16 May 1702
- Died: 15 November 1732 (aged 30)
- Noble family: House of Neville
- Spouse: Elizabeth Thornicroft
- Father: George Nevill, 13th Baron Bergavenny
- Mother: Anne Walker

George Nevill, de facto 14th (de jure 2nd) Baron Bergavenny (16 May 1702 – 15 November 1723) was an English peer.

George was the second, but eldest surviving, son of George Nevill, 13th Baron Bergavenny and his wife Anne Walker. He was born on 16 May 1702 and baptised on 26 August 1702 at St Martin-in-the-Fields. On 7 March 1720/1, he succeeded to the barony on the death of his father. He matriculated at University College, Oxford on 13 September 1722.

Bergavenny married Elizabeth Thornicroft (d. 1778) on 21 February 1722/3 at St Mary Magdalen Old Fish Street. He died of smallpox on 15 November 1723 in Soho Square, and was buried at Sheffield, Sussex. He had posthumous children by Elizabeth, twin girls born on 20 November 1723, both of whom died on 1 December 1723. As he died without male issue, the Barony passed to his younger brother, Edward Nevill, 15th Baron Bergavenny. His widow married Alured Pincke of Tottenham High Cross (d. 1755). Thomas Hearne described Bergavenny as "a most ingenious sensible young gentleman, but very much deformed".

== Notes ==
Peerage of England
Preceded by George Nevill	Baron Bergavenny; 1721–1723	Succeeded by Edward Nevill
