= William Tatton =

British Army general (1659–1736)

Lieutenant-General William Tatton
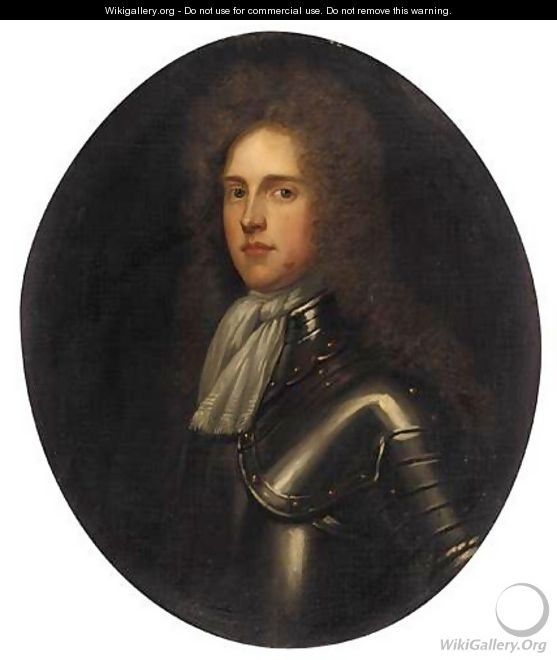
- Born: 1659
- Died: June 1736 (aged 76–77); Westminster, Middlesex
- Burial place: Hillingdon, Middlesex
- Military career
- Allegiance: Great Britain
- Branch: British Army
- Service years: 1685–1736
- Rank: Lieutenant-General
- Commands: Horse Guards; 24th Regiment of Foot; The Buffs, the 3rd Regiment of Foot
- Conflicts: Nine Years' War; War of the Spanish Succession; Battle of Blenheim; Jacobite Rising of 1715

William Tatton (1659–1736) was a career soldier in the British Army who rose to the rank of Lieutenant-General.

== Career ==
As a trusted associate of John Churchill, 1st Duke of Marlborough throughout the War of the Spanish Succession, in April 1704 the Duke appointed him Colonel of the Horse Guards. In August 1704 he led the advance party for the Duke's bold dash to the River Danube, which led to the crushing defeat of the French and Bavarian forces at the Battle of Blenheim. After this victory, Tatton was made Colonel of a Foot Regiment (which would later become the 24th Regiment of Foot and the South Wales Borderers), a post he held until 1708.

After the war, the Army was involved in suppressing the Jacobite Rebellion of 1715, when Tatton was responsible for bringing convicted rebels to London to be imprisoned.

He finally reached the rank of Lieutenant-General. From 24 November 1729 until his death, he was Colonel of The Buffs, the 3rd Regiment of Foot, then still known as the Holland Regiment serving the Prince of Orange.

He died in June 1736 and was buried at Hillingdon in Middlesex. His will was proved in London on 19 June 1736.

== Family ==
His first marriage was to Elizabeth Bull, sister of Sir John Bull. Their daughter Katharine in 1724 married Edward Nevill, 15th Baron Bergavenny and in 1725, after his death, his cousin William Nevill, 16th Baron Bergavenny.

He married secondly Ann Harvey, daughter of Dr Gideon Harvey, on 26 February 1717 at the church of St Mary Aldermary, London. Their daughter Elizabeth in 1741 married Henry Flower, 1st Viscount Ashbrook.

His arms were « quarterly first and fourth ar a crescent sa second and third gu a crescent ar Crest a greyhound sejant tied at the neck to a hawthorn tree ppr by a band or ».

Military offices
Preceded by Thomas Pitt, 1st Earl of Londonderry	Colonel of Regiment of Foot; 1729–1737	Succeeded by Thomas Howard
