= Richard Henry Alexander Bennet (senior) =

Richard Henry Alexander Bennet FRS (11 May 1743 – 14 March 1814) was a British landowner, who represented Newport in Parliament from 1770 to 1774.

== Life ==
Richard was the eldest son of Bennet Alexander Bennet, and Mary Ash (the daughter of Benjamin Ash of Ongar, Essex). The year before his birth, his father assumed the surname of Bennet upon inheriting the Babraham estate from his mother Levina, daughter of Sir Levinus Bennet, 2nd Baronet. Bennet Alexander Bennet died at the end of 1745, leaving his widow to raise Richard and his sister, Levina (who in 1762 married John Luther). Mary returned to Ongar with her children, and in 1747, married again to Richard Bull.

Richard Henry was educated at Westminster School, where he was sent in 1752. In 1756, Humphry Morice, who controlled the electoral patronage of Newport, returned Richard Bull for one of the seats there. He sold the Babraham estate in 1765. He was elected a Fellow of the Royal Society in 1767.

In 1770, when William de Grey resigned to contest Cambridge University, a vacancy arose at Newport, and Morice put Bennet into Parliament alongside his stepfather. Like his patron, Bennet was an administration supporter, although he voted in opposition on the naval captains' petition for additional pay in 1773 and the bill in 1774 to make Grenville's Act perpetual. At the general election that year, Morice, facing heightened opposition, stood himself in both his boroughs, displacing Bennet. While Morice was victorious in both and chose to sit for Launceston, Bennet did not return to Parliament, and died in 1814. In 1809, he inherited Northcourt Manor, in the Isle of Wight, from his half-sister, Elizabeth Bull.

== Family ==
On 20 January 1766, Bennet married Elizabeth Amelia Burrell, the daughter of Peter Burrell, MP for Morice's other borough of Launceston. With her he had one son, Richard Henry Alexander, and two daughters. They were:

- Emilia Emma married in 1787 Sir John Swinburne, 6th Baronet.
- Isabella Julia Levina (1772–1867) (also known as Julia Isabella Levina, or Julia Lavinia) married in 1805 Willoughby Gordon. She was an artist, known as Lady Gordon. She took lessons in watercolour: from Edward Kennion, J. M. W. Turner, Thomas Girtin and David Cox. In 1847 she published a book of etchings.

Parliament of Great Britain
Preceded by Richard Bull; William de Grey	Member of Parliament for Newport; 1770–1774; With: Richard Bull	Succeeded by Richard Bull; Humphry Morice
