= Charles Webber (priest) =

English archdeacon (1762–1848)

The Ven. Charles Webber, MA (1762–1848) was Archdeacon of Chichester from 1808 until his death.

== Life ==
Baptised on 17 May 1762 in the church of All Saints in Chichester, he was the eldest surviving son of the Reverend William Webber (1724–1790), a canon of Chichester Cathedral. The Canon's father, Robert Webber, was said to be an illegitimate son of Charles Lennox, 1st Duke of Richmond, himself an illegitimate son of King Charles II, while the Canon's mother was Mary Maybank, reputedly a descendant of Louise de Kérouaille, Duchess of Portsmouth, a mistress of King Charles II. William's mother had less elevated but wholly legitimate origins, being Anne Smith (1731–1806), daughter of John Smith, a surgeon in Chichester, and his wife Sarah Buckenham. Among his uncles were Rear-Admiral Charles Webber (1722–1783), nominal father of Lieutenant-General James Webber Smith, as well as the rector of West Stoke outside Chichester, the Reverend Charles Smith (1729–1803). His younger brother, the Reverend James Webber (1772–1847), became Dean of Ripon.

A graduate of Christ Church, Oxford, he was a master at the Prebendal School and from 1788 Vicar of Boxgrove, holding the living for the rest of his life. Appointed to the Chapter, he was granted the Prebend of Eartham on 6 May 1801, later acquiring the Prebend of Bishopshurst. In 1803 he was made a Canon Residentiary of the cathedral for life. Then on 3 May 1808 he was installed as Archdeacon. From 1808 to 1828 he also held the post of vicar of Amport in Hampshire. From 1825 to 1828 he served as Warden of the Hospital of St. Mary, Chichester, and on 8 December 1826 was made a trustee of the Bishop's daughter, Sibella Jane Carr, when she married a local landowner, Charles Peckham Peckham, relinquishing the rôle on 2 March 1840.

Dying on 15 June 1848, he was buried on 22 June 1848 at Boxgrove Priory.

== Family ==
On 18 November 1789 at St George's, Hanover Square, he married Mary Peirson (1762–1845), daughter of a Yorkshire landowner, Francis Peirson of Lowthorpe, and his wife Sarah Cogdell. Mary's brother was the celebrated Army officer Francis Peirson. They had six children, including:

Reverend Charles Webber (1794–1850), also a canon residentiary of Chichester and warden of the Hospital of St. Mary.
William Charles Webber (1797–1869), a commander in the Royal Navy.
Reverend George Henry Webber (1801–1858), a prebendary of Chichester from 1827 to 1840 and of Ripon from 1830 to 1858.

== Notes ==
Church of England titles
| Preceded by Thomas Taylor | Archdeacon of Chichester; 1808–1840 | Succeeded by Henry Edward Manning |
