= Charleton House =

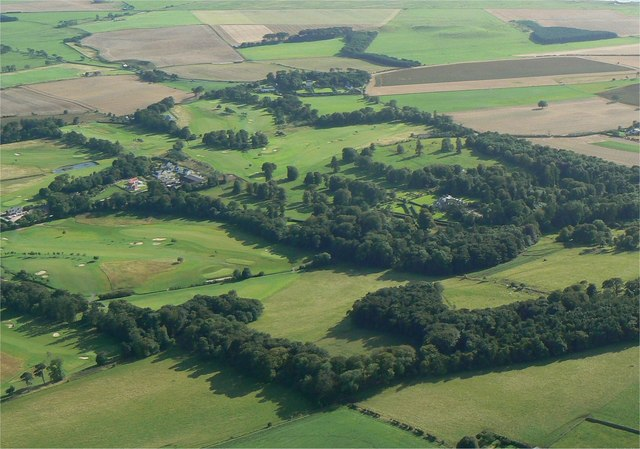
- Aerial view of the Charleton Estate

- Location of Charleton House in Fife
- 56.2244°N 2.8729°W

History
- Built: 1759
- Built for: John Thomson

Site notes
- Architect(s): William Adam, William Burn

Listed Building – Category A
- Designated: 1 February 1972
- Reference no.: LB8581

Inventory of Gardens and Designed Landscapes in Scotland
- Official name: Charleton House
- Designated: 31 March 2005
- Reference no.: GDL00100

Charleton House is located in the East Neuk of Fife, eastern Scotland. It lies around 1.5 kilometres (0.93 mi) west of Colinsburgh, and 5 kilometres (3.1 mi) east of Lower Largo. The house dates from the mid 18th century, with later additions, and is the home of Baron Bonde.

Charleton House is protected as a category A listed building, and the grounds are included on the Inventory of Gardens and Designed Landscapes in Scotland, the national listing of significant gardens.

== History ==
Charleton House was built by John Thomson in 1759, on land bought by his father from Colonel John Hope in 1713. The house may have been built from designs by William Adam, and was designed as part of a large formal garden with radial avenues, and a southward vista to the Bass Rock. Colonel John Anstruther-Thomson (1776–1833) inherited the estate in 1797, and in 1807 he married Clementina Adam of Blair Adam. Anstruther-Thomson commissioned classical extensions to the house in 1815–1817, and a further east wing, designed by William Burn in 1832. The surrounding parkland was informalised around this time, with woodland clumps and trees replacing the avenues. Anstruther-Thomson's son, also John, commissioned further additions from Burn after 1833.

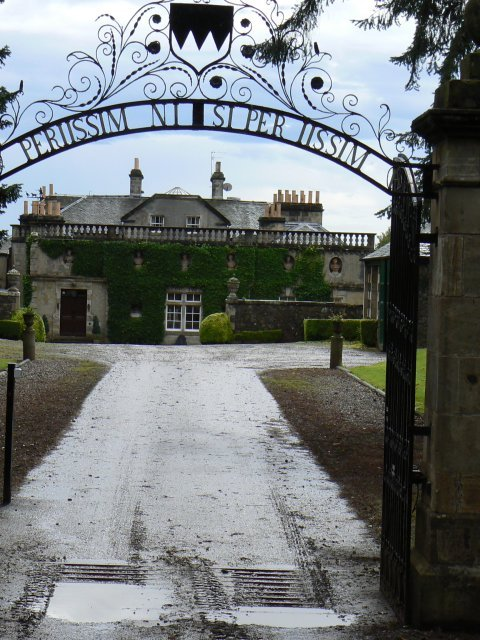
Entrance (north) front of the house, as remodelled by Lorimer

In 1904, the estate passed to Colonel Charles Anstruther-Thomson (1855–1925). He had alterations to the house made by Robert Lorimer, including moving the main entrance to the north side. In the gardens, he reinstated some of the avenues, and created a Japanese garden, following a visit to Japan in the 1890s. In 1925 the estate was inherited by his daughter Grizel Anstruther Thomson, who married the Swedish diplomat baron Knut Corfitz Bonde and subsequently moved to Sweden. Their son Baron John Bonde (1918–2009) returned to live at Charleton in 1955, and it remains in the family. The house is operated as an events venue with accommodation, and a golf course was laid out in the parkland in 1994.
