= William Smith (British civil servant) =

English civil servant (1721–1803)

William Smith JP

Treasurer of the Ordnance

Personal details
- Born: 1721 Chichester, Sussex, England
- Died: 1803 (aged 81–82)
- Resting place: Chichester, Sussex, England
- Spouse(s): Jane Parker; Anne Vining Heron
- Children: James Webber Smith
- Education: Winchester College

William Smith (1721–1803) was an English civil servant who held the post of Treasurer of the Ordnance throughout the French Revolutionary Wars.

== Origins ==
Christened on 3 May 1721 at the church of St. Peter the Great, Chichester, he was the eldest son of John Smith (1688–1749), a surgeon in Chichester, and his first wife Sarah Buckenham (1693–1732), daughter of the Reverend John Buckenham. His younger brother, the Reverend Charles Smith (1729–1803), became rector of West Stoke outside Chichester, while his sister, Anne Smith (1731–1806), married the Reverend William Webber, a Canon Residentiary of Chichester Cathedral, and became the mother of the Venerable Charles Webber, Archdeacon of Chichester.

== Career ==
After education at Winchester College, to which he was admitted in 1730, he was employed by Charles Lennox, 3rd Duke of Richmond as his secretary. In 1781 he was made a Justice of the Peace for Sussex. and, when the Duke became Master-General of the Ordnance, on 27 May 1782 he was appointed Treasurer of the Ordnance. Both resigned in 1783, but returned later that year and he held the Treasurership from 30 December 1783 until his death.

In the 1784 general election, the Duke persuaded him, against the advice of family and friends, to stand for the seat of Chichester which returned two MPs. He and the sitting MP, Thomas Steele, overtly supported the Duke but a third candidate George White Thomas, son-in-law of a popular past MP, entered the fray as an independent. The contest became heated, with Smith coming under personal attack over his public and his private life, and on polling day of 1 April 1784 he came last with only 23% of the vote. He did not attempt to re-enter politics.

Through his lifetime association with the Duke and holding a lucrative office from 1783 on, hem became rich, owning at his death a country residence at West Ashling in the parish of Funtington, a freehold town house on Bryanston Street in the parish of St Marylebone, and lands in Hampshire. In addition he had major holdings of Government stock.

== Family ==
He first married Jane Parker (1724–1780), daughter of George Parker of Amberley Castle, but they had no children. She brought him the manor of Denmead in the parish of Hambledon, which was sold in 1769. The couple lived at Droxford, where he was in 1754 when appointed trustee of the will of his great-aunt.

Before his wife's death he had begun an affair with Anne Vining Heron (1748–1805), the wife of Rear-Admiral Charles Webber (1722–1783), and was almost certainly the biological father of Anne's son James. Six months and a day after the Admiral's death, at the church of St Marylebone on 24 November 1783, he married Anne and became stepfather to her children. The couple then had two daughters, together with a son who died young.

Dying on 12 October 1803, he was buried on 20 October 1803 at the church of St. Peter the Great, Chichester. After generous bequests to his wife, his will of 20 February 1802 that was proved in London on 3 November 1803, set up trust funds of 10,000 pounds, equivalent to over 800,000 pounds in 2014, for his four stepchildren and 40,000 pounds, say 3.25 million in 2014 pounds, for his two daughters Emily and Louisa. In addition he left all his real estate, worth at least 25,000 pounds (over 2 million now), and the residue of his personal estate to his stepson James, lawfully the Admiral's child, provided he took the name and arms of Smith. The young man did so, and as James Webber Smith rose to be a General in the British Army.

His elder daughter Emily Smith (1784–1861) in 1805 married mine owner Ralph Skinner Gowland (1758–1821), son of the MP Ralph Gowland, and had four children. Her younger sister Louisa Mary Smith (1789–1850) in 1810 married John Edward Jones (1786–1854), a Royal Artillery officer who became a Major-General, and had eight children.
