= Treasurer of the Ordnance =

Former office in the United Kingdom

Office of the Treasurer of the Ordnance
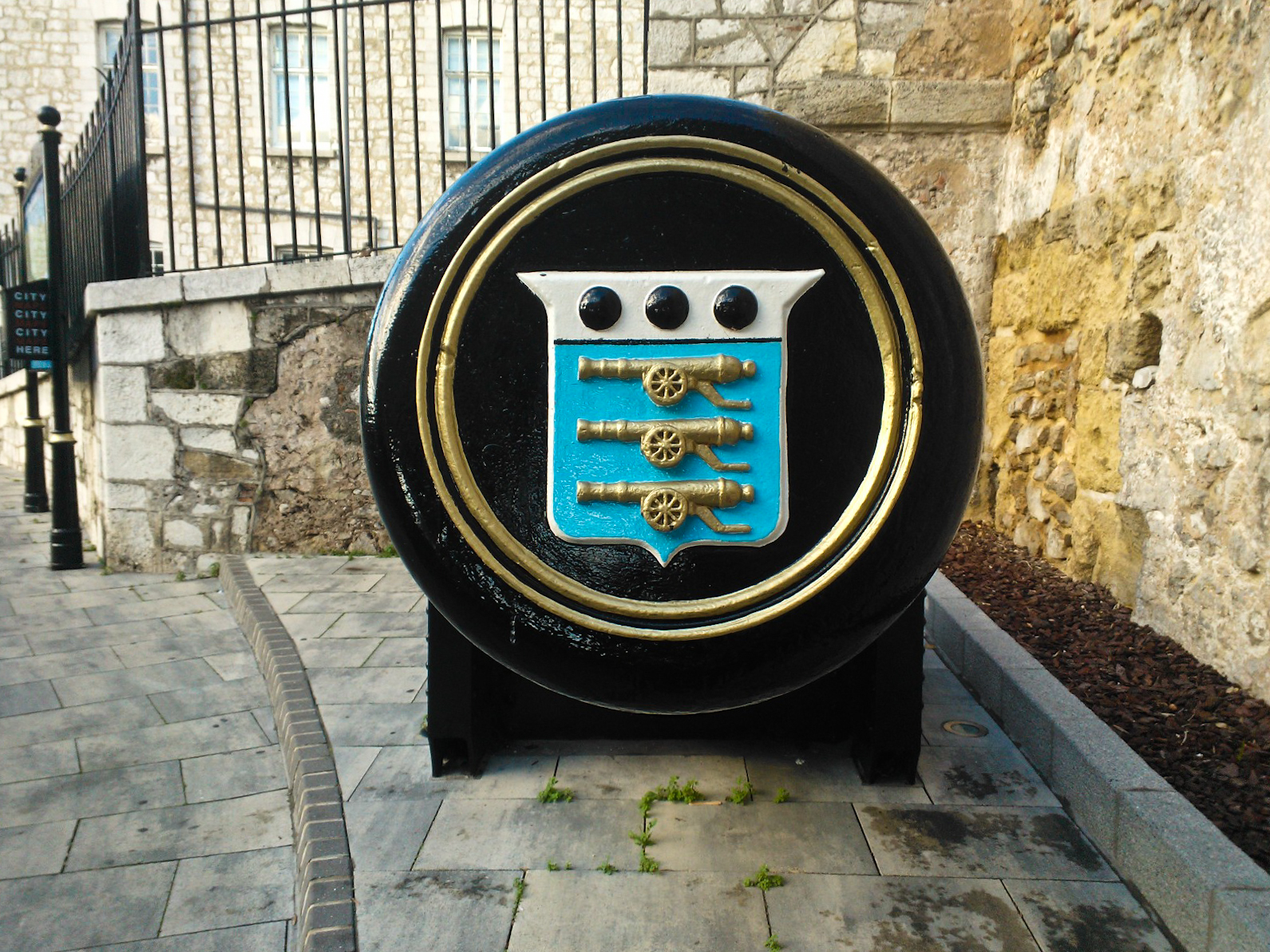
- Board of Ordnance Arms preserved on a gun tampion in Gibraltar
- Reports to: Master-General of the Ordnance
- Appointer: Prime Minister; Subject to formal approval by the Queen-in-Council
- Term length: Not fixed (typically 3–9 years)
- Inaugural holder: Sir George Wharton, Bt
- Formation: 1670-1835

The Treasurer of the Ordnance was a subordinate of the Master-General of the Ordnance in the United Kingdom, the office being created in 1670. The office was abolished in 1836 and its duties merged with that of several others to form the office of Paymaster General.

== Treasurers of the Ordnance ==
- 25 November 1670: Sir George Wharton, 1st Baronet
- 12 August 1681: Charles Bertie
- 8 June 1699: Harry Mordaunt
- 16 June 1702: Charles Bertie
- 28 May 1705: Harry Mordaunt
- 30 June 1712: Charles Eversfield
- 2 December 1714: Harry Mordaunt
- 21 May 1720: John Plumptre
- 31 December 1751: Francis Gashry
- 10 June 1762: Charles Jenkinson
- 10 May 1763: John Ross Mackye
- 28 November 1780: William Adam
- 27 May 1782: William Smith
- 10 May 1783: William Adam
- 12 January 1784: William Smith
- 28 October 1803: Joseph Hunt
- 20 February 1806: Alexander Davison
- 7 April 1807: Joseph Hunt
- 30 January 1810: Thomas Alcock
- 20 June 1818: William Holmes
- 31 January 1831: Thomas Creevey
- 12 January 1835: Alexander Perceval
- 9 May 1835: Sir Henry Parnell, 4th Baronet
