= Lady Angela Forbes =

British socialite and novelist

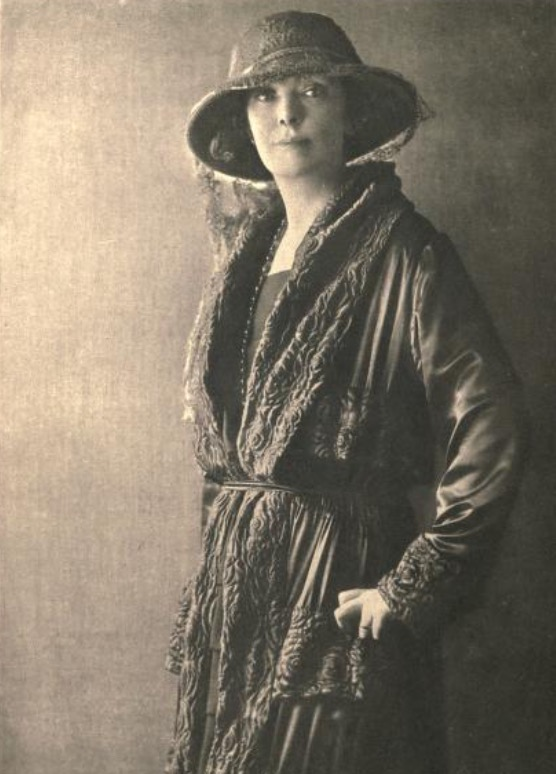
- Lady Angela Forbes, photographed by Dorothy Wilding, 1921
- Born: 11 June 1876; Mayfair, England
- Died: 22 October 1950 (aged 74); Jersey
- Occupation: Author
- Known for: British socialite and novelist
- Spouse: James Stewart Forbes
- Children: 2
- Parent(s): Robert St Clair-Erskine, 4th Earl of Rosslyn; Blanche Adeliza FitzRoy

Lady Angela Selina Bianca Forbes (née St Clair-Erskine; 11 June 1876 – 22 October 1950) was a British socialite and novelist who was known as a forces sweetheart for organising soldiers' canteens in France during the First World War. She reverted to her maiden name in 1929.

== Early life ==
Forbes was born at 8 Grafton Street, Mayfair, the youngest daughter of Robert St Clair-Erskine, 4th Earl of Rosslyn and Blanche Adeliza FitzRoy. Her sisters were Millicent Leveson-Gower, Duchess of Sutherland and Sybil Fane, Countess of Westmorland, and her brothers were the 5th Earl of Rosslyn and Alexander FitzRoy St Clair-Erskine. She was also a half-sister of Frances Maynard, who became Daisy Greville, Countess of Warwick, and of Blanche Maynard, who married Lord Algernon Charles Gordon-Lennox and was the mother of Ivy Gordon-Lennox, later Duchess of Portland. The 5th Duke of Sutherland, the 14th Earl of Westmorland, and the 6th Earl of Warwick were her nephews.

Forbes grew up at Dysart, Fife, near Kirkcaldy, and at Lady Anne's House near Stamford, Lincolnshire, now Lady Anne's Hotel. She was educated by German governesses. She grew to a height of almost six feet and was considered vivacious rather than pretty, unlike her sisters. She resisted finishing her education in Germany, explaining that she had no wish to see Germany, having only just "escaped from German governesses", so she was sent back to the schoolroom in Scotland.

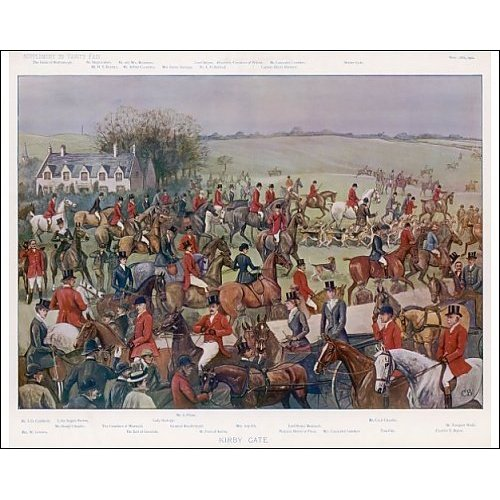
Vanity Fair illustration, November 1901

Forbes spent much of her life fox-hunting and shooting, and she was depicted riding side-saddle at a meeting of the Quorn in a Vanity Fair magazine chromolithograph by Cuthbert Bradley. In her memoirs, she reveals that she was considered an enfant terrible and that Elinor Glyn used her as the prototype of Elizabeth in her book Visits of Elizabeth (1900).

== Career ==
=== Married life and after ===
On 28 April 1896, Lady Angela married James Stewart Forbes (1872–1957), an officer of the Imperial Yeomanry, with the use of Stafford House for the occasion, and they went on to have two daughters, Marigold (born 1897) and Flavia (born 1902). In 1907 they were divorced.

Between 1910 and 1912, Forbes published four novels, mainly because she was hard up and needed to make some money. The Publisher magazine said of her novel The Other Woman's Shadow (1912)

Lady Angela Forbes’s story presents us with a number of smart society people; they chatter and intrigue in various country houses, and at other times we meet them in London. Most of them indulge in epigrammatic talk, which, though not strictly true to life, is excusable in so far as it makes their conversations light and amusing.

By 1912 she became the mistress of Lord Elcho and thus joined the social circle known as the Souls. Forbes was then living either in her own house at Le Touquet or in Elcho's country house in East Lothian. She has been called "a tough, vibrant personality whose language would make a trooper blush". The writer Edith Sitwell (after Forbes had feuded with her brother Sacheverell) later described her as "an elderly gorilla afflicted with sex appeal".

=== World War I ===
At the outbreak of the First World War, Lady Angela went as a volunteer to Dr Haden Guest's hospital in Paris, where she took notes for the surgeons. A few weeks later she was in Boulogne and saw trains of wounded soldiers coming in, and was surprised that they were left on the quay for hours with no food or drink. In November 1914 she started a canteen for the soldiers in the station waiting-room. This turned into a string of canteens, formally known as the British Soldiers' Buffets, less formally as "Angelinas". Every train of wounded men was met by Lady Angela and her volunteers, largely friends and relations. At first, the supplies needed were funded by appeals in the newspapers, but in 1915, both the Red Cross and the British Soldiers' Buffets began to charge for their food and drink. In 1916, Lady Angela opened other canteens in Étaples, the main depôt and transit camp for the British Expeditionary Force in France, to which wounded men returned. One canteen was for the workmen building the British army camp there, another for the British soldiers who were drilled there, and a third in the railway station, feeding men on their way to the front. These canteens were often open all night as well as all day. From the profits of her canteens, Forbes built fourteen recreational huts for the soldiers. However, senior officers found her abrasive, and Sir Douglas Haig, Commander of the British Expeditionary Force, was hostile to her. A few days after the Étaples mutiny of September 1917, she was ordered to leave the base, without any explanation, at which she protested, to no avail. On 5 February 1918 the case was raised in the House of Lords by her former lover Lord Ribblesdale, and Lord Wemyss (previously Lord Elcho) spoke at length in her defence. Lord Derby, the War Secretary, replied on behalf of the government, recognising Lady Angela's valuable work and her "zeal and ability". It later transpired that the main accusations against her were that she had used the word "damn!" and had washed her hair in a canteen.

=== Later life ===
After the war, Forbes started a short-lived training scheme for disabled soldiers, then a dress shop, and also tried to run Lord Wemyss's Gosford House as a hotel. In 1921 she published her first book of memoirs, Memories and Base Details. She reverted to her maiden name by deed poll in 1929. After travelling widely, she wrote about her travels in Fore and Aft (1932).

Lady Angela Forbes died on the island of Jersey and was buried at Rosslyn Chapel, Midlothian, on 2 November 1950.

In March 2023, she was one of a number of notable women with a connection to Lincolnshire honoured by South Kesteven District Council.

== Descendants ==
With her husband, who was a grandson of Sir Charles Forbes, 3rd baronet, Forbes had two daughters:

- Marigold Forbes (26 August 1897 – 11 February 1975), who in 1918 married Sir Archibald Sinclair, of Thurso Castle, later leader of the Liberal Party. In 1952 he was created Viscount Thurso. They had four children, including Robin Sinclair, 2nd Viscount Thurso. Her grandson John Thurso remains a member of the House of Lords. Marigold and her husband were also the maternal grandparents of Veronica Linklater, Baroness Linklater of Butterstone.
- Flavia Forbes (18 December 1902 – 13 October 1959), who in 1923 married firstly Lionel Heald; he divorced her in June 1928. She married secondly in 1933 Colonel Lionel Herbert de Pinto (divorced 1938). In 1939 she married thirdly Sir Alexander Hay Seton, 10th Baronet (divorced 1958); with Sir Lionel Heald she had a daughter, Susan Heald and a son Michael Arthur Rufus Heald.

== In popular culture ==
Lady Angela appears as a character in the BBC television production The Monocled Mutineer (1986), played by Penelope Wilton.
