= Francis Fane, 12th Earl of Westmorland =

English Earl (1825–1891)

Colonel The Right Honourable The Earl of Westmorland CB, DL
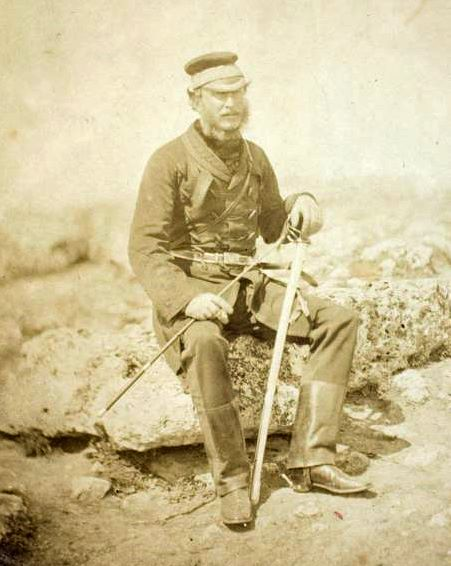
- Fane in 1855
- Born: 19 November 1825
- Died: 3 August 1891 (aged 65)
- Education: Royal Military College, Sandhurst
- Spouse(s): Lady Adelaide Curzon-Howe (m. 1857)
- Children: George Fane, Lord Burghersh; Anthony Fane, 13th Earl of Westmorland; Adelaide Denison, Countess of Londesborough; Lady Margaret Spicer
- Military career
- Allegiance: British
- Branch: Army
- Rank: Colonel
- Conflicts: Battle of Gujrat; Battle of Alma
- Awards: Crimea Medal; Légion d'honneur; Order of Medjidié

Colonel Francis William Henry Fane, 12th Earl of Westmorland CB, DL (19 November 1825 – 3 August 1891), styled Lord Burghersh between 1851 and 1859, was a British Army officer and racehorse owner.

== Background and education ==
Fane was the fourth but eldest surviving son of John Fane, 11th Earl of Westmorland, by Lady Priscilla Anne Pole-Wellesley, daughter of William Wellesley-Pole, 3rd Earl of Mornington. He was educated at Westminster and the Royal Military College, Sandhurst.

== Military career ==
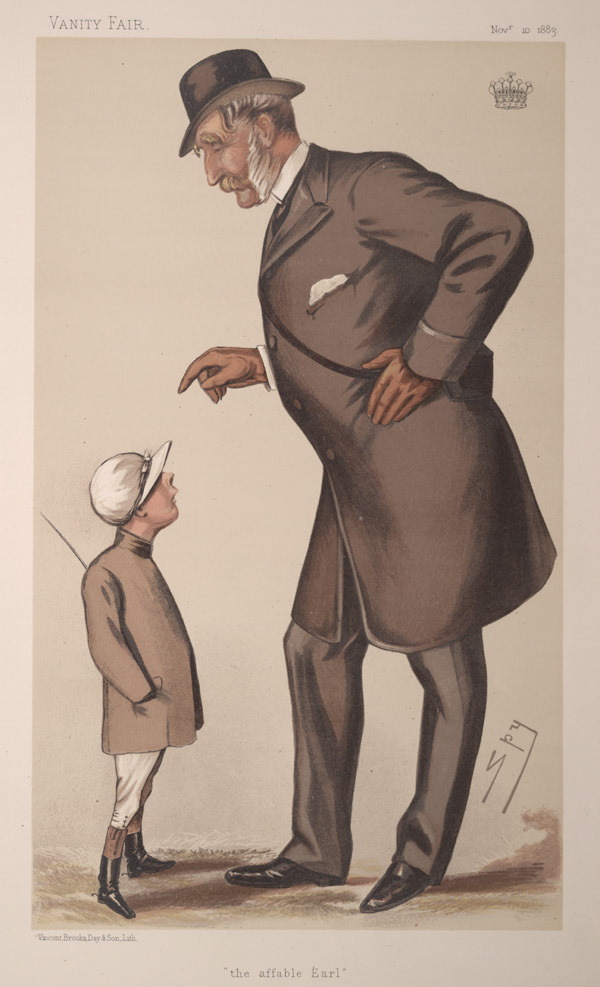
"the affable Earl". Caricature by Spy published in Vanity Fair in 1883.

Lord Burghersh entered the army in 1843. He campaigned in the First Anglo-Sikh War and the Battle of Gujrat during the second war. He also participated in the Crimean War, being awarded the Medjidie and the Légion d'honneur on 30 April 1857, and appointed a Companion of the Order of the Bath (CB) on 10 July 1855.

On 1 August 1848, he was promoted captain and made aide-de-camp to Viscount Hardinge, the governor-general of India. He served under Lord Gough in the following winter, received a medal for bravery at the Battle of Gujrat on 21 February 1849, and obtained his majority on 7 June 1849. At the conclusion of the Sikh war, he returned to England and exchanged into the Coldstream Guards. On the outbreak of the Crimean War, he went out as aide-de-camp to Lord Raglan (his uncle by marriage).

He served with distinction at the Battle of Alma (20 September 1854), bringing home Raglan's despatches. He was appointed brevet lieutenant-colonel on the day of the battle, and lieutenant-colonel on the 12 December following. Subsequently, he was present at Raglan's death on 28 June 1855.

He received the Crimea Medal and the fifth-class Order of Medjidié on 2 March 1858, and in 1856 became aide-de-camp to the Duke of Cambridge.

Following the death of his three brothers, he became heir to the earldom of Westmorland. In 1859 he succeeded his father and, the following year, retired from the army ranked as a colonel.

== Horse racing ==
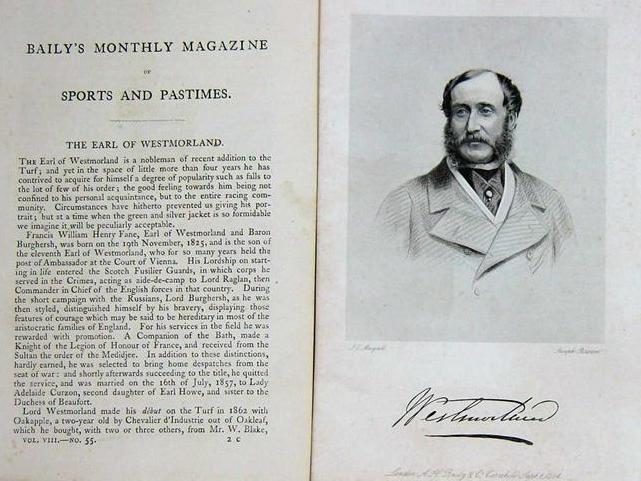
Lord Westmorland's portrait in Baily's monthly magazine

From this time he became a member of the Jockey Club and a racehorse owner, colours green with white braid. His horses never won any of the Classics and he was known to place heavy stakes. In 1866 he sold the family portraits by Joshua Reynolds, Mr Fane and Lord Burghersh. Eventually, his finances forced him to sell his horses and, instead, he managed Lord Hartington's stable.

He died at 34 Brook Street on 3 August 1891, and was buried at Apethorpe, Northamptonshire.

== Family ==
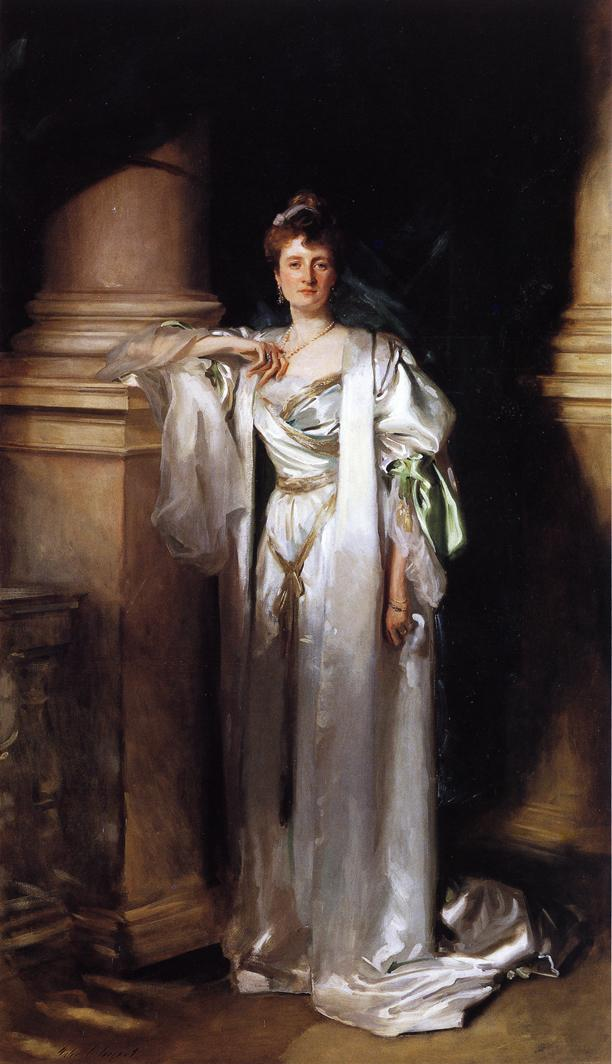
Lady Margaret Spicer, John Singer Sargent, c. 1906

Lord Westmorland married Lady Adelaide Curzon-Howe, daughter of Richard Curzon-Howe, 1st Earl Howe, on 16 July 1857. The Countess of Westmorland died in March 1903. They had four children:

- George Neville John Fane, Lord Burghersh (3 September 1858 – 31 July 1860)
- Anthony Fane, 13th Earl of Westmorland (16 August 1859 – 9 June 1922) he married Lady Sybil St Clair-Erskine on 28 May 1892. They have four children. He married Catherine Louise Geale on 22 April 1916.
- Lady Grace Adelaide Fane (3 October 1860 – 13 June 1933) she married William Denison, 2nd Earl of Londesborough on 11 August 1887. They have three children, two granddaughters, five great-grandchildren and two great-great-granddaughters:
  - Lady Irene Francis Adza Denison, GBE (4 July 1890 – 16 July 1956) she married Alexander Mountbatten, 1st Marquess of Carisbrooke on 19 July 1917. They have one daughter Iris and one grandson.
  - George Francis William Henry Denison, 3rd Earl of Londesborough (17 July 1892 – 12 September 1920)
  - Hugo William Cecil Denison, 4th Earl of Londesborough (13 November 1894 – 17 April 1937) he married Marigold Lubbock on 4 September 1935. They have one daughter, two grandsons and two great-granddaughters:
    - Lady Zinnia Rosemary Denison (25 November 1937 – 13 July 1997) she married Peter Comins on 8 May 1957; they were divorced in 1961. They have one son. She married, secondly, John Leslie-Melville on 14 July 1961 and they were divorced in 1964. She married, thirdly, Major Hugh Cantlie on 26 June 1964 and they were divorced in 1967. They have one son. She married, fourthly, Ralph Pollock on 1 February 1968. She married, fifthly, James Judd in 1982.
      - Timothy Hugo Comins (19 December 1958) he married Jeanie Anne Walford in 1993. They have two daughters:
        - Arabella Zara Comins (1994)
        - Lucy Caroline Comins (1995)
      - Charles Edgar Cantlie (27 February 1965)
- Lady Margaret Mary Fane (30 September 1870 — 22 November 1949) she married Captain John Edmund Philip Spicer on 2 October 1888. They had one son:
  - Anthony Napier Fane Spicer (17 July 1891 — 16 November 1928)

He was succeeded by his second but only surviving son, Anthony, who was forced to sell the family seat, Apethorpe Hall in 1904. The house had been in the family for 300 years.

== Arms ==
Coat of arms of Francis Fane, 12th Earl of Westmorland
Crest Out of a ducal coronet Or, a bull's head Argent pied Sable, armed of the first, charged on the neck with a rose Gules barbed and seeded Proper. Escutcheon Azure three dexter gauntlets backs affrontée Or. Supporters Dexter: a griffin per fesse Argent and Or, gorged with a plain collar and lined Sable; Sinister: a bull Argent pied Sable collared and lined Or, at the end of the line a ring and three staples of the last. Motto "NE VILE FANO" (Disgrace not the altar)

Peerage of England
Preceded by John Fane	Earl of Westmorland; 1859–1891	Succeeded by Anthony Mildmay Julian Fane
