= David Fane, 15th Earl of Westmorland =

English peer (1924–1993)

The Right Honourable David Fane
- Earl of Westmorland
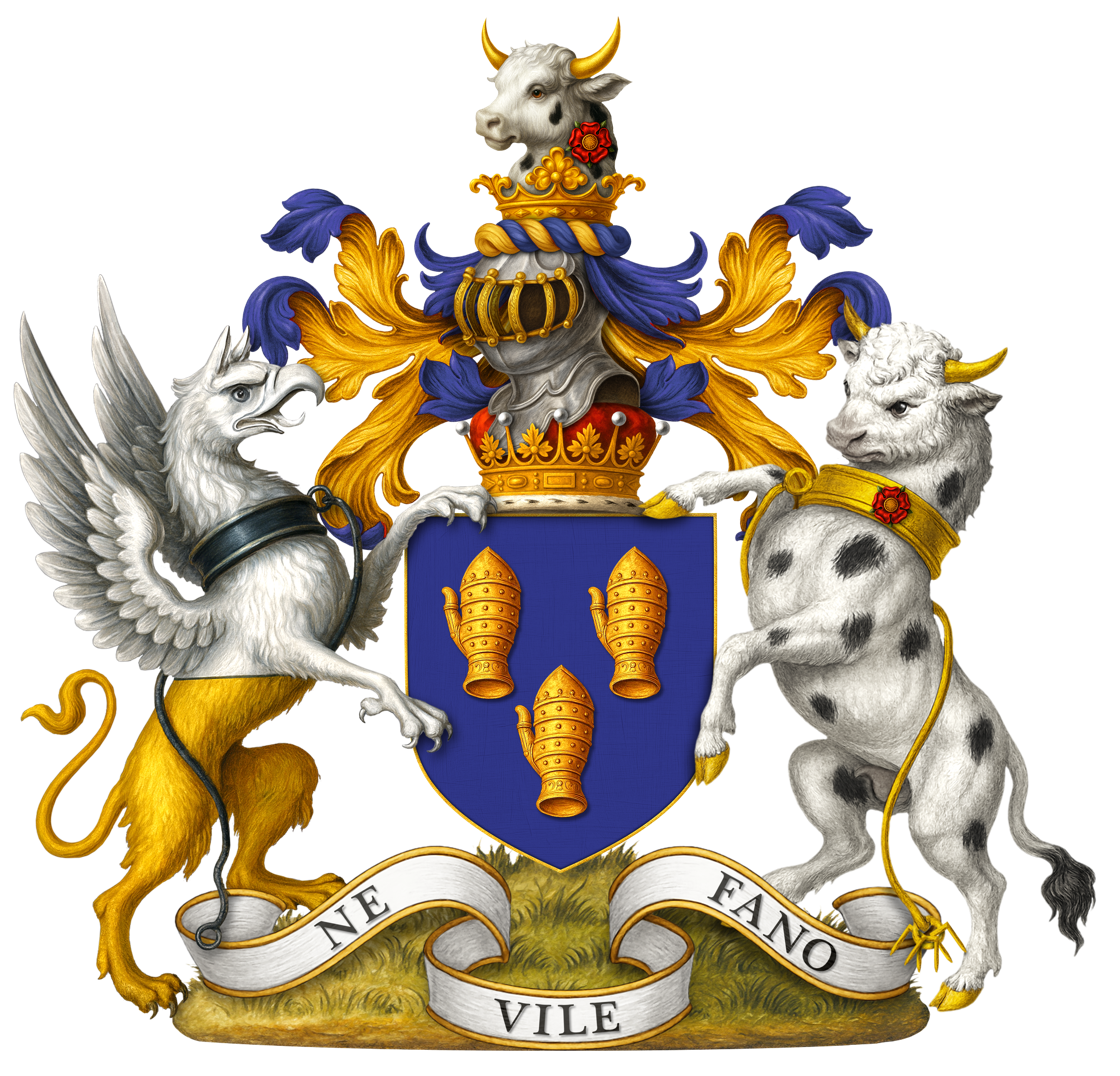
- Coat of arms
- Tenure: 1948–1993
- Predecessor: Vere Fane, 14th Earl of Westmorland
- Successor: Anthony Fane, 16th Earl of Westmorland
- Born: 31 March 1924
- Died: 8 September 1993 (aged 69)
- Spouse: Jane Findlay (m. 1950)
- Issue: Anthony Fane, 16th Earl of Westmorland; Hon. Harry Fane; Lady Camilla Fane
- Father: Vere Fane, 14th Earl of Westmorland
- Mother: Hon. Diana Lister

David Anthony Thomas Fane, 15th Earl of Westmorland, GCVO, DL (31 March 1924 – 8 September 1993), styled Lord Burghersh until 1948, was a British courtier, landowner and member of the House of Lords.

== Early life and military service ==
The elder son of Vere Fane, 14th Earl of Westmorland, by The Hon. Diana, daughter of Thomas Lister, 4th Baron Ribblesdale, he was accorded the courtesy title of Lord Burghersh from birth; his younger brother was the author The Hon. Julian Fane, FRSL (1927-2009).

Educated at Eton, he served as a Lieutenant in the Royal Horse Guards during the Second World War when he was wounded (MiD).

== Later career and family ==
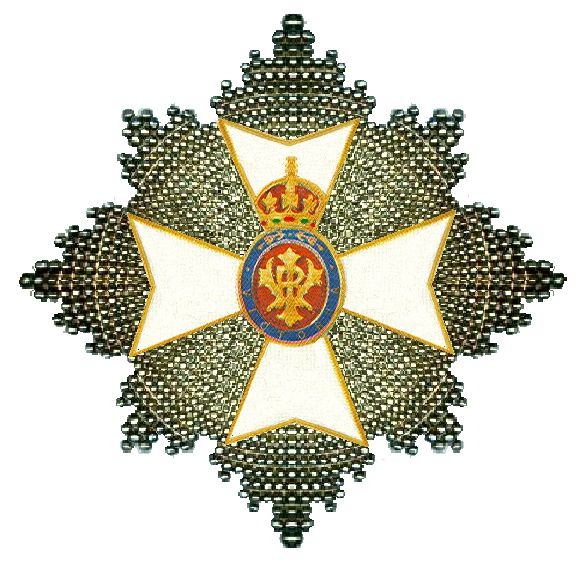

In 1948 he succeeded in his father's earldom on the death of his father, becoming a Lord-in-waiting to Queen Elizabeth II between 1955 and 1978 and again between 1990 and 1993; he then served as Master of the Horse from 1978 to 1991. He was appointed a Knight Commander of the Royal Victorian Order (KCVO) in 1970 and promoted Knight Grand Cross of the Royal Victorian Order (GCVO) in 1991. The latter year he was also appointed a Deputy Lieutenant of Gloucestershire. Lord Westmorland was also a Commander of the Order of St John (CStJ).

He married Jane Barbara Findlay, daughter of Sir Roland Findlay Bt, on 20 June 1950; they had three children:

- Anthony David Francis Henry Fane, 16th Earl of Westmorland (b. 1 August 1951)
- The Hon. Harry St. Clair Fane (19 March 1953 – 15 December 2023), an expert in Cartier jewellery. His son Sam (b. 1989) is the heir presumptive to the earldom.
- Lady Camilla Diana Fane (b. 26 December 1957)

Lord Westmorland died on 8 September 1993, aged 69, being succeeded in the earldom by his elder son, Anthony (previously Lord Burghersh).

He was a godfather to Lady Sarah Chatto, daughter of Princess Margaret and Antony Armstrong-Jones, 1st Earl of Snowdon.

== Arms ==
Coat of arms of David Fane, 15th Earl of Westmorland
Crest Out of a ducal coronet Or, a bull's head Argent pied Sable, armed of the first, charged on the neck with a rose Gules barbed and seeded Proper. Escutcheon Azure three dexter gauntlets backs affrontée Or. Supporters Dexter: a griffin per fesse Argent and Or, gorged with a plain collar and lined Sable; Sinister: a bull Argent pied Sable collared and lined Or, at the end of the line a ring and three staples of the last. Motto "NE VILE FANO" (Disgrace not the altar)

== See also ==
- House of Lords
- Master of the Horse

Court offices
Preceded by The Duke of Beaufort	Master of the Horse; 1978–1991	Succeeded by The Lord Somerleyton
Peerage of England
Preceded by Vere Fane	Earl of Westmorland; 1948–1993	Succeeded by Anthony Fane
