= Anthony Fane, 16th Earl of Westmorland =

British peer

The Right Honourable The Earl of Westmorland FRGS
- Born: Anthony David Francis Henry Fane; 1 August 1951 (age 75)
- Spouse: Caroline Fairey (m. 1985)
- Issue: Daisy Caroline Fane
- Parents: David Fane, 15th Earl of Westmorland; Barbara Jane Findlay

Anthony David Francis Henry Fane, 16th Earl of Westmorland FRGS (born 1 August 1951), styled Lord Burghersh until 1993 (and nicknamed Burghie), is a British peer and outdoorsman. He was a member of the House of Lords from 1993 to 1999.

== Early life ==
The eldest son of David Fane, 15th Earl of Westmorland and his wife Barbara Jane, he was educated at Eton College and then in Spain.

== Career ==
He was a director of Phillips the Auctioneers from 1994 until 2002 and then of Bonhams until 2003. In that year he joined Piers Watson to found Watson Westmorland, an independent art appraisal firm.

Westmorland is a Fellow of the Royal Geographical Society, life president of the St Moritz Sporting Club, and was a member of the Orbitex North Pole research expedition in 1990.

== Personal life ==
In 1985, he married Caroline Fairey, by whom he has one daughter, Lady Daisy Caroline Fane (born 18 January 1989).

The heir presumptive to the earldom is Sam Michael David Fane (born 1989) better known as automotive themed content creator Seen Through Glass, the son of the 16th Earl's brother, Harry St. Clair Fane (1953–2023).

== Arms ==
Coat of arms of Anthony Fane, 16th Earl of Westmorland
Crest Out of a ducal coronet Or, a bull's head Argent pied Sable, armed of the first, charged on the neck with a rose Gules barbed and seeded Proper. Escutcheon Azure three dexter gauntlets backs affrontée Or. Supporters Dexter: a griffin per fesse Argent and Or, gorged with a plain collar and lined Sable; Sinister: a bull Argent pied Sable collared and lined Or, at the end of the line a ring and three staples of the last. Motto "NE VILE FANO" (Disgrace not the altar)

Peerage of England
Preceded by David Fane	Earl of Westmorland; 1993–present	Incumbent; Heir presumptive: Sam Fane
