= Anthony Fane, 13th Earl of Westmorland =

British peer (1859–1922)

Lieutenant-Colonel The Right Honourable The Earl of Westmorland CBE, JP
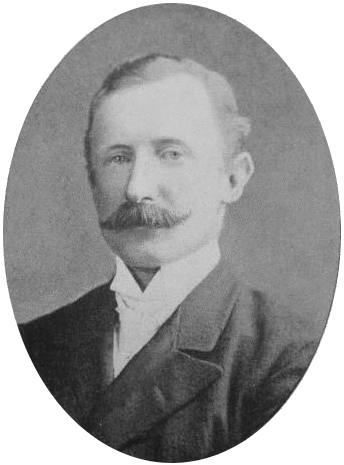
- The Earl of Westmorland in 1893.

Personal details
- Born: Hon. Anthony Mildmay Julian Fane; 16 August 1859 Mayfair, London, England
- Died: 9 June 1922 (aged 62) Hove, Sussex, England
- Spouses: Lady Sybil St Clair-Erskine (m. 1892; died 1910) Catherine Louise Geale (m. 1916)
- Children: Vere Fane, 14th Earl of Westmorland; Lady Enid Turnor; Hon. Mountjoy Fane; Lady Gloria Fane
- Parents: Francis Fane, 12th Earl of Westmorland; Lady Adelaide Curzon-Howe

Military service
- Allegiance: United Kingdom
- Branch/service: British Army
- Rank: Lieutenant-Colonel
- Unit: Northampton and Rutland Militia; Lancashire Fusiliers
- Battles/wars: Second Boer War; World War I

Lieutenant-Colonel Anthony Mildmay Julian Fane, 13th Earl of Westmorland, CBE, JP (16 August 1859 – 9 June 1922), styled Lord Burghersh between October 1859 and 1891, was a British peer.

== Background and education ==
Fane was born at Curzon House, 8 South Audley Street, Mayfair, London, the second and youngest son of Francis Fane, 12th Earl of Westmorland and Lady Adelaide Ida, daughter of Richard Curzon-Howe, 1st Earl Howe. He was baptised at Apethorpe, Northampton. He was educated at Eton. He was fond of cricket, and although not in the Eleven whilst at Eton, he occasionally played for Northamptonshire under his title Lord Burghersh. On 3 August 1891, he succeeded his father in the earldom.

== Military career ==
Lord Westmorland was appointed a major in the 3rd (Northampton and Rutland Militia) Battalion, Northamptonshire Regiment, on 7 March 1900. He accompanied the battalion when they were posted to South Africa in April 1902 for the last stages of the Second Boer War. Following the end of the war in June 1902, Lord Westmorland and the other men of the 3rd battalion left Cape Town on the SS Scot in early September, and returned to Northampton after arrival in the United Kingdom later the same month. He was promoted to Lieutenant-Colonel and commanded the battalion from 31 July 1907, including its transition to the Special Reserve in 1908. In 1911 he was appointed an Aide-de-Camp to King George V. He retired from the command on 31 July 1914, but as World War I broke out days later he was 'dug out' of retirement and commanded 3rd (Reserve) Battalion, Lancashire Fusiliers from 8 December 1915 until the end of the war. He was made a Commander of the Order of the British Empire (CBE) in 1919. He was also Justice of the Peace for Northamptonshire.

== Family ==
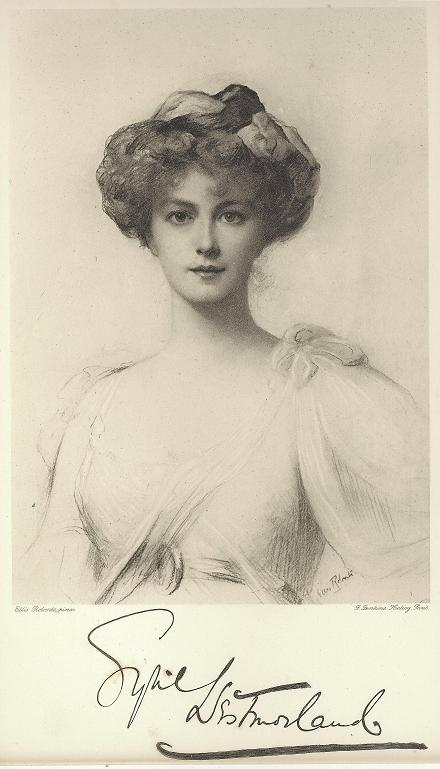
Fane's first wife – Sybil Fane, Countess of Westmorland, circa 1900

On 28 May 1892, Lord Westmorland married his first wife Lady Sybil Mary St.Clair-Erskine, the daughter of Robert St Clair-Erskine, 4th Earl of Rosslyn and Blanche Adeliza Fitzroy. The wedding took place at St. Michael's Church, Chester Square, Belgravia, London. The countess was renowned for her beauty, and was connected with the group known as The Souls. She died on 21 July 1910 aged 38.

The couple had the following children:

- Lieutenant-Commander Vere Anthony Francis St.Clair Fane, 14th Earl of Westmorland (15 March 1893 – 12 May 1948) he married Hon. Diana Lister (daughter of Thomas Lister, 4th Baron Ribblesdale) on 7 June 1923. They have three children.
- Lady Enid Victoria Rachel Fane (24 April 1894 – 9 September 1969) married Major The Honorable Henry Cecil Vane on 25 August 1914. She remarried Major Herbert Turnor on 1 September 1922. They had two daughters, Rosemary Sybil (9 September 1924 – 21 September 2015) and Pamela (born 22 May 1926) and through Rosemary, Enid was the maternal grandmother of Neil McCorquodale, husband of Lady Sarah Spencer (the elder sister of Diana, Princess of Wales).
- Major the Hon. Mountjoy John Charles Wedderburn Fane (8 October 1900 – 9 October 1963), who married Agatha Acland-Hood-Reynardson on 29 April 1926. They had two children, Lt.-Cdr. Antony Charles Reynardson Fane (born 11 October 1927) and Daphne Sybil Fane (25 March 1929 – 23 January 2005).
- Lady (Violet) Gloria Sybil Fane (11 April 1902 – 9 September 1969)

Due to financial difficulties, he sold the family seat, Apethorpe Hall, in 1904. It had been in his family for 300 years.

After the death of his first wife, Lord Westmorland married Catherine Louise Geale on 22 April 1916. The wedding took place at Herne Bay in Kent. Catherine was the daughter of Reverend John Samuel Geale, and later a supporter of the British Fascists.

He died in Hove, Sussex on 9 June 1922, and was buried there on 14 June.

== Arms ==
Coat of arms of Anthony Fane, 13th Earl of Westmorland
| Crest Out of a ducal coronet Or, a bull's head Argent pied Sable, armed of the first, charged on the neck with a rose Gules barbed and seeded Proper. Escutcheon Azure three dexter gauntlets backs affrontée Or. Supporters Dexter: a griffin per fesse Argent and Or, gorged with a plain collar and lined Sable; Sinister: a bull Argent pied Sable collared and lined Or, at the end of the line a ring and three staples of the last. Motto "NE VILE FANO" (Disgrace not the altar) |

Peerage of England
| Preceded by Francis William Henry Fane | Earl of Westmorland; 1891–1922 | Succeeded by Vere Anthony Francis St Clair Fane |
