= Earl of Westmorland =

Title in the peerage of England

Earldom of Westmorland
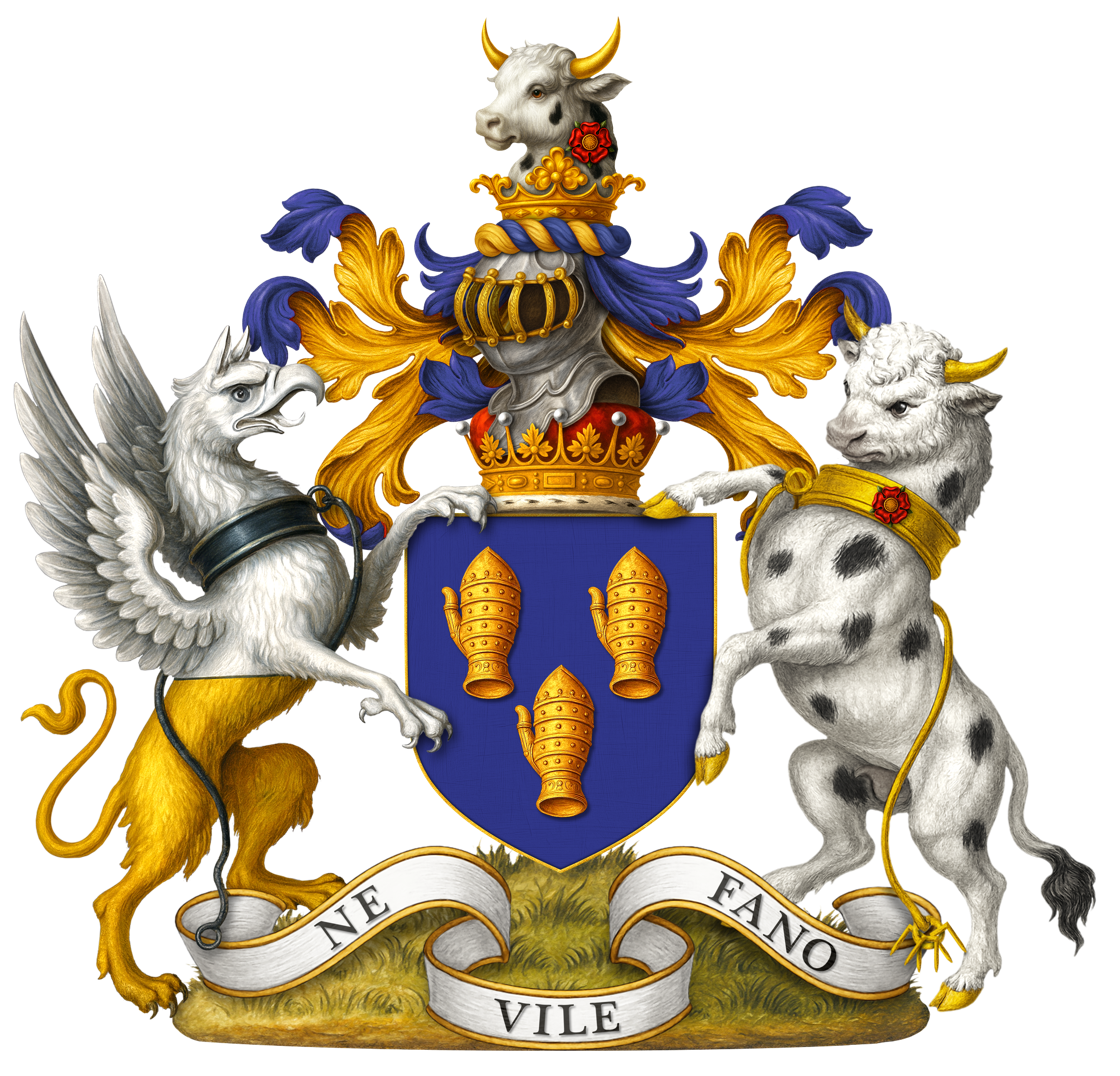
- Arms of Fane, Earls of Westmorland; Arms: Azure, three dexter gauntlets back affrontée Or. Crest: Out of a Ducal Coronet Or, a Bull's Head of Brindled colour, armed Or, charged on the neck with a Rose Gules. Supporters: Dexter: a Griffin per fess Argent and Or, collared and line reflexed over the back Sable. Sinister: a Pied or Brindled Bull, collared and line terminating in a Ring and three Staples Or.
- Creation date: 1397 (first creation); 1624 (second creation)
- Created by: Richard II (first creation); James I (second creation)
- Peerage: Peerage of England
- First holder: Ralph Neville (first creation); Sir Francis Fane (second creation)
- Last holder: Charles Neville, 6th Earl of Westmorland (first creation)
- Present holder: Anthony Fane, 16th Earl of Westmorland
- Heir presumptive: Sam Michael David Fane
- Remainder to: The 1st Earl's heirs male of the body lawfully begotten
- Subsidiary titles: Baron Burghersh
- Extinction date: 1571 (first creation)
- Former seats: Raby Castle (now seat of the Barons Barnard); Apethorpe Palace; Mereworth Castle
- Motto: Ne Vile Fano ("Disgrace not the altar"; Fane); Ne vile velis ("Form no mean wish"; Neville)

Earl of Westmorland is a title that has been created twice in the Peerage of England. The title was first created in 1397 for Ralph Neville. It was forfeited in 1571 by Charles Neville, 6th Earl of Westmorland, for leading the Rising of the North. It was revived in 1624 in favour of Sir Francis Fane, whose mother, Mary Neville, was a descendant of a younger son of the first Earl. The first Earl of the first creation had already become Baron Neville de Raby, and that was a subsidiary title for his successors. The current Earl holds the subsidiary title Baron Burghersh (1624).

== 1397 creation ==
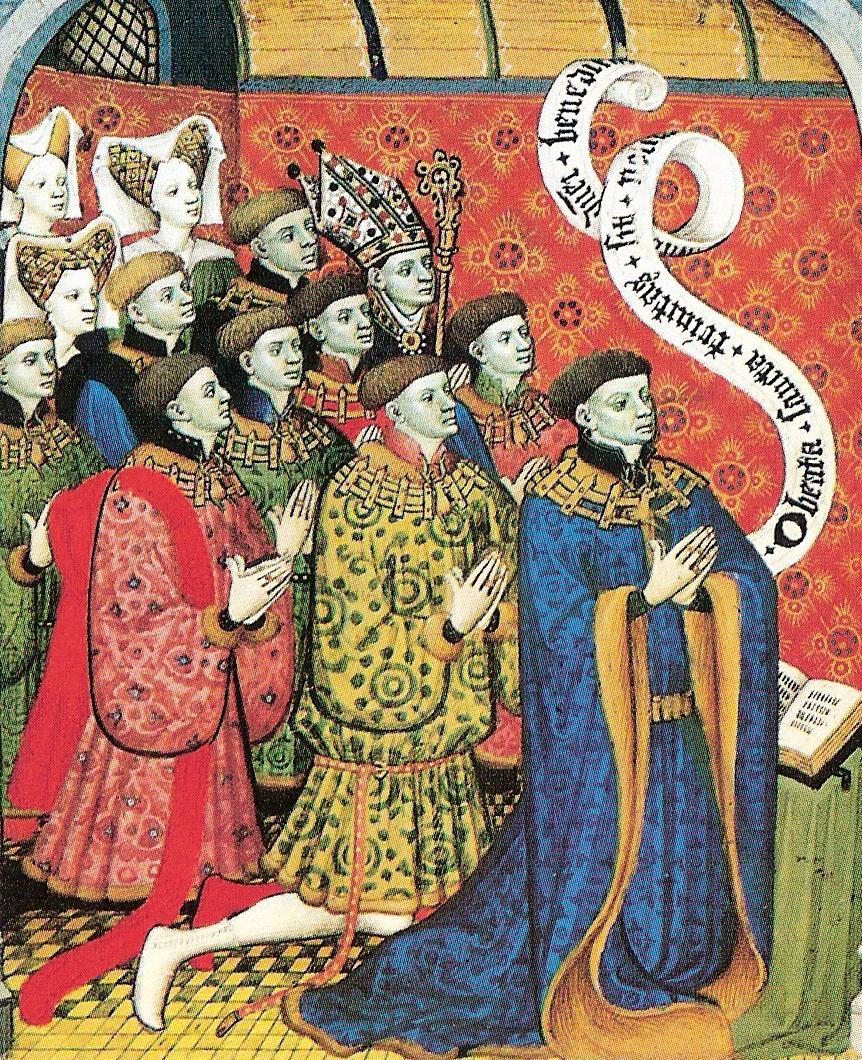
Ralph Neville, 1st Earl of Westmorland, and his twelve children.

Ralph Neville, 4th Baron Neville of Raby, and 1st earl of Westmorland (1364–1425), eldest son of John, 3rd Baron Neville, and his wife Maud Percy (see Neville, Family), was knighted by Thomas of Woodstock, afterwards duke of Gloucester, during the French expedition of 1380, and succeeded to his father's barony in 1388. He had been joint warden of the west march in 1386, and was reappointed for a new term in 1390. In 1391 he was put on the commission which undertook the duties of constable in place of the duke of Gloucester, and he was repeatedly engaged in negotiations with the Scots. His support of the court party against the lords appellant was rewarded in 1397 by the earldom of Westmorland.

Westmorland married as his second wife Joan Beaufort, half-sister of Henry of Lancaster, afterwards Henry IV, whom he joined on his landing in Yorkshire in 1399. He already held the castles of Brancepeth, Raby, Middleham and Sheriff Hutton when he received from Henry IV the honour and lordship of Richmond for life. The only rivals of the Nevilles in the north were the Percies, whose power was broken at Shrewsbury in 1403. Both marches had been in their hands, but the wardenship of the west marches was now assigned to Westmorland, whose influence was also paramount in the east, which was under the nominal wardenship of the young Prince John, afterwards duke of Bedford. Westmorland had prevented Northumberland from marching to reinforce Hotspur in 1403, and before embarking on a new revolt he sought to secure his enemy, surrounding, but too late, one of Sir Ralph Eure's castles where the earl had been staying. In May the Percies were in revolt, with the Earl Marshal, Thomas, 4th Earl of Norfolk, and Richard le Scrope, Archbishop of York. Westmorland met them on Shipton Moor, near York, on 29 May 1405, and suggested a parley between the leaders. By pretending accord with the archbishop, the earl induced him to allow his followers to disperse. Scrope and Mowbray were then seized and handed over to Henry at Pontefract on 3 January. The improbabilities of this narrative have led some writers to think, in face of contemporary authorities, that Scrope and Mowbray must have surrendered voluntarily. If Westmorland betrayed them he at least had no share in their execution.

Thenceforward Westmorland was busily engaged in negotiating with the Scots and keeping the peace on the borders. He did not play the part assigned to him by Shakespeare in Henry V., for during Henry's absence he remained in charge of the north, and was a member of Bedford's council. He consolidated the strength of his family through marriage alliances. His daughter Catherine married in 1412 John, 2nd Duke of Norfolk, brother and heir of the Earl Marshal, who had been executed after Shipton Moor; Anne married Humphrey, 1st Duke of Buckingham; Eleanor married, after the death of her first husband Richard le Despenser, Henry Percy, 2nd Earl of Northumberland; Cecily married Richard, 3rd Duke of York, and was the mother of Kings Edward IV and Richard III. The sons by his second marriage were Richard, 5th Earl of Salisbury, William, Baron Fauconberg, George, Baron Latimer, Robert, bishop of Salisbury and then of Durham, and Edward, Baron Abergavenny. The earl died on 21 October 1425, and a fine alabaster tomb was erected to his memory in Staindrop church close by Raby Castle.

Ralph Neville, 2nd Earl of Westmorland (c. 1404–1484), the son of John, Lord Neville (died 1423), succeeded his grandfather in 1425, and married as his first wife Elizabeth Percy, dowager Baroness Clifford, the daughter of Sir Henry "Hotspur" Percy, thus forming further bonds with the Percies. The 3rd Earl, Ralph Neville (1456–1499), was his nephew, and the son of John Neville, Lord Neville, who was slain at the Battle of Towton. His grandson Ralph Neville, 4th Earl of Westmorland (1499–1550), was an energetic border warrior, who remained faithful to the royal cause when the other great northern lords joined the Pilgrimage of Grace. He was succeeded by his son Henry, 5th Earl (c. 1525–1563).

Charles Neville, 6th Earl (1543–1601), eldest son of the 5th earl by his first wife Anne, daughter of Thomas Manners, 1st Earl of Rutland, was brought up a Roman Catholic, and was further attached to the Catholic party by his marriage with Jane, daughter of Henry Howard, Earl of Surrey. He was a member of the council of the north in 1569 when he joined Thomas Percy, 7th Earl of Northumberland, and his uncle Christopher Neville, in the Catholic Rising of the North, which had as its object the liberation of Mary, Queen of Scots. On the collapse of the ill-organised insurrection, Westmorland fled with his brother earl over the borders, and eventually to the Spanish Netherlands, where he lived in receipt of a pension from Philip II of Spain, until his death on 16 November 1601. He left no sons, and his honours were forfeited by his formal attainder in 1571. Raby Castle remained in the hands of the crown until 1645.

During the reign of James I, the earldom was claimed by Edward Neville, a descendant of George Neville, 1st Baron Latymer. Though the claimant was recognised as the heir-male of the first Earl of Westmorland, his claim was not admitted due to the attainder.

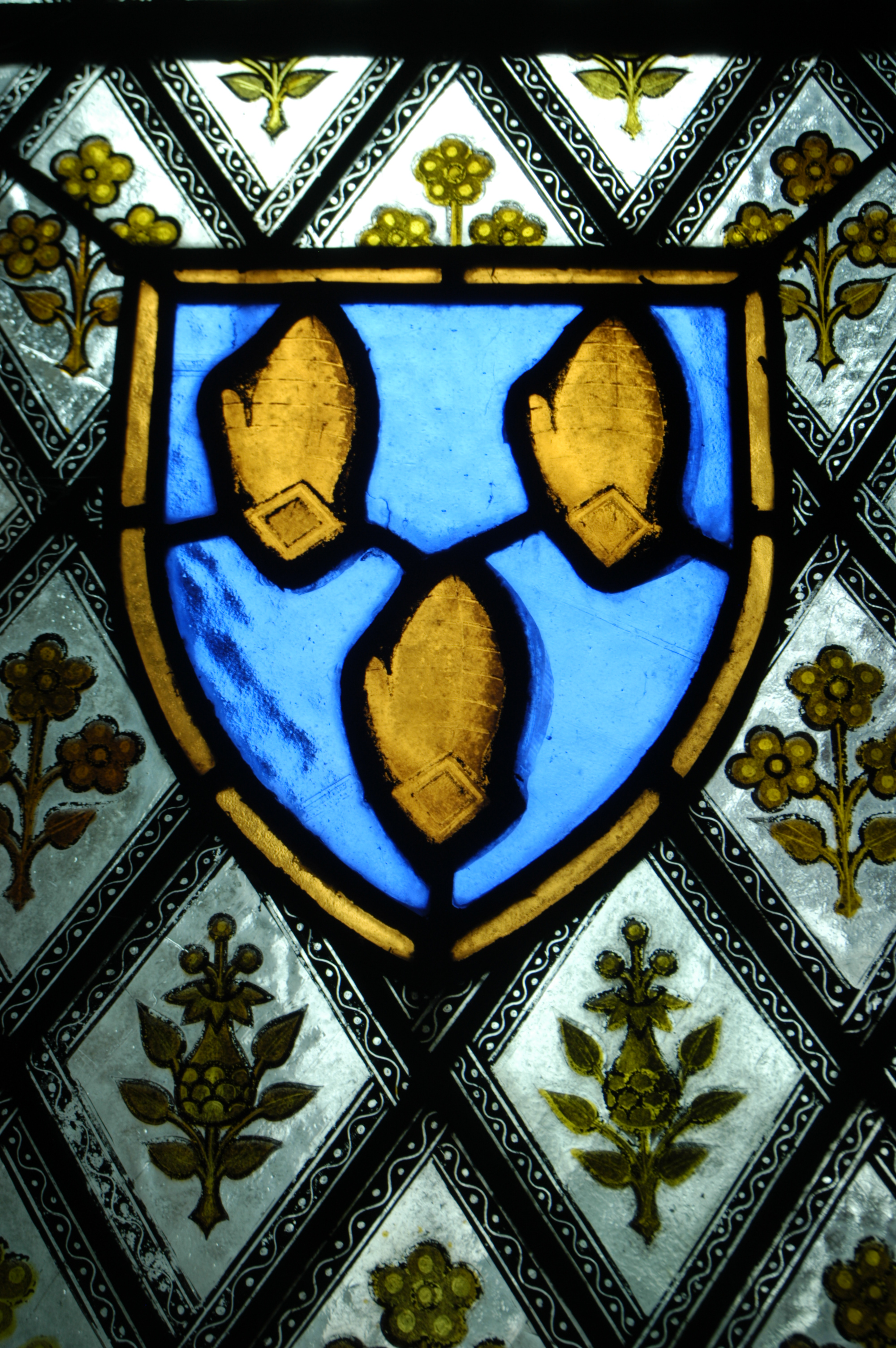
_{Fane shield in Fulbeck.}

He died about 1640. "There was issue male existing long after the 17th century from the 1st Lord Latimer of this creation. That from Thomas Nevill, of Pigotts Ardley, co. Essex (who d. 1550 and who was next yr. br. to William Nevill abovenamed and to John, the 3d Lord Latimer), ancestor of the Nevills, of Halstead, in that county, is said to have existed for eight generations in Drummond's "Noble British Families"" See also

== 1624 creation ==
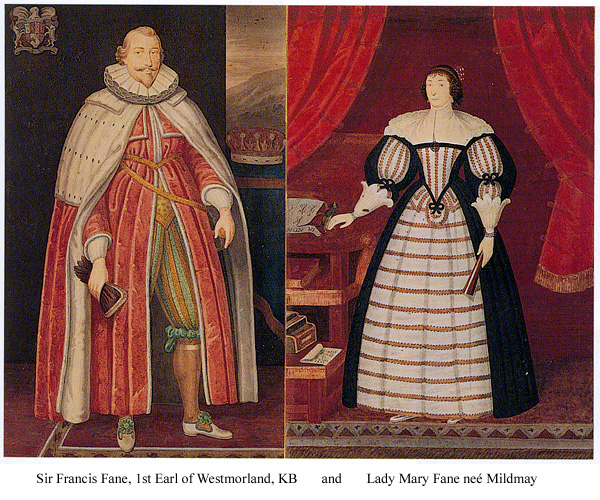
Francis Fane, 1st Earl of Westmorland, with his wife Mary Mildmay.

The title was revived in 1624 in favour of Sir Francis Fane, whose mother, Mary Neville, was a descendant of a younger son of the first Earl of the 1397 creation. He was created Baron Burghersh, in the County of Sussex, and Earl of Westmorland in the Peerage of England 1624, and became Baron le Despencer on his mother's death in 1626. His son Mildmay Fane, 2nd Earl of Westmorland, at first sided with the king's party in the English Civil War, but was afterwards reconciled with the parliament. John Fane, 7th Earl of Westmorland, served under the Duke of Marlborough, and was made in 1739 lieutenant-general of the British Armies.

John Fane, 11th Earl of Westmorland, only son of John Fane, 10th Earl of Westmorland, entered the army in 1803, and in 1805 took part in the Hanoverian campaign as aide-de-camp to General Sir George Don. He was assistant adjutant-general in Sicily and Egypt (1806–1807), served in the Peninsular War from 1808 to 1813, was British military commissioner to the allied armies under the Prince of Schwarzenberg, and marched with the allies to Paris in 1814. He was subsequently promoted major general (1825), lieutenant-general (1838) and general (1854), although the latter half of his life was given to the diplomatic service. He was a British resident in Florence from 1814 to 1830, and British ambassador at Berlin from 1841 to 1851, when he was transferred to Vienna. In Berlin, he had mediated in the Schleswig-Holstein question, and in Vienna, he was one of the British plenipotentiaries at the congress of 1855. He retired in 1855, and died at Apethorpe Hall, Northamptonshire, on 16 October 1859. Himself a musician of considerable reputation and the composer of several operas, he took a keen interest in the cause of music in England, and in 1822 made proposals which led to the foundation in the next year of the Royal Academy of Music. His wife Priscilla Anne, daughter of William Wellesley-Pole, 3rd Earl of Mornington, was a distinguished artist.

His published works include Memoirs of the Early Campaigns of the Duke of Wellington in Portugal and Spain (1820), and Memoir of the Operations of the Allied Armies under Prince Schwarzenberg and Marshal Blucher (1822).

Francis Fane, 12th Earl of Westmorland, fourth son of the preceding, was also a distinguished soldier. He entered the army in 1843 and served through the Punjab campaign of 1846; was made aide-de-camp to the governor-general in 1848, and distinguished himself at the Battle of Gujrat on 21 February 1849. He went to the Crimean War as aide-de-camp to Lord Raglan, and was promoted lieutenant colonel in 1855. On his return to England, he became aide-de-camp to the duke of Cambridge, and received the Crimean Medal. The death of his elder brother in 1851 gave him the style of Lord Burghersh, and after his accession to the earldom in 1859, he retired from the service with the rank of colonel. He died in August 1891 and was succeeded by his son, Anthony Fane, 13th Earl of Westmorland.

== Earls of Westmorland; First creation (1397) ==
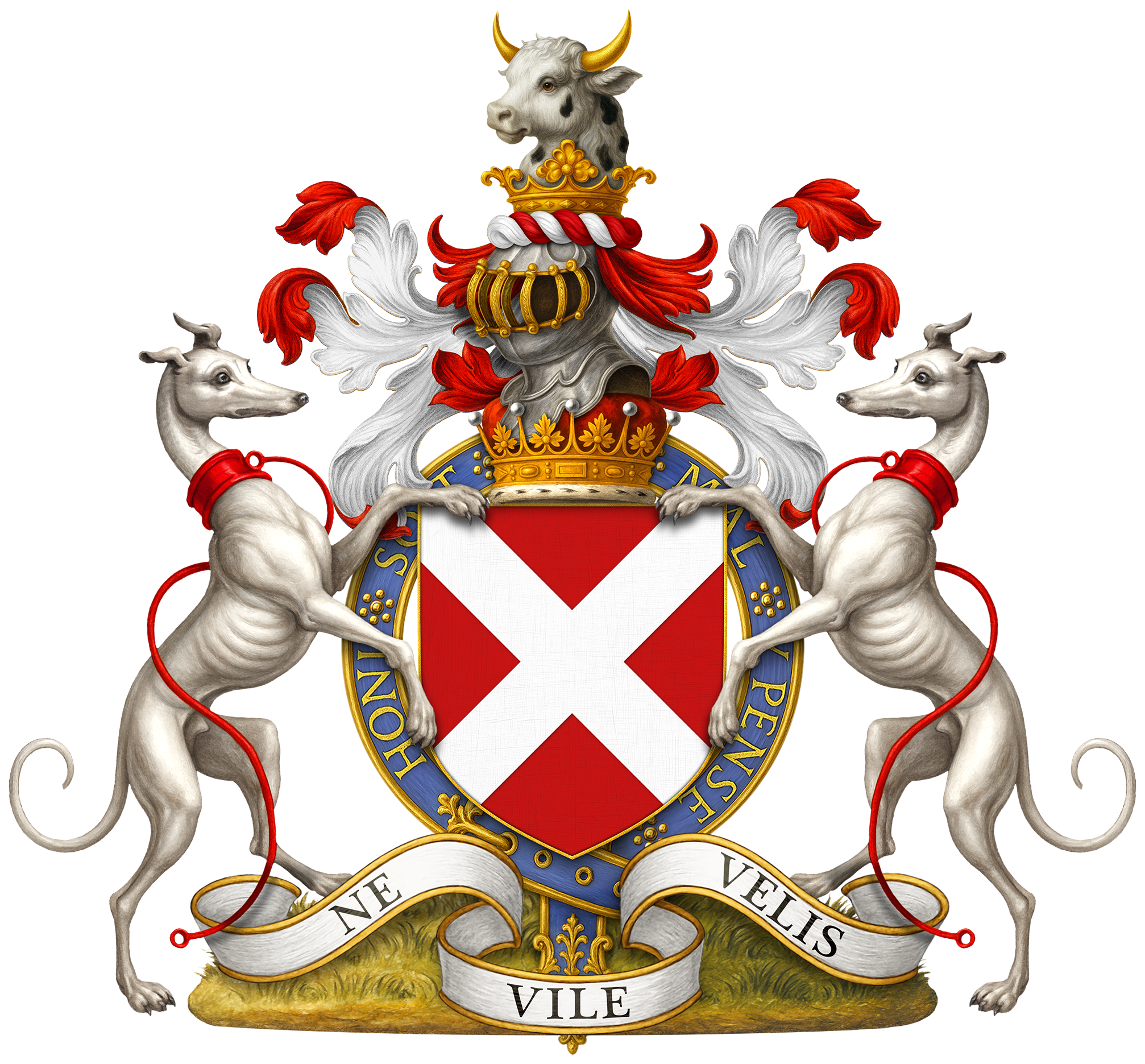
Arms of Ralph Neville, 1st Earl of Westmorland, KG: Gules, a saltire Argent

- Ralph Neville, 1st Earl of Westmorland, KG PC (c. 1364–1425)
- Ralph Neville, 2nd Earl of Westmorland (1408–1484)
- Ralph Neville, 3rd Earl of Westmorland (1456–1499)
- Ralph Neville, 4th Earl of Westmorland (1497–1549)
- Henry Neville, 5th Earl of Westmorland (1525–1564)
- Charles Neville, 6th Earl of Westmorland (1542–1601) (forfeit 1571)

== Earls of Westmorland; Second creation (1624) ==
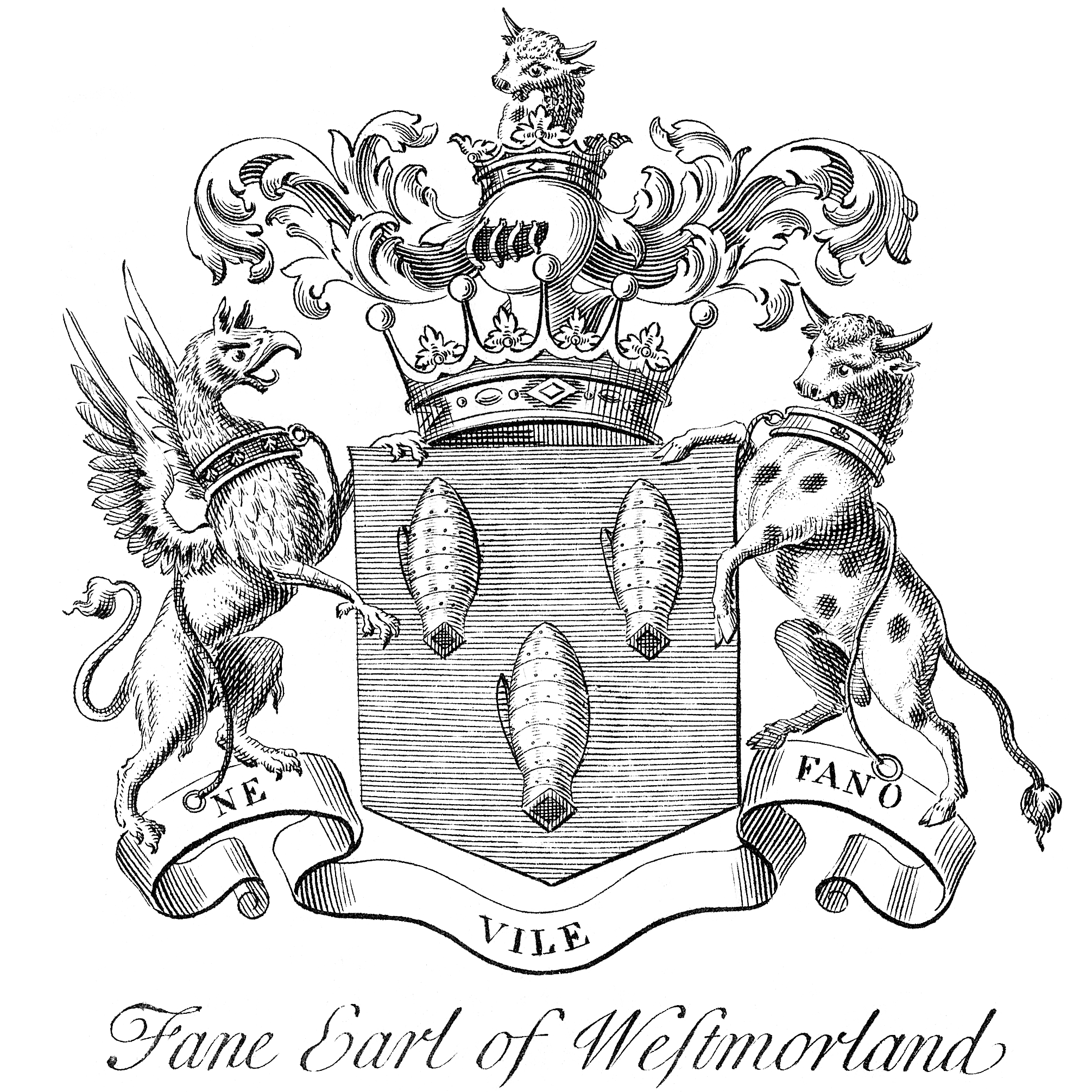
Heraldic achievement of Fane family, Earls of Westmorland. Latin motto: Ne Vile Fano, generally rendered in English as "Disgrace not the altar"; literally translated: "Do not (put something) cheap in the temple". The motto is a play on the names Nevile and Fane, with which former family the crest of a bull's head is shared. The ancient motto of Neville is: Ne vile velis, "form no mean wish", literally: "do not wish for (something) cheap"

- Francis Fane, 1st Earl of Westmorland (1580–1629)
- Mildmay Fane, 2nd Earl of Westmorland (1602–1666)
- Charles Fane, 3rd Earl of Westmorland (1635–1691)
- Vere Fane, 4th Earl of Westmorland (1645–1693)
  - John Fane (1676–1678)
- Vere Fane, 5th Earl of Westmorland (1678–1699)
- Thomas Fane, 6th Earl of Westmorland (1683–1736)
- John Fane, 7th Earl of Westmorland (1685–1762)
- Thomas Fane, 8th Earl of Westmorland (1701–1771)
- John Fane, 9th Earl of Westmorland (1728–1774)
- John Fane, 10th Earl of Westmorland (1759–1841)
- John Fane, 11th Earl of Westmorland (1784–1859)
  - John Arthur Fane (1816–1816)
  - George Augustus Frederick John Fane, Lord Burghersh (1819–1848)
  - Ernest Fitzroy Neville Fane, Lord Burghersh (1824–1851)
- Francis William Henry Fane, 12th Earl of Westmorland (1825–1891)
  - George Neville John Fane, Lord Burghersh (1858–1860)
- Anthony Mildmay Julian Fane, 13th Earl of Westmorland (1859–1922)
- Vere Anthony Francis Fane, 14th Earl of Westmorland (1893–1948)
- David Anthony Thomas Fane, 15th Earl of Westmorland (1924–1993)
- Anthony David Francis Henry Fane, 16th Earl of Westmorland (born 1951)

The heir presumptive is the present holder's nephew, Sam Michael David Fane (born 1989).

== Family tree ==
House of Neville family tree, including Earls of Westmorland, Earls of Abergavenny, Marquesses of Abergavenny, and many creations of the Barons Bergavenny

Uhtred
Dolfin d. aft. 1129	Gilbert de Neville d.1166/9 1st baron of Ashby
Maldred	Geoffrey de Neville d. 1193; 2nd baron of Ashby	Renata de Bulmer
Robert FitzMaldred c. 1150; Lord of Raby	Isabel de Neville
Geoffrey FitzRobert de Neville b. c. 1197–c. 1242; 1st Baron Nevill of Raby
Robert de Neville c. 1223–1282; 2nd Baron Nevill of Raby
Robert de Neville d. bef. 1282
Baron Neville of Raby (1st creation by writ), 1295
Ralph Neville; 1262–c. 1331; 3rd/1st Baron Neville de Raby
King Edward III; 1312–1377	Ralph Neville c. 1291–1367; 4th/2nd Baron Neville de Raby	Thomas Beauchamp c. 1313–1369; Earl of Warwick
Baron Bergavenny (1st creation), 1392
John of Gaunt; 1340–1377; Duke of Lancaster	John Neville; 5th/3rd Baron Neville de Raby c. 1337–1388	Alexander Neville c. 1340–1392; Archbishop of York	William Beauchamp c. 1343 – 1411; 1st Baron Bergavenny
Earl of Westmorland (1st creation), 1397
King Henry IV; 1367–1413	Joan Beaufort c. 1379–1440	Ralph Neville c. 1364–1425; 1st Earl of Westmorland; 6th/4th Baron Neville de Raby	John Neville c. 1382–1430; 6th Baron Latimer
King Henry V 1386–1422	John Neville c. 1387–1420	Richard Beauchamp c. 1394 – 1421/1422; Earl of Worcester, 2nd Baron Bergavenny
Baron Neville, 1459	Baron Latimer of Snape, 1432	Baron Bergavenny (2nd creation), 1450
Ralph Neville; 1406–1484; 2nd Earl of Westmorland; 7th/5th Baron Neville de Raby	John Neville c. 1410–1461; 1st Baron Neville (1459)	Richard Neville; 1400–1460; Earl of Salisbury	Alice Montacute; 1407–1462; Countess of Salisbury, Baroness Monthermer, 7th/Baroness Montagu	Robert Neville; 1404–1457; Bishop	Cecily Neville; 1415–1495	Richard of York; 1411–1460; Duke of York	William Neville c. 1405–1463; Earl of Kent	George Neville c. 1407–1469; 1st Baron Latimer of Snape	Edward Neville d. 1476; 3rd de facto Baron Bergavenny (1392), 1st Baron Bergavenny (1450)	Elizabeth Beauchamp; 1415–1448; 3rd Baroness Bergavenny de jure suo jure
Barony Neville attained, 1461 reversed, 1472
King Henry VI; 1421–1471	Cecily Neville c. 1425–1450	Richard Neville; 1428–1471; Earl of Warwick	John Neville; 1431–1471; Marquess of Montagu	George Neville; 1432–1476; Archbishop of York	Thomas Neville; 1429–1471; Viscount Fauconberg	Henry Neville of Latimer; 1437–1469
(m1.) Edward of Westminster; 1453–1471; Prince of Wales	King Edward IV; 1442–1483	Ralph Neville c. 1456–1499; 3rd Earl of Westmorland; 8th/6th Baron Neville de Raby; 2nd Baron Neville (1459)	(m2.) Richard III; 1452–1485	Anne Neville; 1456–1485	George Neville; 1461–1483; Duke of Bedford	Isabel Neville; 1451–1476	George Plantagenet; 1449–1478; Duke of Clarence	George Neville c. 1440–1492; 4th de facto Baron Bergavenny (1392), 2nd Baron Bergavenny (1450)
Ralph Neville d. 1498	Edward Plantagenet; 1475–1499; Earl of Warwick	Richard Neville c. 1468–1530; 2nd Baron Latimer of Snape	George Neville c. 1469–1535; 5th de facto Baron Bergavenny (1392), 3rd Baron Bergavenny (1450)	Edward Neville; 1471–1538	Thomas Nevill c. 1484–1542
Ralph Neville; 1498–1549; 4th Earl of Westmorland; 9th/7th Baron Neville de Raby; 3rd Baron Neville (1459)	John Neville; 1493–1543; 3rd Baron Latimer of Snape
Henry Neville; 1525–1569; 5th Earl of Westmorland; 10th/8th Baron Neville de Raby; 4th Baron Neville (1459)	John Neville; 1520–1577; 4th Baron Latimer of Snape	Henry Nevill c. 1527/1535–1587; 6th Baron Bergavenny (1392), 4th Baron Bergavenny (1450)	Edward Nevill c. 1526–1588; 7th de facto Baron Bergavenny (1392)	Henry Neville c. 1520–1593
Barony Latimer of Snape abeyant, 1577
Baron Bergavenny (3rd creation), 1604
Charles Neville; 1542–1601; 6th Earl of Westmorland; 11th/9th Baron Baron Neville de Raby; 5th Baron Neville (1459)'	Mary Nevill; 1554–1626; 7th/5th Baroness Bergavenny; 3rd Baroness le Despenser	Edward Nevill c. 1550–1622; 8th de facto Baron Bergavenny (1392), 1st Baron Bergavenny (1604)	Henry Neville c. 1564–1615
Earldom of Westmorland (1st creation) and subsidiary titles forfeit, 1571
Earl of Westmorland (2nd creation) and Baron Burghersh (3rd creation), 1624
Francis Fane; 1580–1629; 1st Earl of Westmorland, etc., 8th/6th Baron Bergavenny de jure, Baron le Despencer	Henry Nevill c. 1570–1641; 9th de facto Baron Bergavenny, 2nd Baron Bergavenny (1604)	Christopher d. 1649
Inheritance of Barony Bergavenny (3rd creation) unknown, 1641
Baron Bergavenny (4th creation), after 1641–1662
Mildmay Fane; 1602–1666; 2nd Earl of Westmorland, etc.	Francis Fane c. 1611–1681	John Nevill c. 1614–1662; 10th de facto Baron Bergavenny (1392), Baron Bergavenny (4th creation)	George Nevill c. 1615–1666; 11th Baron Bergavenny	Richard Nevill d. 1643
Barony Bergavenny (4th creation) extinct, 1662
Baron Bergavenny (5th creation), after 1666–1695
Francis Fane d. 1691	George Nevill; 1665–1695; 12th de facto Baron Bergavenny (1392), Baron Bergavenny (5th creation)	George Nevill d. 1665
Barony Bergavenny (5th creation) extinct, 1695
Baron Bergavenny (6th creation), 1695
Charles Fane; 1635–1691; 3rd Earl of Westmorland, etc.	Vere Fane; 1645–1693; 4th Earl of Westmorland, etc.	Henry Fane of Brympton; 1669–1726	George Nevill c. 1659–1720/21; 13th de facto Baron Bergavenny (1392), 1st Baron Bergavenny (1695)	Edward Nevill 1664–1701
Vere Fane; 1678–1698; 5th Earl of Westmorland, etc.	Thomas Fane; 1681–1736; 6th Earl of Westmorland, etc.	John Fane; 1686–1762; 7th Earl of Westmorland, etc.
Baron Bergavenny (6th creation) abeyance terminated, 1737	Baron Bergavenny (7th creation), 1724
Thomas Fane; 1701–1771; 8th Earl of Westmorland, etc.	George Nevill; 1702–1723; 14th de facto Baron Bergavenny (1392), 2nd Baron Bergavenny (1695)	Jane Nevill, later Walter; 1703–1786; 4th Baroness Bergavenny (1695)	Edward Nevill c. 1705–1724; 15th de facto Baron Bergavenny (1392), 3rd Baron Bergavenny (1695)	William Nevill d. 1744; 16th de facto Baron Bergavenny (1392), 1st Baron Bergavenny (1724)
Barony Bergavenny (6th creation) abeyant, 1724
Earl of Abergavenny and Viscount Nevill, 1784
John Fane; 1728–1774; 9th Earl of Westmorland, etc.	John Walter d. 1806; 5th Baron Bergavenny (1695)	Charlotte Walter, later Senior c. 1738–1811; 6th Baroness Bergavenny (1695)	George Nevill; 1727–1785; 1st Earl of Abergavenny, etc., 17th de facto Baron Bergavenny (1392), 2nd Baron Bergavenny (1724)	Edward Nevill b. 1729
Barony Bergavenny (6th creation) abeyant, 1811
John Fane; 1759–1841; 10th Earl of Westmorland, etc.	Henry Nevill; 1755–1843; 2nd Earl of Abergavenny, etc., 18th de facto Baron Bergavenny (1392), 3rd Baron Bergavenny (1724)
John Fane; 1784–1859; 11th Earl of Westmorland, etc.	John Nevill; 1789–1845; 3rd Earl of Abergavenny, etc., 19th de facto Baron Bergavenny (1392), 4th Baron Bergavenny (1724)	William Nevill; 1792–1868; 4th Earl of Abergavenny, etc., 20th de facto Baron Bergavenny (1392), 5th Baron Bergavenny (1724)
Marquess of Abergavenny and Earl of Lewes, 1876
Francis William Henry Fane; 1825–1891; 12th Earl of Westmorland, etc.	William Nevill; 1826–1915; 1st Marquess of Abergavenny, etc., 5th Earl of Abergavenny, etc., 21st de facto Baron Bergavenny (1392), 6th Baron Bergavenny (1724)	Caroline Emily Nevill; 1829–1887	Henrietta Augusta Nevill; 1830–1912	Ralph Pelham Nevill; 1832–1914
Anthony Mildmay Julian Fane; 1859–1922; 13th Earl of Westmorland, etc.	Reginald William Bransby Nevill; 1853–1927; 2nd Marquess of Abergavenny, etc., 6th Earl of Abergavenny, etc., 22th de facto Baron Bergavenny (1392), 7th Baron Bergavenny (1724)	Henry Gilbert Ralph Nevill; 1854–1938; 3rd Marquess of Abergavenny, etc., 7th Earl of Abergavenny, etc., 23rd de facto Baron Bergavenny (1392), 8th Baron Bergavenny (1724)	George Montacute Nevill; 1856–1920	William Beauchamp Nevill; 1860–1939	Richard Plantagenet Nevill; 1862–1939	Percy Llewelyn Nevill; 1877–1927
Barony Bergavenny (6th and 7th creations) abeyant, 1938
Vere Anthony Francis Fane; 1893–1948; 14th Earl of Westmorland, etc.	Guy Temple Montacute Larnach-Nevill; 1883–1954; 4th Marquess of Abergavenny, etc., 8th Earl of Abergavenny, etc.
David Anthony Thomas Fane; 1924–1993; 15th Earl of Westmorland, etc.	John Henry Guy Nevill; 1914–2000; 5th Marquess of Abergavenny, etc., 9th Earl of Abergavenny, etc.	Rupert Charles Montecute Nevill; 1923–1982	Michael George Ralph Nevill; 1917–1943
Anthony David Francis Henry Fane b. 1951; 16th Earl of Westmorland, etc.	Harry St. Clair Fane; 1953–2023 styled Lord Burghersh	Christopher George Charles Nevill b. 1955; 6th Marquess of Abergavenny, etc., 10th Earl of Abergavenny, etc.	David Michael Ralph Nevill; 1941-2025	Michael George Rathmore Nevill b. 1943
Daisy Caroline Fane b. 1989	Sam Michael David Fane b. 1989	Guy Michael Rossmore Nevill b. 1973
Heir presumptive to the Earldom of Westmorland	Heir presumptive to the Earldom of Abergavenny
George David Roland Nevill b. 2010	Frederick Guy James Nevill b. 2012	Ralph William James Nevill b. 2015

== See also ==
- Baron Latymer
- Viscount Fane and Fane de Salis
- Baron Barnard

== Gallery ==
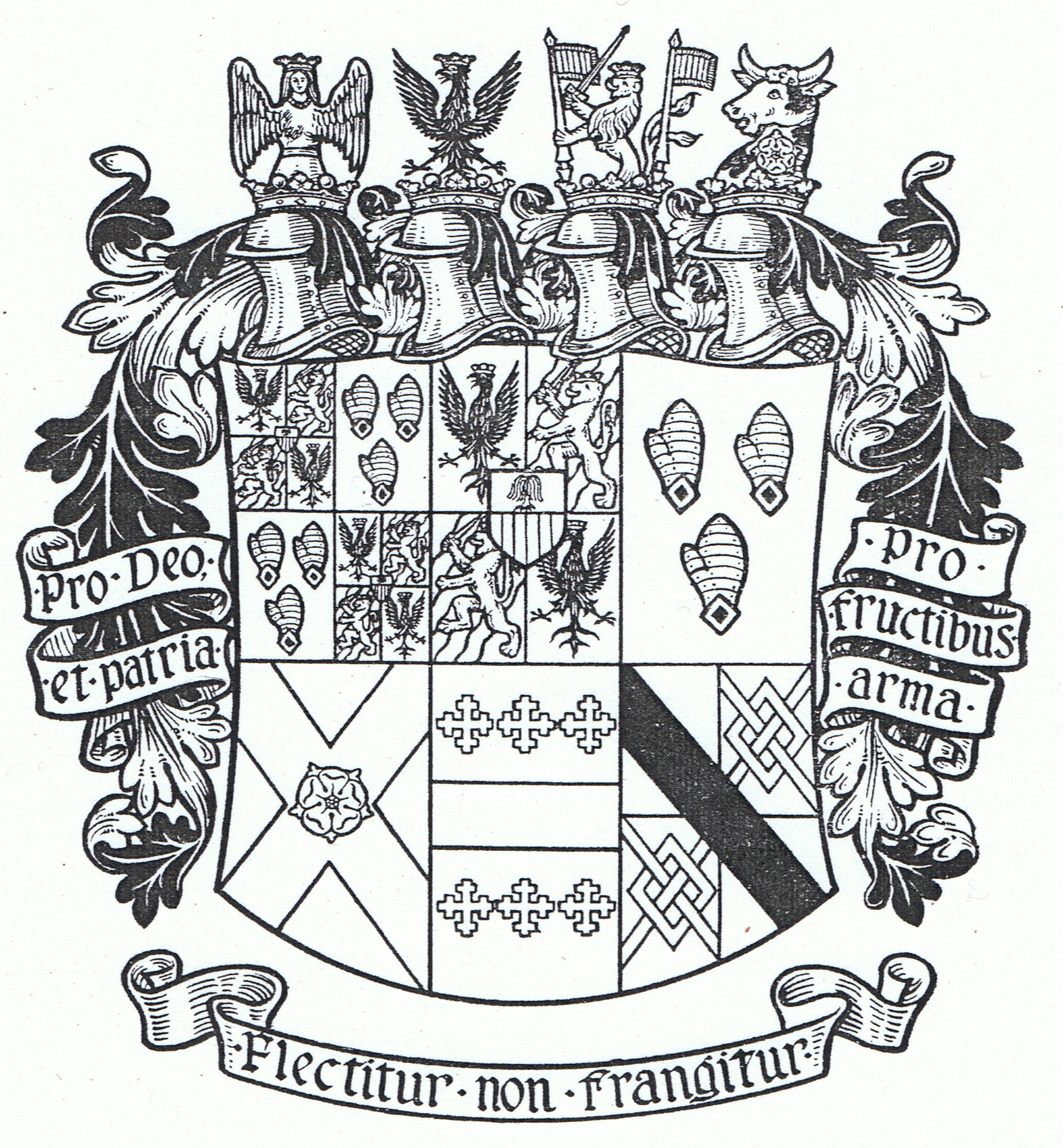
Fane De Salis Coat of arms

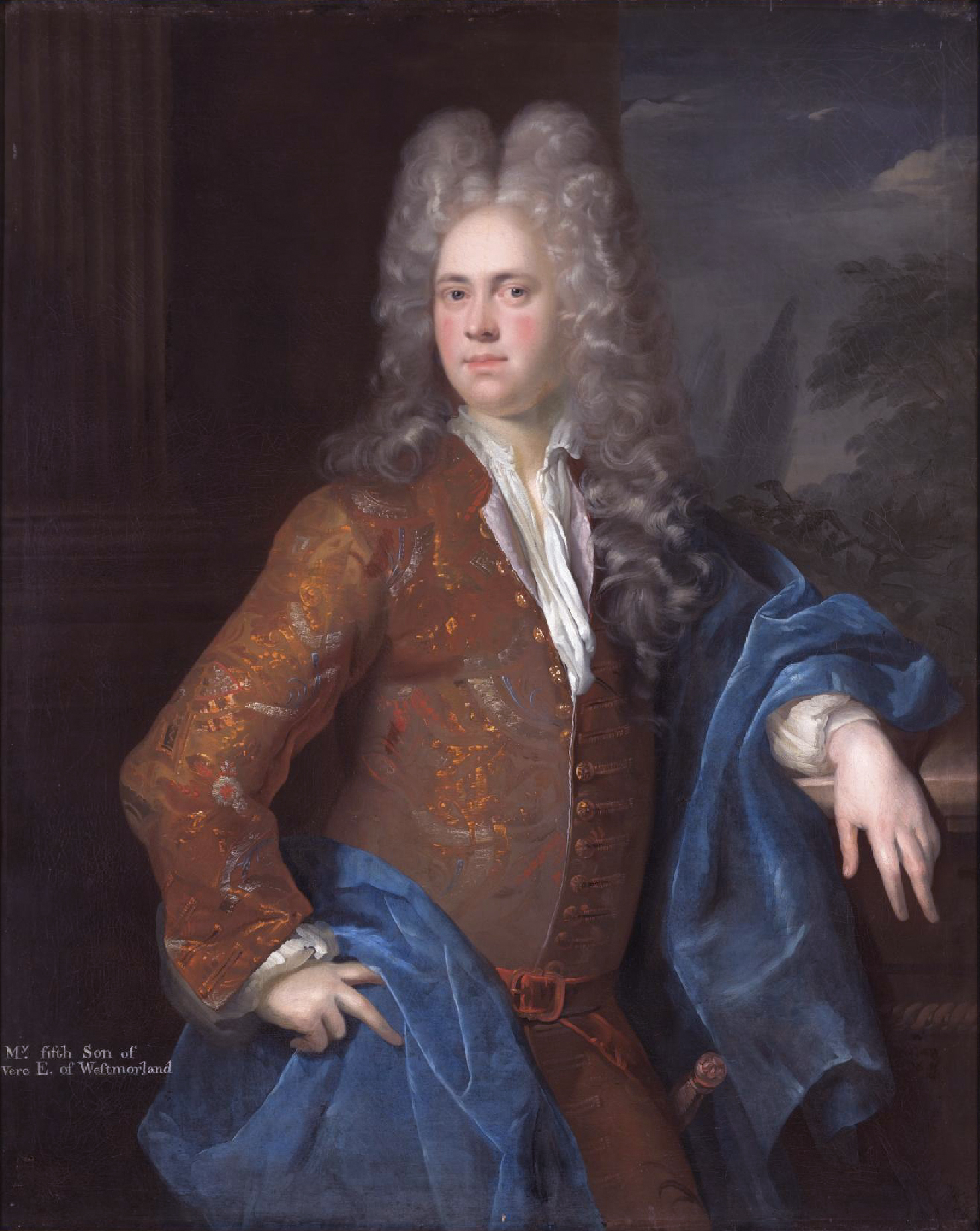
Mildmay Fane (1689-1715) by Alexis-Simon Belle

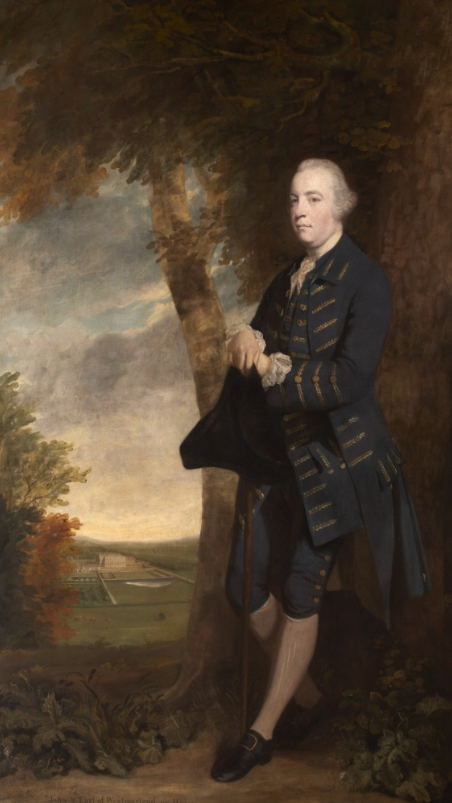
Portrait by Joshua Reynolds of John Fane 9th Earl, 1764.

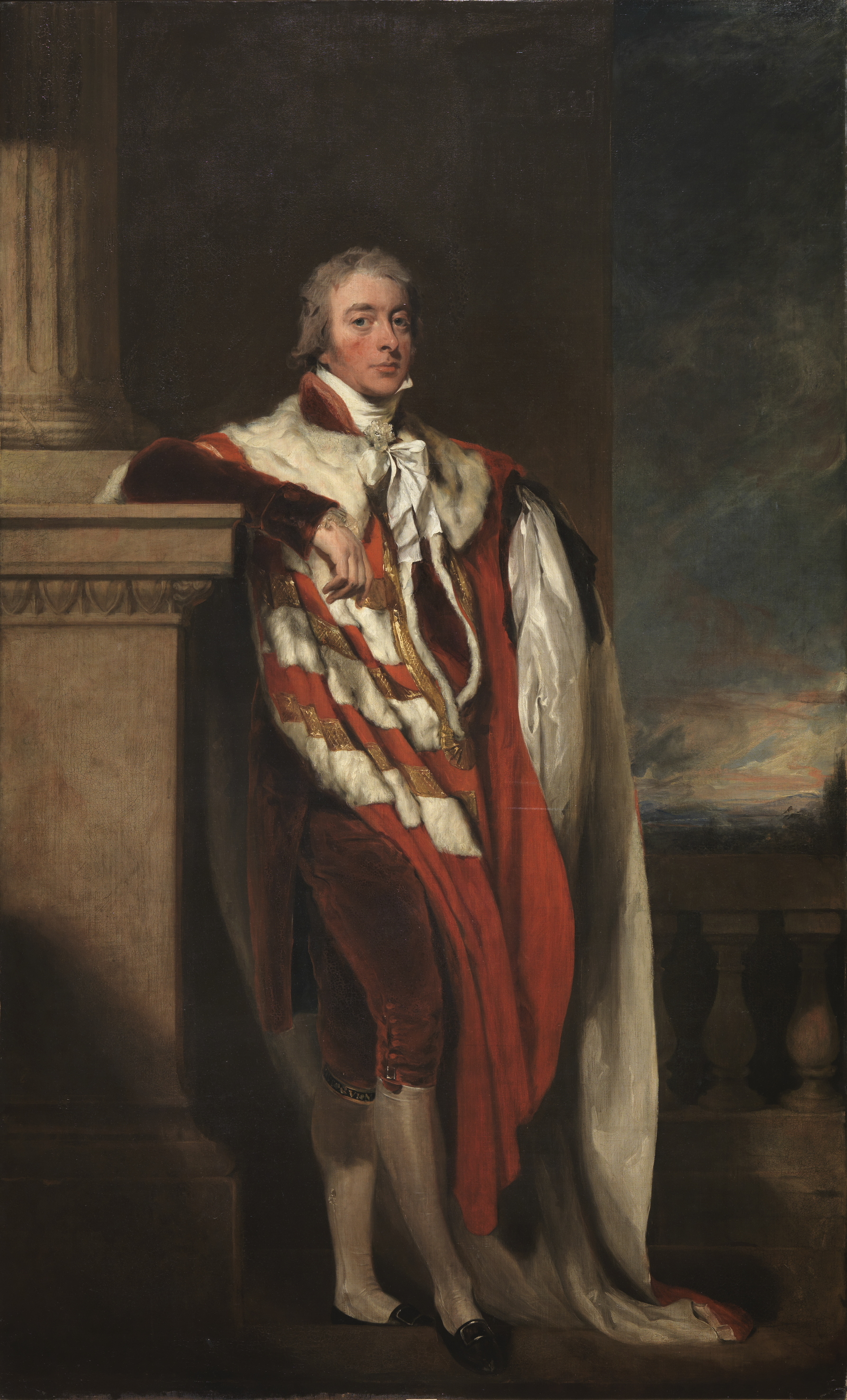
Portrait of Lord Westmoreland. Portrait by Thomas Lawrence of John Fane 10th Earl, 1806.

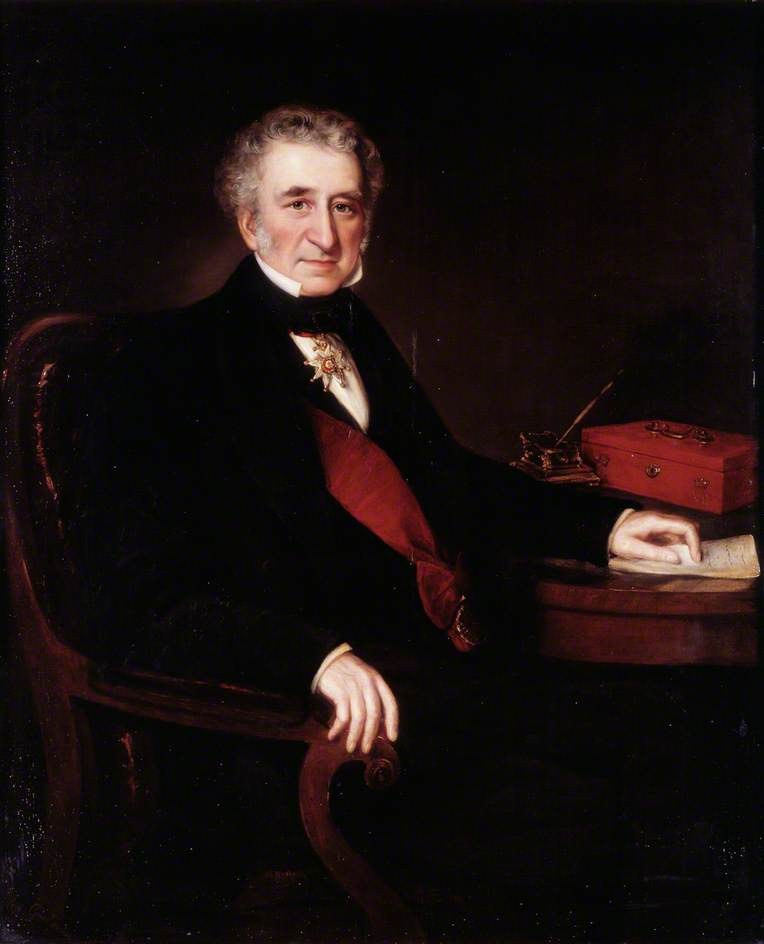
Portrait by Julia Goodman of John Fane 11th Earl, 1855
