= Forces sweetheart =

Favourite entertainers of armed forces

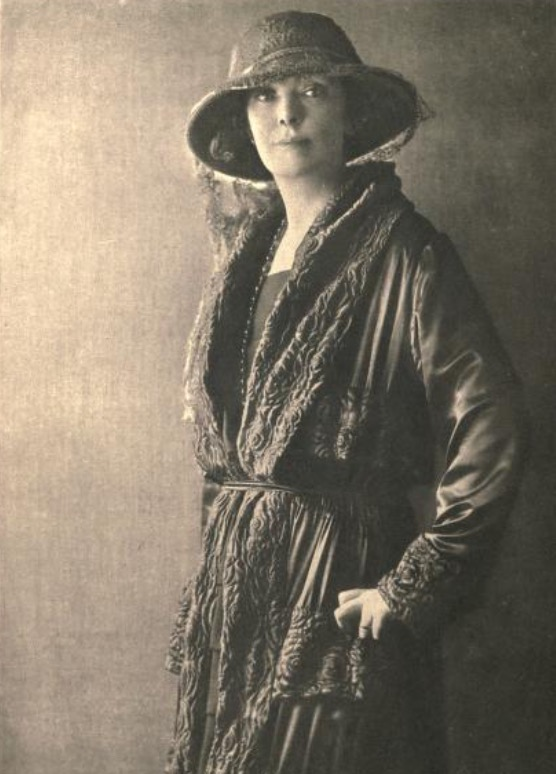
Lady Angela Forbes, a forces sweetheart during World War I

Forces Sweetheart (or Forces' Sweetheart) is an accolade given to entertainers, actors and singers. Originally, the term was used in the United Kingdom to note popular showbiz personalities who became a favourite of soldiers in the British Armed Forces, though the term is also used in other countries.

The role of being a favourite among armed forces personnel started during World War I. During this period, novelist Lady Angela Forbes was considered a "Forces Sweetheart" as a catering organiser for the British army from November 1914. The British Soldiers' Buffets, nicknamed "Angelinas", met every train of wounded as it arrived and were often open 24 hours a day, with food never running out.

Following Forbes, in the United States actress and singer Elsie Janis was called The Sweetheart of the American Expeditionary Forces.

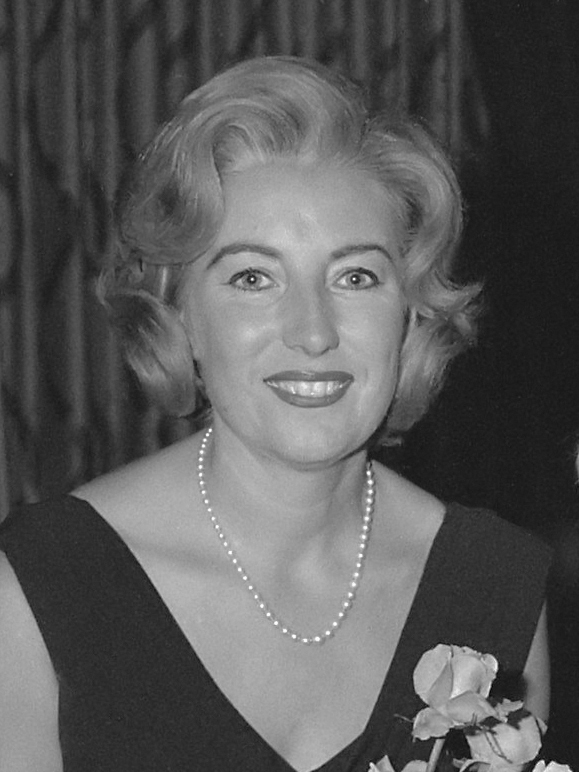
Vera Lynn was voted "Forces Sweetheart" in Britain during the World War II years in a 1939 poll by the Daily Express.

== Examples ==
=== British forces' sweethearts ===
During World War II, the term "forces' sweetheart" was most commonly associated with singer Vera Lynn, whose singing of songs such as "(There'll Be Bluebirds Over) The White Cliffs of Dover" and "We'll Meet Again" brought her fame in Britain; others popular at the time included Gracie Fields and Anne Shelton.

Latter-day "sweethearts" for the British serving forces have included Nell McAndrew, Katherine Jenkins, Kirsten Orsborn, Cheryl Cole, and Sarah Dennis, who was named as The Veterans Sweetheart in 2014. In 2011, London drag queen Richard Rhodes became perhaps the first man in the history of the term to be labelled a forces' sweetheart.

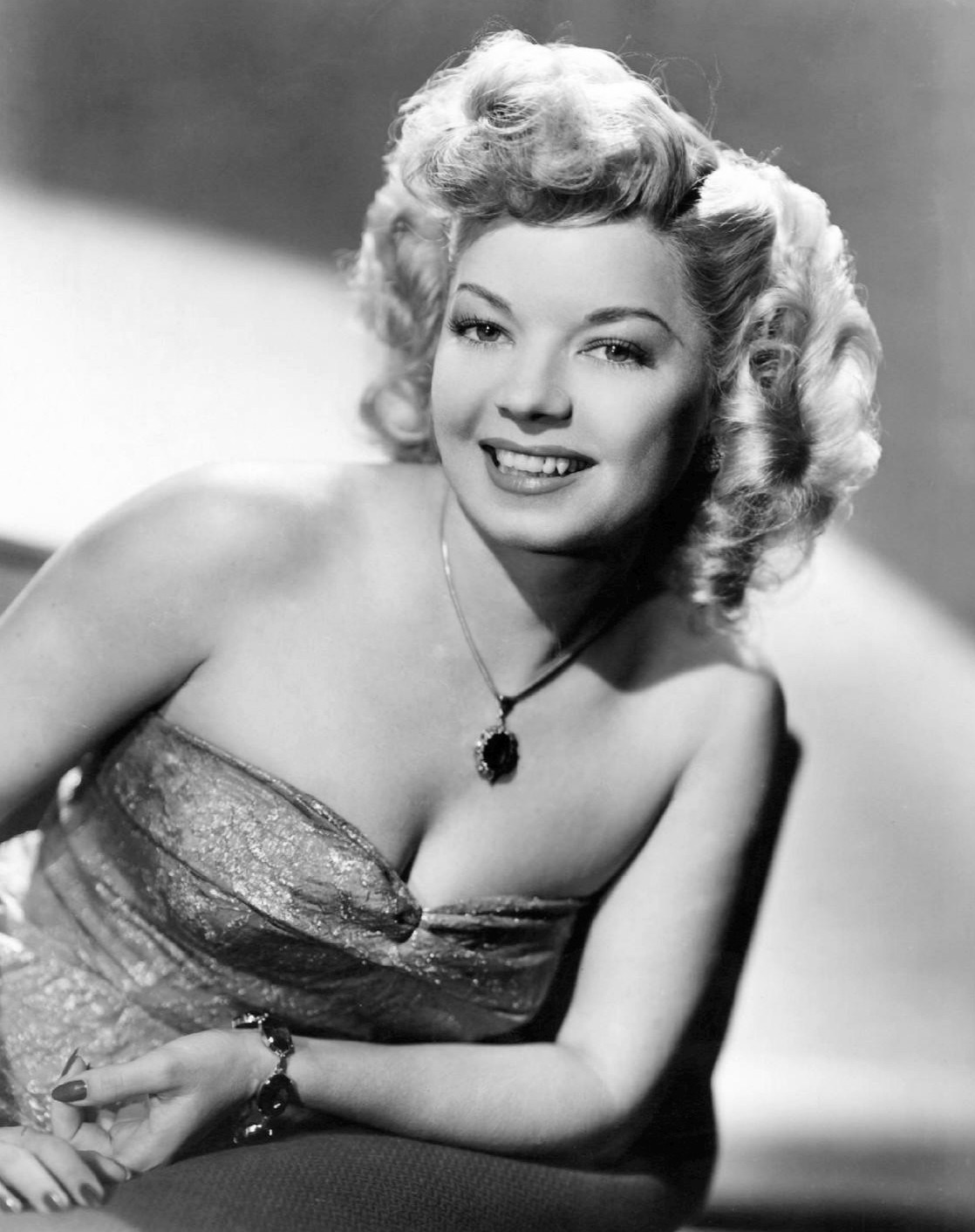
Frances Langford, nicknamed "The GI Nightingale" a popular US entertainer during the World War II years, and Korean and Vietnam Wars

=== United States ===
Frances Langford, an actress and singer, was billed as the "Singing Sweetheart of the Fighting Fronts" from World War II to the Korean War and the Vietnam War.

=== Commonwealth countries ===
Lorrae Desmond, who was at that time best known a singer and recording artist, performed along fellow vocalists Little Patti, Normie Rowe, Dinah Lee and numerous others as the "forces' sweetheart in Australia" when troops were stationed in Vietnam. Desmond herself toured Vietnam, the Middle East, Malaysia, Singapore, Kenya and Somalia.
