= Millicent Sutherland-Leveson-Gower, Duchess of Sutherland =

British society hostess, social reformer, author, editor, journalist and playwright

Her Grace The Duchess of Sutherland
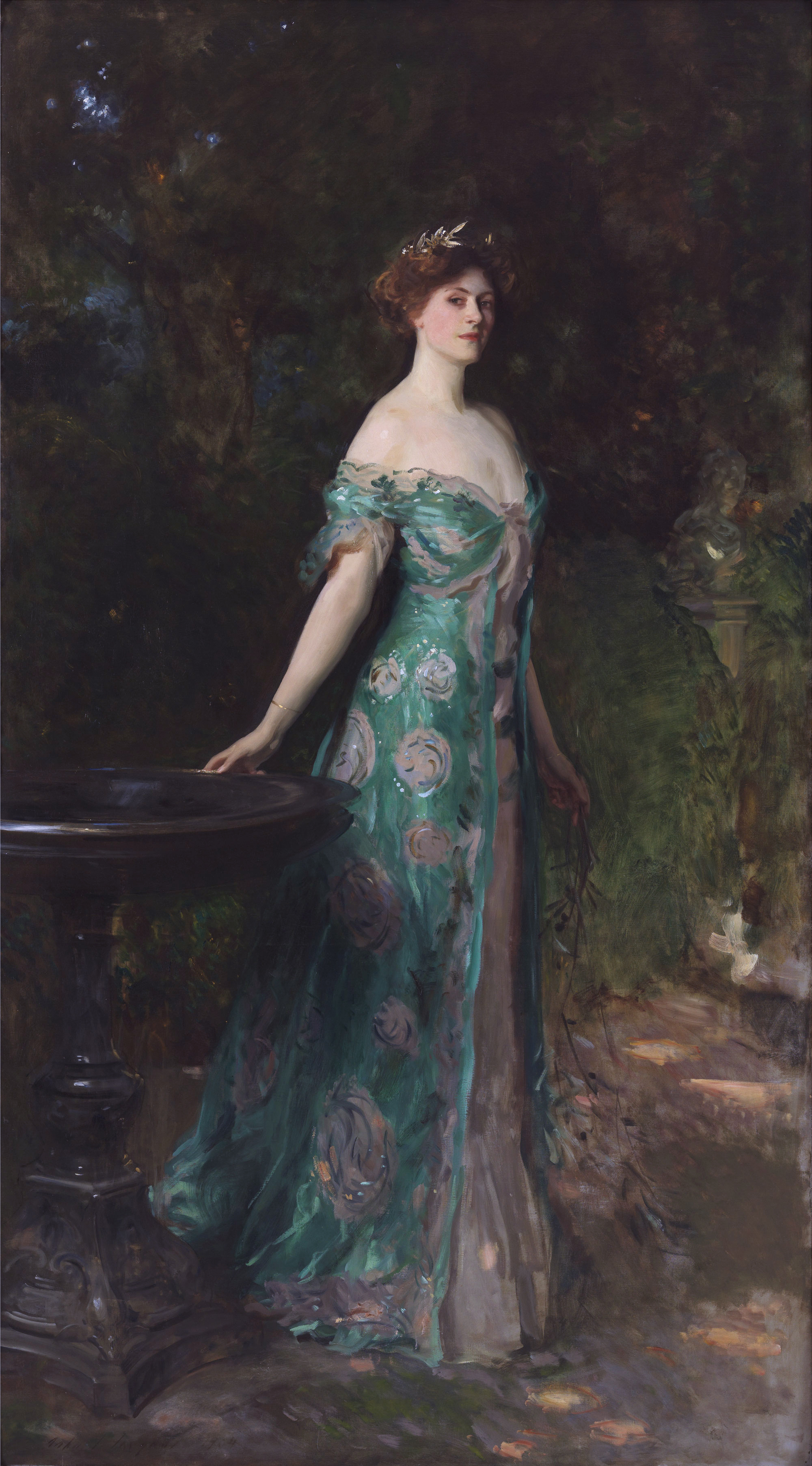
- Portrait of the Duchess of Sutherland, 1904, by John Singer Sargent. (Thyssen-Bornemisza Museum, Madrid).
- Born: Lady Millicent Fanny St. Clair-Erskine; 20 October 1867; Dysart, Fife, Scotland
- Died: 20 August 1955 (aged 87); Orriule, France
- Spouse(s): Cromartie Sutherland-Leveson-Gower (m. 1884; died 1913) Percy FitzGerald (m. 1914; div. 1919) George Hawes (m. 1919; div. 1925)
- Children: 4, including George and Rosemary
- Father: Robert St Clair-Erskine
- Relatives: Sybil Fane (sister); Angela Forbes (sister); Daisy Greville (half-sister)

Millicent Sutherland-Leveson-Gower, Duchess of Sutherland RRC (née Lady Millicent Fanny St. Clair-Erskine, 20 October 1867 – 20 August 1955) was a Scottish society hostess, social reformer, author, editor, journalist, and playwright, often using the pen name Erskine Gower. Her first husband was Cromartie Sutherland-Leveson-Gower, 4th Duke of Sutherland. By her two later marriages, she was known as Lady Millicent Fitzgerald and Lady Millicent Hawes, the latter of which was the name she used at the time of her death.

== Birth and family ==
She was born at Dysart House in Fife, the eldest daughter of the Scottish Conservative politician Robert St Clair-Erskine, 4th Earl of Rosslyn. Her sisters were Sybil Fane, Countess of Westmorland and Lady Angela Forbes. Their mother, Blanche Adeliza Fitzroy, was the widow of the Hon. Charles Maynard, making them half-sisters to Daisy Greville, Countess of Warwick and Blanche, Lady Algernon Gordon-Lennox (mother to Ivy Cavendish-Bentinck, Duchess of Portland). Their maternal grandfather was Henry Fitzroy, whose father, the Reverend Lord Henry Fitzroy, was a Canon of Westminster Abbey, in turn a son of the Prime Minister Augustus FitzRoy, 3rd Duke of Grafton.

== Duchess of Sutherland ==
Lady Millicent St. Clair-Erskine was married three times. She married Cromartie Sutherland-Leveson-Gower, Marquess of Stafford, eldest son and heir of the 3rd Duke of Sutherland, on 20 October 1884, her 17th birthday. He inherited the Dukedom of Sutherland on his father's death in 1892 and died in 1913.

They had four children:

- Lady Victoria Elizabeth Sutherland-Leveson-Gower (1885–1888)
- George Granville Sutherland-Leveson-Gower, 5th Duke of Sutherland (1888–1963)
- Alastair St. Clair Sutherland-Leveson-Gower (1890–1921), married Elizabeth Demarest and had Elizabeth Sutherland-Leveson-Gower, 24th Countess of Sutherland.
- Lady Rosemary Millicent Sutherland-Leveson-Gower (1893–1930), dated Edward, Prince of Wales; later married William Ward, 3rd Earl of Dudley and had three sons. Died in a plane crash with Frederick Hamilton-Temple-Blackwood, 3rd Marquess of Dufferin and Ava.

The family had homes in Scotland, Staffordshire, and London. She became a great society hostess at their London home, Stafford House, associated with both the Marlborough House set and the Souls. She also developed a reputation as an advocate for social reform, although to a lesser extent than her half-sister Daisy Warwick. She was known as ‘Meddlesome Millie’ for her campaigning for better working conditions in the Potteries, near the family seat. Her caricature appears in Arnold Bennett's Clayhanger Family novels as a countess with an ‘interfering meddlesomeness which so frequently exasperates the Five Towns’. However her campaign to remove lead paint glazes from Staffordshire pottery was successful.

She was one of the canopy bearers at the coronation of King Edward VII and Queen Alexandra, together with Consuelo Spencer-Churchill, Duchess of Marlborough, Violet Graham, Duchess of Montrose, and Winifred Cavendish-Bentinck, Duchess of Portland.

In 1903 Lady Cecil Scott Montagu formed the Ladies' Automobile Club and Sutherland was the inaugural President. Nearly half of the fifty members were women with titles.

== World War I and second marriage ==
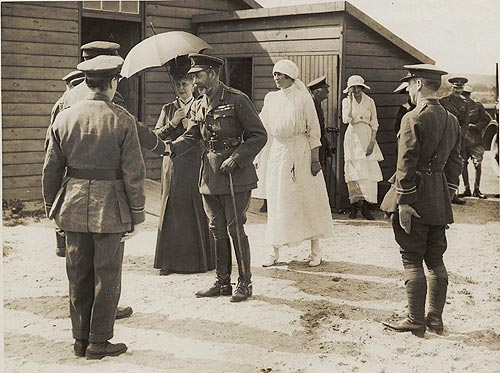
King George V and Queen Mary inspecting Millicent, Fourth Duchess of Sutherland’s, hospital at Calais during World War I

After the outbreak of the First World War in 1914, she organised an ambulance unit that saw active service in the siege of Namur, Belgium. Trapped behind enemy lines in Belgium, she escaped to England, where she wrote Six Weeks at the War. She returned to the continent in October to direct field hospitals in northern France. She moved with her unit to Roubaix in June 1918. For her war service, she was awarded the French Croix de Guerre, the Belgian Royal Red Cross medal, and the British Royal Red Cross.

She married Major (later Brig. Gen.) Percy Desmond Fitzgerald, 11th Hussars in October 1914, at which time she became known as Lady Millicent Fitzgerald. She and her second husband were divorced in 1919, on the grounds of his infidelity.

== Later life ==
She married for a third time, to Lt. Col. George Hawes in October 1919. The marriage was unhappy due to her husband's homosexuality, and they divorced in 1925. A semi-autobiographical novel, That Fool of a Woman, was published in 1924.

She lived mostly in France through the 1920s and 1930s, and also travelled. She was living near Angers in 1940, and was captured after the German occupation of France. She escaped via Spain and Portugal to the United States, and returned to Paris in 1945.

She died in Orriule, near Sauveterre-de-Béarn, in south-west France. She was cremated at Père Lachaise cemetery in Paris, and her ashes were interred at the Sutherland private cemetery at Dunrobin Castle. She was survived by her eldest son, George Granville Sutherland-Leveson-Gower, 5th Duke of Sutherland.

== The Duchess in art ==
Her 1904 portrait by John Singer Sargent is now in Madrid. It was part of the estate of press agent Benjamin Sonnenberg, and was sold at auction by Sotheby's in 1979 for $210,000, setting a record for the artist's work.

The bookbinder G.T. Bagguley was librarian of the ducal library at Trentham Hall. He patented the Sutherland bookbinding which he named after the duchess. It is a method of tooling in colours which was principally employed on doublures.

A set of ten oil paintings by Victor Tardieu (1870–1937) record the tented field hospital established and run by Millicent at Bourbourg, 12 miles (19 km) south-west of Dunkirk, during the summer of 1915.The dedication on No.2 reads: "à Madame la Duchess M de Sutherland/Hommage respecteux et tres reconnaisant/d'un simple soldat". The series went on sale at Abbott and Holder gallery in London in early 2012, and was acquired by the Florence Nightingale Museum. The museum announced that for the First World War centenary, from March–September 2014 it would use these paintings to examine the history of nursing in the Great War and the crucial role played by women volunteers in the battlefields of France and Belgium.

== Publications ==
She wrote novels, including One Hour and the Next (1899) and a collection of short stories, The Winds of the World (1902), and a play in blank verse. The Conqueror (1905) was performed at the Scala Theatre in London.

- How I Spent My Twentieth Year, 1889 (memoir)
- How I Spent My Twenty-first Year (memoir)
- One Hour and the Next, 1899 (novel)
- The Wind of the World: Seven Love Stories, London: William Heinemann, 1902 (short-story collection, written as Millicent Sutherland)
- The Conqueror, 1905 (play and lyrics to incidental music, written as R.E. Fyffe)
- Six Weeks at the War, Chicago: A.C. McClurg & Co., 1915 (war memoir, written as Millicent, Duchess of Sutherland)
- That Fool of a Woman (1924)

== Resources ==
- Stuart, Denis. Dear Duchess: Millicent Duchess of Sutherland, 1867-1955. David & Charles (April 1982). ISBN 0-575-03020-8 ISBN 978-0575030206
- "Women in Great Social Positions: Britain's Most Versatile Peeress, The Duchess of Sutherland"

== Ancestry ==
Ancestors of Millicent Sutherland-Leveson-Gower, Duchess of Sutherland

8. James St Clair-Erskine, 2nd Earl of Rosslyn
4. James St Clair-Erskine, 3rd Earl of Rosslyn
9. Harriet Elizabeth Bouverie
2. Robert St Clair-Erskine, 4th Earl of Rosslyn
10. William Wemyss
5. Frances Wemyss
11. Frances Erskine
1. Millicent Fanny St Claire-Erskine
12. Henry Fitzroy
6. Henry Fitzroy
13. Caroline Pigot
3. Blanche Adeliza Fitzroy
14. George Charles Beauclerk
7. Jane Elizabeth Beauclerk
15. Emily Charlotte Ogilvie
