= Julian Fane (author) =

British author

The Honourable Julian Charles Fane (27 May 1927 – 13 December 2009) was a British author.

== Early life ==
Fane was the younger son of Vere Fane, 14th Earl of Westmorland and his wife Diana, daughter of Thomas Lister, 4th Baron Ribblesdale and widow of Arthur Capel. His childhood was spent at Lyegrove, Gloucestershire, where his mother created a celebrated garden. He was educated at Harrow.

== Career ==
After some attempts at writing plays, at the age of 29, Fane published his first novel, Morning (1956), a description of a small boy’s childhood prior to being sent to boarding school. It was a literary success. John Betjeman wrote in The Daily Telegraph that Morning "seems to me to deserve to last for generations" and he chose it as one of his Books of the Year. In The Observer Harold Nicolson also described it as "the work of a literary artist, beautifully written". This reception encouraged Fane to devote his life to writing, a career that he took seriously, generally writing for five hours a day, every day, and avoiding social engagements he felt would distract from his work. In his long career he produced some forty works, though popular success eluded him. They were mostly novels, though his non-fiction books include Best Friends — an entertaining account of his friendships with Rachel and Lord David Cecil, Lady Cynthia Asquith, L. P. Hartley and others, and Memories of My Mother, an evocation of the life of Diana, Countess of Westmorland.

He reviewed for The Times Literary Supplement and in 1969 set up St George's Press with two partners, publishing 45 titles before it was wound up in 1991. In 1974 he was elected a Fellow of the Royal Society of Literature. In 1999, he declared that his latest novel, called Evening to balance Morning, would be his last. For the next two years he kept a journal, eventually published as The Time Diaries, but missing writing stories he gave up retirement and embarked on a new burst of creativity, publishing a novel every six months.

== Personal life ==
In 1976, he married Gillian Swire, daughter of John Kidston Swire. Gillian was for some years a director of Glyndebourne Opera House. They were generous patrons to Glyndebourne and other good causes, and lived in Lewes. Fane died on 13 December 2009, aged 82.
