= Vere Fane, 14th Earl of Westmorland =

British peer

Lieutenant-Commander The Right Honourable The Earl of Westmorland
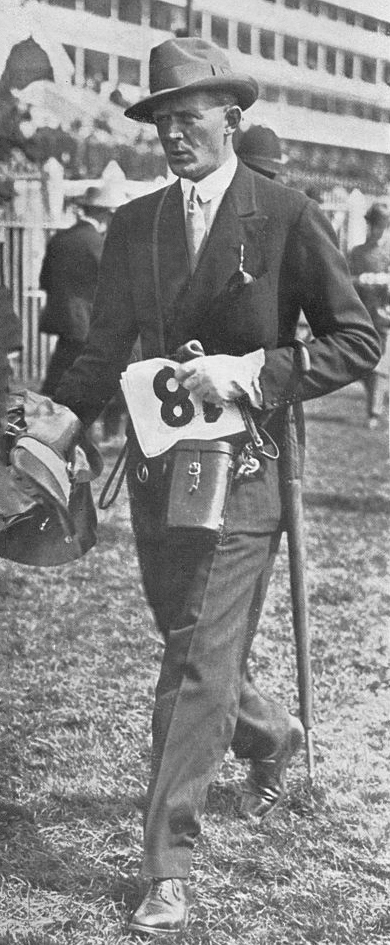
- The 14th Earl of Westmorland

Personal details
- Born: Vere Anthony Francis Fane, Lord Burghersh; 25 March 1893
- Died: 12 May 1948 (aged 55)
- Spouse: Hon. Diana Capel (m. 1923)
- Children: 3, including: David Fane, 15th Earl of Westmorland; Hon. Julian Fane
- Parents: Anthony Fane, 13th Earl of Westmorland; Lady Sybil St Clair-Erskine

Military service
- Allegiance: United Kingdom
- Branch/service: Royal Navy
- Rank: Lieutenant-Commander
- Battles/wars: World War I: Battle of Jutland

Lieutenant-Commander Vere Anthony Francis Fane, 14th Earl of Westmorland (25 March 1893 – 12 May 1948), styled Lord Burghersh until 1922, was a British peer.

Styled Lord Burghersh from birth, he was the eldest son of Anthony Fane, 13th Earl of Westmorland, by Lady Sybil Mary, daughter of Robert St Clair-Erskine, 4th Earl of Rosslyn. He served in the Royal Navy during the First World War and was present at the Battle of Jutland aboard Lion, Lord Beatty's flagship. Noted as a "sporting peer", he succeeded his father in the earldom in 1922, when he began his association with horse racing. Having always been a keen rider to hounds he now raced as an amateur both on the flat and under National Hunt rules. He also owned and trained racehorses, having a particularly successful season in 1923 when he trained 23 winners. In 1924 Royal Chancellor won him the Scottish Grand National.

Having visited America to study business methods he began a business career in 1929 and was elected to the boards of two energy companies. He retired from training in 1931 but continued his sporting interests, which included hunting, boxing, shooting, and in his later years golf; he was also on the board of Arsenal Football Club.

Lord Westmorland married the Honourable Diana, daughter of Thomas Lister, 4th Baron Ribblesdale, and widow of both Percy Lyulph Wyndham (son of George Wyndham and half-brother of Hugh Grosvenor, 2nd Duke of Westminster) and Arthur Capel, in 1923. They had two sons, of whom the elder, David, succeeded him; the younger son was the author Julian Fane. They also had a daughter, Lady Rose Fane. Lord Westmorland died at his home near Badminton, Gloucestershire, on 12 May 1948, aged 55, after an illness of some three months. He was described in his obituary as being "of handsome appearance and impressive deportment". The Countess of Westmorland died in December 1983, aged 90.

== Arms ==
Coat of arms of Vere Fane, 14th Earl of Westmorland
Crest Out of a ducal coronet Or, a bull's head Argent pied Sable, armed of the first, charged on the neck with a rose Gules barbed and seeded Proper. Escutcheon Azure three dexter gauntlets backs affrontée Or. Supporters Dexter: a griffin per fesse Argent and Or, gorged with a plain collar and lined Sable; Sinister: a bull Argent pied Sable collared and lined Or, at the end of the line a ring and three staples of the last. Motto "NE VILE FANO" (Disgrace not the altar)

Peerage of England
Preceded by Anthony Mildmay Julian Fane	Earl of Westmorland; 1922–1948	Succeeded by David Anthony Thomas Fane
