= Robert St Clair-Erskine, 4th Earl of Rosslyn =

British Conservative politician

The Right Honourable The Earl of Rosslyn
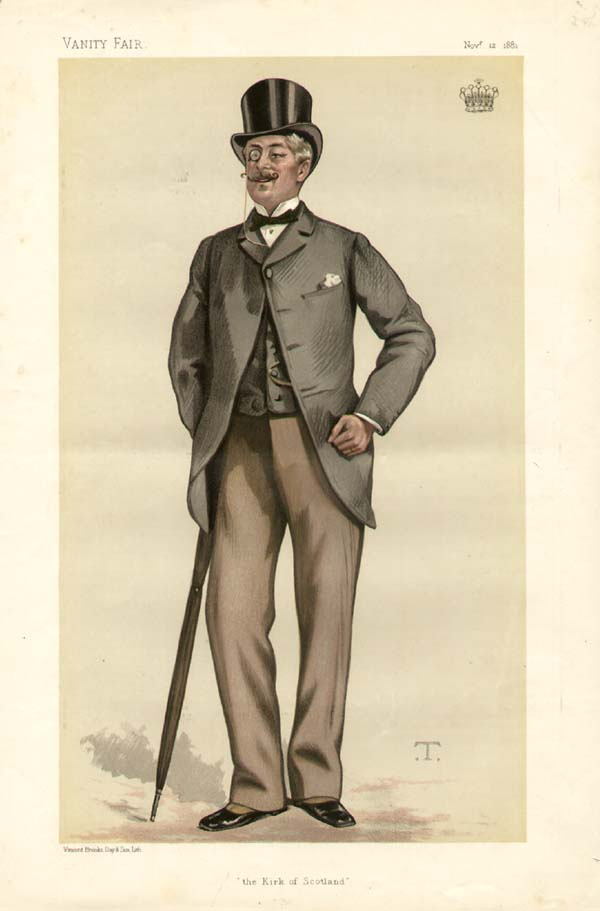
- "The Kirk of Scotland". The Earl of Rosslyn as caricatured by Théobald Chartran in Vanity Fair, November 1881.

Captain of the Gentlemen-at-Arms
- In office 24 November 1886 – 11 August 1890
- Monarch: Victoria
- Prime Minister: The Marquess of Salisbury
- Preceded by: The Viscount Barrington
- Succeeded by: The Earl of Yarborough

Member of the House of Lords Lord Temporal
- In office 16 June 1866 – 6 September 1890; Hereditary Peerage
- Preceded by: The 3rd Earl of Rosslyn
- Succeeded by: The 5th Earl of Rosslyn

Personal details
- Born: 2 March 1833
- Died: 6 September 1890 (aged 57)
- Party: Conservative
- Spouse: Blanche Adeliza Maynard (m. 1866)
- Children: Millicent Leveson-Gower, Duchess of Sutherland; James St Clair-Erskine, 5th Earl of Rosslyn; Alexander St Clair-Erskine; Sybil Fane, Countess of Westmorland; Lady Angela Forbes
- Parents: James St Clair-Erskine, 3rd Earl of Rosslyn (father); Frances Wemyss (mother)
- Relatives: Daisy Greville, Countess of Warwick (stepdaughter)

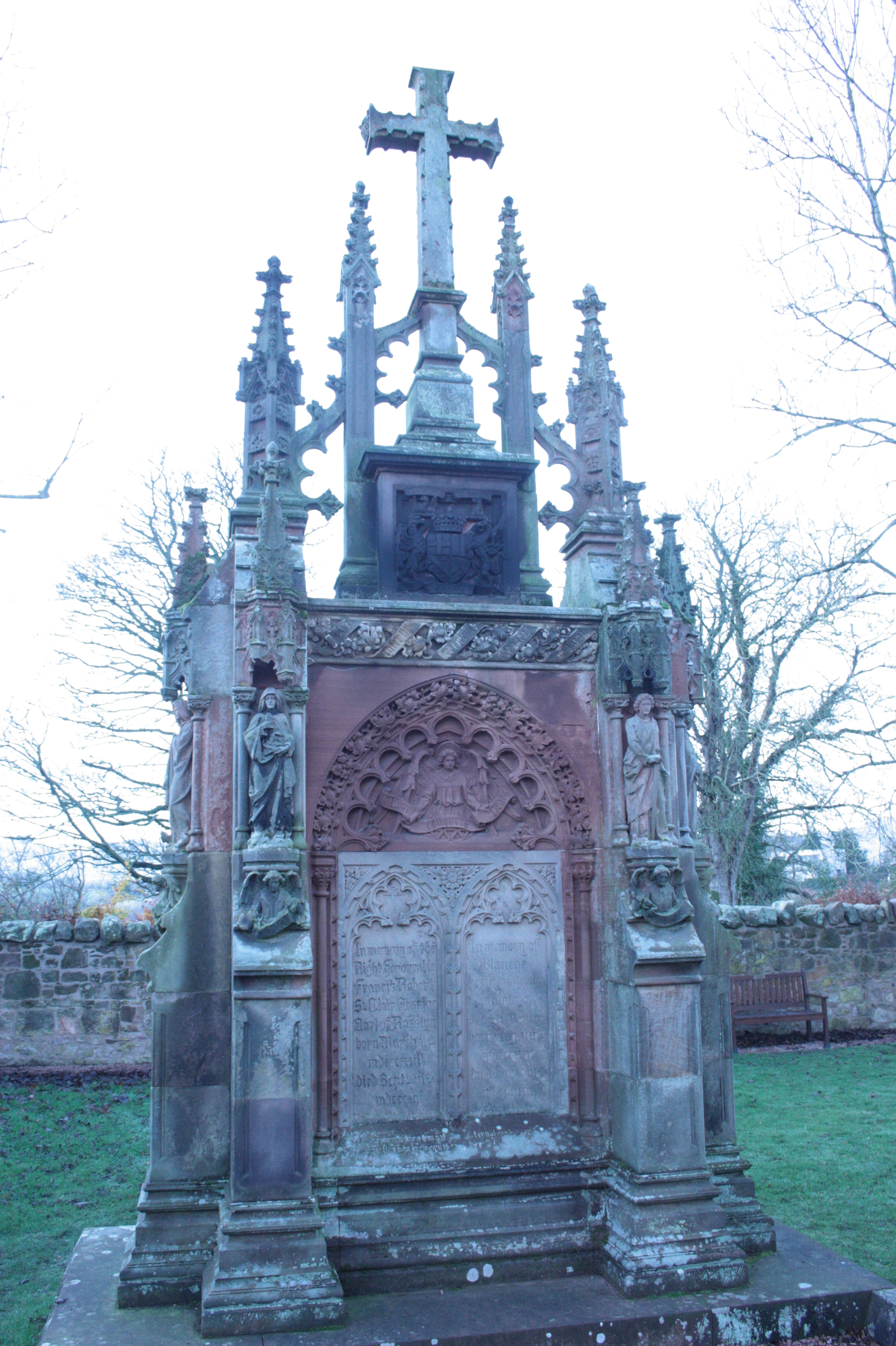
The grave of Robert Francis St Clair-Erskine near Rosslyn Chapel, Midlothian

Robert Francis St Clair-Erskine, 4th Earl of Rosslyn (2 March 1833 – 6 September 1890), styled Lord Loughborough from 1851 until 1866, was a British Conservative politician. He served as Captain of the Gentlemen-at-Arms under Lord Salisbury between 1886 and 1890.

== Early life ==
Rosslyn was the son of James St Clair-Erskine, 3rd Earl of Rosslyn, and Frances (née Wemyss). He succeeded his father in the earldom in 1866.

He served under Lord Salisbury as Captain of the Honourable Corps of Gentlemen-at-Arms from 1886 until shortly before his death in September 1890. He was a minor poet and published "Sonnets" in 1883, "A Jubilee Lyric" in 1887 (dedicated to Queen Victoria) and "Sonnets and Poems" in 1889.

== Freemasonry ==
Robert joined Lodge Oswald of Dunnikier together with James Townsend Oswald on 8 April 1867. In addition to being a Grand Master Mason of the Grand Lodge of Scotland between 1870 and 1873, he became Depute Master of Lodge Canongate Kilwinning, No. 2, on 1 August 1853. Lord Rosslyn was the Grand Master of the modern Masonic Great Priory of Scotland from 1884 until his death in 1890. He was also the Grand Master of the Royal Order of Scotland from 1883.

== Personal life ==
Lord Rosslyn married Blanche Adeliza (née Fitzroy) Maynard (1839–1933), a great-granddaughter of Augustus FitzRoy, 3rd Duke of Grafton and widow of Colonel Hon. Charles Henry Maynard (son of the 3rd Viscount Maynard), on 8 November 1866. They had five children:

- Lady Millicent Fanny St Clair-Erskine (1867–1955), whose first husband was Cromartie Sutherland-Leveson-Gower, 4th Duke of Sutherland
- James Francis Harry St Clair-Erskine, 5th Earl of Rosslyn (1869–1939)
- Hon. Alexander FitzRoy St Clair-Erskine (1870–1914), who married Winifrede Baker, a daughter of Henry William Baker of California, in 1905
- Lady Sybil Mary St Clair-Erskine (1871–1910), who married Anthony Fane, 13th Earl of Westmorland
- Lady Angela Selina Bianca St Clair-Erskine (1876–1950), who married Lt-Col James Stewart Forbes, of Asloun, Aberdeenshire

Lady Rosslyn had two daughters by her first marriage: Frances Evelyn "Daisy" Maynard (who married Francis Greville, 5th Earl of Warwick) and Blanche "Blanchie" Maynard (who married Lord Algernon Gordon-Lennox and was the mother of Ivy Cavendish-Bentinck, Duchess of Portland).

Lord Rosslyn died in Dysart, Fife on 6 September 1890, aged 57. He was buried on 11 September, just west of Rosslyn Chapel, which traditionally has very strong masonic links. The monument is carved in two different types of sandstone. His wife Blanche was later buried with him.

Lady Rosslyn survived her husband by over 40 years and died at York Terrace, Regent's Park, London, in December 1933. She was described in her obituary in The New York Times as "one of the last survivors of the great Victorian hostesses". She knew personally many of the most famous people of the Victorian era, including Benjamin Disraeli and William Gladstone.

Political offices
Preceded by The Viscount Barrington	Captain of the Gentlemen-at-Arms; 1886–1890	Succeeded by The Earl of Yarborough
Masonic offices
Preceded by The Earl of Dalhousie	Grand Master of the Grand Lodge of Scotland; 1870–1873	Succeeded by Sir Michael Shaw-Stewart, Bt
Peerage of the United Kingdom
Preceded by James St Clair-Erskine	Earl of Rosslyn; 1866–1890	Succeeded by James St Clair-Erskine
