= Sybil Fane, Countess of Westmorland =

British aristocrat and socialite

The Right Honourable The Countess of Westmorland
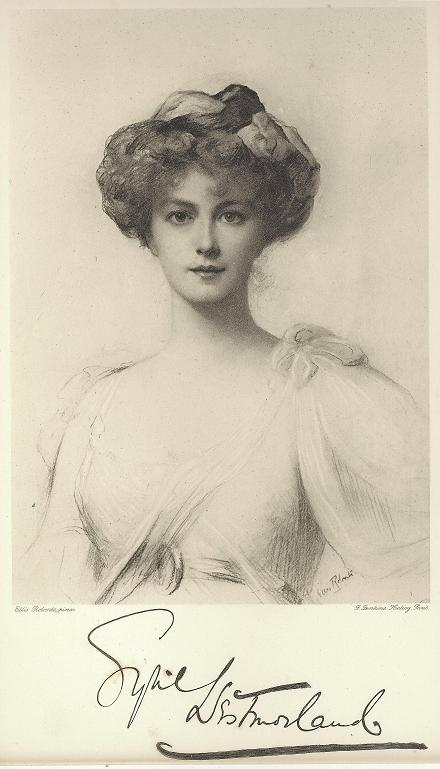
- Sybil Fane, Countess of Westmorland, ca. 1900
- Born: Lady Sybil Mary St Clair-Erskine; 20 August 1871; Mayfair, London, England
- Died: 21 July 1910 (aged 38); Marylebone, London, England
- Spouse: Anthony Fane, 13th Earl of Westmorland (m. 1892)
- Children: Vere Fane, 14th Earl of Westmorland; Lady Enid Turnor; Hon. Mountjoy Fane; Lady Gloria Fane
- Parents: Robert St Clair-Erskine, 4th Earl of Rosslyn; Blanche Adeliza Fitzroy
- Relatives: Millicent Leveson-Gower, Duchess of Sutherland (sister); Lady Angela Forbes (sister); Daisy Greville, Countess of Warwick (maternal half-sister)

Sybil Mary Fane, Countess of Westmorland (20 August 1871 – 21 July 1910), born Lady Sybil Mary St Clair-Erskine, was a British aristocrat and socialite.

== Life ==
Born on 20 August 1871 at 40 Upper Brook Street in Mayfair, London, Lady Sybil was the daughter of Robert Francis St Clair-Erskine, 4th Earl of Rosslyn and Blanche Adeliza Fitzroy. Her sisters were Millicent, Duchess of Sutherland and Lady Angela Forbes; Daisy, Countess of Warwick was a half-sister, from their mother’s previous marriage to Hon. Charles Henry Maynard.

She was renowned for her beauty, and had no qualms about enhancing it by the use of cosmetics, which was considered daring at the time. She was connected with the group known as The Souls, having been introduced by George Curzon.

On 28 May 1892 she married Anthony Mildmay Julian Fane, 13th Earl of Westmorland. The wedding took place at St. Michael's Church, Chester Square, Belgravia, London. Upon her marriage, Sybil took the title Countess of Westmorland. The couple had the following children:

- Lt.-Comm. the Hon. Vere Anthony Francis St Clair Fane, 14th Earl of Westmorland (15 March 1893 – 12 May 1948)
- Lady Enid Victoria Rachel Fane (24 April 1894 – 9 September 1969); married Major Herbert Broke Turnor. They were the maternal grandparents of Neil McCorquodale, who married Lady Sarah Spencer (elder sister of Diana, Princess of Wales).
- Maj. the Hon. Mountjoy John Charles Wedderburn Fane (8 October 1900 – 9 October 1963)
- Lady Violet Gloria Sybil Fane (11 April 1902 – 9 September 1969)

In July 1897 Sybil attended the Duchess of Devonshire’s grand ball, at Devonshire House in Piccadilly, London. The ball was held in celebration of Queen Victoria’s diamond jubilee, and was one of the most extravagant aristocratic parties ever. Guests were asked to attend dressed as allegorical or historical figures from before 1815. Sybil dressed as Hebe, goddess of youth, carrying a gold cup in her hand, with an enormous stuffed eagle strapped to her shoulders, in imitation of a painting by Joshua Reynolds. The society photographers, Lafayette Studios of Bond Street London, erected a tent in the garden, and the printed photographs of the guests still exist in the Devonshire archives at Chatsworth. Consuelo, Duchess of Marlborough remembered Sybil as the outstanding beauty of the Devonshire House Ball:

"She had perhaps the most perfect face. I can see her now in a Greek peplum impersonating Hebe. The grey feathers of a life-like stuffed eagle perched on her shoulder, set off the glorious sheen of her red hair".

Sybil, Countess of Westmorland was the inspiration behind the character Lady Roehampton in Vita Sackville-West's novel, The Edwardians.

Lady Westmorland died at 58 Queen Anne’s Street in Marylebone, London on 21 July 1910, aged 38, and was buried in the Rosslyn Chapel.

== Gallery ==
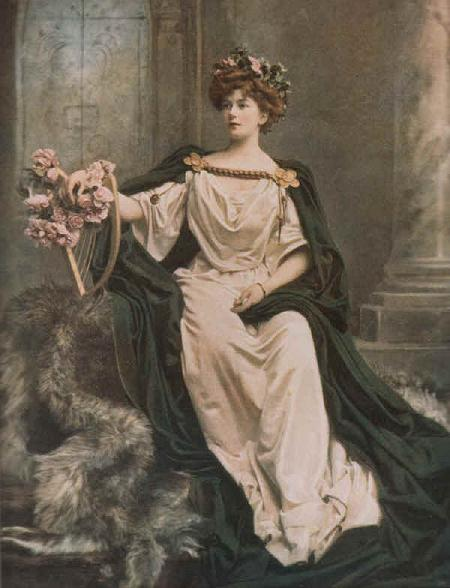
Sybil Fane, Countess of Westmorland, dressed as an allegory of Great Britain - Lafayette Studio, February 1900

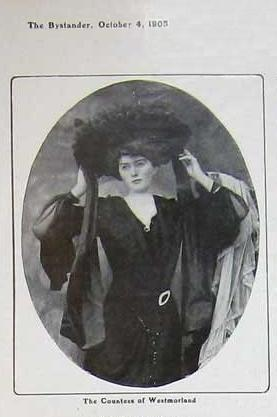
Sybil Fane, Countess of Westmorland, 1905

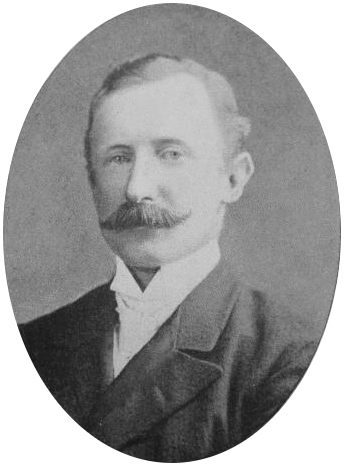
Sybil’s husband, Anthony Fane, 13th Earl of Westmorland, 1893

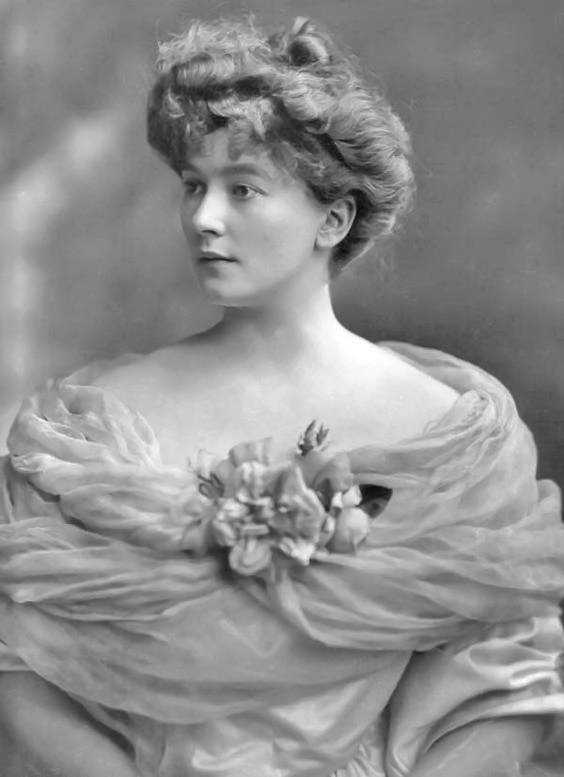
Lady Sybil Mary St Clair-Erskine before she became Countess of Westmorland in 1892
