= Boy Capel =

English polo player

Captain Arthur Edward Capel
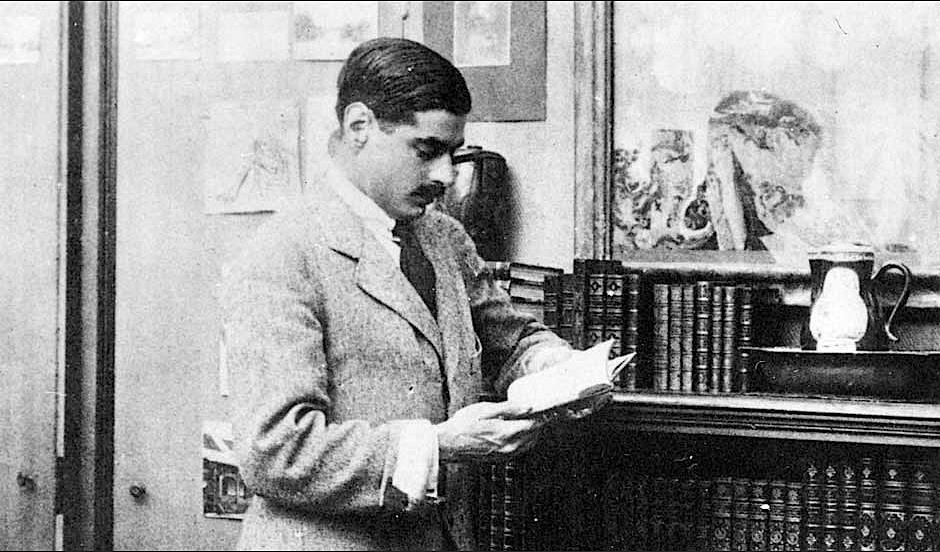
- Arthur "Boy" Capel
- Born: 20 December 1881; Brighton, Sussex, UK
- Died: 22 December 1919 (aged 38); Puget-sur-Argens, Var, Southern France
- Resting place: Montmartre Cemetery
- Citizenship: British
- Education: Beaumont College
- Occupation: Shipping merchant
- Known for: polo player, partner with Coco Chanel
- Spouse(s): Diana Wyndham, née Lister
- Children: 2
- Relatives: Georgina Ward (granddaughter)
- Awards: CBE

Arthur Edward Capel CBE (20 December 1881–22 December 1919), known as Boy Capel, was an English polo player, possibly best-remembered for being a lover and muse of fashion designer Coco Chanel.

== Biography ==
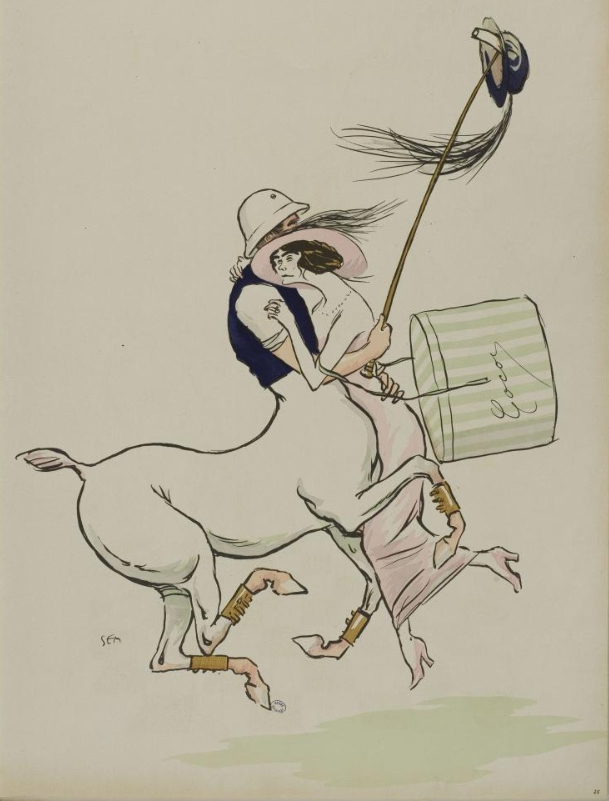
Caricature (1913) by 'Sem' of Capel dancing with Chanel

Born in Brighton, Sussex, Capel was the son of Arthur Joseph Capel, a British shipping merchant, and his French-born wife, the former Berthe Andrée A. E. Lorin (1856–1902). He had three sisters: Marie Henriette Teresia Capel, Mary Josephine Lawrence Edith Capel and Berthe Isabelle Susanna Flora Capel. Berthe married Sir Herman Alfred de Stern, Baron Michelham, the son of Herbert Stern, 1st Baron Michelham. His father's elder brother was Monsignor Thomas John Capel, a Roman Catholic priest of the Archdiocese of Westminster who was mired in scandal during the 1880s.

In the obituary of one of Capel's daughters, he was described as "an intellectual, politician, tycoon, polo-player and the dashing lover and sponsor of the fashion designer Coco Chanel". According to that obituary, Capel was a Roman Catholic and his wife had converted to Catholicism in order to marry him, and their two daughters were raised as Roman Catholics. There are hints in biographies of Chanel about Capel's reputed (illegitimate) connections with the Capel Earls of Essex, but no connection has been established.

Capel's father and grandfather were born in Kent. His paternal grandfather served in the Navy, marrying and starting a family in County Waterford, Ireland, during his service. His grandfather joined HM Coastguard, following his navy service, and was posted to the coastguard station at the Sizewell Gap in Suffolk.

An alumnus of Beaumont College, he was a shipping merchant and already an apparently wealthy self-made man by 1909. In the 1919 New Year Honours, Capel, as political assistant secretary to the British Section of the Supreme War Council, Versailles, was appointed Commander of the Order of the British Empire (CBE).

Capel was killed in an automobile accident on 22 December 1919, supposedly en route to a Christmas rendezvous with Chanel. He was buried with full military honours at Fréjus Cathedral on 24 December 1919. A roadside memorial was placed at the site of the accident, consisting of a cross bearing the inscription: "A la mémoire du capitaine Arthur Capel, légion d'Honneur de l'armée britannique, mort accidentellement en cet endroit le 22 décembre 1919." The memorial is said to have been commissioned by Chanel. Twenty-five years after the event, Chanel, then residing in Switzerland, confided to her friend, Paul Morand, "His death was a terrible blow to me. In losing Capel, I lost everything. What followed was not a life of happiness, I have to say."

== Capel and Chanel ==
His affair with Chanel apparently began in 1909, when he became acquainted with the then 26-year-old mistress of his friend Étienne Balsan. Capel financed Chanel's first shops and his own clothing style, notably his blazers, inspired her creation of the Chanel look. The couple spent time together at fashionable resorts such as Deauville, but he was never faithful to Chanel. Their relationship lasted nine years, and even after Capel married he continued his affair with Chanel until his death.

== Marriage and children ==
In 1918, Capel married Diana Wyndham, née Lister (born 7 May 1893–died 1983), a daughter of Lord Ribblesdale and widow of Captain Percy Lyulph Wyndham (killed in action, 1914), who was the half-brother of Hugh Grosvenor, 2nd Duke of Westminster. Diana's elder sister, Laura, was married to Lord Lovat, and another sister to Sir Mathew Wilson, 4th Baronet: her aunt Margot Tennant (1864–1945), was the second wife of Prime Minister H. H. Asquith. In 1923, after Capel's death, Diana married Vere Fane, 14th Earl of Westmorland.

They had two daughters:

- Ann Diana France Ayesha Capel (28 April 1919–4 May 2008). Ann was married three times and had children with her first two husbands. In 1940, she married firstly George Ward (1907–1988), who in 1960 was raised to the peerage as Viscount Ward of Witley. They had two children: a son, Anthony, who died unmarried at age 40, and a daughter, actress Georgina Ward (1941–2010), otherwise Mrs Patrick Tritton. They divorced in 1951. That same year, on 7 August, she married Richard Thurstan Holland-Martin (1907–1968) by whom she had two sons: Barnaby Robert (born 1952) and Giles Thurstan (1955–2008). They divorced in 1966. Ann Capel's third husband was Peter Higgins.
- June Capel (1920–2006), later Lady Hutchinson of Lullington. June was born after her father had died, apparently without his being aware of her conception. Hence there was no provision for her in his will which had to be contested to ensure that June got a share of her father's fortune (most of it subsequently stolen by a lawyer, according to Lady Hutchinson's obituary). In 1948, June Capel married Franz Osborn, by whom she had a son, Christopher. Her second marriage took place in May 1966 to Jeremy Hutchinson, QC. Hutchinson was the former husband of actress Peggy Ashcroft and was created a life peer in 1978.

== Other ==
Two years before his death, Capel had met in Paris a brilliant Pole, Józef Retinger, whom he inspired with his talk of federalism and the idea of world government based on an Anglo-French alliance. His ideas were strongly supported by Sir Henry Wilson, whose ADC he had been, and Capel aroused the interest of such statesmen as Aristide Briand, Georges Clemenceau and Woodrow Wilson. He had also promoted his ideas in Vatican diplomatic circles. Retinger helped Capel with his proposed book, The World on the Anvil. The seed had been planted in Retinger's mind and, though transformed, it arguably influenced the creation of the League of Nations and came to fruition decades later in the European Union.

== Fictional portrayals ==
- French actor Olivier Sitruk played Capel in Coco Chanel (2008), a French-Italian-British television film, starring Shirley MacLaine as an elder Chanel.
- Alessandro Nivola played Capel in the film Coco avant Chanel (2009), starring Audrey Tautou as Chanel.
- Anatole Taubman played him in Coco Chanel & Igor Stravinsky (2009).
- Timothy Dalton played him in the film Chanel Solitaire (1981).
