= Ornitz =

Ornitz is a surname. Notable people with the surname include:

- Arthur J. Ornitz (1916–1985), American cinematographer
- Don Ornitz (1920–1972), American photographer
- Samuel Ornitz (1890–1957), American screenwriter and novelist
