= Parallel Lives (film) =

- Genre: Drama; Mystery; Romance; Thriller
- Written by: Gisela Bernice; Linda Yellen
- Directed by: Linda Yellen
- Starring: JoBeth Williams; Liza Minnelli; Gena Rowlands
- Music by: Patrick Seymour
- Country of origin: United States
- Original language: English

Production
- Producer: Linda Yellen
- Production locations: California; Utah
- Cinematography: Paul Cameron
- Editors: Paul Morton; Jan Northrop
- Running time: 105 minutes
- Production companies: Showtime Networks; Sundance Institute

Original release
- Network: Showtime
- Release: August 14, 1994

Parallel Lives is a 1994 American made-for-television mystery-drama film written, directed and produced by Linda Yellen which returns some actors and similar patterns of Yellen's previous work, Chantilly Lace.

The film features an all-star cast: James Belushi, James Brolin, LeVar Burton, Lindsay Crouse, Jill Eikenberry, Ben Gazzara, Jack Klugman, Liza Minnelli, Dudley Moore, Gena Rowlands, Ally Sheedy, Helen Slater, Mira Sorvino, Paul Sorvino, Robert Wagner, Patricia Wettig, JoBeth Williams and Treat Williams.

Parallel Lives was broadcast August 14, 1994, on Showtime.

== Plot ==
A college reunion turns into a tangled web of passion, romance and intrigue as old friends and enemies catch up with each other's lives.

== Cast ==
- James Belushi as Nick Dimas
- Liza Minnelli as Stevie Merrill
- James Brolin as Professor Spencer Jones
- Helen Slater as Elsa Freedman
- LeVar Burton as Dr. Franklin Carter
- Jack Klugman as Senator Robert Ferguson
- Patricia Wettig as Rebecca Ferguson Stone
- Ben Gazzara as Charlie Duke
- Mira Sorvino as Matty Derosa
- Lindsay Crouse as Una Pace
- JoBeth Williams as Winnie Winslow
- Ally Sheedy as Louise
- Paul Sorvino as Ed Starling
- Matthew Perry as Willie Morrison
- Jill Eikenberry as Lula Sparks
- Treat Williams as Peter Barnum
- Dudley Moore as Imaginary Friend / President Andrews
- Gena Rowlands as Francie Pomerantz
- Robert Wagner as the sheriff
- Michael O'Rourke as Kirk O'Brien
- Alan Feinstein as Dan Merrill

== Production ==
The movie was developed by Yellen with the assistance of the Sundance Institute. As with Chantilly Lace, it uses "guided improvisations" with the actors, after receiving some general character outlines, free to improvise.

Parts of the film were shot in Salt Lake City, Utah, and California.

== Reception ==
The movie received mixed reviews. New York Times critic John Leonard argued: "'Parallel Lives' is injured in its lightness of being by Yellen's added structure. But until it sinks in murky narrative waters, it's a marvel of raw edges and wild wit and surprise cunning, of craft that goes up like a kite to catch some lightning." The Variety critic Ray Loynd wrote: "When the movie works best (...), this is a movie that tends to make The Big Chill look sodden."

On the other hand, Lynne Heffley opened her review for the Los Angeles Times with these words: "From the sublime to the ridiculous... and the ridiculous has the edge in 'Parallel Lives.' Jerry Roberts in his Encyclopedia of Television Film Directors defined the film as "a cattle call at the actors unemployment line" and film critic Lewis Beale in his video review for the New York Daily News claimed that: "Linda Yellen's film wants to be hip, moving and Robert Altmanesque (overlapping dialogue and an improvisational feel), but it's simply tedious and stupid."
