= Jacqueline Bisset =

British actress (born 1944)

- Bisset in 2026
- Born: Winifred Jacqueline Fraser Bisset; 13 September 1944 (age 82); Weybridge, Surrey, England
- Occupation: Actress
- Years active: 1965–present
- Partners: Michael Sarrazin (1967–1973); Victor Drai (1974–1980); Alexander Godunov (1981–1988); Vincent Perez (1988–1992); Emin Boztepe (1994–2005; 2007–2008)

Winifred Jacqueline Fraser Bisset (/ˈbɪsɪt/ BISS-it; born 13 September 1944) is a British actress. She began her film career in 1965 and came to prominence in 1968 with roles in The Detective, Bullitt, and The Sweet Ride, for which she received a Golden Globe nomination as Most Promising Newcomer. In the 1970s, she starred in Airport (1970), The Mephisto Waltz (1971), Day for Night (1973), which won the Academy Award for Best Foreign Language Film, Le Magnifique (1973), Murder on the Orient Express (1974), St. Ives (1976), The Deep (1977), The Greek Tycoon (1978) and Who Is Killing the Great Chefs of Europe? (1978), which earned her a Golden Globe nomination as Best Actress – Motion Picture Comedy or Musical.

Bisset's other film and TV credits include Rich and Famous (1981), Class (1983), her Golden Globe-nominated role in Under the Volcano (1984), her CableACE Award-nominated role in Forbidden (1985), Scenes from the Class Struggle in Beverly Hills (1989), Wild Orchid (1990), her Cesar Award-nominated role in La Cérémonie (1995), Dangerous Beauty (1998), her Emmy-nominated role in the miniseries Joan of Arc (1999), Britannic (2000), The Sleepy Time Gal (2001), Domino (2005), a guest arc in the fourth season of Nip/Tuck (2006), Death in Love (2008), and the BBC miniseries Dancing on the Edge (2013), for which she won a Golden Globe Award for Best Supporting Actress – Series, Miniseries or Television Film.

Bisset has since appeared in Welcome to New York (2014), Miss You Already (2015), The Last Film Festival (2016), Backstabbing for Beginners (2018) and Birds of Paradise (2021). She received France's highest honour, the Legion of Honour, in 2010. She speaks English, French, and Italian.

== Early life ==
Bisset was born Winifred Jacqueline Fraser Bisset in Weybridge, Surrey, England, the daughter of George Maxwell Fraser Bisset (1911–1982), a general practitioner, and Arlette Alexander (1914–1999), a lawyer-turned-housewife. Her mother was of French and English descent and her father was of Scottish descent; Bisset's mother cycled from Paris and boarded a British troopship to escape the Germans during the 1940 Battle of France.

Bisset grew up in a 17th-century country cottage in Tilehurst, near Reading, Berkshire. She has an elder brother, Max (born 1942), a Florida-based business consultant; they have a paternal half-brother named Nick (born circa 1981), who was an infant when their father died aged 70. Her mother taught her to speak French fluently, and she was educated at the Lycée Français de Londres in London. She took ballet lessons as a child and began taking acting lessons while working as a fashion model to pay for them. When Bisset was a teenager, her mother was diagnosed with multiple sclerosis.

Bisset's parents divorced in 1968 after 28 years of marriage.

== Career ==
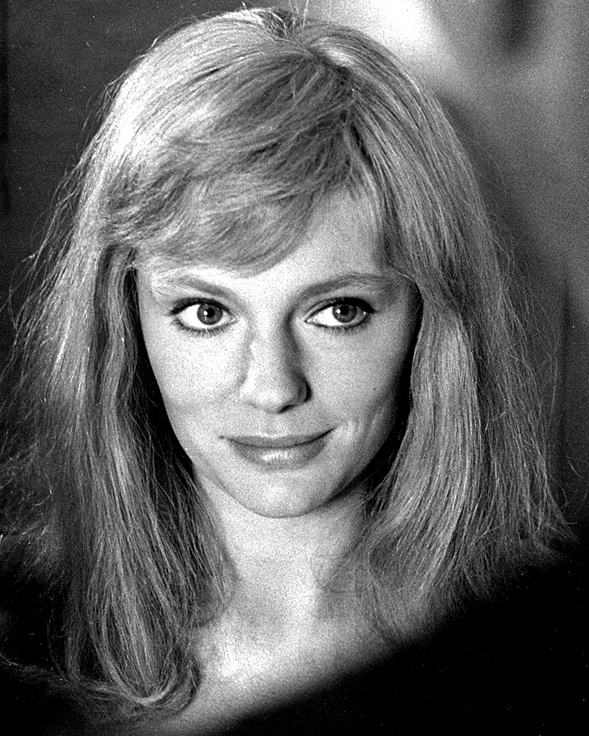
Bisset in 1968

=== 1960s ===
Bisset first appeared uncredited as a prospective model in The Knack ...and How to Get It (1965), directed by Richard Lester. She made her official debut the following year in Roman Polanski's Cul-de-sac (1966). In 1967, Bisset had her first noticeable part in the Albert Finney/Audrey Hepburn vehicle Two for the Road, as a woman in whom Finney's character is romantically interested. It was made by 20th Century Fox, which put her under contract. She had a more sizeable role in the James Bond satire Casino Royale, as Miss Goodthighs.

Fox cast Bisset in her first lead part in The Cape Town Affair (1967), opposite a then-unknown James Brolin, filmed in South Africa on a low budget. She gained mainstream recognition in 1968, when she replaced Mia Farrow in The Detective opposite Frank Sinatra. The same year, she co-starred with Michael Sarrazin in The Sweet Ride, which brought her a Golden Globe nomination for Most Promising Newcomer. She capped her year as Steve McQueen's girlfriend in the police drama Bullitt, which was among the top five highest-grossing films of the year. In 1969, Bisset was top billed in The First Time and Secret World, appearing as a blonde in the latter.

=== 1970s ===
In 1970, Bisset was one of many stars in the disaster film Airport; her role was that of a pregnant stewardess carrying Dean Martin's love child. It was a huge hit. Bisset had another starring part in The Grasshopper (1970), which was little seen, and was in The Mephisto Waltz (1971) with Alan Alda. She reteamed with real-life boyfriend Michael Sarrazin for the romantic drama Believe in Me, in which she played a drug addict, and had the lead in the comedy Stand Up and Be Counted (1972). More popular was The Life and Times of Judge Roy Bean (1972), in which she played the daughter of Paul Newman's title character. She played the female lead in The Thief Who Came to Dinner (1973) with Ryan O'Neal, stepping in for a pregnant Charlotte Rampling.

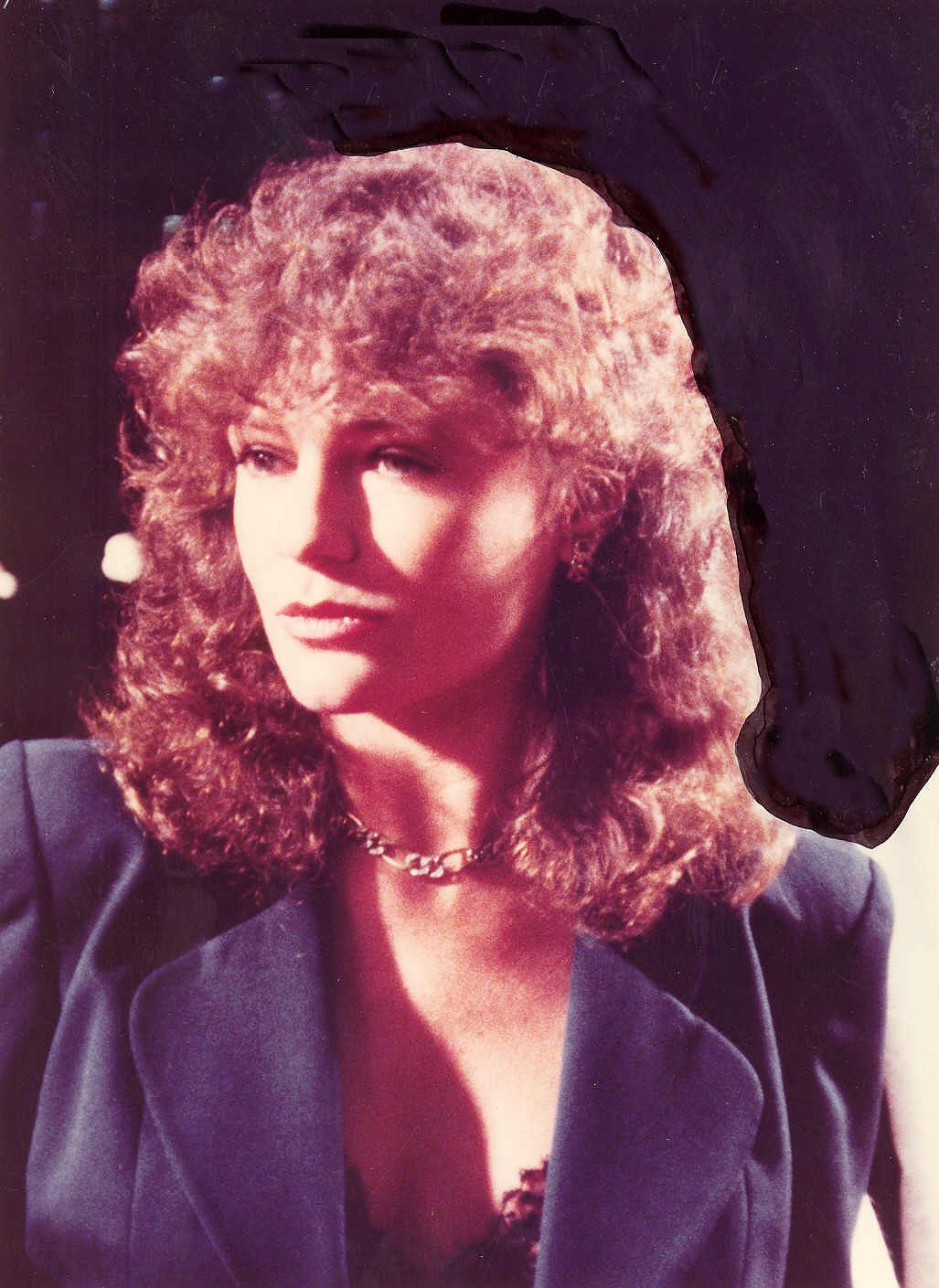
Bisset in 1979

Bisset went to France to appear in François Truffaut's Day for Night (1973), earning the respect of European critics and moviegoers as a serious actress. She stayed in France to make Le Magnifique (1973) with Jean-Paul Belmondo, a hit in France but little seen in English-speaking countries. She was one of many stars in Sidney Lumet's whodunnit Murder on the Orient Express (1974), an enormous success. In Britain, she starred in a remake of The Spiral Staircase (1975). Bisset went to Germany for End of the Game (1975), co-starring Jon Voight. In Italy, she played the main character in Luigi Comencini's The Sunday Woman (1975) opposite Marcello Mastroianni. She returned to Hollywood to support Charles Bronson in St. Ives (1976).

In 1977, Bisset gained wide publicity in America with The Deep, directed by Peter Yates, who had previously directed her in Bullitt. A marketing strategy based around Bisset appearing in some scenes underwater wearing only a white T-shirt for a top helped make the film a box-office success. Producer Peter Guber allegedly quipped, "That T-shirt made me a rich man!" Many credit her with popularising wet T-shirt contests, but Bisset herself was disappointed that the marketing of her translucent costume detracted from the film's technical achievements. About that time, a UK production, Secrets, that Bisset had made in 1971 was re-released in the United States. That movie featured the only extensive nude scenes of Bisset's career and the producers cashed in on her notoriety.

By 1978, Bisset was a household name. She earned a Golden Globe nomination that year as Best Actress – Motion Picture Comedy for her performance opposite George Segal in Who Is Killing the Great Chefs of Europe?, and starred with Anthony Quinn in The Greek Tycoon, playing a role based on Jackie Onassis. After these she made Together? (1979) in Italy with Terence Stamp and Maximilian Schell.

=== 1980s ===
Bisset appeared in some all-star films: When Time Ran Out (1980), starring alongside Paul Newman and William Holden, and Inchon (1981), with Ben Gazzara. Her fee around this time was $1 million a movie. Both When Time Ran Out and Inchon were big flops.

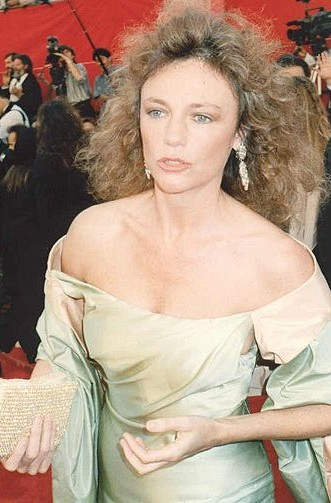
Bisset at the 1989 Academy Awards

More popular was George Cukor's Rich and Famous (1981) with Candice Bergen, where Bisset also served as co-producer. One of her best-known roles came in the coming-of-age comedy Class (1983), as a married woman having an affair with her son's (Rob Lowe) prep school roommate (Andrew McCarthy). Bisset received her third Golden Globe nomination for John Huston's Under the Volcano (1984) in the Best Supporting Actress category.

In 1984 Bisset made the wartime drama Forbidden with Jürgen Prochnow, and earned a CableACE Award nomination as Best Actress. For television she played the title role in Anna Karenina (1985), opposite Christopher Reeve, and did an abortion drama, Choices (1986). Bisset portrayed Joséphine de Beauharnais in the miniseries Napoleon and Josephine: A Love Story (1987) with Armand Assante. She also had the lead in some comedies: High Season (1987) and Scenes from the Class Struggle in Beverly Hills (1989), taking over for Faye Dunaway due to scheduling conflicts. Between those she made La maison de jade (1988) in France with Vincent Perez. She was Carré Otis' boss in the erotic thriller Wild Orchid (1989) starring Mickey Rourke.

=== 1990s ===
During the early 1990s, Bisset shot projects on multiple continents, co-starring in Mario Monicelli's Rossini! Rossini! (1991), a biopic of Italian composer Gioachino Rossini; with Martin Sheen for a Paris-set TV movie called The Maid (1991); with Elliott Gould in the Dutch miniseries Hoffman's honger (1993); with Jean-Hugues Anglade in the French language film Les marmottes (1993); and with one of Japan's top stars, Masaya Kato in the Australian TV film Crimebroker (1993). "I used to work [in the states] a lot, and then I started to go and do more of the intimate little films I wanted to do that I didn't find here," she said in 1994. "I started to have two lives, really. I was able to cover more of the ground that I wanted to as an actress. But now I need to do more things that get seen." Bisset returned to North American screens with the TV film Leave of Absence (1994), opposite Brian Dennehy.

In 1995, Bisset was nominated for a César Award for her role in the French film La Cérémonie, directed by Claude Chabrol. She did a couple of period pieces, playing a spinster in 1890s New York in Linda Yellen's End of Summer (1997), and a retired courtesan in 16th-century Venice in Dangerous Beauty (1998) with Catherine McCormack.

In 1999, Bisset appeared in two high-calibre television projects, playing the Virgin Mary in Jesus and Isabelle d'Arc in Joan of Arc, opposite Jeremy Sisto and Leelee Sobieski in the respective titular roles. Bisset earned a Primetime Emmy Award nomination as Best Supporting Actress for the latter performance. Let the Devil Wear Black (1999) was an independent film featuring Bisset in an ensemble cast, loosely retelling Shakespeare's Hamlet in modern-day Los Angeles.

=== 2000s ===
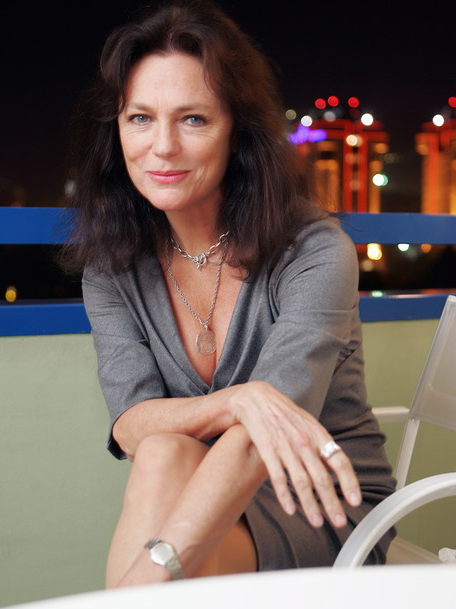
Bisset in 2007

Bisset returned to the Biblical genre with In the Beginning (2000), playing Sarah, wife of Abraham. She had the leading role in Christopher Münch's The Sleepy Time Gal (2001), in which she gave an understated portrayal of a terminally ill woman trying to put her life in order. Co-starring Nick Stahl, Seymour Cassel and Amy Madigan, The Sleepy Time Gal premiered on SundanceTV and was cited by the Village Voice in its annual survey of the year's best undistributed films. Bisset described it as her best work. One of her later TV movies, in 2003, was America's Prince: The John F. Kennedy Jr. Story, in which she portrayed Jacqueline Bouvier Kennedy Onassis. She did guest shots on Hey Arnold!, Ally McBeal and Law & Order: Special Victims Unit, and had key roles in the independent features Swing (2003), Latter Days (2003) and Fascination (2004).

In 2005, Bisset was seen in the Domino Harvey biographical film Domino with Keira Knightley, directed by Tony Scott, playing a fictionalised version of Paulene Stone (renamed "Sophie Wynn"), whom she actually knew from their time as models in London. She filmed a cameo appearance for Mr. & Mrs. Smith, but her performance was cut from the movie. In 2006, Bisset had a recurring role on the FX series Nip/Tuck as the ruthless extortionist James LeBeau. Her next role was in Save the Last Dance 2 (2006) as the protagonist's ballet instructor. On Lifetime she appeared in an adaption of the Nora Roberts novel Carolina Moon (2007).

Bisset starred in the lead role of Boaz Yakin's Death in Love, which premiered at the 2008 Sundance Film Festival. Her performance as a volatile Holocaust survivor earned her the Best Actress award at the Boston Film Festival. Later that year, she starred in An Old Fashioned Thanksgiving for the Hallmark Channel, and was nominated for a Satellite Award as Best Actress.

In 2009, Bisset reunited with Linda Yellen for The Last Film Festival, which was Dennis Hopper's final screen appearance. Hopper's untimely death in spring 2010 occurred before Yellen could begin postproduction, and she eventually launched a crowd-funding campaign to complete the film. It finally premiered in 2016.

=== 2010s ===
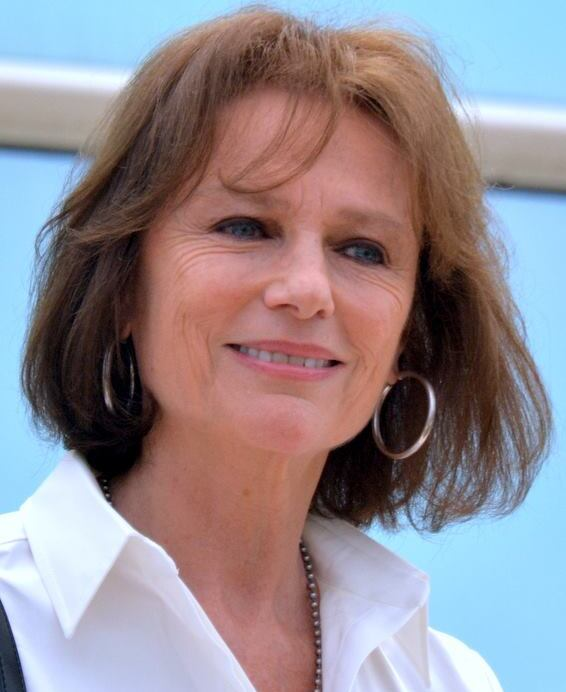
Bisset at the 2017 Cannes Film Festival

In 2010, Bisset was awarded the Legion of Honour insignia, with French President Nicolas Sarkozy calling her "a movie icon". Later that year she reprised her role in the sequel to An Old Fashioned Thanksgiving, An Old Fashioned Christmas.

Following a recurring role on Rizzoli & Isles from 2011 to 2012, Bisset returned to the UK to film Stephen Poliakoff's 1930s jazz drama series Dancing on the Edge, which started on BBC2 in 2013. For her work, she won the Golden Globe Award for Best Supporting Actress – Series, Miniseries or Television Film. Next, she played Gérard Depardieu's wife in Welcome to New York (2014) for controversial director Abel Ferrara. In 2015, she co-starred with Drew Barrymore and Toni Collette in Miss You Already. The same year, she received a Stanislavsky Award at the 37th Moscow International Film Festival.

Bisset had a recurring role in the American TV series Counterpart in 2017. On the indie circuit, Bisset kept busy with roles in four features in 2018: Head Full of Honey, which reunited her with The Deep co-star Nick Nolte; Backstabbing for Beginners (opposite Ben Kingsley); Here and Now with Sarah Jessica Parker; and Asher with Famke Janssen and Ron Perlman. In 2019, she co-starred with Fabio Testi in the Lifetime movie Very Valentine.

=== 2020s ===
In 2020, Bisset joined the cast of Birds of Paradise from Amazon Studios, shot in Budapest. She had a co-starring role in the fantasy/horror film The Lodger alongside Alice Isaaz, and plays a title role in Russell Brown's Loren & Rose (2022) with Kelly Blatz and Paul Sand.

In 2022, Bisset was honoured by the Coronado Island Film Festival with the "Cultural Icon Award". She starred with Dominic Monaghan in Long Shadows (2024), which marked her first western since The Life and Times of Judge Roy Bean.

== Public image ==
Bisset has enjoyed considerable media visibility in her long career, gracing more than 300 magazine covers. To coincide with the release of The Deep, Newsweek voted her "the most beautiful film actress of all time". In 1989, the year she headlined Paul Bartel's risqué comedy Scenes from the Class Struggle in Beverly Hills, the New York Daily News published an article about her titled "Bad Girl Bisset". In 2010, Bisset began appearing in broadcast and print advertisements for Avon's Anew Platinum line of skin care.

Bisset is referenced in the song "Clifton in the Rain" from the album Bed-Sitter Images, by Al Stewart. She was also mentioned in the episode "Bar Bet" of NBC's Cheers, as well as two cable television programmes starring Garry Shandling: It's Garry Shandling's Show and The Larry Sanders Show.

Forbes pointed out that, despite her status as a heterosexual sex symbol, Bisset incidentally has acquired a loyal gay fanbase, which the actress herself was unaware of for many years. Its origin goes back to as early as 1968, when she played the widow of a bisexual suicide in The Detective. Several of her subsequent films have featured LGBT characters, from The Grasshopper through Loren & Rose, with Bisset even playing one herself on Nip/Tuck.

In 2025, Bisset told Page Six, "[I'm] very unsympathetic to these stories, these #MeToo things," referring to women who came forward during the movement to report sexual abuse and sexual harassment in the workplace, particularly in Hollywood.

== Personal life ==
Bisset has never married, but had long-term romances with Canadian actor Michael Sarrazin, Moroccan real estate magnate Victor Drai, Russian dancer/actor Alexander Godunov, Swiss actor Vincent Perez and Turkish martial arts instructor Emin Boztepe.

In interviews, Bisset is often asked about being unmarried and childless. When she was 32, she told the press: "I couldn't in all conscience do what I do and have children. Could you imagine being the daughter of Raquel Welch? I've heard such horror stories, about the children in Hollywood." Bisset has been a de facto stepmother in two of her past relationships, as Sarrazin and Boztepe already had children before they met her.

Bisset is godmother to Angelina Jolie.

== Filmography ==
=== Film ===
| Year | Title | Role | Notes |
|---|---|---|---|
| 1965 | The Knack ...and How to Get It | Model | Uncredited |
| 1966 | Cul-de-sac | Jacqueline | Credited as Jackie Bisset |
| 1966 | Drop Dead Darling | Dancer | |
| 1967 | Casino Royale | Miss Giovanna Goodthighs | |
| 1967 | Two for the Road | Jackie | |
| 1967 | The Cape Town Affair | Candy | |
| 1968 | The Sweet Ride | Vickie Cartwright | Nominated—Golden Globe Award for New Star of the Year – Actress |
| 1968 | The Detective | Norma MacIver | |
| 1968 | Bullitt | Cathy | Laurel Award for Female New Face (2nd place) |
| 1969 | The First Time | Anna | |
| 1969 | Secret World | Wendy Sinclair | |
| 1970 | Airport | Gwen Meighen | |
| 1970 | The Grasshopper | Christine Adams | Nominated—Laurel Award for Best Female Dramatic Performance |
| 1971 | The Mephisto Waltz | Paula Clarkson | |
| 1971 | Believe in Me | Pamela | |
| 1971 | Secrets | Jenny | |
| 1972 | Stand Up and Be Counted | Sheila Hammond | |
| 1972 | The Life and Times of Judge Roy Bean | Rose Bean | |
| 1973 | The Thief Who Came to Dinner | Laura Keaton | |
| 1973 | Day for Night | Julie Baker | |
| 1973 | Le Magnifique | Tatiana / Christine | |
| 1974 | Murder on the Orient Express | Countess Elena Andrenyi / Helena Arden | |
| 1975 | The Spiral Staircase | Helen Mallory | |
| 1975 | End of the Game | Anna Crawley | |
| 1975 | The Sunday Woman | Anna Carla Dosio | |
| 1976 | St. Ives | Janet Whistler | |
| 1977 | The Deep | Gail Berke | |
| 1978 | The Greek Tycoon | Liz Cassidy | |
| 1978 | Who Is Killing the Great Chefs of Europe? | Natasha O'Brien | Nominated—Golden Globe Award for Best Actress – Motion Picture Comedy or Musical |
| 1979 | Together? | Louise | |
| 1980 | When Time Ran Out | Kay Kirby | |
| 1981 | Inchon | Barbara Hallsworth | |
| 1981 | Rich and Famous | Liz Hamilton | |
| 1983 | Class | Ellen Burroughs | |
| 1984 | Under the Volcano | Yvonne Firmin | Nominated—Golden Globe Award for Best Supporting Actress – Motion Picture |
| 1987 | High Season | Katherine Shaw | |
| 1988 | La maison de Jade | Jane Lambert | |
| 1989 | Scenes from the Class Struggle in Beverly Hills | Clare Lipkin | |
| 1990 | Wild Orchid | Claudia Dennis | |
| 1991 | Rossini! Rossini! | Isabella Colbran | |
| 1993 | Les marmottes | Frédérique | |
| 1995 | La Cérémonie | Catherine Lelievre | Nominated—César Award for Best Supporting Actress |
| 1998 | Dangerous Beauty | Paola Franco | |
| 1999 | Let the Devil Wear Black | Helen Lyne | |
| 2000 | Les Gens qui s'aiment | Angie | |
| 2001 | The Sleepy Time Gal | Frances | |
| 2001 | New Year's Day | Geraldine | |
| 2003 | Latter Days | Lila Montagne | |
| 2003 | Swing | Christine / Mrs. DeLuca | |
| 2004 | Fascination | Maureen Doherty | |
| 2005 | The Fine Art of Love | Headmistress | |
| 2005 | Domino | Sophie Wynn | |
| 2006 | Save the Last Dance 2 | Monique Delacroix | Direct-to-video |
| 2008 | Death in Love | Mother | |
| 2012 | Two Jacks | Diana | |
| 2014 | Welcome to New York | Simone Devereaux | |
| 2015 | Peter and John | Julia Roland | |
| 2015 | Miss You Already | Miranda | |
| 2016 | The Last Film Festival | Claudia Benvenuti | |
| 2017 | L'Amant double | Mrs. Schenker | |
| 2017 | 9/11 | Diane | |
| 2018 | Backstabbing for Beginners | Christina Dupre | |
| 2018 | Here and Now | Jeanne | |
| 2018 | Asher | Dora | |
| 2018 | Head Full of Honey | Vivian | |
| 2021 | Birds of Paradise | Valentine Louvet | |
| 2021 | Madeleine Collins | Patty | |
| 2022 | Loren & Rose | Rose | |
| 2025 | Long Shadows | Vivian Villeré | |

=== Television ===
| Year | Title | Role | Notes |
|---|---|---|---|
| 1984 | Forbidden | Nina Von Halder | Television film Nominated—CableACE Award for Actress in a Movie or Miniseries |
| 1985 | Anna Karenina | Anna Karenina | Television film |
| 1986 | Choices | Marisa Granger | Television film |
| 1987 | Napoleon and Josephine: A Love Story | Joséphine de Beauharnais | Television miniseries |
| 1991 | The Maid | Nicole Chantrelle | Television film |
| 1993 | Crimebroker | Holly McPhee | Television film |
| 1993 | Hoffman's honger | Marian Hoffman | Television miniseries |
| 1994 | Leave of Absence | Nell | Television film |
| 1995 | End of Summer | Christine Van Buren | Television film |
| 1996 | September | Pandora | Television film |
| 1996 | Once You Meet a Stranger | Sheila Gaines | Television film |
| 1999 | Witch Hunt | Barbara Thomas | Television film |
| 1999 | Joan of Arc | Isabelle d'Arc | Television miniseries Nominated—Golden Globe Award for Best Supporting Actress – Series, Miniseries or Television Film; Nominated—Primetime Emmy Award for Outstanding Supporting Actress in a Miniseries or a Movie |
| 1999 | Jesus | Mary | Television miniseries |
| 1999 | Hey Arnold! | Madame Parvenu | Voice; episode: "Polishing Rhonda" |
| 2000 | Britannic | Lady Lewis | Television film |
| 2000 | Sex & Mrs. X | Madame Simone | Television film |
| 2000 | In the Beginning | Sarah | Television miniseries |
| 2001–2002 | Ally McBeal | Frances Shaw | 2 episodes |
| 2002 | Dancing at the Harvest Moon | Maggie Webber | Television film |
| 2003 | America's Prince: The John F. Kennedy Jr. Story | Jacqueline Kennedy Onassis | Television film |
| 2003 | Law & Order: Special Victims Unit | Juliet Barclay | Episode: "Control" |
| 2004 | The Survivors Club | Carol Rosen | Television film |
| 2005 | Summer Solstice | Alexia White | Television film |
| 2006 | Nip/Tuck | James LeBeau | 7 episodes |
| 2007 | Carolina Moon | Margaret Lavelle | Television film |
| 2008 | An Old Fashioned Thanksgiving | Isabella | Television film Nominated—Satellite Award for Best Actress – Miniseries or Television Film |
| 2009 | The Eastmans | Emma Eastman | Unsold television pilot |
| 2010 | An Old Fashioned Christmas | Isabella | Television film |
| 2011–2012 | Rizzoli & Isles | Constance Isles | 3 episodes |
| 2013 | Dancing on the Edge | Lady Lavinia Cremone | Television miniseries Golden Globe Award for Best Supporting Actress – Series, Miniseries or Television Film |
| 2017 | Graves | Diana Scott | Episode: "Something Left to Love" |
| 2018 | Counterpart | Charlotte Burton | Episode: "Love the Lie" |
| 2019 | Very Valentine | Teodora Angelini | Television film |
