= Agim Kaba =

American actor, artist and filmmaker (born 1980)

- Born: February 16, 1980 (age 46); New York City, U.S.
- Education: St. John's University
- Occupations: Actor, filmmaker
- Years active: 2001–present
- Spouse: Jaclyn Marie Cahill
- Children: 2

Agim Kaba (born February 16, 1980) is an Albanian-American actor, artist and filmmaker. He is known for his role of Aaron Snyder on As the World Turns.

== Early life ==
Kaba is an actor, realtor, artist and former footballer, currently living in Portland, Oregon. The third of four children born to Sal and Sally Kaba, his early interests were soccer and acting. While a student at Countryside High School in Florida, he was selected for Florida's Olympic Development soccer teams five years in a row. He later attended New York City's St. John's University, where he played soccer. He is of Albanian descent.

== Career ==
While a student at St. John's, Agim began as a double major in business and history before switching to fine arts, a decision that not only allowed him to hone his painting and drafting skills but would ultimately inspire him to pursue a career in television and cinema. After modeling for three years in New York and Milan, including a major campaign for Guess Jeans, Agim landed his first television role on CBS's As the World Turns in April 2002. In March 2004, the then 24–year old actor received his first Daytime Emmy nomination, in the category Outstanding Younger Actor in a Drama Series. Kaba continued to play the role of Aaron Snyder on the long-running daytime soap opera until April 2005, later returning to the series in June 2007.

He has also made guest appearances on the television series Charmed and CSI: NY. Having already executive produced the award-winning short film Happy Ending, Agim landed starring roles in the low-budget horror films Haunted Forest and Neowolf before getting his big break on The Last Film Festival, where he worked opposite Dennis Hopper, Leelee Sobieski, and Chris Kattan. In 2010, he signed on to film Nomads, directed by Ricardo Benet, starring Lucy Liu.

In 2012, Kaba co-starred on the ABC drama pilot Americana as Jordan, directed by Phillip Noyce. However, the pilot was not picked up.

=== Television ===
- As the World Turns as Aaron Snyder (2002–2005, 2007–2009)
- CSI: NY (2005)
- Charmed (2005)
- The Bay (2011)
- Americana (2012)

=== Filmography ===
Year	Film	Role	Note(s)
2001	3 Ceilings	Stud	
2007	Haunted Forest	J.R	
2009	Neowolf	Vince	
2010	An American Hero	Jesus/Christian	
2010	Nomads	Actor	
2011	Impostor	Ray/Arthur	
2012	Americana	Jordan	
2014	The Last Film Festival	Young Star	

== Awards and nominations ==
Daytime Emmy Awards

- Nominated: Outstanding Younger Actor in a Drama Series, As the World Turns (2004)

Soap Opera Digest Awards

- Nominated: Outstanding Younger Lead Actor, As the World Turns (2005)
