= Paul Cameron (cinematographer) =

Canadian-born American cinematographer

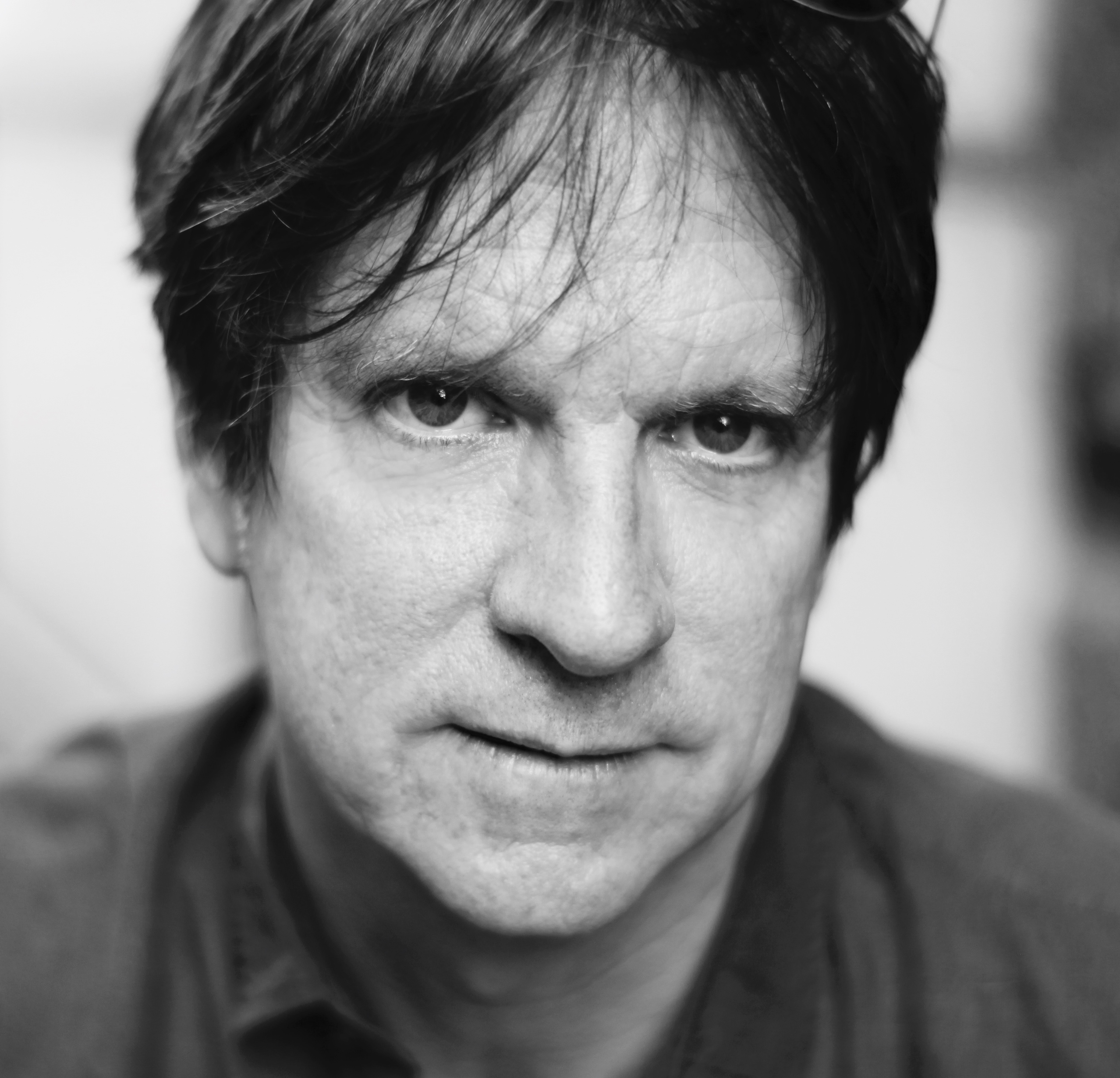
- Born: May 30, 1958 (age 68); Montreal, Quebec, Canada
- Occupations: Cinematographer; television director
- Years active: 1981–present
- Website: paulcamerondp.com/about/

Paul A. Cameron ASC (born May 30, 1958) is a Canadian-born American cinematographer and television director.

He won the BAFTA Award for Best Cinematography (shared with Dion Beebe) for his work on Michael Mann's film Collateral (2004), along with two Primetime Emmy Award nominations for his work on the HBO series Westworld (2016–2022).

== Early life and education ==
Cameron was born in Montreal, but was raised in New York City.

He studied at the State University of New York at Purchase.

He cites Gordon Willis as one of his primary influences.

== Career ==
After working as cinematographer for a number of movies throughout the 2000s and 2010s, mainly action thrillers, Cameron shifted to a career as a television director.

Cameron is on the Board of Governors for The Academy of Motion Picture Arts and Sciences, has won Clio, Emmy, AICP awards as well as a BAFTA, and is represented by DDA.

== Filmography ==
=== Film ===
Year	Title	Director	Notes
1988	Distribution of Lead	Charles Libin	
1995	The Last Supper	Stacy Title	
1999	Advice from a Caterpillar	Don Scardino	
2000	Gone in 60 Seconds	Dominic Sena	
2001	Swordfish	Dominic Sena	
2004	Man on Fire	Tony Scott	
2004	Collateral	Michael Mann	With Dion Beebe
2006	Déjà Vu	Tony Scott	
2007	In the Land of Women	Jonathan Kasdan	
2010	Henry's Crime	Malcolm Venville	
2012	Man on a Ledge	Asger Leth	
2012	Total Recall	Len Wiseman	
2013	Dead Man Down	Niels Arden Oplev	
2017	Pirates of the Caribbean: Dead Men Tell No Tales	Joachim Rønning; Espen Sandberg	
2018	The Commuter	Jaume Collet-Serra	
2019	21 Bridges	Brian Kirk	
2021	Reminiscence	Lisa Joy	

=== Television ===
Cinematographer

Year	Title	Director	Notes
1981	TV - CBGB	Eddy Carabello	TV special; With Brian Elba and Jack Kney
1993	Chantilly Lace	Linda Yellen	TV movie
1994	Parallel Lives	Linda Yellen	TV movie
1996	Relativity	Mark Piznarski	Episode "Pilot"
1997	Michael Hayes	Thomas Carter	"Episode One"
2016–2020	Westworld	Jonathan Nolan	Episodes "The Original" and "Parce Domine"
2023	Special Ops: Lioness	John Hillcoat	Episodes "Sacrificial Soldiers" and "The Beating"

Director

Year	Title	Episodes
2020–2022	Westworld	"The Mother of Exiles"
2020–2022	Westworld	"Generation Loss"
2023	Special Ops: Lioness	"Truth Is the Shrewdest Lie"
2023	Special Ops: Lioness	"The Lie Is the Truth"
2024	Mayor of Kingstown	"Iris"
2024	Mayor of Kingstown	"Ecotone"
2025–2026	The Terminal List: Dark Wolf	"E&E"
2025–2026	The Terminal List: Dark Wolf	"Pawns & Kings"
2025–2026	The Terminal List: Dark Wolf	"The Wolf You Feed"
2025–2026	The Terminal List: Dark Wolf	TBA (S02E02)

=== Music video ===
Year	Title	Artist	Director
1993	"Hard Act to Follow"	Brother Cane	David Hogan
1994	"Can't Hurry the Harvest"	Katey Sagal	David Hogan
2002	"How Come You Don't Call Me"	Alicia Keys	Director X
2002	"Gangsta Lovin'"	Eve ft. Alicia Keys	Director X
2003	"Can't Nobody"	Kelly Rowland	Benny Boom
2017	"...Ready for It?"	Taylor Swift	Joseph Kahn

== Awards and nominations ==
Year	Award	Category	Title	Result	Notes
2004	BAFTA Awards	Best Cinematography	Collateral	Won	Shared with Dion Beebe
2004	Los Angeles Film Critics Association	Best Cinematography	Collateral	Won	Shared with Dion Beebe
2004	American Society of Cinematographers	Outstanding Cinematography	Collateral	Nominated	Shared with Dion Beebe
2004	National Society of Film Critics	Best Cinematography	Collateral	Nominated	Shared with Dion Beebe
2004	Online Film Critics Society	Best Cinematography	Collateral	Nominated	Shared with Dion Beebe
2016	Primetime Emmy Awards	Outstanding Cinematography	Westworld	Nominated	For episode "The Original"
2020	Primetime Emmy Awards	Outstanding Cinematography	Westworld	Nominated	For episode "Parce Domine"
