= The Last Film Festival =

- Theatrical release poster
- Directed by: Linda Yellen
- Written by: Linda Yellen; Michael Leeds
- Produced by: Bill Blum; Andrew Goldstein; Bob Jorissen; Linda Yellen
- Starring: Dennis Hopper; Chris Kattan; Jacqueline Bisset
- Cinematography: Mauricio Rubinstein
- Edited by: Bob Jorissen
- Music by: Patrick Seymour
- Distributed by: Monterey Media
- Release date: September 30, 2016 (Los Angeles)
- Running time: 90 minutes
- Country: United States
- Language: English
- Budget: $650,000

The Last Film Festival is a 2016 American comedy film starring Dennis Hopper, Leelee Sobieski, Katrina Bowden, Chris Kattan, and Jacqueline Bisset. It is written and directed by Linda Yellen. It was filmed in 2010. Hopper died before finishing the film. After extensive delays, the film was finally released theatrically in Los Angeles on September 30, 2016, followed by a VOD release. Monterey Media acquired the distribution rights in June 2016.

This was Hopper's final appearance posthumously, next to Alpha and Omega, as well as Sobieski's final credited performance before her retirement from acting in 2012.

== Plot synopsis ==
There are over 4,000 film festivals around the world. Where would you go if your film was turned down by 3,999 of them? When an obscure film festival is the last hope for a failing producer (Dennis Hopper) and his "disaster" of a film collides with the homespun innocence of small-town America, neither will ever be the same. Nick will do anything to get his film distributed, including manipulating his dysfunctional cast into attending the festival where Hollywood egos hilariously slam into small town politics.

== Cast ==
- Dennis Hopper as Nick Twain
- Jacqueline Bisset as Claudia Benvenuti, Movie Star
- Leelee Sobieski as The Stalker
- JoBeth Williams as the Mayor
- Chris Kattan as Harvey
- Donnell Rawlings as Jermaine Johnson
- Katrina Bowden as Young Starlet
- Agim Kaba as Star
- Joseph Cross as Agent
- Crystal Burton as Jessica, High School Student
- Brian Berrebbi as Supermarket Manager

== Reception ==
Liz Smith from The New York Social Diary called the film a "hugely amusing indie", while the Huffington Post called it a "laugh-out-loud riot."
