= Haunted Forest =

Haunted Forest may refer to:

- Haunted Forest (2007 film), an American horror film
- Haunted Forest (2017 film), a Filipino supernatural horror film
