= Northern Lights (1997 film) =

- Film poster
- Based on: The 1988 stage play by John Hoffman
- Screenplay by: John Hoffman; Kevin Kane
- Directed by: Linda Yellen
- Starring: Diane Keaton; Maury Chaykin; Joseph Cross; Kathleen York; John Hoffman
- Music by: Patrick Seymour
- Country of origin: United States
- Original language: English

Production
- Executive producers: Diane Keaton; Robert Lantos; Bill Robinson; Meg Ryan; Nina Sadowsky; Laura Pozmantier
- Producer: Warren Carr
- Cinematography: Joseph Yacoe
- Editor: Jan Northrop
- Running time: 111 minutes
- Production companies: Alliance Communications; Blue Relief Productions; Walt Disney Television; Prufrock Pictures

Original release
- Network: Disney Channel
- Release: August 23, 1997

Northern Lights is a 1997 drama television film based upon the 1988 stage play of the same name by John Hoffman. Directed by Linda Yellen, the film stars Diane Keaton, Maury Chaykin, Joseph Cross, and Kathleen York. It was produced for the Disney Channel and premiered on August 23, 1997. Some sources identify Northern Lights as the first Disney Channel Original Movie, though Northern Lights was not included in Disney Channel's 100 Original Movies celebration that aired in May–June 2016, and Disney Channel considers 1997's Under Wraps to be the first official Disney Channel Original Movie.

Because her character was depicted as a heavy smoker, actress Diane Keaton thought production of the film was an odd choice for the Disney Channel.

== Plot ==
Childless widow Roberta Blumstein (Diane Keaton) receives news of the death of her estranged brother. Upon arriving in her hometown for her brother's funeral, Roberta receives an unexpected inheritance....her nine-year-old nephew Jack (Joseph Cross). Savvy and curious, Jack and Roberta struggle to find common ground.

== Cast ==
- Diane Keaton as Roberta Blumstein
- Maury Chaykin as Ben Rubadue
- Joseph Cross as Jack
- Kathleen York as Daphne
- John Robert Hoffman as Joe Scarlotti
- Frank C. Turner as Willard
- Thomas Cavanagh as Frank
- Alexander Pollock as Billy
- David Paul Grove as Buck
- Crystal Verge as Aggie
- John R. Taylor as Arthur
- Sheila Patterson as Arlene
- Peter Wilds as Ratman
- Chilton Crane as Margaret
- Sheila Moore as Louise
- Leam Blackwood as Emily
- Zahf Paroo as Young Manager (credited as Zang Haju)
- Phillip Hazel as Sterling

== Recognition ==
- 1998, Young Artist Awards for 'Best Performance, Leading Young Actor' for Joseph Cross
