= End of Summer (1995 film) =

- Genre: Drama; Romance
- Written by: Jonathan Platnick; Linda Yellen
- Directed by: Linda Yellen
- Starring: Jacqueline Bisset; Peter Weller; Julian Sands; Amy Locane
- Theme music composer: Patrick Seymour
- Country of origin: United States
- Original language: English

Production
- Executive producers: Karen Goodwin; Ted Swanson; Linda Yellen
- Cinematography: David Bridges
- Editor: Jan Northrop
- Running time: 95 minutes
- Production companies: Hallmark Entertainment; Showtime Networks

Original release
- Network: Showtime
- Release: 1995

End of Summer is a 1995 American romantic drama film directed by Linda Yellen. It stars Jacqueline Bisset and Peter Weller and was first broadcast on Showtime. It received a limited theatrical release in 1997.

== Plot ==
Christine (Bisset) is a wealthy aristocrat in 1890s New York City. She is a spinster that unexpectedly gets another shot at love, although the opportunity is threatened by her false pride and puritanical social views.

== Cast ==
- Jacqueline Bisset as Christine Van Buren
- Peter Weller as Theo Remmington
- Julian Sands as Basil
- Amy Locane as Alice
- Elizabeth Shepherd as Vera
- Michael Hogan as The General
- Karyn Dwyer as Jenny
- Janet-Laine Green as Lucie
