= Chantilly Lace =

Chantilly Lace may refer to:

- Chantilly lace, a type of lace
- "Chantilly Lace" (song), a song by The Big Bopper
- Chantilly Lace (film), a 1993 film directed by Linda Yellen
