= The Simian Line =

2001 film by Linda Yellen

- DVD cover
- Directed by: Linda Yellen
- Written by: Linda Yellen; Michael Leeds; Gisela Bernice
- Produced by: Linda Yellen; Robert Renfield
- Starring: Harry Connick Jr. Cindy Crawford; Tyne Daly; William Hurt; Monica Keena; Samantha Mathis; Lynn Redgrave
- Cinematography: David Bridges
- Edited by: Bob Jorissen
- Music by: Patrick Seymour
- Distributed by: Gabriel Film Group
- Release date: November 16, 2001
- Running time: 106 minutes
- Country: United States
- Language: English

The Simian Line is a 2001 American improvisational film released in New York City and Los Angeles. It was filmed over an eleven-day period. The ensemble cast includes Harry Connick Jr., Cindy Crawford, Tyne Daly, William Hurt, Monica Keena, Samantha Mathis, Lynn Redgrave, Jamey Sheridan and Eric Stoltz.

== Plot ==
When Katharine (Lynn Redgrave) throws a party on Halloween, a psychic called Arnita (Tyne Daly) predicts that one of the three couples present at the party will break up by the end of the year. The guests don't take her seriously. Arnita doesn't tell them that she can see a fourth couple at the party, the long dead Mae (Samantha Mathis) and Edward (William Hurt). As days go by, Katharine grows increasingly jealous of her lover Rick (Harry Connick, Jr.), and his flirting with her neighbor Sandra (Cindy Crawford). Sandra is married to Paul (Jamey Sheridan). Marta (Monica Keena) and Billy (Dylan Bruno) are rock musicians who live in the same building as Katharine.

== Music ==
- Patrick Seymour - music
- Maireid Sullivan - "The Water is Wide"
- The Mortal Sinners and Bite Me Band - "Bite Me bit*hes"
