= Hardhat and Legs =

1980 American made-for-television film

- Genre: Comedy; Drama; Romance
- Written by: Garson Kanin; Ruth Gordon
- Directed by: Lee Philips
- Starring: Kevin Dobson; Sharon Gless
- Music by: Brad Fiedel
- Country of origin: United States
- Original language: English

Production
- Producer: Linda Yellen
- Cinematography: Arthur J. Ornitz
- Editor: Lawrence Silk
- Running time: 96 minutes
- Production company: Szygzy Productions

Original release
- Network: CBS
- Release: February 9, 1980

Hardhat and Legs is a 1980 American made-for-television comedy-drama film starring Kevin Dobson and Sharon Gless. It was written by Garson Kanin and Ruth Gordon, their first collaboration since The Marrying Kind.

== Cast ==
- Kevin Dobson as Sal Pacheco
- Sharon Gless as Patricia Botsford
- Raymond Serra as Vinnie
- Charlie Aiken as Bud Botsford
- Elva Josephson as Deedee Botsford
- Jacqueline Brookes as Stella Botsford
- W.T. Martin as William Botsford
- Bobby Short as Himself
