= Jacktown (film) =

- Directed by: William Martin
- Written by: William Martin (writer)
- Produced by: William Martin (producer); Robert Stanley (associate producer)
- Starring: See below
- Cinematography: Arthur J. Ornitz
- Edited by: Ralph Rosenblum
- Music by: Aldo Provenzano
- Release date: 1962
- Running time: 62 minutes
- Country: United States
- Language: English

Jacktown is a 1962 American film directed by William Martin.

== Plot summary ==
A young delinquent named Frankie gets arrested for statutory rape after being caught in flagrante with a fifteen-year-old girl in the back seat of his car.

He claims his innocence since he didn't know she was under age. Despite this, Frankie is convicted and sentenced to prison for 2 1/2 to 5 years. The sentence is to be served in Jackson State Prison (“Jacktown”) in Michigan.

Because of the crime he is convicted for, he is unpopular among the other prisoners. To release the tension his presence builds up in the correctional facility, Frankie is put on gardening duty in the warden living quarters.

While gardening, Frankie meets the warden's daughter, Margaret, and they fall in love with each other. When the warden learns about Frankie's relation with his daughter he moves him to another position, as chauffeur outside the prison walls.

There is a prison riot inside while Frankie is outside driving a prisoner. The guard who is along on the ride is overpowered by the other prisoner and Frankie gets a chance to escape.

As a fugitive, Frankie goes to Margaret, but she convinces him to turn himself in, promising to wait for him until he is properly released and a free man.

== Cast ==
- Patty McCormack as Margaret
- Richard Meade as Frances "Frankie" Stossel
- George Taylor as himself
- Douglas Rutherford as Warden
- Russ Paquette as Vince "Vinnie"
- Mike Tancredi as Mike
- Joanna Douglas as Mrs. Stossel
- Gordon Grant as Lefty
- John Anthony as Dutch
- Joseph Julian as narrator
- James Maley Sr. as Bailiff

== See also ==
- List of American films of 1962
