= The Absence of Field =

- Westworld episode
- Episode no.: Season 3 Episode 3
- Directed by: Amanda Marsalis
- Written by: Denise Thé
- Cinematography by: Zoë White
- Editing by: Ali Comperchio
- Production code: 303
- Original air date: March 29, 2020
- Running time: 60 minutes

Guest appearances
- Tommy Flanagan as Martin Conells; Michael Ealy as Jake; Scott Mescudi as Francis; Pom Klementieff as Martel; Nadine Lewington as Gerhart; Jaxon Williams as Nathan; Remington Hoffman as Gibbons; Katy M. O’Brian as EMT; Lawrence Adimora as Second EMT; Russell Wong as Brompton; Payman Maadi as Elliot; Derek Smith as Stanton; Sol Landerman as Clyde

Episode chronology
← Previous "The Winter Line"	Next → "The Mother of Exiles"

"The Absence of Field" is the third episode in the third season of the HBO science fiction dystopian thriller television series Westworld. The episode aired on March 29, 2020. It was written by Denise Thé, and directed by Amanda Marsalis.

== Plot summary ==
In a flashback, the human Charlotte records a message and song for her son Nathan amid the host revolt in Westworld. Later, Dolores makes the Charlotte host body and inserts one of the host control units she smuggled out of Westworld, and explains to the unrevealed host that they must pretend to be Charlotte so they can run Delos to protect the few surviving hosts.

Caleb assists EMTs in transporting Dolores to the hospital but notices individuals hired through the Rico app tailing them. He helps protect her from these pursuers, and as she departs, she advises Caleb to go into hiding. Subsequently, Caleb visits his mother for a final time, realizing he has become a target wanted on Rico.

In the present, Charlotte discovers that Serac is aggressively acquiring Delos shares to access its data. Returning home, she faces criticism from her ex-husband, Jake, for neglecting to pick up their son Nathan from school. The following day, Charlotte learns that assets are missing from the park, likely due to an insider working for Serac. Anxiety sets in, and she arranges to meet with Dolores, who notices the host's body has suffered injuries from the strain of impersonation. While Dolores repairs the injuries, Charlotte issues a warning about Serac.

Caleb is seized by two past associates who will kill him unless he tells them where Dolores is. As Dolores checks in with the host duplicate of Martin, she learns of Caleb's situation, and arrives to save him in time. Dolores brings Caleb to understand her plans for revolution, showing how much data Incite has on him and how Rehoboam has predicted his life will end in suicide in ten years, which is why he is stuck in menial jobs. She offers him another option, to join her revolution against Serac to pull the plug on Incite. Caleb agrees to help.

At Delos, Charlotte is given the human Charlotte's recording, and she remembers to pick up Nathan. She continues to study the recording and recognizes the melody of "You Are My Sunshine" as matching tones she has received in phone messages. She uses them to unlock an unlisted number, which causes her vehicle to reroute itself to Serac's home. There, Serac demands all of the Delos' guest data that human Charlotte had promised and attempted to smuggle, (Note: As shown in the first and second seasons) but the host says she does not have the key for the encrypted data. Serac knows that key is within the host module of Dolores, and he tells Charlotte that she has little time left.

== Music ==
An instrumental cover and original version of Moses Sumney's "Doomed" was played during the final scene and also the end credits for this episode.

== Reception ==
"The Absence of Field" received highly positive reviews from critics. The episode has a 95% score on Rotten Tomatoes and has an average rating of 8.14/10, based on 21 reviews. The site's consensus reads: "Charlotte Hale's inner turmoil takes center stage in 'The Absence of Field', an episode that cleverly blurs the line between past and present, human and machine, and the two sides of a conflict that seemed all too clear so far."

The original live broadcast received 801,000 viewers, which was slightly up in viewership from the previous episode which had 778,000 viewers.
