= Lindsay Crouse =

American actress (born 1948)

- Born: Lindsay Ann Crouse; May 12, 1948 (age 78); New York City, U.S.
- Education: Radcliffe College
- Occupation: Actress
- Years active: 1972–present
- Spouses: David Mamet (m. 1977; div. 1990) Rick Blue (m. 1998)
- Children: 2, including Zosia Mamet
- Parent: Russel Crouse (father)
- Relatives: Timothy Crouse (brother); John Erskine (maternal grandfather)

Lindsay Ann Crouse (born May 12, 1948) is an American actress. She made her Broadway debut in the 1972 revival of Much Ado About Nothing and appeared in her first film in 1976 in All the President's Men. For her role in the 1984 film Places in the Heart, she received an Academy Award nomination for Best Supporting Actress. Her other films include Slap Shot (1977), Between the Lines (1977), The Verdict (1982), Prefontaine (1997), and The Insider (1999). She also had a leading role in the 1987 film House of Games, which was directed by her then-husband David Mamet. In 1996, she received a Daytime Emmy Award nomination for "Between Mother and Daughter", a CBS Schoolbreak Special episode. She is also a Grammy Award nominee.

== Early life ==
Crouse was born at Le Roy Hospital on Manhattan's Upper East Side, the daughter of Anna (née Erskine) and Russel Crouse, the playwright and librettist. Her maternal grandparents were author and educator John Erskine and his wife Pauline Ives. Lindsay Ann Crouse's full name is an intentional tribute to the Broadway writing partnership of Lindsay and Crouse, which consisted of her father and his writing partner, Howard Lindsay. The two wrote much of The Sound of Music. Their 1946 play State of the Union won that year's Pulitzer Prize for Drama. Their last collaboration was Mr. President in 1962. As Crouse has said: "In our family, the work ethic was held up as some kind of byword ... At any hour, somebody's typewriter was going."

== Career ==
After graduating from the Chapin School in 1966 and Radcliffe College in 1970, Crouse began her performing career as a modern and jazz dancer, but she soon switched to acting and made her Broadway debut in Much Ado About Nothing in 1972. She received her acting training at HB Studio in New York City.

Crouse's film career began in 1976, with small roles in television and theatrical movies. In 1977, she appeared as Lily Braden, the discontented wife of hockey player Ned Braden in Slap Shot. In 1982 she appeared as the decisive witness in The Verdict. Crouse was nominated for an Academy Award for Best Supporting Actress for her role in the 1984 movie Places in the Heart. Among her films was a starring role in House of Games, the 1987 film directed and written by her then-husband David Mamet, in which she plays Margaret Ford, a psychiatrist who is intrigued by the art of the con. "It's always hard to be directed by someone who's close to you," Crouse says. "Because everybody needs to go home and complain about the director. Everybody."

Crouse has appeared in featured and guest roles in a number of television series. Notable roles include a recurring portrayal of Kate McBride, a lesbian police officer on Hill Street Blues during its sixth season in 1986. This was the first lesbian recurring character on a major network. Crouse is also known for her role in the fourth season of Buffy the Vampire Slayer, where she was a recurring supporting cast member playing Professor Maggie Walsh. Crouse has also guest-starred on Alias, CSI: Crime Scene Investigation, Columbo, Criminal Minds, Law & Order, ER, Millennium, and NYPD Blue.

In recent years, Crouse has concentrated on the theater. "Once you get your driver's license, you end your film career," says Crouse. "Look at my generation. Great actresses like Glenn Close and Susan Sarandon—there's nothing written for anyone over a certain age." In 2007, Crouse opened a revival of The Belle of Amherst, a one-woman show about the life of poet Emily Dickinson, at the Gloucester Stage in Gloucester, Massachusetts. "You can't stop and recite something," says Crouse. "You have to keep the poetry very, very active, which is pretty easy with Dickinson. She was striving so hard to understand what life was about. It's very dramatic poetry in that way.

Crouse appeared in Lee Blessing's Going to St. Ives with the Gloucester Stage Company during the summer of 2008 and provided the narration for Virginia Lee Burton: A Sense of Place, a documentary film about Virginia Lee Burton. In 2021, she appeared in a limited engagement of Mornings at Seven at Broadway's Theatre at St. Clements.

== Personal life ==
After a relationship with Robert Duvall, Crouse married playwright David Mamet in 1977. The two had met during the production on Slap Shot. John Lahr writes in his book Show and Tell: New Yorker Profiles that when Mamet married Crouse in 1977, he "married into show business aristocracy". Lahr also writes that Mamet received his first screenwriting assignment through Crouse. Crouse was on her way to audition for Bob Rafelson's 1981 remake of The Postman Always Rings Twice, and jokingly Mamet told Crouse to tell Rafelson that "he was a fool if he didn't hire me to write the screenplay." But Crouse said this to Rafelson, who called Mamet; when the director asked why he should hire him for the screenplay, Mamet replied, "Because I'll give you a good screenplay or a sincere apology." Mamet received the job. She and Mamet divorced in 1990. Their marriage produced two daughters, Willa and Zosia Mamet.

Crouse's brother is Timothy Crouse, author of The Boys on the Bus about political journalism during the 1972 presidential campaign.

=== Buddhist beliefs ===
Crouse is a Buddhist. In 2005, she organized an annual Buddhist educational program, originally held at the Windhover Center for the Performing Arts in Rockport, Massachusetts, and then in 2010 moved to The Governor's Academy in Byfield, Massachusetts. Crouse has spoken on the relevance of Buddhism in the modern world:

[Buddhism] is not an exclusive club. It has something to offer everyone at all levels ... Buddhism is dynamic and has captured the interests of Americans. Even our quantum physics validate[s] ideas the Buddha taught 2,500 years ago.

== Filmography ==
=== Film ===
Year	Title	Role	Notes
1976	All the President's Men	Kay Eddy	
1977	Slap Shot	Lily Braden	
1977	Between the Lines	Abbie	
1981	Prince of the City	Carla Ciello	
1982	The Verdict	Kaitlin Costello	
1983	Krull	Princess Lyssa (voice)	
1983	Daniel	Rochelle Isaacson	
1984	Iceman	Dr. Diane Brady	
1984	Places in the Heart	Margaret Lomax	nomination for Best Supporting Actress Oscar
1987	House of Games	Margaret Ford	
1989	Brave Irene	Narrator (voice)	Short subject
1989	Communion	Anne Strieber	
1990	Desperate Hours	Brenda Chandler	
1994	Being Human	Janet	
1995	Bye Bye Love	Grace Damico	
1995	The Indian in the Cupboard	Jane	
1996	The Juror	Tallow	
1996	The Arrival	Ilana Green	
1997	Prefontaine	Elfriede Prefontaine	
1998	Progeny	Dr. Susan Lamarche	
1999	Stranger in My House	Patti Young	
1999	The Insider	Sharon Tiller	
2000	One Hell of a Guy	Judge Davis	
2001	Almost Salinas	Allie	
2001	Impostor	Chancellor	
2002	Cherish	Therapist	
2007	Mr. Brooks	Captain Lister	
2013	Somewhere Slow	Katherine Franklin	
2023	Chantilly Bridge	Rheza	

=== Television ===
Year	Title	Role	Notes
1976	Eleanor and Franklin	Marjorie Bennett	TV film
1976	The Tenth Level	Karen	TV film
1977	Eleanor and Franklin: The White House Years	Marjorie Bennett	TV film
1980	Paul's Case	First Actress	TV film
1981	Summer Solstice	Young Maggie Burnside	TV film
1982	Kennedy's Children	Rona	TV film
1985	ABC Afterschool Special	Louise Sanders	Episode: "I Want to Go Home"
1986–1987	Hill Street Blues	Kate McBride	Recurring role (5 episodes)
1987	The Equalizer	Sarah McGee	Episode: "Solo"
1988	American Playhouse	Ronnie	Episode: "Lemon Sky"
1989	Columbo	Dr. Joan Allenby	Episode: "Sex and the Married Detective"
1989	CBS Summer Playhouse	Annie Holscher	Episode: "American Nuclear"
1990	Everyday Heroes	Janet Florine	TV film
1990	Lifestories	Rebecca McManus	Episode: "Rebecca McManus and Steve Arnold"
1990	L.A. Law	Sharon Cummings	Episode: "Outward Bound"
1992	Batman: The Animated Series	Mrs. Grant (voice)	Episode: "I've Got Batman in My Basement"
1993	Murder, She Wrote	Louise Anderson-Crowe	Episode: "Killer Radio"
1993	Civil Wars	Dianne Ralston	Episodes: "Captain Kangaroo Court", "A Liver Runs Through It"
1993	Chantilly Lace	Rheza	TV film
1993	Final Appeal	Dana Cartier	TV film
1993	Law & Order	Diane Meade	Episode: "Promises to Keep"
1993	The Halloween Tree	Additional Voices	TV film
1994	Out of Darkness	Kim Donaldson	TV film
1994	Traps	Laura Parkhurst	Recurring role (5 episodes)
1994	L.A. Law	Sharon Cummings	Episode: "Finish Line"
1994	Parallel Lives	Una Pace	TV film
1995	CBS Schoolbreak Special	Anna Leone	Episode: "Between Mother and Daughter"
1996	ER	Dr. Anna Castiglioni	Episode: "Baby Shower"
1996	Norma Jean & Marilyn	Natasha Lytess	TV film
1996	If These Walls Could Talk	Frances White	Segment, "1996"
1996	Millennium	Ardis Cohen	Episode: "Kingdom Come"
1996–1997	NYPD Blue	Jane Wallace	Episodes: "Ted and Carey's Bogus Adventure", "Alice Doesn't Fit Here Anymore"
1998	Brimstone	Dr. Julia Martin	Episode: "Heat"
1999	Beyond the Prairie: The True Story of Laura Ingalls Wilder	Caroline Ingalls	TV film
1999	The Outer Limits	Gwen Sawyer	Episode: "Tribunal"
1999	Touched by an Angel	Kate	Episode: "Such a Time as This"
1999	Law & Order	Judge Denise Grobman	Episode: "DNR"
1999–2000	Buffy the Vampire Slayer	Prof. Maggie Walsh	Recurring role (9 episodes)
2001	The Warden	Maureen Redmond	TV film
2001-2002	Providence	Lauren MacKenzie	Recurring role (4 episodes)
2002	Frasier	Peg	Episodes: "Juvenilia", "The Proposal"
2002	The Division	Donna B. / Julie M.	Episode: "Forgive Me, Father"
2002	Alias	Dr. Carson Evans	Episode: "The Prophecy"
2002	Beyond the Prairie, Part 2: The True Story of Laura Ingalls Wilder	Caroline Ingalls	TV film
2002	Arliss	Sharon 'Sydney' Perelli	Episode: "The Immortal"
2003	Hack	Beth Kulvicki	Episodes: "Forgive, But Don't Forget", "Black Eye", "Sinners and Saints", "All Others Pay Cash"
2003	Dragnet	Captain Ruth Hagermann	Recurring role (6 episodes)
2004	CSI: Crime Scene Investigation	Dr. Mona Lavelle	Episode: "Ch-Ch-Changes"
2005	Law & Order	Judge Deirdre Hellstrom	Episode: "Red Ball"
2005	Criminal Minds	Mary Mays	Episode: "Blood Hungry"
2007	Drive	The Boss	Episode: "Rearview"
2009–2011	Law & Order: Special Victims Unit	Judge Andrews	Recurring role (7 episodes)
2010	FlashForward	Mrs. Kirby	Episodes: "Revelation Zero: Parts 1 & 2"
