= Helen Slater =

American actress and singer-songwriter (born 1963)

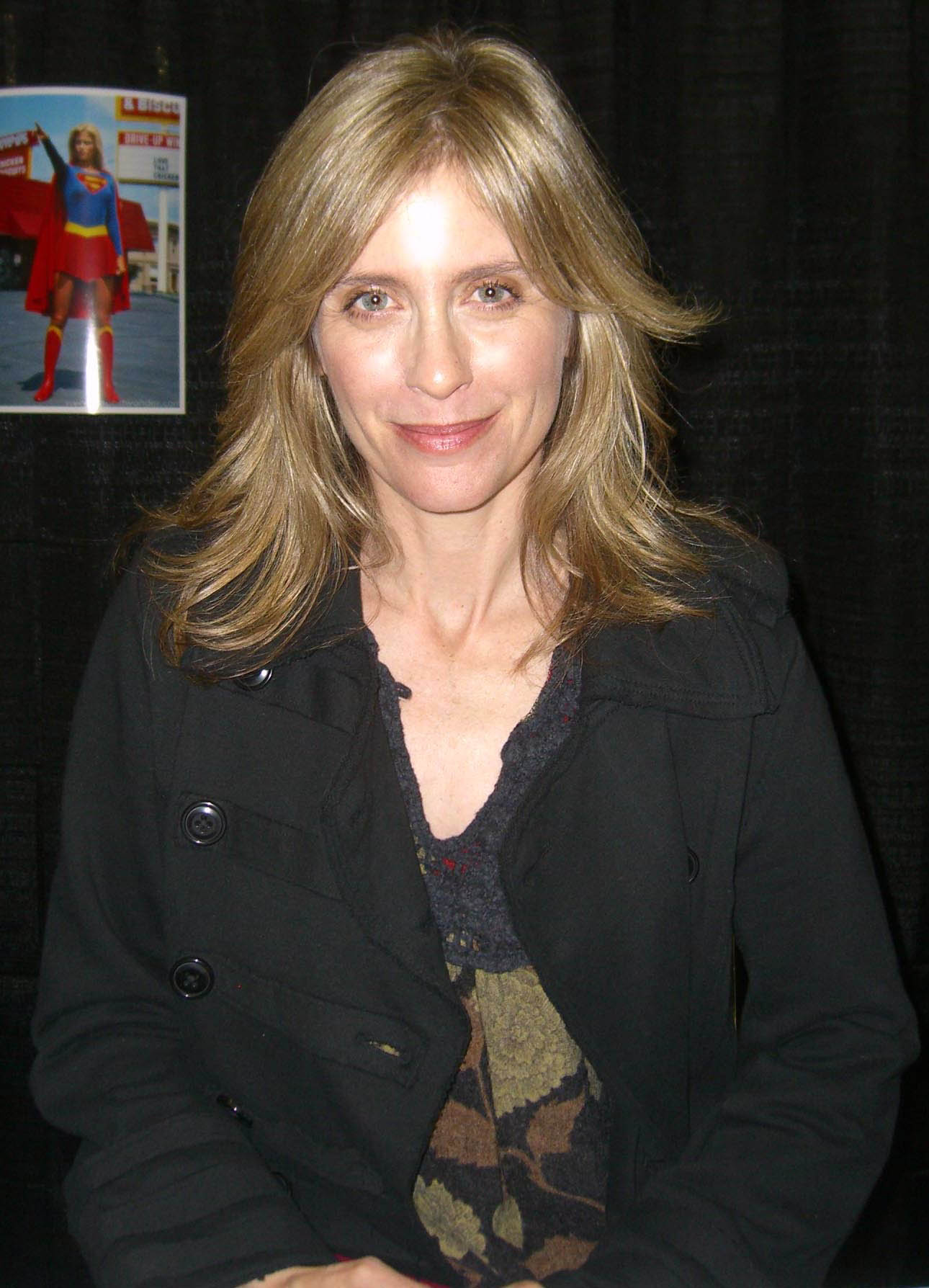
- Helen Slater in 2009
- Born: Helen Rachel Slater; December 15, 1963 (age 62); Bethpage, New York, US
- Occupations: Actress; singer-songwriter
- Years active: 1982–present
- Spouse: Robert Watzke (m. 1989)
- Children: 1
- Website: helenslater.com

Helen Rachel Slater (born December 15, 1963) is an American actress and singer-songwriter. She is best known for playing the DC Comics superheroine Supergirl in the 1984 film Supergirl, as well as appearing in films such as The Legend of Billie Jean (1985), Ruthless People (1986), The Secret of My Success (1987), City Slickers (1991), Chantilly Lace (1993), Lassie (1994), and No Way Back (1995). She provided the voice of Talia al Ghul in Batman: The Animated Series, portrayed Lara-El in Smallville, and played Eliza Danvers in the 2015 Supergirl TV series.

== Early life ==
Slater was born in Bethpage, New York to Alice Joan (née Citrin), a lawyer and nuclear disarmament peace activist based in New York City; and Gerald Slater, a television executive. Her parents divorced in 1974. She is Jewish. She has a brother, David, who is a lawyer in New York City. Slater attended Great Neck South High School and then transferred to the High School of Performing Arts from which she graduated in 1982.

== Career ==
=== Film and television ===
Beating Demi Moore and Brooke Shields, Slater played Supergirl in the 1984 film Supergirl. She has starred in several further films including The Legend of Billie Jean (1985), Ruthless People (1986), The Secret of My Success (1987), and City Slickers (1991). She has additionally found work as an actress in television and stage projects.

Following Supergirl, Slater has made multiple appearances in Superman media such as Superman's mother Lara-El in the TV series Smallville, Supergirl's adoptive mother Eliza Danvers in the Supergirl TV series, and Clark Kent's adoptive mother Martha Kent in DC Super Hero Girls: Hero of the Year and the associated film. Slater did filming for the film The Flash (2023) to portray Supergirl in a de-aged cameo appearance.

In 1985, DC Comics included Slater as one of the honorees in the company's 50th anniversary publication Fifty Who Made DC Great for her work on the Supergirl film.

=== Stage work ===
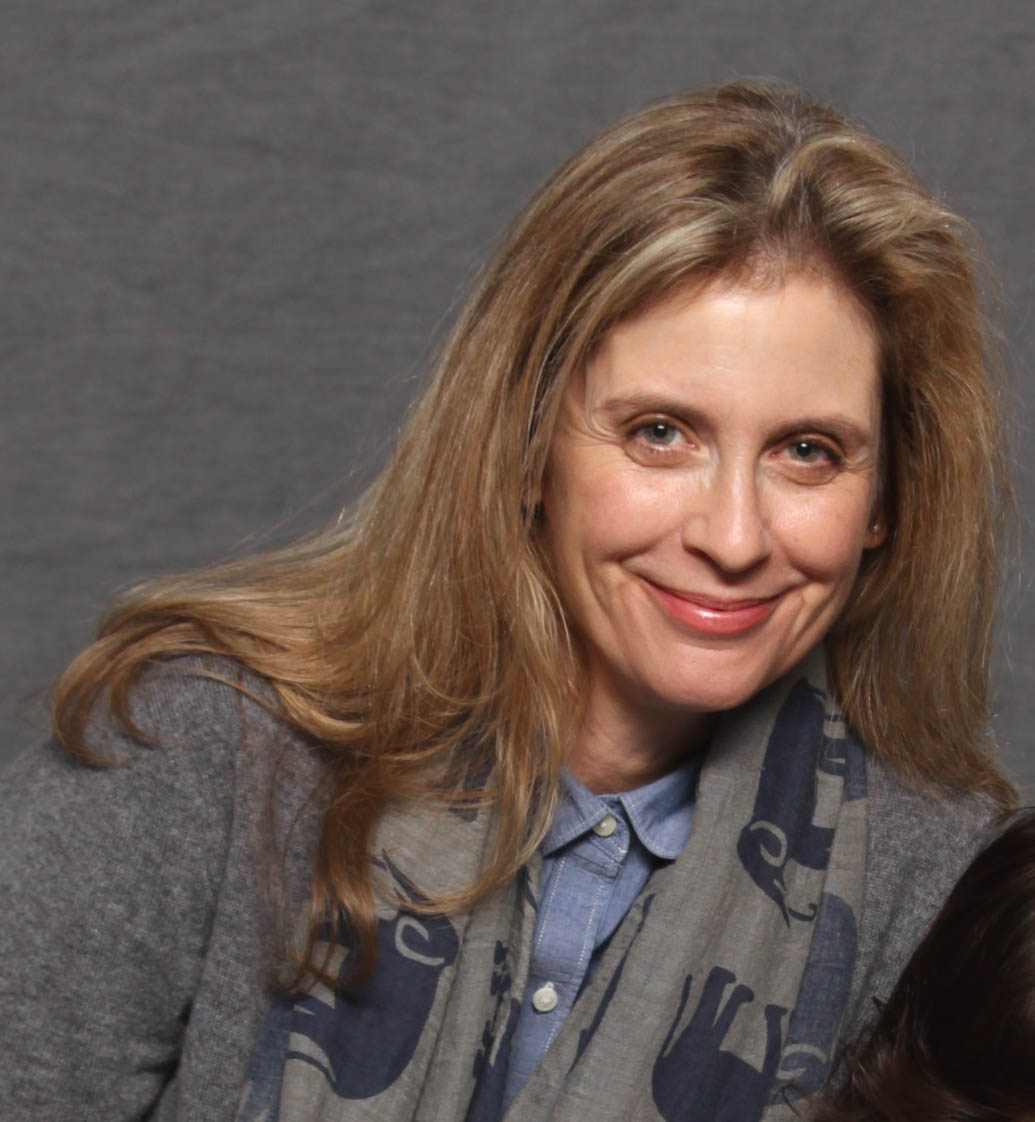
Slater in 2016

In 1987, Slater co-founded the New York theater group, Naked Angels, with Gina Gershon. In 1991, she also co-founded, with her husband, Robert Watzke, the L.A. based theater group The Bubalaires.

Slater appeared in two off-Broadway plays: Almost Romance and Responsible Parties. She also starred in The Big Deal at the Pasadena Playhouse.

=== Music career ===
In 2003, she released the album, One of These Days, consisting of her original songs. The tracks were real-time recordings with Slater singing and playing piano, accompanied by six other musicians; no multitracking, editing, or dubbing was employed. In 2005, she released a second album, Crossword, which used the same recording approach as her first album. Both albums were produced by Phillip Swann. In 2008, Cortes Alexander recorded Slater's "Any Day Now" and "Love'll Come & Do Just That" on his album Swell. Since then, Slater has released four additional albums: Shine (2010), The Myth of Ancient Greece (2013) and The Ugly Duckling (2015), both made for children and Selkie (2019), an eleven-song concept album released as one continuous musical piece.

=== Writing ===
In 2010, Slater wrote a Supergirl story, "A Hero's Journey", which appeared in the fiftieth issue of the fifth volume of the Supergirl comic book.

== Filmography ==
Film
| Year | Title | Role | Notes |
|---|---|---|---|
| 1984 | Supergirl | Kara Zor-El / Linda Lee / Supergirl | |
| 1985 | The Legend of Billie Jean | Billie Jean Davy | |
| 1986 | Ruthless People | Sandy Kessler | |
| 1987 | The Secret of My Success | Christy Wills | |
| 1988 | Sticky Fingers | Hattie | |
| 1989 | Happy Together | Alexandra Page | Also features singing by Slater |
| 1991 | City Slickers | Bonnie Rayburn | |
| 1993 | Betrayal of the Dove | Ellie West | |
| 1993 | A House in the Hills | Alex Weaver | |
| 1994 | Lassie | Laura Turner | Also features singing by Slater |
| 1995 | The Steal | Kim | |
| 1995 | No Way Back | Mary | |
| 1997 | The Long Way Home | Herself | Voice; documentary |
| 1999 | Carlo's Wake | Lisa Torello | |
| 2001 | Nowhere in Sight | Carly Bauers | |
| 2004 | Seeing Other People | Penelope | |
| 2011 | Beautiful Wave | Jane Davenport | Direct-to-video |
| 2012 | Model Minority | Mrs. Ambrose | |
| 2014 | Echo Park | Julia | |
| 2015 | The Curse of Downers Grove | Diane | |
| 2016 | DC Super Hero Girls: Hero of the Year | Martha Kent | Voice |
| 2016 | A Remarkable Life | Iris | |
| 2021 | Confetti | Dr. Wurner | |
| 2023 | Chantilly Bridge | Hannah | |
| 2023 | The Flash | Kara Zor-El / Linda Lee / Supergirl | Digitally de-aged cameo |

Television
| Year | Title | Role | Notes |
|---|---|---|---|
| 1982 | ABC Afterschool Special | Amy Watson | Episode: "Amy & the Angel" |
| 1988 | Improv Tonite | Herself | Guest host |
| 1990 | Half a World Away | Jacqui Cochrane | Miniseries |
| 1990 | Capital News | Anne McKenna | Television film |
| 1991 | The Hidden Room | Lauren | Episode: "Wasting Away" |
| 1992 | Seinfeld | Becky Gelke | Uncredited; episode: "The Good Samaritan" |
| 1992 | Dream On | Sarah | Episode: "Theory of Relativity" |
| 1992–1994 | Batman: The Animated Series | Talia al Ghul | Voice; 4 episodes |
| 1993 | 12:01 | Lisa Fredericks | Television film |
| 1993 | Chantilly Lace | Hannah | Television film |
| 1994 | Couples | Nina | Television film |
| 1994 | Parallel Lives | Elsa Freedman | Television film |
| 1997 | Caroline in the City | Cassandra Thompson | Uncredited; episode: "Caroline and the Monkeys" |
| 1997 | Toothless | Mrs. Lewis | Television film |
| 1997–1998 | Michael Hayes | Julie Siegel | 3 episodes |
| 1998 | Best Friends for Life | Pammy Cahill | Television film |
| 2000 | American Adventure | Kathy | Pilot |
| 2001 | Will & Grace | Peggy Truman | Episode: "Moveable Feast" |
| 2003 | Boston Public | Mrs. McNeal | Episode: "Chapter Seventy-Four" |
| 2004 | Law & Order: Special Victims Unit | Susan Coyle | Episode: "Families" |
| 2005 | Grey's Anatomy | Nadia Shelton | Episode: "Grandma Got Run Over by a Reindeer" |
| 2006 | Jane Doe: The Harder They Fall | Stella Andre | Television film |
| 2006 | The New Adventures of Old Christine | Liz | Episode: "Teach Your Children Well" |
| 2007 | Crossing Jordan | Elaine Tallridge | Episode: "Seven Feet Under" |
| 2007–2010 | Smallville | Lara-El | 3 episodes |
| 2009 | Supernatural | Susan Carter | Episode: "Family Remains" |
| 2009 | Eleventh Hour | Susan Wynne | Episode: "Medea" |
| 2009 | Greek | Dr. Magda Stephanopoulos | Episode: "Guilty Treasures" |
| 2010–2011 | Gigantic | Jennifer Brooks | 10 episodes |
| 2010 | CSI: NY | Elizabeth Harris | Episode: "Do Not Pass Go" |
| 2011 | Private Practice | Erin | Episode: "Two Steps Back" |
| 2011 | Rock the House | Diane Petersen | Television film |
| 2011 | Drop Dead Diva | Penny Brecker | Episode: "Hit and Run" |
| 2011–2013 | The Lying Game | Kristin Mercer | Main cast |
| 2013 | The Good Mother | Cheryl Jordan | Television film |
| 2014 | Caper | Luke's Mom | Web series; episode: "All Hands on Peltas" |
| 2014 | The Young and the Restless | Dr. Chiverton | 4 episodes |
| 2015 | Mad Men | Sheila | Episode: "Person to Person" |
| 2015–2021 | Supergirl | Eliza Danvers | 13 episodes |
| 2015 | Agent X | Helen Eckhart | Episode: "Fidelity" |
| 2016 | DC Super Hero Girls: Super Hero High | Martha Kent | Voice; television film |
| 2026 | The Rookie | Darla Barrett | Episode: "Survive the Streets" |

== Discography ==
- One of These Days (2003)
- Crossword (2005)
- Shine (2010)
- The Myth of Ancient Greece (2013)
- The Ugly Duckling (2015)
- Selkie (2019)
