= The Winter Line =

- Westworld episode
- Episode no.: Season 3 Episode 2
- Directed by: Richard J. Lewis
- Written by: Matthew Pitts; Lisa Joy
- Cinematography by: John Grillo
- Editing by: Andrew Seklir
- Production code: 302
- Original air date: March 22, 2020
- Running time: 60 minutes

Guest appearances
- Rodrigo Santoro as Hector Escaton / Ettore; John Gallagher Jr. as Liam Dempsey Jr.; Leonardo Nam as Felix Lutz; Ptolemy Slocum as Sylvester; D. B. Weiss as Dan; David Benioff as Dave; David Danipour as Benny

Episode chronology
| ← Previous "Parce Domine" | Next → "The Absence of Field" |

"The Winter Line" is the second episode in the third season of the HBO science fiction dystopian thriller television series Westworld. The episode aired on March 22, 2020. It was written by Matthew Pitts and series co-creator Lisa Joy, and directed by Richard J. Lewis. The episode served as Thandie Newton's pick to support her 2020 Emmy Award nomination for Outstanding Supporting Actress in a Drama Series.

== Plot summary ==
In Warworld, Maeve is rescued by Hector and eludes Nazi guards. She soon realizes that Hector is just playing out a narrative like in Westworld and that he no longer remembers who she is. She kills herself, which sends her back to Operations. When she escapes and tries to lobotomize herself, Lee Sizemore stops her, revealing he survived being shot in Westworld. (Note: As shown in "The Passenger") He explains he made sure to have Maeve brought to Warworld as it was the closest park to Westworld and the Forge, so she can reunite with her daughter in the Sublime.

Bernard arrives at Westworld and travels to the old lab where he had learned he was a host. He finds Ashley Stubbs there, who reveals he was programmed to help cover Bernard's escape and then kill himself to protect Bernard's secret, but when he attempted to shoot himself, he missed his explosive killswitch. After Bernard fixes him up, Stubbs takes him to the Mesa to find Maeve, as Bernard believes she is necessary to fight Dolores. However, they find Maeve's host in cold storage and missing its "pearl."

When Maeve wakes again in Warworld, she quickly abandons Hector to meet Lee and travel to the Forge. Once there, Lee is surprised when Maeve admits she has never been inside the Forge before and it was not her who activated the Door, coming to the conclusion it must have been Dolores. Lee's behaviour and questioning leads Maeve (as well as Lee) to realise he is not the real Lee Sizemore, who did indeed die in the park. She further discovers that her entire experiences so far have been part of a virtual reality simulation to gain information on accessing the data in the Forge. She returns to Operations with Lee and deduces that the system she is in has limited processing power. When she wakes up again in Warworld, her tricks overload the system, freezing everything and allowing her to find her location in the real world, among a bank of other hosts connected to a system. She programs a maintenance robot to steal her pearl, but guards are able to shoot down the robot upon its escape.

Stubbs takes Bernard to a medieval fantasy-themed park and its functioning Operations center so he can try to find Maeve. He finds Maeve is no longer in the park and must be outside. While Stubbs protects him from Delos guards, he uses the park systems to check his own code to ensure Dolores did not contaminate it when she made him a new body. They flee, with Bernard having become aware of Dolores researching past park guests including Liam Dempsey Jr.. Bernard programs Stubbs to continue as his bodyguard as they return to the mainland.

Maeve awakes in the real world home of Engerraund Serac, who reveals the system he built is helping to write humanity's future, until it recently stopped working correctly. He had thought that Maeve had caused the divergence, only to discover that the disruption was instead caused by Dolores. He seeks Maeve's help to kill Dolores. Maeve wants no part in his plan and tries to stab Serac, but he reveals a killswitch that enables him to freeze her in her tracks.

== Production ==
During one scene with Bernard and Ashley, they walk through the Operations Center for Medieval Park, which includes cameos from David Benioff and D. B. Weiss, executive producers of Game of Thrones, as park technicians considering how to take a dragon host and sell it to a park in Costa Rica with the park's closing. There had long been discussion between showrunners Jonathan Nolan and Lisa Joy with Game of Thrones' Benioff and Weiss as well as the series' original author George R. R. Martin, a fan of Westworld.

The episode begins as 16:9 widescreen aspect ratio, but as Maeve realized being in simulation, the aspect ratio dolly from 16:9 to 2.35:1 as in the second season to differentiate reality from simulation.

As Futureworld, the sequel of the original Westworld film, featured a Medieval World setting, fitting this into the show was "just irresistible", according to Nolan. Further, they were able to use the CGI model of Drogon as the dragon from Pixomondo that did the model for Game of Thrones. The idea of selling the dragon to the park in Costa Rica also references another Michael Crichton work, Jurassic Park.

== Reception ==
On Rotten Tomatoes, the episode has an 89% approval rating with an average score of 7.06/10, from 19 reviews. The site's critical consensus reads: "In 'The Winter Line', Westworld's muddled timelines start to surface, but by continuing to put character development center stage the episode avoids confusion and takes Maeve and Bernard on an exciting new journey."

The original live broadcast received 778,000 viewers, which was down in viewership from the season premiere which had 901,000 viewers.

== See also ==
- Italian Fascism
- World War II in popular culture
