= Gerald Slater =

American television executive (1934–2020)

- Born: 1934
- Died: April 24, 2020 (aged 85–86)
- Citizenship: American
- Employer: The Public Broadcasting Service (PBS)

Gerald Slater (1934 – April 24, 2020) was an American public television executive, Emmy-nominated producer, and one of the four founding employees of PBS.

== Overview ==
Slater was born in The Bronx. As an executive at PBS and WETA in the 1970s and 1980s, he played a key role in the development of public television, expanding its coverage of public affairs and the arts. He was also instrumental in airing the 1974 Senate Watergate hearings in primetime on PBS. His daughter is actress Helen Slater.

Slater's personal and professional papers reside at the University of Maryland Archives.

Slater died from COVID-19 at Sibley Memorial Hospital in Washington, D.C., on April 24, 2020, at age 86, during the COVID-19 pandemic in Washington, D.C. His condition was exacerbated by multiple myeloma, a bone marrow cancer.
