= Kiralee Hayashi =

American stunt woman, actress, researcher

- Born: Hawaii, U.S.
- Occupations: Actress; stuntwoman; gymnast
- Years active: 2007–present
- Website: kiraleehayashi.com

Kiralee M. Hayashi is an American stunt woman, actress, and gymnast.

She is known for her work on The Twilight Saga: Breaking Dawn – Part 2, Transformers: Age of Extinction, and The Book of Eli.

== Background ==
Hayashi is of Japanese, Portuguese, English & Irish descent. Her success as a gymnast gained her a full scholarship to UCLA, where she studied neuroscience.

== Academia ==
While at UCLA she did research in the Paul Thompson's group at Laboratory of Neuro Image (LONI). She co-authored several papers on neuroscience topics.

She has a low Erdős number of just three through the publication Brain surface parameterization using Riemann surface structure which was coauthored by Shing-Tung Yau. Yau published On sampling Markov chains together with Ronald Graham, and Graham authored On Sum of Fibonacci Numbers together with Paul Erdős.

== Gymnastics ==
While at UCLA she was also a notable gymnast. One of the most highly recruited freshmen her graduating year. She garnered 9 All-American titles (both first and second team) and was a National Balance Beam champion in 1999. She was Pac-10 gymnast of the year in 1999 and Pac-10 Conference Medalist (Note: A Conference Medal is awarded annually to each member institution's outstanding male and female student-athlete based on the exhibition of the greatest combination of performance and achievement in scholarship, athletics and leadership.) for 1998-99, her senior year. And was a two-time Pac-10 All-Academic selection. Hayashi was a finalist for the AAI American Award, given annually to the nation's most outstanding all-around senior gymnast.

== Filmography ==
=== Films ===
Year	Title	Role	Notes
2003	Wasabi Tuna	"Sexy Asian Girl #2"	
2007	Balls of Fury	"Hot Asian Servant Girl"	Uncredited
2007	Haunted Forest	Satinka	
2010	The Book of Eli	Stuntwoman	
2011	The Green Hornet	Stuntwoman	Uncredited
2011	The Twilight Saga: Breaking Dawn – Part 1	Stuntwoman	
2012	The Twilight Saga: Breaking Dawn – Part 2	Stuntwoman	
2014	Transformers: Age of Extinction	Stuntwoman	
2016	Independence Day: Resurgence	Stuntwoman	
2016	Dirty 30	Stuntwoman	
2017	Sleepless	Stuntwoman	
2017	Clinical	Stuntwoman	
2018	The Cloverfield Paradox	Stuntwoman	
2024	Twisters	Stuntwoman	

=== Television ===
Year	Title	Role	Notes
	NCIS		
	Grey's Anatomy	Tracey Mitchell	
	Supah Ninjas		
