= Mayflower: The Pilgrims' Adventure =

- VHS cover from 1999
- Genre: Adventure; History
- Screenplay by: James Lee Barrett
- Directed by: George Schaefer
- Starring: Anthony Hopkins; Richard Crenna; Jenny Agutter
- Theme music composer: Brad Fiedel
- Country of origin: United States
- Original language: English

Production
- Executive producer: Linda Yellen
- Producer: Linda Yellen
- Cinematography: Arthur J. Ornitz
- Editor: Eric Albertson
- Running time: 100 min.
- Production company: Szygzy Productions

Original release
- Network: CBS
- Release: November 21, 1979

Mayflower: The Pilgrims' Adventure is a 1979 American made-for-television historical adventure film dramatizing the Pilgrims' voyage from Plymouth, England to Cape Cod in New England aboard the Mayflower in 1620. The film was directed by George Schaefer and stars Anthony Hopkins, Richard Crenna, and Jenny Agutter.

The story focuses on romantic interactions between the passengers and crew, with People describing it as "plotted like a pre-shuffleboard Love Boat".

The film was first broadcast by CBS on November 21, 1979.

== Cast ==
- Anthony Hopkins as Captain Christopher Jones
- Richard Crenna as the Pilgrim leader William Brewster
- Jenny Agutter as Priscilla Mullens
- Michael Beck as John Alden
- David Dukes as Myles Standish
- Trish Van Devere as Rose Standish
