= House of Games (film) =

1987 David Mamet film

- Theatrical release poster
- Directed by: David Mamet
- Screenplay by: David Mamet
- Story by: Jonathan Katz; David Mamet
- Produced by: Michael Hausman
- Starring: Lindsay Crouse; Joe Mantegna
- Cinematography: Juan Ruiz Anchía
- Edited by: Trudy Ship
- Music by: Alaric Jans
- Production company: Filmhaus
- Distributed by: Orion Pictures
- Release dates: October 11, 1987 (New York Film Festival); October 16, 1987 (limited)
- Running time: 102 minutes
- Country: United States
- Language: English
- Box office: $2.6 million

House of Games is a 1987 American neo-noir film about con-men and confidence scams by David Mamet, his directorial debut. He also wrote the screenplay, based on a story he co-wrote with Jonathan Katz. The film's cast includes Lindsay Crouse, Joe Mantegna, Ricky Jay, and J. T. Walsh.

== Plot ==
Psychiatrist Margaret Ford has achieved success with her recently published book about obsessive-compulsive disorder, but feels unfulfilled. Her patient, Billy Hahn, says his life is in danger because he owes money to a criminal figure named Mike Mancuso. He threatens suicide, brandishing a gun. Margaret persuades him to surrender the weapon to her and promises to help him.

That night, Margaret visits a pool hall called House of Games where she confronts Mike. He is willing to forgive Billy's debt if Margaret accompanies him to a back-room poker game and watch for the tell of George, another player: he plays with his ring when he bluffs. She agrees, and notices George playing with his ring after making a big bet. She discloses this to Mike, who calls the bet. However, George wins and demands that Mike pay the $6,000 bet, which he is unable to do. George pulls a gun, but Margaret intervenes and offers to pay the debt with a personal check. She then notices the gun is a water pistol, and realizes the entire game is a confidence trick for her money. She declines to pay, but spends the rest of the night socializing with the con men. The experience excites her and she returns the next night. She asks Mike to teach her about con games so she can write a book about it. Mike appears skeptical, but agrees.

Margaret is enchanted by Mike showing her simple con tricks. Eventually, the two sneak into a hotel room and have sex. Afterward, Mike tells Margaret that con artists take a small token from every "mark" to signify their dominance. While Mike is in the bathroom, she takes a small pocket knife belonging to the room's occupant. Mike says he is late for another large-scale con that he and his associates are planning at the same hotel. Mike reluctantly allows her to tag along, posing as his wife. The con involves Mike, his partner Joey, and the "mark", a businessman, discovering a briefcase full of money and taking it to a hotel room. They discuss whether to turn it in or split it among themselves. When the "mark" withdraws to the bathroom, Margaret discovers that he is an undercover cop part of a sting operation. She warns Mike, and they attempt to escape, but the cop tries to arrest them. After a struggle, Margaret accidentally causes the cop to fatally shoot himself. She, Mike, and Joey escape to the garage, where they force Margaret to steal a car and drive past two uniformed police officers with the con men concealed in the back seat. They drive the car to a riverbank and are preparing to abandon it when they discover that the briefcase, containing $80,000 borrowed from the Mafia for the con, is gone. Margaret offers to give Mike $80,000 of her own money so he can repay the mob.

Mike tells Margaret they must split up to avoid any police attention, and claims to be going into hiding. Riddled with guilt, Margaret returns to her office and refuses to see any patients. Billy arrives in high spirits, and after a brief conversation, she spots him driving away in the same red convertible that she "stole" at the hotel. She tracks him to a bar and sees Mike, all his associates, the man posing as the hotel guest, and the fake undercover policeman, discussing the night's events - a scheme to con Margaret out of $80,000. She also learns that the pocket knife she stole from the hotel room belongs to Mike, who set up the room to appear occupied. He mocks Margaret for stealing it.

After overhearing Mike is going to the airport that night, she intercepts him there and says she is so worried about the police that she has withdrawn her entire life's savings. In a non-public area, she pleads with him to start a new life with her. Mike is lured by the money, then realizes he is being tricked when she inadvertently reveals she overheard the con men discussing the pocketknife. He says her money is gone, but she pulls out Billy's gun and demands that he beg for his life. Disbelieving her, Mike refuses, but Margaret shoots him in the leg. When Mike curses her, she shoots him five more times, killing him. She calmly conceals the gun and leaves.

Some time later, Margaret has returned from a vacation, she has written another successful book, and is meeting her friend and colleague Dr. Littauer. They talk over lunch, and Margaret says, "When you've done something unforgivable, you must forgive yourself, and that's what I've done, and it's done". While her friend is away from the table, Margaret distracts another diner and steals a gold lighter from her purse, relishing the thrill.

== Cast ==
- Lindsay Crouse as Dr. Margaret Ford
- Joe Mantegna as Mike Mancuso
- Mike Nussbaum as Joey
- Lilia Skala as Dr. Maria Littauer
- J. T. Walsh as the Businessman
- Steven Goldstein as Billy Hahn
- Ricky Jay as George
- W. H. Macy as Sgt. Moran
- Meshach Taylor as Mr. Dean

== Release ==
=== Critical reception ===
Describing the structure of the film as "diabolical and impeccable", Roger Ebert gave the film his highest rating of four out of four stars, saying, "This movie is awake. I have seen so many films that were sleepwalking through the debris of old plots and second-hand ideas that it was a constant pleasure to watch House of Games." Ebert declared it the best film of 1987 and later included it in The Great Movies.

Calling the film "a wonderfully devious comedy", Vincent Canby also praised the film in his review for The New York Times, writing that "Mr. Mamet, poker player and Pulitzer Prize-winning playwright, makes a fine, completely self-assured debut directing his original screenplay. Sometimes he's bluffing outrageously, but that's all right too."

Striking a contrary note, The Washington Post saw Mamet as "rechewing film noir, Hitchcock twists and MacGuffins, as well as the Freudian mumbo-jumbo already masticated tasteless by so many cine-kids."

On the review aggregator website Rotten Tomatoes, 94% of 31 critics' reviews are positive. The website's consensus reads: "Galvanized by David Mamet's punchy dialogue and a winding succession of surprises, House of Games is a terse thriller where confidence is currency." Metacritic, which uses a weighted average, assigned the film a score of 78 out of 100, based on 13 critics, indicating "generally favorable" reviews. Audiences polled by CinemaScore gave the film an average grade of "B+" on an A+ to F scale.

=== Home media ===
In August 2007, the Criterion Collection released a special edition of Mamet's film on DVD. Among the supplemental material included are an audio commentary with Mamet and Ricky Jay, new interviews with actors Lindsay Crouse and Joe Mantegna, and a short documentary shot on location during the film's production.

== Stage adaptation ==
Playwright Richard Bean adapted Mamet's script for a production at the Almeida Theatre, London, in September 2010. To meet the confines of the medium the stage version is set in just two locations, and the final resolution between Mike and Margaret is softened. Critical reaction to Bean's version was mixed: Michael Billington found only a "pointless exercise", but Charles Spencer thought that the stage version delivered "far better value than the original picture".

== Remake ==
In 2025, a reimagining of the film was announced to be in development at Amazon MGM Studios. Viola Davis and Yahya Abdul-Mateen II are set to star and produce.
