= Joseph Cross (actor) =

American actor (born 1986)

- Born: Joseph Michael Cross; May 28, 1986 (age 40); New Brunswick, New Jersey, U.S.
- Education: Columbia University
- Occupations: Actor; producer
- Years active: 1997–present

Joseph Michael Cross (born May 28, 1986) is an American actor and producer. He began work as a child actor, starring in the 1998 films Desperate Measures, Wide Awake, and Jack Frost. He won the Satellite Award for Best Actor – Motion Picture for Running with Scissors (2006), and co-starred in Flags of Our Fathers (2006), Untraceable (2008), Milk (2008), and Lincoln (2012).

From 1999 to 2004, Cross starred as Casey Hughes in the CBS soap opera As the World Turns. In 2017, he appeared in the HBO limited series Big Little Lies and the Netflix crime drama series Mindhunter.

== Early life ==
Cross was born in New Brunswick, New Jersey, the son of Maureen (née Toumey), a real estate agent, and Michael J. Cross, who worked in marketing. He has four siblings. Cross grew up in Pelham, New York, and attended Pelham Middle School and Pelham Memorial High School. For his undergraduate studies, Cross transferred from Hartford's Trinity College to Columbia University.

== Career ==
As a child actor, Cross appeared in the Disney Channel Original television film Northern Lights (1997), and starred in the action-thriller Desperate Measures, comedy-drama Wide Awake, and Christmas fantasy film Jack Frost, all of which were released in 1998. He subsequently appeared in several television roles, notably portraying Casey Hughes in the CBS daytime soap opera As the World Turns (1999–2004).

In 2006, Cross played the young Augusten Burroughs in Running with Scissors, a drama also featuring Annette Bening and Evan Rachel Wood, and appeared as real-life Marine Franklin Sousley in the big-budget Flags of Our Fathers, a Clint Eastwood-directed war film. Cross has said that he enjoyed the transition from appearing in Running with Scissors, which he has described as "very character driven and smaller" to the high-profile "epic" Flags of Our Fathers. Running with Scissors has been described by media sources as his "breakout performance", and he was nominated for the Critics' Choice Movie Award for Best Young Performer and won the Satellite Award for Best Actor – Motion Picture Musical or Comedy.

In 2008, Cross starred in the thriller film Untraceable (2008) with Diane Lane, and portrayed gay rights activist Dick Pabich in the Academy Award-nominated Harvey Milk biopic Milk (2008). He won the Critics' Choice Movie Award for Best Acting Ensemble with his Milk co-stars. The following year, he played William "Fred" Parsons in the West End production of Breakfast at Tiffany's, at the Theatre Royal Haymarket, opposite Anna Friel. In 2012, Cross had a leading role as Declan Truss in Doug Karr's comedy film Art Machine. He portrayed the lead role of Davis Green in the drama film The Automatic Hate (2015), alongside Deborah Ann Woll. He portrayed the lead role of Lernert in the science-fiction film Everything Beautiful Is Far Away (2017), alongside Julia Garner. Cross made his directorial debut with the coming-of-age film Summer Night (2019), executive produced by James Ponsoldt.

== Filmography ==
=== Film ===
Year	Title	Role	Notes
1998	Desperate Measures	Matthew Conner	
1998	Wide Awake	Joshua Beal	Nominated – Young Artist Award for Best Performance in a Feature Film – Leading Young Actor
1998	Jack Frost	Charlie Frost	
2005	Homecoming	Young Barry Griffith	
2005	Strangers with Candy	Derrick Blank	
2006	Flags of Our Fathers	Franklin Sousley	
2006	Running with Scissors	Augusten Burroughs	Won – Satellite Award for Best Actor – Motion Picture Musical or Comedy; Nominated – Critics' Choice Movie Award for Best Young Performer
2008	Untraceable	Owen Reilly	
2008	Milk	Dick Pabich	Nominated – Critics' Choice Movie Award for Best Acting Ensemble
2009	Falling Up	Henry O'Shea	
2011	Son of Morning	Philip Katz	
2011	Citizen Gangster	Val Kozak	
2011	Born to Race	Danny Krueger	
2012	Art Machine	Declan Truss	
2012	Mine Games	Michael	
2012	Lincoln	John Hay	
2013	Jimmy P.	Robert R. Holt	
2014	Last Weekend	Roger Green	
2015	The Automatic Hate	Davis Green	
2016	The Last Film Festival	Junior Agent	
2017	Tilt	Joseph Burns	
2017	Everything Beautiful Is Far Away	Lernert	
2020	Mank	Charles Lederer	
2021	Licorice Pizza	Matthew	
2022	Devotion	Charlie Ward	
2025	Affection	Bruce	

=== Television ===
Year	Title	Role	Notes
1997	Northern Lights	Jack Blumstein	TV film Nominated – Young Artist Award for Best Performance in a TV Movie/Pilot/Mini-Series – Leading Young Actor
1997	Dellaventura	Daniel Webb	Episode: "The Biggest Miracle"
1998	Saint Maybe	Young Thomas Bedloe	TV film
1998	Touched by an Angel	Petey Carmichael	Episode: "Psalm 151"
1999–2004	As the World Turns	Casey Hughes	Series regular Nominated – Young Artist Award for Best Performance in a Soap Opera – Young Actor (1999); Nominated – YoungStar Award for Best Young Actor in a Daytime TV Program (1999)
2000	The Spring	Nick Conway	TV film
2003	Third Watch	Eric Beckman	2 episodes
2003	The O'Keefes	Danny O'Keefe	8 episodes
2004	Smallville	Jordan Cross	Episode: "Hereafter"
2004	Law & Order: Special Victims Unit	Adam Nesbit	Episode: "Home"
2005	Law & Order	Will Shea	Episode: "Obsession"
2015	Elementary	Petros Franken	Episode: "One Watson, One Holmes"
2017	Big Little Lies	Tom	6 episodes
2017	Mindhunter	Benjamin Barnwright	2 episodes
2018	Medal of Honor	Sylvester Antolak	8 episodes
2023	Law & Order: Special Victims Unit	Martin Parish	Episode: "Bubble Wrap"
2025	Sub/liminal	Jack	
2026	Criminal Minds Evolution	Marvin Bancroft	Episode: "Requiem for a Dream"
