= The Mother of Exiles =

- Westworld episode
- Episode no.: Season 3 Episode 4
- Directed by: Paul Cameron
- Written by: Jordan Goldberg; Lisa Joy
- Cinematography by: John Grillo
- Editing by: Anna Hauger
- Production code: 304
- Original air date: April 5, 2020
- Running time: 60 minutes

Guest appearances
- John Gallagher Jr. as Liam Dempsey Jr.; Tommy Flanagan as Martin Conells; Katja Herbers as Emily Grace; Hiroyuki Sanada as Musashi / Sato; Rafi Gavron as Roderick; Phoebe Tonkin as Penny; Elizabeth Anweis as The Mortician; Adam Wang as Jiang; Paul-Mikél Williams as Charlie (archive footage)

Episode chronology
← Previous "The Absence of Field"	Next → "Genre"

"The Mother of Exiles" is the fourth episode in the third season of the HBO science fiction dystopian thriller television series Westworld. The episode aired on April 5, 2020. It was written by Jordan Goldberg and Lisa Joy, and directed by Paul Cameron.

== Plot summary ==
William is tormented by nightmares of killing his daughter Emily in Westworld. Charlotte wakes William and tells him she needs him at a Delos board meeting to protect the company from Serac. William cleans himself up and wards off another vision of Emily by telling her it was a conscious decision to kill her. As he leaves, Charlotte comments on his visions of Emily, shocking him.

Believing Dolores has swapped Liam with a host, Bernard and Ashley prepare to infiltrate a private charity event in Los Angeles to abduct Liam. Dolores and Caleb make similar plans after transferring all of Liam's funds out of his account. At the masquerade party event, Bernard and Ashley grab Liam after he discovers his funds are gone, but quickly learn Liam is not a host. Bernard runs off with Liam as Caleb chases them, while Dolores fights Ashley. Bernard is approached by Martin and Liam's bodyguards, and Bernard realizes Martin is the host when Martin kills the guards. Martin instructs Liam to flee and for Caleb to follow him.

Serac again urges Maeve to help find Dolores, as not only does she hold the encryption key to the Delos data, but also to the Sublime to reunite Maeve with her daughter. He claims that Delos' secret project of mapping the human mind can prevent humanity from destroying itself. He reveals his native Paris was destroyed in a nuclear blast. He knows Dolores brought five host control modules, "pearls", and coerces an identity broker to reveal a lead to a Singapore organ trade doctor with ties to the Yakuza. The doctor directs Maeve to the Yakuza headquarters. After dispatching the guards, Maeve meets the Yakuza leader, Sato, recognizing him as the Musashi host from Shōgunworld.

William, Bernard, and Maeve all recognize that Charlotte, Martin, and Sato are all hosts with copies of Dolores' pearl. Dolores, via Sato, tells Maeve that she needs to duplicate herself to prevent Serac from stopping her. She then critically wounds Maeve. William lashes out at Charlotte and she has him committed to a mental institution, where he has a vision of Dolores as he remembered her from the park. She declares he has reached the end of his game. Martin takes Bernard to meet up with Caleb, who has cornered Liam. They are soon joined by Dolores, whom Liam recognizes as Lara, the girlfriend he thought was dead.

== Production ==
This episode reveals that there are at least three additional copies of the Dolores host in addition to the one played by Evan Rachel Wood, with these residing in the hosts of Charlotte Hale (played by Tessa Thompson), Martin Conells (Tommy Flanagan) and Sato (Hiroyuki Sanada). Showrunner Jonathan Nolan said that they had purposely avoided the idea of digital clones in the first two seasons of Westworld, as they felt it would be too early to introduce how such copies would reflect on the nature of hosts while they were still exploring the nature of sentience. With the third season, they were ready to explore this more, and consider concepts such as the nature of how identity would develop and change based on the situation and environment around the host. Wood said that this was partially clued to the audience by the use of blue in the costuming for Charlotte, Martin, and Sato.

Thompson said that unlike with the end of the second season, where she also portrayed a host based on Charlotte but with Dolores' pearl within it, she had been told of the similar situation for her character early on. In the second season, Thompson had only been told the evening before her first scenes in the Charlotte-as-Dolores part, so did not have as much time to prepare. With the third season, she had the season's 'writing bible' early on and was able to study Wood's mannerisms to adopt better into her own acting to help with her performance. Similarly, Flanagan and Sanada only found out shortly before they were to perform their roles on their character's true identity but worked to incorporate Wood's manners she had brought into Dolores into their characters.

The episode title is referenced to "The New Colossus", a sonnet by the American poet Emma Lazarus, which is about the poem to raise money for the construction of a pedestal for the Statue of Liberty (Liberty Enlightening the World) in New York City's Liberty Island, and it was the first entry read at the exhibit's opening on November 2, 1883. The poem was cast onto a bronze plaque and mounted inside the pedestal's lower level in 1903.

This episode is also the only one in this season doesn't have an official behind the scenes video after episode.

=== Music ===
An instrumental orchestral cover of The Weeknd's song "Wicked Games" was arranged and composed by series composer Ramin Djawadi used for the masquerade party event sequence in this episode. It was released as single by WaterTower Music on the same day as the episode's broadcast.

== Reception ==
"The Mother of Exiles" received a positive critique from reviewers. On Rotten Tomatoes, it received an approval rating of 85% and an average score of 8/10, based on 20 ratings. The website's critical consensus reads: "Amid action-packed chases and ultraviolent showdowns, 'The Mother of Exiles' reintroduces a beloved key character and provides some well-deserved, shockingly twisty answers."

The original live broadcast received 779,000 viewers, which was slightly down in viewership from the previous episode which had 801,000 viewers.
