= Arthur J. Ornitz =

American cinematographer (1916-1985)

- Born: Arthur Jacob Ornitz; November 28, 1916; New York City, New York, U.S.
- Died: July 10, 1985 (aged 68); New York City, New York, U.S.
- Other name: Arthur Ornitz
- Education: University of California, Los Angeles
- Occupations: Cinematographer; film director; screenwriter
- Years active: 1936–1983
- Children: 1
- Parent: Samuel Ornitz (father)
- Relatives: Don Ornitz (brother)

Arthur Jacob Ornitz, ASC (November 28, 1916 – July 10, 1985) was an American cinematographer and filmmaker, known best for his work on New York-based productions. He worked with such directors as William Friedkin, Sidney Lumet, John Cassavetes, Paul Mazursky, and Shirley Clarke.

== Early life and education ==
Ornitz was born in New York City, the son of Sadie (née Lesser) and screenwriter Samuel Ornitz, a Hollywood Ten blacklistee. He had a brother, Don, who was a photographer. Ornitz studied film at the University of California, Los Angeles.

== Career ==
Ornitz made his directing debut with short film Wanted – A Master (1936), which was nominated for the Academy Award for Best Short Subject (One-Reel). He was a documentary cameraman for Joris Ivens and Floyd Crosby during the latter part of the decade. During World War II, he served in the US Army Signal Corps, under a unit commanded by Frank Capra.

During the 1950s, Ornitz lived in Denmark and worked with Danish filmmaker couple Astrid and Bjarne Henning-Jensen. His first American feature film was The Goddess (1958), directed by John Cromwell. During the decade, he also shot and directed various commercials.

Among other films, he shot The Connection (1961), A Thousand Clowns (1965), Charly (1968), The Boys in the Band (1970), The Anderson Tapes, Minnie and Moskowitz (both 1971), Serpico (1973), Death Wish (1974), Next Stop, Greenwich Village (1976), An Unmarried Woman (1978), and Hanky Panky (1982).

Victor J. Kemper cited him as a mentor.

== Death ==
Ornitz died of cancer at his home in Manhattan on July 10, 1985. He was survived by his mother, his wife and a son. Ornitz's son, Kim H. Ornitz, is a sound mixer.

== Filmography ==
=== Film ===
==== Feature films ====
Year	Title	Director	Notes
1950	North Sea Boys	Astrid Henning-Jensen; Bjarne Henning-Jensen	
1951	Kranes konditori	Astrid Henning-Jensen	
1951	Ukjent mann	Astrid Henning-Jensen	
1952	Vi arme syndere	Erik Balling; Ole Palsbo	
1958	The Goddess	John Cromwell	
1959	Kiss Her Goodbye	Albert Lipton	
1960	The Pusher	Gene Milford	
1961	The Connection	Shirley Clarke	
1961	Teenage Millionaire	Lawrence Doheny	
1961	The Young Doctors	Phil Karlson	
1962	Jacktown	William Martin	
1962	Requiem for a Heavyweight	Ralph Nelson	
1963	Act One	Dore Schary	
1964	The World of Henry Orient	George Roy Hill	
1965	The Colonial Naturalist — Mark Catesby	Charles S. Dubin	
1965	A Thousand Clowns	Fred Coe	
1967	A Midsummer Night's Dream	George Balanchine; Dan Eriksen	
1967	The Tiger Makes Out	Arthur Hiller	
1968	Charly	Ralph Nelson	
1969	Me, Natalie	Fred Coe	
1969	Change of Mind	Robert Stevens	
1970	The Boys in the Band	William Friedkin	
1970	House of Dark Shadows	Dan Curtis	
1970	Soldier Blue	Ralph Nelson	Replaced by Robert B. Hauser
1971	The Anderson Tapes	Sidney Lumet	
1971	Minnie and Moskowitz	John Cassavetes	
1972	The Possession of Joel Delaney	Waris Hussein	
1973	Black Snake	Russ Meyer	
1973	Serpico	Sidney Lumet	
1973	Badge 373	Howard W. Koch	
1974	Death Wish	Michael Winner	
1974	Law and Disorder	Ivan Passer	
1974	Forever Young, Forever Free	Ashley Lazarus	
1976	Next Stop, Greenwich Village	Paul Mazursky	
1977	Thieves	John Berry	
1978	An Unmarried Woman	Paul Mazursky	
1978	Oliver's Story	John Korty	
1981	The Chosen	Jeremy Kagan	
1981	Tattoo	Bob Brooks	
1982	Hanky Panky	Sidney Poitier	

==== Short films ====
Year	Title	Director	Notes
1936	Wanted – A Master	Himself	Co-director with Gunther von Fritsch
1940	Power and the Land	Joris Ivens	Docuementary short
1949	I gode hender	Himself	
1960	The Computer Comes to Marketing	Maurice Rapf	
1961	The Shoes	Ernest Pintoff	
1961	After Hours	Shepard Traube	Docuementary short

=== Television ===
==== TV series ====
Year	Title	Notes
1955	Omnibus	Episode: "Uncle Tom's Cabin"
1957-58	Harbourmaster	2 episodes
1958	Decision	Episode: "Man Against Crime"
1964	East Side West Side	Episode: "It's War, Man"
1970	NET Playhouse	Episode: "Helen Hayes Remembers"

==== TV films, miniseries, and specials ====
Year	Title
1956	Bulletin from Bertie
1956	Out of Darkness
1964	Carol for Another Christmas
1973	Honor Thy Father
1977	The Quinns
1977	Wilma
1979	Mayflower: The Pilgrims' Adventure
1980	Hardhat and Legs
1980	Playing for Time
1982	The Royal Romance of Charles and Diana
1983	Jacobo Timerman: Prisoner Without a Name, Cell Without a Number
1983	First Affair
