= Chantilly Lace (film) =

1993 film by Linda Yellen

- Promotional poster
- Genre: Drama
- Written by: Gisela Bernice; Rosanne Ehrlich; Linda Yellen
- Directed by: Linda Yellen
- Starring: JoBeth Williams; Helen Slater; Martha Plimpton; Ally Sheedy; Jill Eikenberry; Talia Shire; Lindsay Crouse
- Music by: Patrick Seymour
- Country of origin: United States

Production
- Producers: Rosanne Ehrlich; Linda Yellen; Kathy Zotnowski
- Production location: Sundance, Utah
- Cinematography: Paul Cameron
- Editor: Christopher Cooke
- Running time: 101 minutes
- Production company: Showtime Networks

Original release
- Network: Showtime
- Release: July 18, 1993

Chantilly Lace is a 1993 American made-for-television drama film shot in Sundance, Utah, for the Showtime Network and eventually released on video via Columbia TriStar Home Entertainment. The film was directed by Linda Yellen and features dialogue that was largely improvised by its ensemble cast. It had its television premiere on Showtime on July 18, 1993.

== Plot ==
Several female friends gather at a Colorado Rockies vacation home over the course of a year. The women include Natalie, a film critic who is turning 40, as well as Hannah, an artist who is married to Natalie's ex-husband. There is also Val, a woman in an unhappy marriage, and Val's closeted lesbian younger sister Elizabeth, who brings along her photojournalist friend Anne. Rounding out the group are Maggie, a nun who is having a crisis of faith, and Rheza, a recent divorcée.

During the story, the group meets three times, with the first occasion being a celebration of Natalie's 40th birthday. The second occasion is to celebrate one's engagement, while the third gathering is to grieve one's death. Throughout the gatherings, secrets are divulged, tensions are rehashed, and friendships are tested and reaffirmed.

== Cast ==
- JoBeth Williams as Natalie
- Helen Slater as Hannah
- Lindsay Crouse as Rheza
- Talia Shire as Maggie
- Jill Eikenberry as Val
- Ally Sheedy as Elizabeth
- Martha Plimpton as Anne
- Matt Battaglia as Chris the pizza boy

== Production ==
Inspired by Christa Wolf's Cassandra, Yellen said she originally conceived of Chantilly Lace because of the preponderance of "incomplete roles for women, who are sketched instead of developed" in the movie business. She further developed it at the Sundance Film Institute, while Showtime provided production financing.

Yellen worked from a 40-page outline — instead of a screenplay — to extract improvisation from her performers.

The film, often compared to The Big Chill, was shot over eight days. Parts of the film were shot at the Sundance Institute in Provo Canyon, Utah. The two-hour film was composed from 28 hours' worth of film.

In addition to its all-female ensemble cast, the film is considered notable for the complete absence of any men in the film whatsoever, except for the brief appearance of a pizza-delivery man who remains faceless to the camera. This choice led critics to compare the film to George Cukor's The Women, another production that was notable for its absence of male characters.

== Themes ==
The Sundance director of feature film, Michelle Satter, said the film explores the landscape of contemporary women's issues with humor and honesty "unlike any American film" that she had seen.

== Reception ==
In a review for Variety, Emanuel Levy wrote, "The most interesting aspect of this production is how it struggles, and for the most part succeeds, in avoiding the temptation and confines of the sitcom format. As co-writer and helmer, [Linda] Yellen reveals a sensitive ear for women’s complexities and idiosyncracies. There are three standouts in the uniformly accomplished cast: Williams, Sheedy and Plimpton."

Scott Williams, writing for the Associated Press, said the film "is simply magnificent. 'Chantilly Lace' is intimately about women. It is filled with them and their relationships. They are nuanced and subtle, with surfaces, revelations and hidden things. They are fully formed and detailed characters, and their story is powerful, honest and affecting."

The Los Angeles Times wrote "Performances fall in the good to terrific range.” The Washington Post writes that it's "an unusual movie about acceptance, tolerance, support, sex and fun among a group of longtime female friends who meet for three weekends within a year. Women viewers are not likely to be surprised by their conversation; men may be."

Ken Tucker of Entertainment Weekly said the film was "the only kind of feminist slant that gets much exposure on television: well-to-do white women grousing about horrible men and about their mostly unfulfilled needs to be creative." A critic for Deseret News, a publication associated with the Mormon Church, found the frank talk amongst the women about sex and men to be vulgar.

== Sequel ==
In December 2019, filming of a sequel took place, reuniting members of the original cast. The sequel, titled Chantilly Bridge, premiered at the 2022 SXSW Film Festival.
