= Samuel Ornitz =

American novelist (1890–1957)

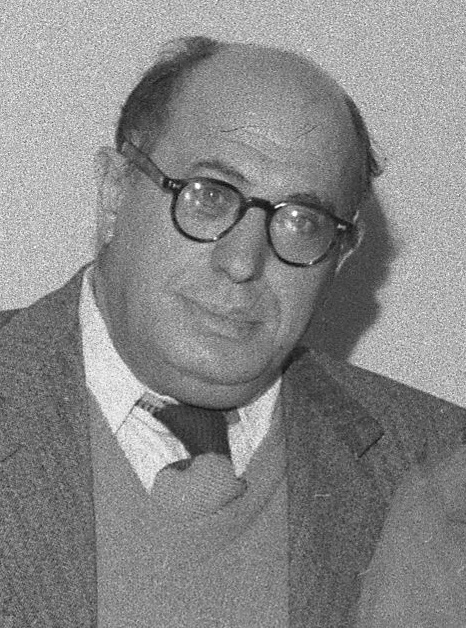
- Ornitz in 1947
- Born: Samuel Badisch Ornitz; November 15, 1890; New York City, U.S.
- Died: March 10, 1957 (aged 66); Woodland Hills, California, U.S.
- Occupation: Screenwriter
- Spouse: Sadie Lesser
- Children: Arthur J. Ornitz; Don Ornitz

Samuel Badisch Ornitz (November 15, 1890 – March 10, 1957) was an American screenwriter and novelist from New York City; he was one of the "Hollywood Ten" who were blacklisted from the 1950s on by movie studio bosses after his appearance before the House Un-American Activities Committee when he was held in contempt of Congress for refusing to testify about his alleged membership in the Communist Party. In his later years, he wrote novels, including Bride of the Sabbath (1951), which became a bestseller.

== Early life and education ==
Born to a Jewish family in 1890 in New York City, New York, the son of immigrants from Eastern Europe. Ornitz attended public schools and Hebrew School. His father became a successful dry goods merchant who wanted his sons to go into business with him. From an early age, Ornitz became interested in socialism, giving street talks at the age of 12, and writing.

== Work ==
Unlike his brothers, Ornitz was not interested in following their father into business. At the age of 18 he began work as a social worker for the New York Prison Association (1908–14). He next worked for the Brooklyn Society for the Prevention of Cruelty to Children (1914–20).

== Writing career ==
Ornitz started writing plays, and had The Sock performed in 1918. His Deficit was produced by the People's Playhouse in New York City in 1919.

His first literary success was his debut novel Haunch Paunch and Jowl (1923), an "anonymous autobiography" about his Jewish roots, which gained national notice. It contains an early use of stream-of-consciousness writing in American fiction, a technique originated by Irish writer James Joyce in his novel Ulysses.

In 1928, Ornitz moved to California to work in motion pictures, which was a booming industry as "talkies" were being introduced. The next year he worked on his first screenplay for a Hollywood film. Up until 1945, he wrote or co-wrote another twenty-nine screenplays. These included The Case of Lena Smith (1929), Chinatown Nights (1929), Hell's Highway (1932), Imitation of Life (1934), about a young mixed-race woman who passes as white; Mark of the Vampire (1935), Follow Your Heart (1936), Army Girl (1938), Little Orphan Annie (1938), They Live in Fear (1944), about Nazi Germany; and Circumstantial Evidence (1945).

In 1931, Ornitz collaborated with Theodore Dreiser, John Dos Passos and other left-leaning writers on the report of the Dreiser Committee, an investigation of the Harlan County War, a miners' strike in Harlan County, Kentucky that was violently suppressed by private police hired by mine owners. This inspired his short play, "A New Kentucky", published in The New Masses in April 1934. In 1933, he joined with Lester Cole and John Howard Lawson, both also later members of the Hollywood Ten, as founders of the Screen Writers Guild.

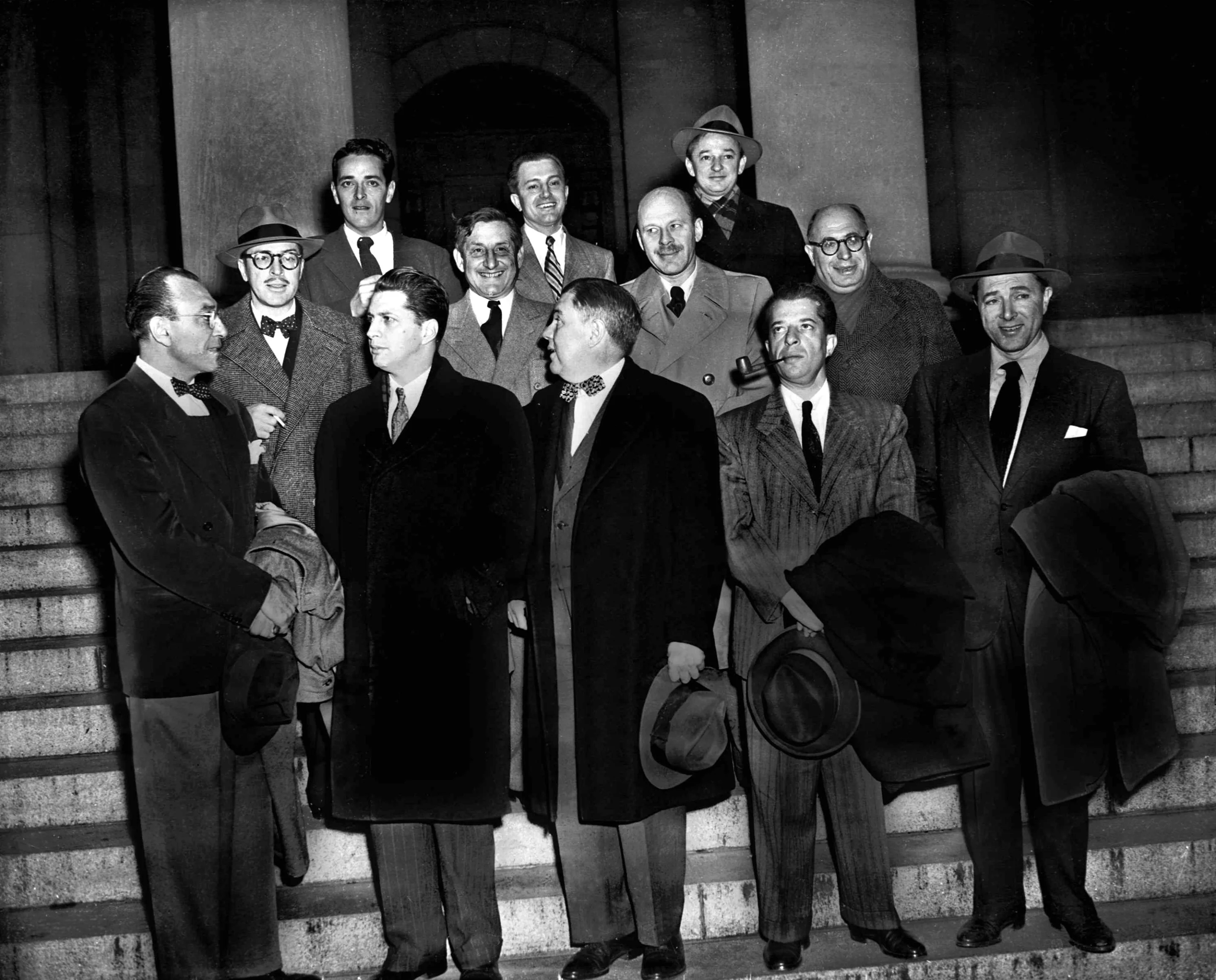
"The Hollywood Ten" stand with their attorneys outside district court in Washington, D.C. before arraignment on contempt of Congress charges. The ten were charged for refusing to cooperate with the House Un-American Activities Committee. (Front row, L-R): Herbert Biberman, attorney Martin Popper, attorney Robert W. Kenny, Albert Maltz and Lester Cole. (Second row, L-R): Dalton Trumbo, John Howard Lawson, Alvah Bessie and Samuel Ornitz. (Top row, L-R): Ring Lardner Jr., Edward Dmytryk and Adrian Scott.

In 1947, Ornitz was blacklisted from Hollywood and later sent to prison for refusal to testify before Congress in regard to membership in the communist party. Evidence presented in the hearing showed that Ornitz had been a member of the American Communist Party since at least 1944. Shortly after his release from prison, in 1951, Ornitz published Bride of the Sabbath, a novel. The novel described the Lower East Side's Jewish community as a place of charm and beauty, while also critiquing its insularity and sectarianism. Reviewers praise his rich description of Jewish quarter's physical environment, and report that he "wrote about the Sabbath with the veneration of an awestruck child." The novel portrays the protagonists' journey from Jewish Orthodoxy to liberal Tolstoyan Christianity as a journey of growth.

Samuel Ornitz died of cancer in 1957 in Woodland Hills, California, aged 66.

The Samuel Ornitz papers, 1919—57 are at the Wisconsin Center for Theatre Research, including original manuscripts of his novels.

== Selected filmography ==
- Secrets of the French Police (1932)
- One Exciting Adventure (1934)
