= Don Ornitz =

American photographer

- Born: February 29, 1920; New York City, U.S.
- Died: January 14, 1972 (aged 51); Los Angeles County, California, U.S.
- Occupation: Photographer
- Parent: Samuel Ornitz (father)
- Relatives: Arthur J. Ornitz (brother)

Don Ornitz (February 29, 1920 – January 14, 1972) was an American photographer.

== Life and career ==
Ornitz was born in New York City, to parents Sadie (née Lesser) and screenwriter Samuel Ornitz, one of the Hollywood Ten accused of Communism. As were many members of the entertainment community including Don's father, Samuel Ornitz was called before the House Un-American Activities Committee, but refused to testify and was fined $1,000. Don's brother was a cinematographer Arthur J. Ornitz. In 1928, the family moved to California, where he spent most of his life.

== Career ==
Ornitz photographed many celebrities, including Raquel Welch, Inger Stevens, Frank Sinatra, Walt Disney, and Audrey Hepburn. His obituary in Popular Photography magazine called him "the Titan of the Hollywood photographers".

He was also a photographer for several magazines, including Playboy, Travel and Camera, The Saturday Evening Post, Look, Pageant, Globe, Sports Illustrated and Life.

His photograph of boys catching insects on a windowpane was selected by Edward Steichen for the 1955 Museum of Modern Art world-touring exhibition The Family of Man that was seen by 9 million visitors.

Ornitz died January 14, 1972, in Los Angeles County, California.

== Books by Don Ornitz ==
- Ornitz, D. (1962) Living Photography, Maco.
- Basch, P., Gowland, P., & Ornitz, D. (1958). Candid Photography. Fawcett Publications: Greenwich, Conn.
