= Linda Yellen =

American film producer

- Born: New York City, U.S.
- Education: Barnard College, B.A. Columbia University, MFA & PhD.
- Occupations: Film/television director, producer and writer
- Years active: 1971–present

Linda Yellen is an American director, producer and writer of film and television, (born in New York City).

As a producer some of her credits are Playing for Time (1980), The Royal Romance of Charles and Diana (1982) and Second Serve (1986).

Some of her credits as a director include Northern Lights (1997), The Simian Line (2001), William & Catherine: A Royal Romance (2011) and The Last Film Festival (2016) which stars Dennis Hopper in his final acting role.

Linda's projects have received 2 Peabodys, 7 Emmys, including a Primetime Emmy Award as a producer for Playing for Time in 1981, 1 Silver Nymph and 2 Christophers. She is an alumna of Barnard College and Columbia University. Linda's films have been shown at Cannes, Sundance , New York, Hamptons, Monte Carlo, Aspen, Banff, Palm Springs, Nashville, Santa Fe International, and Deauville Film Festivals. Additionally, Linda's projects have been nominated for a Golden Globe and a Writers Guild Award. Linda Yellen is the recipient of Barnard's Woman of Achievement Award.

Her most recent film, One Stupid Thing, won Best Director and Best Picture at Boston International Film Festival and Jersey Shore Film Festival, Best Picture at Edinburgh Film Awards, and is an Official Selection at Newport Beach Film Festival.

== Filmography ==
Film

| Year | Title | Director | Writer | Notes |
|---|---|---|---|---|
| 1971 | Come Out, Come Out! | Yes | Yes | No |
| 1977 | Looking Up | Yes | No | Yes |
| 1993 | Chantilly Lace | Yes | Yes | Yes |
| 2002 | The Simian Line | Yes | Yes | Yes |
| 2016 | The Last Film Festival | Yes | Yes | Yes |
| 2018 | Fluidity | Yes | Yes | Yes |
| 2022 | Chantilly Bridge | Yes | Yes | No |
| 2024 | One Stupid Thing | Yes | Yes | No |

Short film

- Prospera (1976)
- The Spilling (2017)

TV movies

| Year | Title | Director | Producer | Writer |
|---|---|---|---|---|
| 1979 | Mayflower: The Pilgrims' Adventure | No | Executive | No |
| 1980 | Hardhat and Legs | No | Yes | No |
| 1980 | Playing for Time | No | Yes | No |
| 1982 | The Royal Romance of Charles and Diana | No | Executive | Yes |
| 1983 | Jacobo Timerman: Prisoner Without a Name, Cell Without a Number | Yes | Yes | Yes |
| 1986 | Second Serve | No | Executive | No |
| 1988 | Liberace: Behind the Music | No | Executive | No |
| 1989 | Hunt for Stolen War Treasures | No | Executive | No |
| 1989 | Sweet Bird of Youth | No | Executive | No |
| 1994 | Parallel Lives | Yes | Yes | Yes |
| 1995 | End of Summer | Yes | Yes | Yes |
| 1997 | Northern Lights | Yes | No | Yes |
| 2011 | William & Catherine: A Royal Romance | Yes | Yes | Yes |
