= Haunted Forest (2007 film) =

- Directed by: Mauro Borrelli
- Written by: Mauro Borrelli
- Produced by: Mauro Borrelli
- Starring: Sevy Di Cione; Kiralee Hayashi; Edoardo Beghi
- Cinematography: Mauro Borrelli
- Edited by: John C. Brookins
- Music by: Gianluca Piersanti
- Production company: Fotocomics Productions
- Distributed by: Lionsgate
- Release date: June 26, 2007
- Running time: 81 minutes
- Country: United States
- Language: English

Haunted Forest is a 2007 American Horror film directed by Mauro Borrelli and starring Sevy Di Cione, Adam Green and Kiralee Hayashi. The film premiered at the Oxford International Film Festival on April 6, 2007. Shot entirely in California and Nevada, it is produced by Fotocomics Productions and released in the U.S. by Lionsgate.

== Plot ==
Driven by his grandfather's mysterious past, Sean (Sevy Di Cione) searches for the key to a man's sudden disappearance within a dark forest. He believes it may have a connection to an enigmatic tree that now haunts his dreams. Sean's friends (Adam Green and Edoardo Beghi), along with two young women, accompany him on his quest. Things soon turn deadly as Satinka, a beautiful and vengeful spirit, wreaks her revenge for an unspeakable crime committed over 200 years ago. This hurls the group into a foreboding ecological nightmare, on a road straight to Hell.

== Cast ==
- Sevy Di Cione as Sean/Nodin
- Adam Green as Josh
- Mark Hengst as McCane
- Edoardo Beghi as Flipp
- Naomi Ueno as Kiyomi
- Jennifer Luree as Jennifer
- Hans Uder as Tourist
- Kiralee Hayashi as Satinka
