= Patrick Seymour =

British songwriter

Patrick Seymour (often credited as Pat Seymour) is a classically trained British songwriter and keyboard player. He has worked as a live and session musician with various artists, and was most notably part of Eurythmics' backing band in the 1980s.

After completing a degree in classical music at Oxford University, he first arrived on the UK music scene as part of the British funk band UK Players, whose debut album No Way Out was released on A&M Records in 1982. Changing record labels to RCA in 1983 brought him into contact with the RCA duo Eurythmics, whom he joined as keyboard player for their world tour in 1984. He continued to record and tour with Eurythmics until the end of the decade, and also co-wrote tracks for their albums Revenge (1986) and We Too Are One (1989) as well as collaborating with Eurythmics' Dave Stewart on the Lily Was Here soundtrack (1989).

Seymour's other collaborations include:

- The Pretenders - Get Close
- Mick Jagger - Primitive Cool
- Bob Dylan - Knocked Out Loaded
- Culture Club - Colour By Numbers
- Daryl Hall - Three Hearts in the Happy Ending Machine
- Belinda Carlisle - Live Your Life Be Free
- Bob Geldof - Deep in the Heart of Nowhere
- Kiki Dee - Angel Eyes

Seymour composed the song "Sleep Like a Child" that was recorded by Joss Stone for her 2004 album Mind Body & Soul. He was also co-writer of the 1989 Shakespears Sister hit "You're History".

He has also composed music scores for film and television, including Anne Rice's Feast of All Saints, The Simian Line, Me and Isaac Newton, The Johnsons, and also arranged and conducted the music score by Badly Drawn Boy for the film About a Boy.
