= William Maynard =

William Maynard may refer to:

- William Maynard, 1st Baron Maynard (1586–1640)
- William Maynard, 2nd Baron Maynard (1620s–1689)
- William Maynard (footballer) (1853–1921), English football player
- Sir William Maynard, 1st Baronet (1641–1685), English MP for Essex 1685
- Sir William Maynard, 4th Baronet (1721–1772), English MP for Essex 1759–1772
- William S. Maynard (1802–1866), U.S. politician
- William H. Maynard (1786–1832), American lawyer, newspaper editor and politician from New York
- Bill Maynard (1928–2018), English actor and comedian
