= Viscount Maynard =

British viscountcy

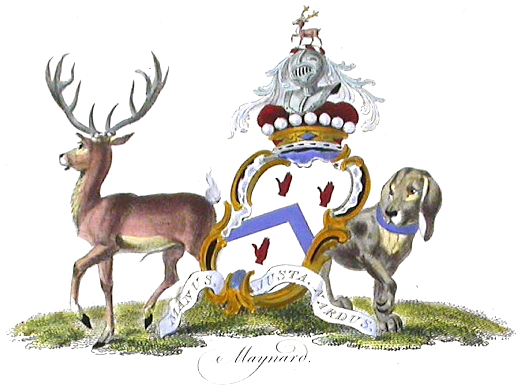
Canting arms of Maynard: Argent, a chevron azure between three hands gules

Viscount Maynard, of Easton Lodge in the County of Essex, was a title in the Peerage of Great Britain. It was created in 1766 for Charles Maynard, 6th Baron Maynard, Lord-Lieutenant of Suffolk. He was made Baron Maynard, of Much Easton (i.e. Great Easton) in the County of Essex, at the same time, also in the Peerage of Great Britain. Both titles were created with special remainder, failing male issue of his own, to his kinsman Sir William Maynard, 4th Baronet. The 1st Viscount was unmarried and on his death in 1775 the baronetcy of Easton Parva, the Irish barony of Maynard created in 1620 and the English barony of Maynard created in 1628 (see below) became extinct. He was succeeded in the barony of 1766 and the viscountcy according to the special remainder by his kinsman Sir Charles Maynard, 5th Baronet, who became the 2nd Viscount. The latter was succeeded by his nephew, the 3rd Viscount, who served as Lord-Lieutenant of Essex. He had no surviving male issue and on his death in 1865 the baronetcy, barony and viscountcy became extinct. His granddaughter, Daisy Maynard, daughter of Colonel Charles Henry Maynard and future wife of Francis Greville, 5th Earl of Warwick, succeeded to most of the Maynard estates.

The Maynard family descended from Sir Henry Maynard of Estaines, Essex, secretary to Lord Burghley and a Member of Parliament for Essex. His eldest son William Maynard was knighted in 1608 and in 1611 was created a Baronet, of Easton Parva (Latin, Little Easton) in the County of Essex, in the Baronetage of England. In 1620 he was elevated to the Peerage of Ireland as Lord Maynard, of Wicklow. In 1628 he was further honoured when he was made Baron Maynard, of Estaines in the County of Wicklow, in the Peerage of England. He was succeeded by his son, the 2nd Baron. He served as Comptroller of the Household and as Lord-Lieutenant of Cambridgeshire. On his death the titles passed to his eldest son, the 3rd Baron, who served as a Member of Parliament for Essex. Three of his sons, the 4th, 5th and 6th Barons, all succeeded to the title. The latter was made Viscount Maynard in 1766 (see above).

Sir John Maynard, another son of Sir Henry Maynard, represented Essex in the Long Parliament but was impeached for high treason, expelled from the House of Commons and imprisoned in the Tower of London. His younger brother, Charles Maynard, served as Auditor of the Exchequer during the reign of King Charles II. Charles's son, William Maynard, was created a Baronet, of Walthamstow in the County of Essex, in the Baronetage of England in 1682. Two of his sons, the 2nd and 3rd Baronets, both succeeded to the title. The latter's son was the aforementioned Sir William Maynard, 4th Baronet, whose son Sir Charles Maynard, 5th Baronet, succeeded his kinsman as 2nd Viscount Maynard in 1775. The Viscount William VCT, Lord William Maynard

== Barons Maynard (1620/1628) ==
- William Maynard, 1st Baron Maynard (c. 1589–1640)
- William Maynard, 2nd Baron Maynard (1623–1699)
- Banastre Maynard, 3rd Baron Maynard (1642–1718)
- Henry Maynard, 4th Baron Maynard (c. 1673–1742)
- Grey Maynard, 5th Baron Maynard (1679–1745)
- Charles Maynard, 6th Baron Maynard (c. 1690–1775) (created Viscount Maynard in 1766)

== Viscount Maynard (1766) ==
- Charles Maynard, 1st Viscount Maynard (c. 1690–1775)
- Charles Maynard, 2nd Viscount Maynard (1751–1824)
- Henry Maynard, 3rd Viscount Maynard (1788–1865)
  - Charles Henry Maynard (1814–1865)

== Maynard Baronets, of Walthamstow (1682) ==
- Sir William Maynard, 1st Baronet (c. 1640–1685)
- Sir William Maynard, 2nd Baronet (c. 1676–1715)
- Sir Henry Maynard, 3rd Baronet (d. 1738)
- Sir William Maynard, 4th Baronet (1721–1772)
- Sir Charles Maynard, 5th Baronet (1751–1824) (succeeded as 2nd Viscount Maynard in 1775)

Baronetage of England
Preceded by Mildmay Baronets	Maynard Baronets; 29 June 1611	Succeeded by Lee Baronets
