= Samuel L. Bensusan =

English born author, playwright and expert on country matters

Samuel Levy Bensusan (29 September 1872 – 11 December 1958) was a British author, musician, traveller, playwright, recorder of declining Essex dialects, and expert on country matters. He was born in Dulwich and died aged 86 at Hastings, and was the son of a Jewish feather merchant, Jacob Samuel Levy Bensusan (1846–1917) and Miriam Bensusan (1848–1926).

== Early life ==
Samuel Bensusan was the eldest son of Jacob Samuel Levy Bensusan (1846–1917), an ostrich feather merchant, and his wife Miriam Levy Bensusan (1848–1926). The family were of Orthodox Sephardic heritage, with ancestors giving distinguished service in Spain. Following his education at the City of London School and the Greater Ealing School he was articled to a London firm of solicitors. He was horrified at the harsh sentences imposed by the courts (a sensivity which he later expressed in a horror of cruelty to animals), and left the law to pursue a writing career. He had musical abilities and training, and became the music and drama critic for the Gentleman's Journal in 1893 and then The Illustrated London News. He was soon gaining commissions for articles published in other well known and successful journals including Vanity Fair and the Daily Sketch. The article Bensusan wrote in 1896 on the mistreatment of performing animals for the English Illustrated Magazine created a storm and, ultimately, led to the enactment of an Act of Parliament to prevent cruelty to performing animals. In 1897, in addition to his own writing, he took on the editorship of the Jewish World. In 1899 he started visiting and staying at a farmhouse in Asheldham in Essex in order to engage in country pursuits. Even though Bensusan wrote about the cultures and artists of many foreign lands, his engagement with the East Anglian land and people was to have a dramatic influence on his writing and research interests. Bensusan was to become an expert on the Essex dialect spoken in the area which only persisted because of the remoteness of the settlements. At this point in his career, Bensusan's writings were dominated by studies of famous artists, playwrights and foreign countries. His brother-in-law, the artist Lucien Pissarro who was married to his sister Esther, authored one, and Bensusan authored seven, of the 38 volumes of the illustrated works of artists in the series Masterpieces in Colour published in 1907.

== Essex ==
In 1900 Bensusan had a relationship with Fanny Barfoot, and a son was born to her on 14 December 1900. The boy was named Paul [Bernard] Selby (based on Bensusan's initials), and Bensusan accepted responsibility for his education and care.

In 1906, Bensusan cemented his connection with the county by acquiring a 50-acre farm near Great Easton, not far from Easton Lodge the home of Lord and Lady Warwick. Near neighbours also included H. G. Wells, Thomas Hardy and R. D. Blumenfeld (editor of the Daily Express) and Gustav Holst who lived for a time at Thaxted and developed an interest in folksong there. Bensusan was in contact, not only with these luminaries, but many others as is evident in letters to people such as Rudyard Kipling, Adrian Bell, Sidney Olivier and others who had an interest in land use, agriculture and country issues.

In 1909 he married Marian Lallah Prichard. (born 23 Apr 1883), nicknaming her "The Local Authority" and alternatively his "C[ommanding] O[fficer]. They had no children.

Being close to the Essex home of the Countess of Warwick, the Bensusans were part of the social scene associated with that lady including the theatrical, agrarian and horticultural interests she also had in common with Bensusan. Bensusan was said to be the ghost writer of some of the Countess's books. He was to write at least 25 books on agricultural matters and was briefly employed in the press department of the Board of Agriculture between 1919 and 1921. In the 1930s he and his wife lived at "Godfrey's", a gamekeeper's cottage at Langham, near Colchester. Bensusan developed an interest in recording the local East Anglian dialects and incorporated such diction in some of the plays and novels he wrote, for example, Joan Winter (1933), Right Forward Folk (1949) and Marshland Voices (1955).

Meanwhile, after "the long years of hard work" when he travelled to southern Europe, north Africa, western Asia, and America from the Atlantic to the Pacific, he returned to Essex and purchased 50 acres of neglected farmland, where he encouraged wildlife and aimed to enhance arboriculture and agriculture, until this was interrupted by the Government initiatives for the (1939–1945) war (see Quiet Evening pp. 109–110).

As befitted a country gentleman, Bensusan served also as a local Justice of the Peace/magistrate (as recounted in Quiet Evening. pp. 106–107).

Bensusan was very concerned to reduce the suffering of animals through sport, pest control and slaughter, and made a bequest in his will to set up a society for reducing the effects of kosher slaughtering.

== Later years ==
Bensusan died in St Leonards-on-Sea [Hastings] in 1958, after a long illness; Marian survived him by six years.

== Publications ==
The OCLC World Catalogue lists almost 200 titles authored by Bensusan a sample of titles available to view online include:

- Morocco, 1904
- Charles Lamb: His homes and haunts, 1910
- Tintoretto, 1907
- William Shakespeare: His homes and haunts, 1912

His works on his beloved wildlife and people of rural Essex include

- Father William 1912 Edward Arnold, London
- Back of Beyond: a countryman's pre-war commonplace book 1946 Blandford Press, London (illustrated by Joan Rickarby)
- Late Harvest 1950 Routledge & Kegan Paul, London (illustrated by Joan Rickarby)
- Quiet Evening 1950 Blandford Press, London (illustrated by Joan Rickarby)
- A Marshland Omnibus 1954 Duckworth, London
