= Church tax =

State-imposed tax to fund churches

A church tax is a tax collected by the state from members of some Christian denominations to provide financial support of churches, such as the salaries of its clergy and to pay the operating cost of the church. It is related to the concept of tithes and offerings. Not all Christian countries have such a tax. In some countries that do, people who are not members of a religious community are exempt from the tax; in others it is always levied, with the payer often entitled to choose who receives it, typically the state or an activity of social interest.

The constitution of a number of countries could be and have been interpreted as both supporting and prohibiting the levying of taxes unto churches; prohibiting church tax could separate church and state fiscally, but it could also be favorable treatment by the government. The term "church tax" could mean a tax levied on a religious organisation by a state, or relate to tax exemptions and so on for churches, but this article is about a tax levied on individuals.

== Tithing ==
In the past it was usual for people to be expected to pay a part of their production (e.g., agricultural produce) or income to a church, a practice known as tithing. This was often obligatory. It is no longer enforced by civil rulers, but some religious organisations still expect or require their members to pay a tithe.

== Countries that levy a church tax ==
=== Austria ===
Every recognized religious group in Austria can collect church tax at a rate of 1.1%, though currently only the Catholic and Protestant churches make use of that opportunity. Church tax is compulsory for Catholics in Austria.

This tax was introduced into Austria by the German government in 1939 after the 1938 Anschluss (annexation of Austria into Germany). After Austria received national independence again after World War II the tax was retained in order to keep the churches independent of political powers.

=== Denmark ===
The members of the national Church of Denmark pay a church tax, called "kirkeskat". The rate varies among municipalities with a minimum of 0.4% and a maximum of 1.3% of taxable income in 2019. The tax is generally around 0.7% of taxable income. The collection of the church tax is administered by the Danish tax authorities, but the church tax is not considered as a genuine tax by, for example, Statistics Denmark, but as a "voluntary transfer from households to the state".

The church tax does not cover the entire budget of the Church of Denmark. An additional 9% is paid by the government through block grants ("bloktilskud"), which means that even people who are not members of the Church of Denmark finance its activities through taxes.

=== Finland ===
All members of the Evangelical Lutheran Church of Finland and the Finnish Orthodox Church, the two state churches of Finland, pay an income-based church tax of between 1% and 2% (average about 1.4%), depending on the municipality. Members can formally leave the church, becoming exempt from the tax from the following year. When surveyed, the most common reason for people to leave the church in Finland is to be exempted from the church tax.

=== Germany ===
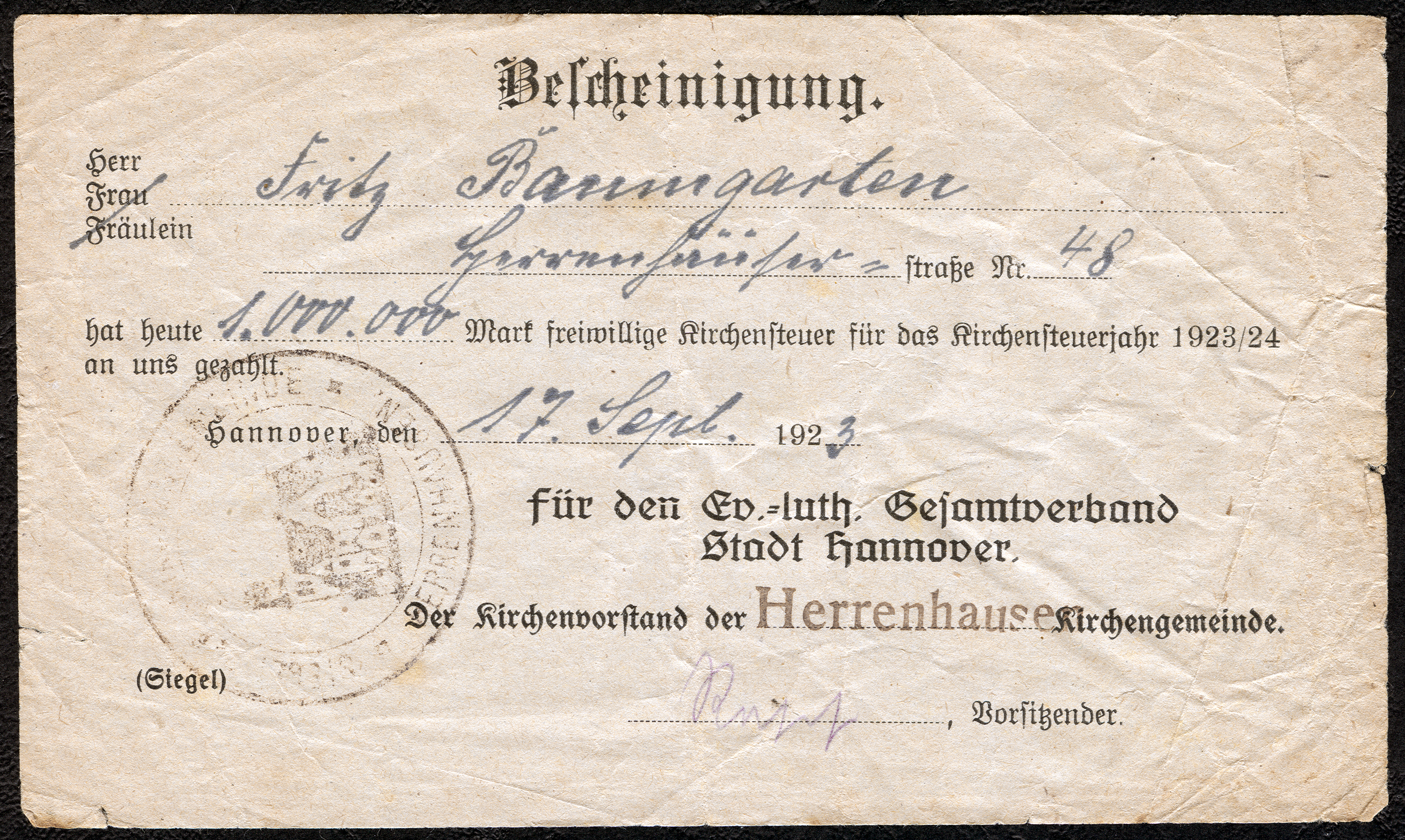
Receipt dated September 17, 1923

About 70% of church revenues come from church tax (Kirchensteuer), also called worship tax (Kultussteuer) when referring to non-Christian religious bodies such as Jewish synagogues. This was about €13.1 billion in 2022.

Article 137 of the Weimar Constitution of 1919 and article 140 of the German Basic Law of 1949 form the legal bases for this practice.

In Germany, on the basis of tax regulations passed by the religious communities and within the limits set by state laws, communities may either:

- require the taxation authorities of the state to collect the fees from the members on the basis of income tax assessment (then, the authorities withhold a collection fee), or
- choose to collect the church tax themselves.

In the first case, membership in the religious community is stored in a database at the Federal Tax Office which employers receive excerpts of for the purpose of withholding tax on paid income. If an employee's data indicate membership in a tax-collecting religious community, the employer must withhold church tax prepayments from their income in addition to other taxes. The state revenue authorities assess the church tax due at the annual tax assessment. State revenue authorities collect prepayment of church tax (and income tax) from self-employed persons and unemployed taxpayers.

If, however, religious communities choose to collect church tax themselves, they may demand that the tax authorities reveal taxation data of their members to calculate the contributions and prepayments owed. In particular, some smaller communities (e.g., the Jewish Community of Berlin) choose to collect taxes themselves to save collection fees the government would charge otherwise.

Church tax collected may be used to cover any church-related expenses such as funding institutions and foundations and paying ministers.

The church tax is only paid by members of the respective church, although the concept of "membership" is far from clear, and it may be asked what right the secular state has to tell the faithful what contribution they should make to their own denomination. People who are not members of a church tax-collecting denomination do not have to pay it. Members of a religious community may formally cease to be considered members by making a declaration to state (not religious) authorities, ending liability to pay church taxes. Some religious communities refuse religious marriages and funerals to members who leave.

The money flow of state and churches is distinct at all levels of the procedures. Income on which church tax is paid is not subject to state income tax (as are voluntary contributions to the Church, for charity or other privileged purposes), so that in effect the state subsidises the church to some extent. The cost to the state of collecting church tax is reimbursed by the church.

The church tax is historically rooted in the pre-Christian Germanic custom whereby the chief of the tribe was directly responsible for the maintenance of priests and religious groups. During the Christianization of Western Europe, this custom was adopted by the Catholic and Arian churches in the concept of "Eigenkirchen" (churches owned by the landlord), which stood in strong contrast to the central church organization of the Catholic Church. Despite the resulting medieval conflict between emperor and pope, the concept of church maintenance by the ruler remained the accepted custom in most Western European countries. In Reformation times the local princes in Germany became officially heads of the church in Protestant areas, and were legally responsible for the maintenance of churches. Not until the 19th century were the finances of churches and state regulated to a point where the churches became financially independent. At this point, the church tax was introduced to replace the state benefits the churches had obtained previously.

The church tax was reaffirmed in Article 13 of the Concordat between Nazi Germany and the Vatican, which guaranteed the right of the Church to levy taxes. Taxpayers, whether Catholic, Protestant or members of other tax-collecting communities, pay an amount equal to 8% in Bavaria and Baden-Württemberg, and 9% in the rest of the country, of their income tax to the church or religious community to which they belong. For example, a person earning €50,000 may pay income tax at 20% (€10,000); the church tax is an additional 8% (or 9%) of that sum (€800 or €900). The paid church tax is deductible in year of paying and reduces the taxable income.

Since 2015, private companies have to take part at the "church tax deduction procedure" ("Kirchensteuerabzugsverfahren"). This should ensure, that also shareholder of private companies pay church taxes on dividends. This regulation was introduced because capital gains in Germany can be taxed at a flat rate since 2009 and therefore do not have to be declared in the income tax return. There was therefore an enforcement deficit.

In 2017, Germany's Catholic church recorded approximately €6 billion tax take, split across its 27 different dioceses or church districts, despite a massive dip in attendance (according to the newspaper Handelsblatt, church attendance had dropped by more than 2.2 million since the start of the millennium). Fifty years before Catholic church attendance exceeded 11 million, but had dropped to 2.5 million. The German Church also has a total fortune of at least €20 billion. The three highest-income dioceses are Paderborn, at €3.5 billion, Munich at €2.8 billion, and Cologne at €2.6 billion.

People moving to Germany must declare their religious affiliation. The state-administered church tax is very successful at compelling tax payment, but many residents can avoid paying it, for example by not being a practising member of a faith. This has led to many people declaring they have abandoned the religion of their birth; it is not known what proportion do this only to avoid the tax.

=== Iceland ===
Taxpayers in Iceland who belong to an officially registered religious group or secular humanist organization must pay a congregation tax (Icelandic: sóknargjald, plural sóknargjöld) which is deducted from income taxes and goes to their organization. The sóknargjald of those who did not belong to any recognized religious organization formerly went to the University of Iceland. This was changed in 2009; people not belonging to a registered religious group or secular humanist organization must pay the same amount in tax, which is treated as income tax rather than paid to a church. In 2015, the monthly sóknargjald amounted to 824 krónur, about $US6. In March 2021, Judaism was added to Iceland’s list of state-recognised religious groups.

The Church of Iceland receives governmental support beyond the congregation taxes paid by its members.

=== Italy ===
Taxpayers in Italy pay a mandatory eight per thousand tax, and have the option to choose to whom they will assign the funds. This tax amounts to 0.8% of the total income tax (IRPEF) and every taxpayer can choose the recipient of the contribution on their tax form. Regardless of whether the taxpayer expresses a preference or not, the 0.8% is already included in their tax levy.

Currently the choices are:

- Italian State
- Catholic Church
- Waldensian Evangelical Church
- Seventh-day Adventist Church
- Assemblies of God in Italy
- Union of the Jewish Communities in Italy
- Lutheran Evangelical Church in Italy
- Baptist Evangelical Christian Union of Italy
- Greek Orthodox Archdiocese of Italy
- Apostolic Church in Italy (Pentecostalism)
- Italian Buddhist Union
- Italian Hindu Union
- Church of England

If the choice is not expressly declared on the tax form, the tax is distributed according to the percentages of the taxpayers who have declared their choice of beneficiary. While it was intended that the state should use its own share of the 0.8% tax for social or cultural purposes, in practice it has employed it for general purposes including its military mission in Iraq in 2004 and the upgrading of prison infrastructure in 2011.

=== Spain ===
The Spanish tax declaration form has a checkbox that allows the taxpayer to allocate 0.7% of their taxes to support the Catholic Church. This checkbox does not influence the total taxes paid; leaving the checkbox blank allocates the same money for general purposes.

=== Sweden ===
The members of Church of Sweden pay church fee, which varies between municipalities, but can be as much as 2%. Church and state are separated as of 2000; however, the burial tax (begravningsavgift) is paid by everyone regardless of membership.

In a recent development, the Swedish government has agreed to continue collecting from individual taxpayers the annual payment that has always gone to the church, if they opt in through a checkbox on the tax return. The government will allocate the money collected to Catholic, Muslim, Jewish and other faiths as well as the Lutherans, with each taxpayer directing where his or her taxes should go.

=== Switzerland ===
There is no official state church in Switzerland; under Article 72 of the Federal Constitution, the regulation of the relationship between church and state is a matter for the individual cantons. Except in Geneva and Neuchâtel, each canton recognizes certain religious communities under public law and financially supports them with funds collected through taxation—typically the Roman Catholic, the Evangelical Reformed, and, in a number of cantons, the Old Catholic (in Switzerland the Christian Catholic Church of Switzerland) and Jewish communities. Public-law recognition has generally not been extended to other faiths, such as Islam or Buddhism; a 2003 amendment to the constitution of the canton of Zürich that would have permitted the recognition and tax-levying of non-traditional communities was rejected by its voters.

The church tax is levied only on registered members of the recognised communities; a person of no religious affiliation does not pay it. What varies by canton is whether a member may decline the tax while remaining in the church or must instead formally leave the church, and in some cantons private companies are also unable to avoid payment of the church tax. The tax is assessed as a proportion of the cantonal or income tax and varies by canton and denomination—in Bern, for example, it is about 20.7 per cent of the income tax for Catholics and 18.4 per cent for Protestants. The taxation of legal entities has been politically contested, with cantons such as Bern and Zürich seeing initiatives to abolish it.

In Geneva and Neuchâtel there is no church tax; each taxpayer is free to make a voluntary, tax-deductible contribution or gift to their church, either directly to the beneficiary or through the cantonal tax system. In the canton of Vaud no church tax is levied; the canton instead meets the cost of church services from general taxation.

== Countries that have ended church taxes ==
=== United Kingdom ===
The United Kingdom abolished compulsory church rates with the Compulsory Church Rate Abolition Act 1868 (31 & 32 Vict. c. 109). Voluntary church taxes remain, with those unwilling to pay the rate being excluded from inquiring into, objecting to or voting in respect of their expenditure. Tithing was obligatory in England centuries ago.

=== France ===
France abolished the church tax in 1789.

=== Mexico ===
Mexico abolished the church tax in 1833.

=== United States ===
The English colonies which later became the United States had tax provisions to support religion, but the Constitution of the United States explicitly separates church and state, and no church tax is levied from citizens. Churches are generally exempt from paying taxes. The United States Supreme Court has held that tax exemption for churches is constitutional under the Establishment Clause and that churches and religious organizations may be subject to a general sales and use tax; however, the Court has not addressed whether government may enact a specific "church tax". The Establishment Clause of the US Constitution prohibits the US federal government and (through incorporation doctrine) the 50 state governments from establishing a state religion or favoring one religion over another.

Prior to American independence, most of the original colonies supported religious activities with taxes, with each colony often choosing a single church as their official religion. These official churches enjoyed privileges not granted to other religious groups. Massachusetts and Connecticut supported the Congregational church through tax. In colonial South Carolina, the Anglican Church benefited from church taxes. Other colonies would more generally support religion by requiring taxes that would partially fund religious institutions - taxpayers could direct payments to the Protestant denomination of their choosing. Only the colonies of Delaware, New Jersey, Pennsylvania and Rhode Island did not require a tax to support religion. During and after the American Revolution, religious minorities, such as the Methodists and the Baptists, argued that taxes to support religion violated freedoms won from the British. Defenders of the practice argued that government needed to fund religious institutions because public virtue depended on these institutions which could not survive purely on private support.

== See also ==
- Concordat
- 501(c)(3) organization, U.S. tax-exemption for churches, religious organizations, charities, and certain other nonprofit organizations
- Clergy housing allowance, income not subject to federal income tax that is paid to ordained ministers in both Canada and the United States
- Otto per mille
- Peter's Pence
- State religion
- Tithe
