= John Maynard (died 1658) =

English politician

Sir John Maynard K.B.
- Born: 1592
- Died: 1658 (aged 65–66); Tooting
- Occupations: lawyer and politician
- Parent: Sir Henry and Susan Maynard

Sir John Maynard K.B. (1592–1658) was an English politician.

== Origins ==
Maynard was the second son of Sir Henry Maynard, of Estaines Parva, in Essex, and Susan, the daughter of Thomas Pearson. His elder brother, William, was the first Lord Maynard. His early education is unknown, but it is known that he attended the Inner Temple in 1610.

== Political career ==
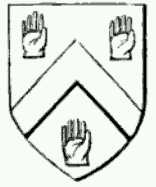
Arms for Maynard of Estaines Parva

Maynard was elected MP for Chippenham in March 1624 and 1625.

He was made a Knight of the Bath on 2 February 1626, the day of Charles I's coronation.

He was elected as Member of Parliament for Calne in 1626 and for Lostwithiel for the Long Parliament in 1646. He proposed that the army should be disbanded and on 16 June 1647, he was one of eleven members of the House of Commons charged by the army with obstructing the business of Ireland, acting against the army and against the laws and liberties of the subject, and with being obstructors of justice. On 20 July, leave of absence was granted to these members for six months and it is probable that Maynard left for the country. In 1648, he was imprisoned for a time in the Tower of London on charges of treason (though eventually released). While imprisoned, he addressed a remonstrance to the House of Lords, claiming his right to a trial by his peers.

== Death and posterity ==
Maynard ultimately inherited his father's estate in Tooting. He died on 29 July 1658 and is buried in Tooting Churchyard (along with his son and heir, also Sir John Maynard, who died in 1664). He married Mary, the daughter of Sir Thomas Myddelton, of Chirk Castle, Denbighshire, and had by her three sons and two daughters, four of whom died without issue. His daughter Anne married Sir John Musters of Colwick in Nottinghamshire. Sir John Maynard the Younger left an only daughter and heir, Mary, who married (first) William Adams, (secondly) Sir Rushout Cullen and (thirdly) Francis Buller of Chillingham, Cornwall.

Maynard is included in a very detailed etching: "Charles I Demanding in the House of Commons the Five Impeached Members".
