= Henry Maynard =

English politician (1547–1610)

Sir Henry Maynard
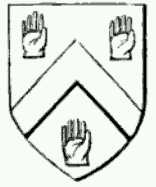
- Arms for Maynard of Estaines Parva
- Born: 1547
- Died: 1610 (aged 62–63)
- Resting place: Little Easton Church
- Occupations: politician, secretary and landowner
- Known for: secretary to Lord Burghley
- Spouse: Susan Pearson
- Parent(s): John and Dorothy Maynard

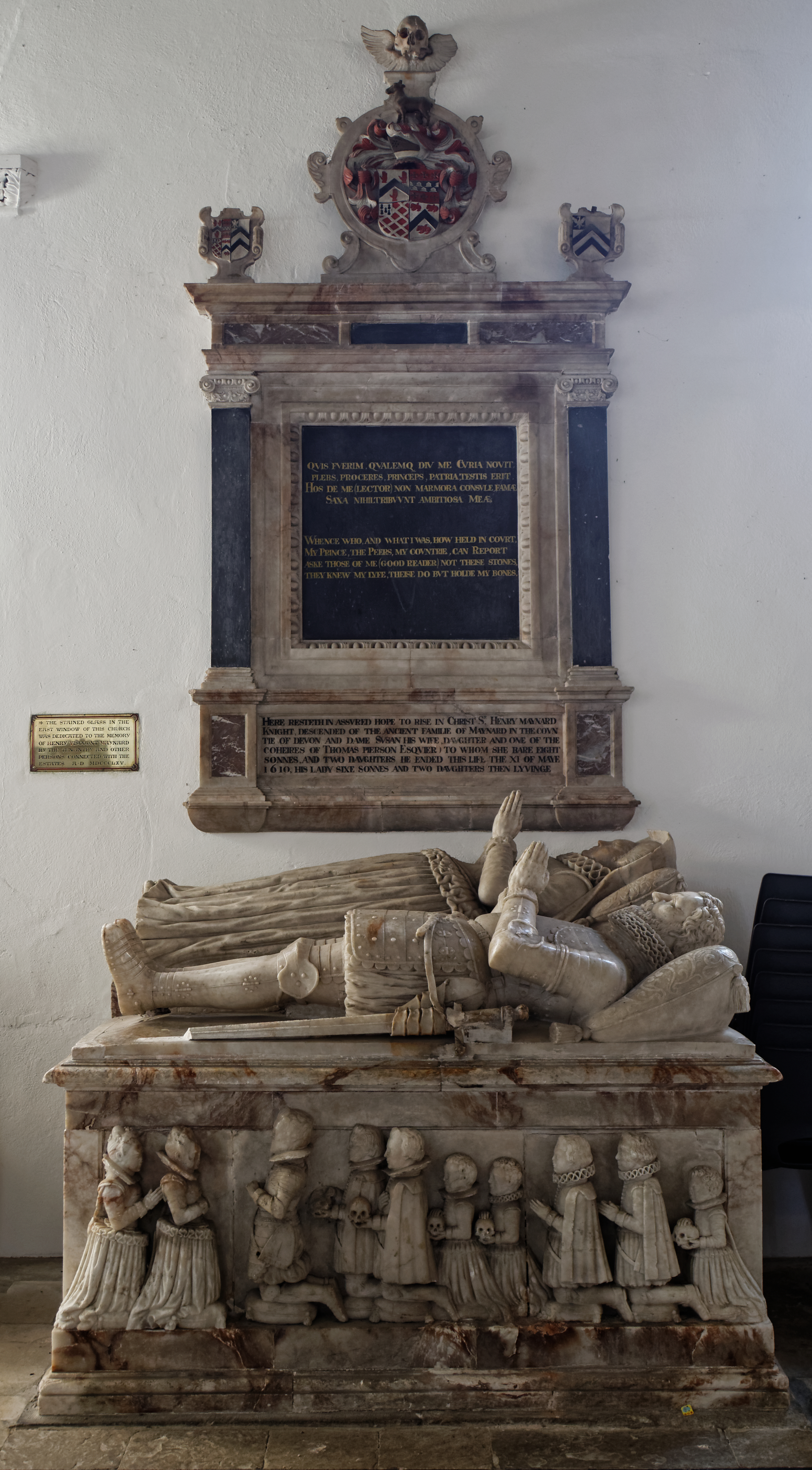
Henry Maynard monument in the Church of St Mary, Little Easton

Sir Henry Maynard (1547–1610) was an English politician and secretary to Lord Burghley, and became (by steady accretion) a substantial landowner.

== Origins ==
Maynard was the son of John Maynard, who had been MP for St Albans in the first Parliament of Mary I of England in 1553–1554 (being one of the 39 members who absented themselves, rather than acknowledge the authority of the Pope), and his second wife, Dorothy, daughter of Robert Perrot.

== Political career ==
He was secretary to Lord Burghley, the Lord High Treasurer, and by virtue of his position he was able to take advantage of troubled assets and gradually became a major landowner, especially in Essex. He served as MP for St. Albans in the parliaments of 1586, 1588, 1592 and 1597. "He sat on committees concerning recusancy, horse and cattle stealing, privileges, penal laws, painters and stainers, and fustians". He was also summoned to the parliament of 1601 as a knight of the shire for Essex. He was High Sheriff of Essex in the last year of Elizabeth’s reign (1603) and was knighted by her. In July 1603, following the accession of James I, he was appointed as Deputy Lieutenant for Essex (the new Lord Lieutenant being the Earl of Sussex). He also developed a reputation as a moneylender.

In 1595–96, he acquired the manor of Tooting Graveney from James Harrington. When the Queen visited in 1600, she was probably his guest.

== Family ==
He married Susan, the daughter and co-heir of Thomas Pearson, gentleman-usher of the Star Chamber (whose property included two inns in Queen Anne's Gate called the White Hart and the Saracen's Head), and had eight sons by her. The eldest, William, became the first Lord Maynard. Another, John, became a Knight of the Bath. Yet another son, Charles Maynard, was Auditor of the Exchequer during the reign of Charles II and the father of Sir William Maynard, 1st Baronet.

== Death and posterity ==
He made his will on 20 August 1609 and it was proved on 18 May 1610. Among other bequests, he left £2,000 to each of his daughters, Elizabeth and Mary, his London properties to his son Charles, and £500 and his leasehold properties in Warwickshire to his son Francis. He was buried at Little Easton, Essex, near Easton Lodge, a property granted to him by Queen Elizabeth in 1590.

His epitaph reads:

"Here resteth, in assured hope to rise in Christ, Henry Maynard, Knight, descended of the ancient family of Maynard, in the county of Devon; and Dame Susan, his wife, daughter and one of the coheirs of Thomas Pierson, Esq. to whom she bear eight sonnes and two daughters. He died 11 May 1610, and was survived by his wife, six sons, and two daughters, then living."

— Little Easton Church,
