= Banastre Maynard, 3rd Baron Maynard =

English politician

Banastre Maynard, 3rd Baron Maynard (c. 1642 – 3 March 1718) was an English politician who sat in the House of Commons from 1663 to 1679. He succeeded to the peerage as Baron Maynard in 1699.

== Life ==
Maynard was the second eldest son of William Maynard, 2nd Baron Maynard of Estaines and his first wife Dorothy Banastre, daughter of Sir Robert Banastre of Passenham, Northamptonshire. He travelled abroad in France, Italy, Germany and the Netherlands from 1660 to 1662. In 1663 he was elected Member of Parliament for Essex in a by-election to the Cavalier Parliament. He was commissioner for assessment for Essex from 1663 to 1680 and commissioner for recusants in 1675. He was a J.P. from April 1688 to his death and was commissioner for assessment for Essex again from 1689 to 1690. He succeeded to the peerage as Baron Maynard on the death of his father on 3 February 1699.

== Family ==
Maynard married Lady Elizabeth Grey, daughter of Henry Grey, 10th Earl of Kent and had eight sons and three daughters. Their children included:

- Henry Maynard, 4th Baron Maynard (c. 1673–1742)
- Grey Maynard, 5th Baron Maynard (1679–1745)
- Charles Maynard, 1st Viscount Maynard (c. 1690–1775)
- Annabella Maynard (d. 1734) who married Sir William Lowther, 1st Baronet

Parliament of England
Preceded by John Bramston; Sir Benjamin Ayloffe, Bt	Member of Parliament for Essex; 1663–1679; With: John Bramston	Succeeded by Sir Eliab Harvey; Henry Mildmay
Peerage of England
Preceded by William Maynard	Baron Maynard; 1699–1718	Succeeded by Henry Maynard
Peerage of Ireland
Preceded by William Maynard	Baron Maynard; 1699–1718	Succeeded by Henry Maynard
