= Custos Rotulorum of Essex =

This is a list of people who have served as custos rotulorum of Essex.

- Sir William Petre bef. 1544–1572
- Sir Anthony Cooke c. 1573–1576
- Sir Thomas Mildmay c. 1577–1608
- Thomas Howard, 1st Earl of Suffolk bef. 1621–1624
- Theophilus Howard, 2nd Earl of Suffolk 1624–1640
- William Maynard, 1st Baron Maynard 1640
- Robert Rich, 2nd Earl of Warwick 1640–1642
- James Hay, 2nd Earl of Carlisle 1642–1646, 1660
- Charles Rich, 4th Earl of Warwick 1660–1673
- William Maynard, 2nd Baron Maynard 1673–1688
- Thomas Petre, 6th Baron Petre 1688

For later custodes rotulorum, see Lord Lieutenant of Essex.
