= William Maynard, 2nd Baron Maynard =

English aristocrat

William Maynard, 2nd Baron Maynard (c. 1623 – 3 February 1688/89) was an English aristocrat. He served in the House of Commons until his impeachment by the army in 1647. He was Comptroller of the Household from 1672 to 1687 and Custos Rotulorum of Essex from 1673 to 1688.

== Personal life ==
Maynard the son of William Maynard, 1st Baron Maynard and Anne Everard. He married Dorothy Banastre. Their son, Hon. Banastre Maynard was elected in 1664 in a by-election to the Cavalier Parliament for Essex. He later married Lady Margaret Murray, daughter of William Murray, 1st Earl of Dysart and Catherine Bruce. He and Margaret had one daughter, Elizabeth who married Sir Thomas Brograve, 3rd Baronet on 26 January 1691–92 at the Chapel Royal in Whitehall, London.

Parliament of England
Preceded by George Lowe; Sir John Maynard	Member of Parliament for Calne; 1640; With: Walter Norborne	Succeeded by George Lowe; Hugh Rogers
Honorary titles
Preceded by The Earl of Warwick	Custos Rotulorum of Essex; 1673–1688	Succeeded by The Lord Petre
Court offices
Preceded by The Earl of Bradford	Comptroller of the Household; 1672–1687	Succeeded by The Lord Waldegrave
Peerage of England
Preceded by William Maynard	Baron Maynard; 1640–1689	Succeeded by Banastre Maynard
Peerage of Ireland
Preceded by William Maynard	Baron Maynard; 1640–1689	Succeeded by Banastre Maynard
