= Charles Maynard, 1st Viscount Maynard =

British noble (c. 1690 – 1775)

Charles Maynard, 1st Viscount Maynard (c. 1690 – 30 June 1775), styled Charles Maynard between 1699 and 1745 and known as The Lord Maynard between 1745 and 1766, was a British peer. He served as Lord-Lieutenant of Suffolk between 1763 and 1769.

Maynard was the son of Banastre Maynard, 3rd Baron Maynard, and Lady Elizabeth de Grey, daughter of Henry Grey, 10th Earl of Kent. He succeeded his elder brother in the barony in 1745. In 1763 he was appointed Lord-Lieutenant of Suffolk, a post he held until 1769. In 1766 he was created Baron Maynard, of Much Easton in the County of Essex, and Viscount Maynard, of Easton Lodge in the County of Essex, with remainder to his kinsman, Sir Charles Maynard, 5th Baronet, of Walthamstow.

Lord Maynard died unmarried in June 1775. On his death the baronetcy of Eaton Parva and baronies of Maynard created in 1620 and 1628 became extinct. He was succeeded in the barony of 1766 and viscountcy according to the special remainder by his kinsman, Sir Charles Maynard, 5th Baronet.

Honorary titles
Preceded by The Duke of Grafton	Lord-Lieutenant of Suffolk; 1763–1769	Succeeded by The Duke of Grafton
Baronetage of England
Preceded by Grey Maynard	Baronet (of Eaton Parva); 1745–1775	Extinct
Peerage of Ireland
Preceded by Grey Maynard	Baron Maynard; 1745–1775	Extinct
Peerage of England
Preceded by Grey Maynard	Baron Maynard; 1745–1775	Extinct
Peerage of Great Britain
New creation	Viscount Maynard; 1766–1775	Succeeded by Charles Maynard
New creation	Baron Maynard; 1766–1755	Succeeded by Charles Maynard
