= Sir William Maynard, 4th Baronet =

British politician and baronet

Sir William Maynard, 4th Baronet (19 April 1721 – 18 January 1772) of Waltons, Ashdon, Essex was a British politician and baronet.

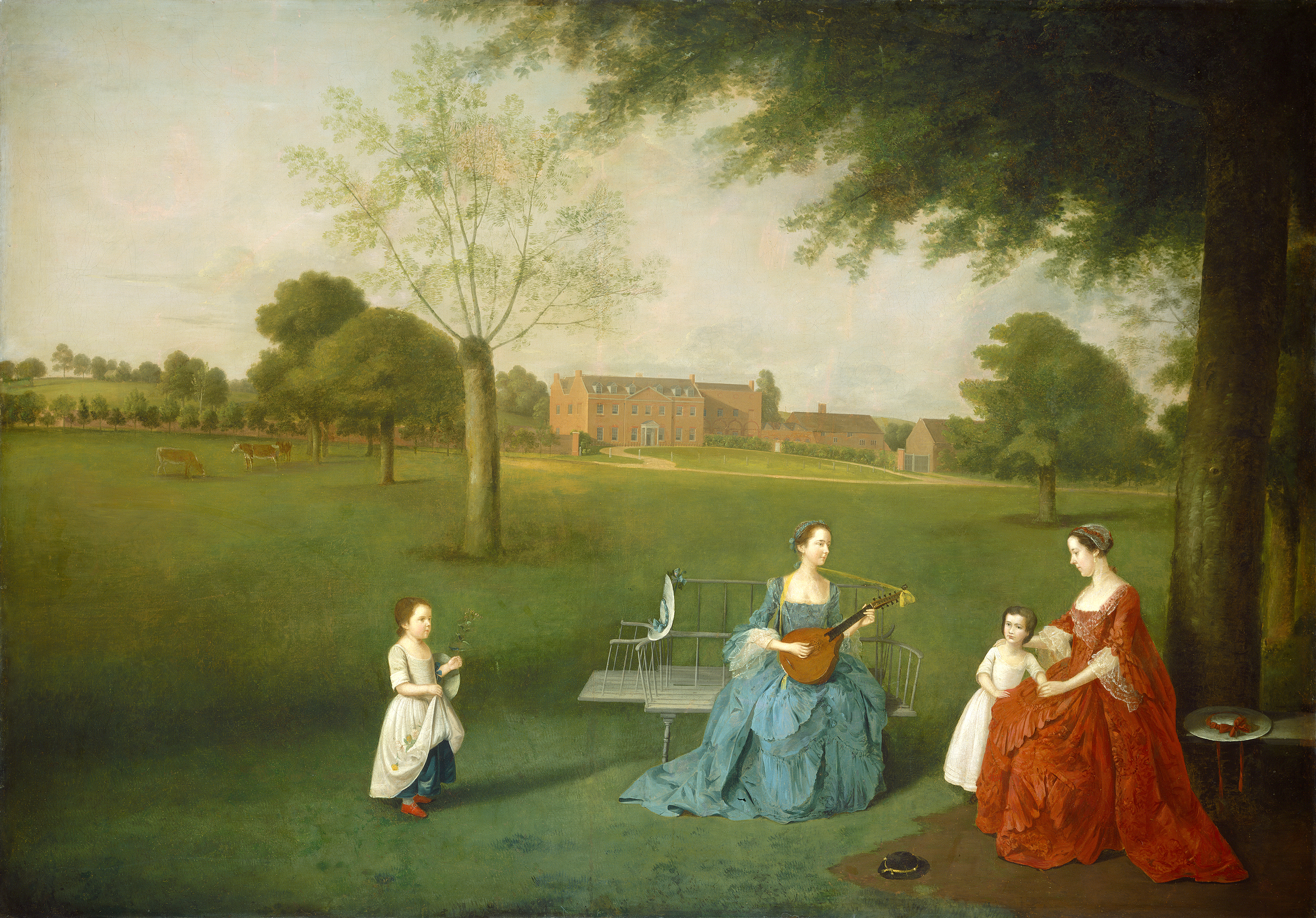
The Maynard Family at Waltons by Arthur Devis

He was the only son of Sir Henry Maynard, 3rd Baronet and his wife Catherine Gunter, daughter of George Gunter. In 1738, he succeeded his father as baronet. Maynard entered the British House of Commons as Member of Parliament (MP) for Essex in 1759, representing the constituency until 1772.

On 13 August 1751, he married Charlotte Bisshopp, second daughter of Sir Cecil Bishopp, 6th Baronet, and by her he had four children, three sons and one daughter. His oldest son Charles succeeded to the baronetcy, and by a special remainder also succeeded his kinsman Charles Maynard, 1st Viscount Maynard as 2nd Viscount Maynard in 1775.

Parliament of Great Britain
Preceded by William Harvey; Sir John Abdy	Member of Parliament for Essex; 1759–1772; With: William Harvey 1759–1763; John Luther 1763–1772	Succeeded by John Luther; John Conyers
Baronetage of England
Preceded by Henry Maynard	Baronet (of Walthamstow); 1738–1772	Succeeded by Charles Maynard
