= Henry Maynard, 3rd Viscount Maynard =

British peer

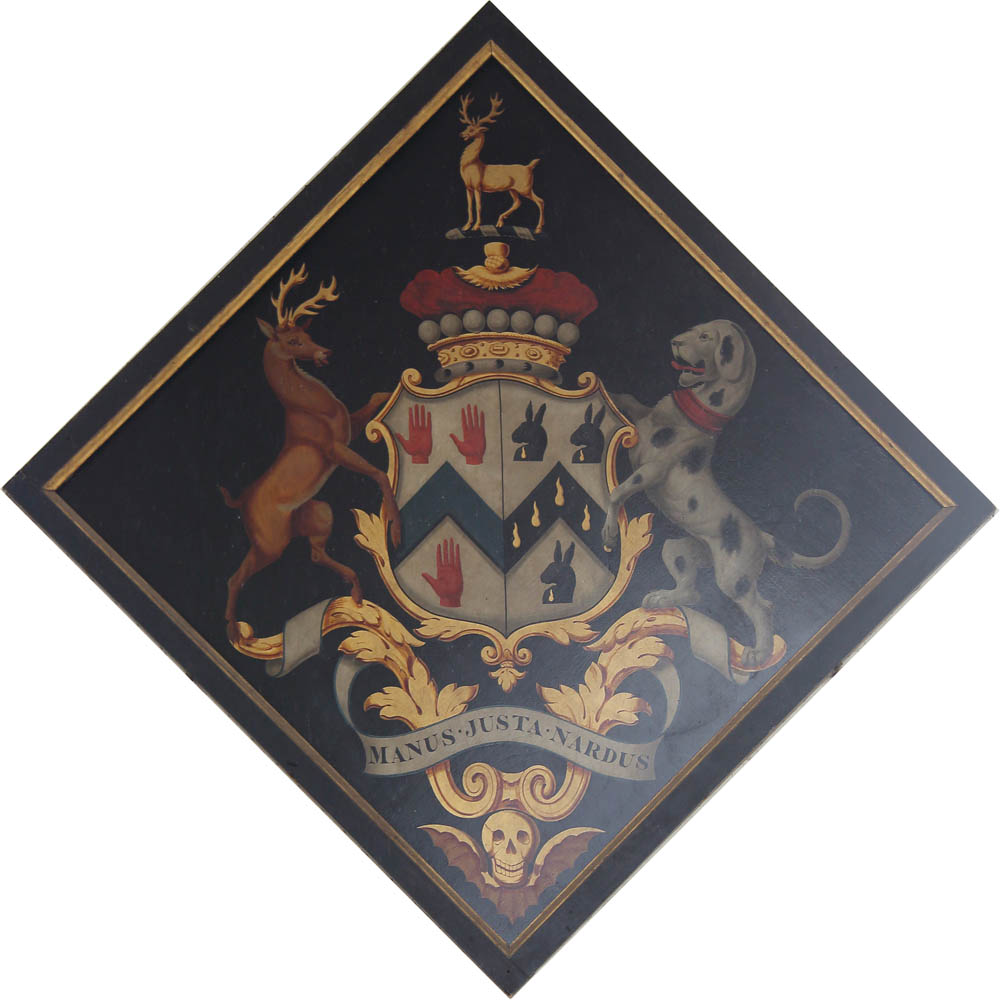
Funerary hatchment of Henry Maynard, 3rd Viscount Maynard, in St John the Baptist church in Thaxted, displaying his arms impaling the paternal arms of his wife, Mary Rabett

Henry Maynard, 3rd Viscount Maynard (13 March 1788 – 19 May 1865), was a British peer.

Maynard was appointed captain of the Western Battalion of the Essex Militia on 6 March 1808. On 30 January 1809, he was appointed a deputy lieutenant of Essex and resigned his militia commission on 25 April.

Maynard succeeded his uncle in the viscountcy in 1824. The following year he was appointed Lord Lieutenant of Essex, a post he held until his death. He married Mary Rabett, daughter of Reginald Rabett, of Branfield Hall, Suffolk, in 1810. She died in October 1857.

Their son, Colonel the Honourable Charles Henry Maynard, died in January 1865, leaving only daughters. Lord Maynard survived his son by four months and died in May 1865, aged 77, when the viscountcy became extinct.

His three-year-old granddaughter, Daisy Maynard, succeeded to most of the Maynard estates, including Easton Lodge. She later married Francis Greville, 5th Earl of Warwick.

Honorary titles
Preceded by The Lord Braybrooke	Lord Lieutenant of Essex; 1825–1865	Succeeded by The Lord Dacre
Preceded by The Lord Braybrooke	Vice-Admiral of Essex; 1825–1865	Succeeded by The Lord Dacre
Peerage of Great Britain
Preceded by Charles Maynard	Viscount Maynard; 1824–1865	Extinct
