= Daisy Greville, Countess of Warwick =

British aristocrat (1861–1938)

The Right Honourable The Countess of Warwick
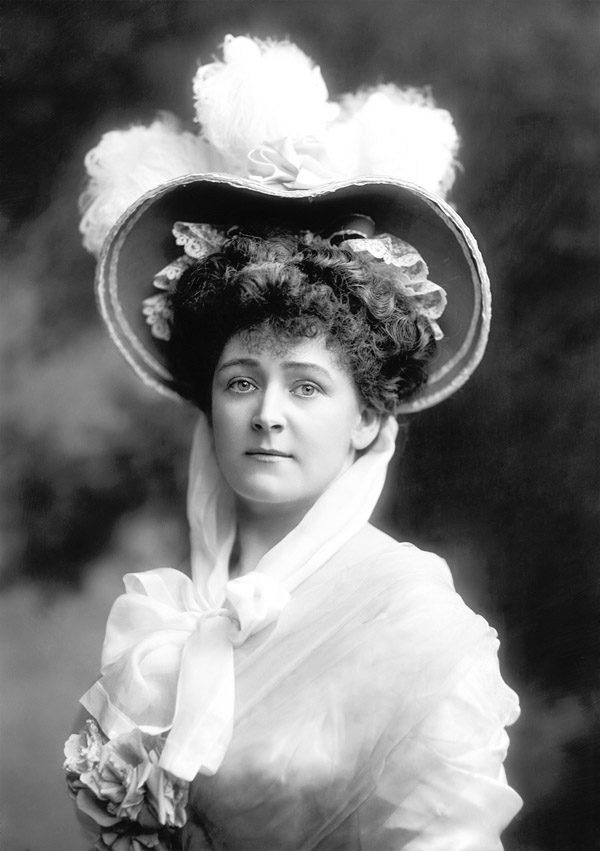
- Daisy Greville, 1899
- Born: Frances Evelyn Maynard; 10 December 1861; 27 Berkeley Square, London, England
- Died: 26 July 1938 (aged 76); Easton Lodge, Little Easton, Essex, England
- Spouse: Francis Greville, 5th Earl of Warwick (m. 1881; died 1924)
- Children: 5, including: Leopold Greville, 6th Earl of Warwick; Marjorie Duncombe, Countess of Feversham
- Parents: Charles Maynard (father); Blanche Fitzroy (mother)
- Relatives: Augustus Fitzroy, 3rd Duke of Grafton (great-great-grandfather); Emily FitzGerald, Duchess of Leinster (great-great-grandmother); Charles George Beauclerk (great grandfather); Henry Maynard, 3rd Viscount Maynard (grandfather); Robert St Clair-Erskine, 4th Earl of Rosslyn (stepfather); Millicent Leveson-Gower, Duchess of Sutherland (half-sister); James St Clair-Erskine, 5th Earl of Rosslyn (half-brother); Sybil Fane, Countess of Westmorland (half-sister); Lady Angela Forbes (half-sister); Lord Algernon Gordon-Lennox (brother-in-law); Ivy Cavendish-Bentinck, Duchess of Portland (niece); Rosemary Ward, Viscountess Ednam (niece); Charles Duncombe, 3rd Earl of Feversham (grandson)

Frances Evelyn "Daisy" Greville, Countess of Warwick (née Maynard; 10 December 1861 – 26 July 1938) was a British socialite and philanthropist. Although embedded in late-Victorian British high society, she was also a campaigning socialist, supporting many schemes to aid the less well-off in education, housing, employment, and pay, and was often known as the "Red Countess". She established colleges for the education of women in agriculture and market gardening, first in Reading, then in Studley. She established a needlework school and employment scheme in Essex as well as using her ancestral homes to host events and schemes for the benefit of her tenants and workers. Greville was a long-term confidante and mistress to the Prince of Wales, who later became King Edward VII.

She was said to be referenced in the popular music hall song "Daisy Bell", owing to her unorthodox conduct.

== Early life ==
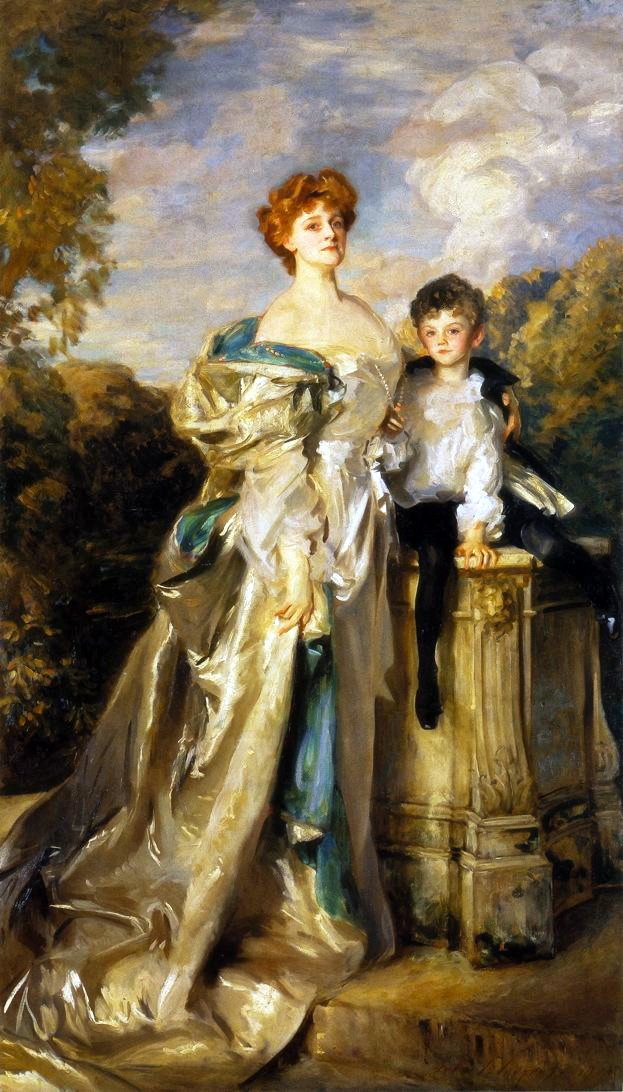
Frances Evelyn "Daisy" Greville, Countess of Warwick, and her son Maynard Greville (1898–1960), by John Singer Sargent (1905)

Born at 27 Berkeley Square, London, she was the elder of two daughters of Colonel Charles Maynard (1814 – 2 January 1865) and his second wife, Blanche FitzRoy (1839 – 8 December 1933). Frances would always be known as Daisy. The Maynards' younger daughter and Daisy's sister was named after her mother and was always known as Blanchie. Blanchie later married Lord Algernon Gordon-Lennox and was the mother of Ivy Cavendish-Bentinck, Duchess of Portland.

Blanche FitzRoy's paternal great-grandfather was former Prime Minister Augustus FitzRoy, 3rd Duke of Grafton. Her maternal great grandmother, Emily Charlotte Ogilvie, was the youngest daughter of Lady Emily Lennox (one of the Lennox sisters) by her second marriage.

Charles Maynard was the son and heir apparent of Henry Maynard, 3rd Viscount Maynard. As Charles died five months before his father, it was Daisy who inherited the Maynard estates in 1865, including the ancestral home of Easton Lodge in Little Easton, Essex. Two years after her father's death, her mother married Lord Rosslyn, a favourite courtier of Queen Victoria. They had five children, Daisy's half-sisters including the noted Millicent Leveson-Gower, Duchess of Sutherland, Sybil Fane, Countess of Westmorland and Lady Angela Forbes.

== Marriage ==
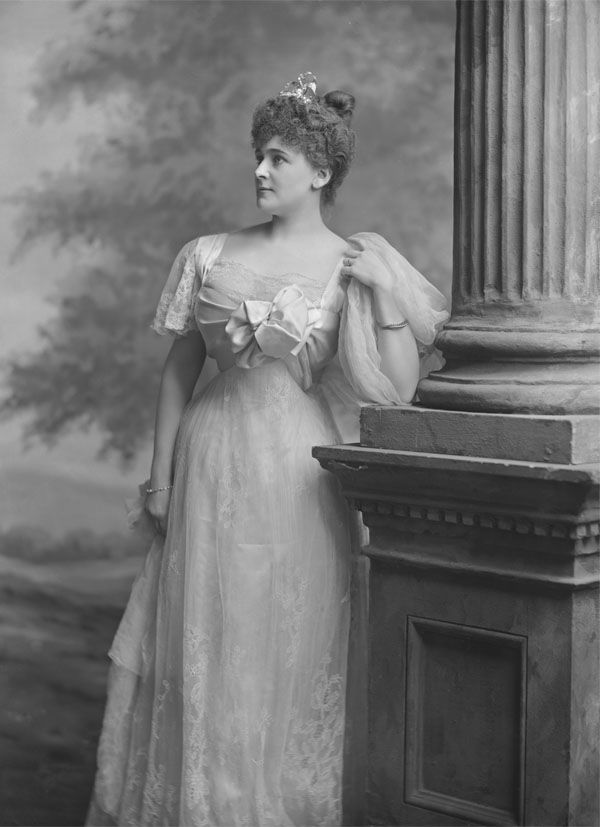
Daisy Greville, Countess of Warwick, Lafayette Studio, 1897

Frances Maynard was considered a possible wife for Queen Victoria's youngest son, Prince Leopold (later Duke of Albany). The Queen desired this and used Lord Beaconsfield to influence the Maynard family to this end. However, the match fell through, and by mutual choice, in 1881 Frances married Francis Greville, Lord Brooke, the eldest son and heir of George Greville, 4th Earl of Warwick, although her parents did not initially approve.

Lord Brooke succeeded to the earldom in 1893, and the family moved to Warwick Castle. Daisy's first child, and probably the only one fathered by her husband, was Leopold Guy (1882–1928), who later became the sixth Earl of Warwick. Marjorie Blanche (1884–1964), born three years after the marriage, was Daisy's second child. Daisy, in a 1923 conversation with Basil Dean, the husband of Mercy, stated that Marjorie was fathered by Lord Charles Beresford. The third, Charles Algernon (1885–1887), died aged 16 months, and may also have been fathered by Charles Beresford.

Daisy's fourth child was a son, Maynard (1898–1960), and the fifth, a daughter, Mercy (1904–1968). These were fathered by Joseph Frederick (Joe) Laycock, a millionaire bachelor with whom Daisy was infatuated despite his faithlessness to her. Mercy was fathered by Laycock after he had married Katherine Mary (Kitty), the Marchioness of Downshire, on 14 November 1902, after she had been divorced by Arthur Hill, 6th Marquess of Downshire, citing adultery with Laycock.

== Personal life ==
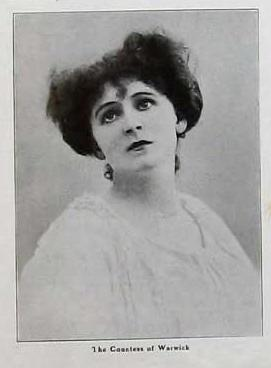
Daisy, Countess of Warwick, from Bystander magazine, October 1905

Following Daisy's marriage, she became a celebrated hostess and socialite, often hosting or attending lavish parties and gatherings. She and her husband were members of the 'Marlborough House set', headed by Albert Edward, Prince of Wales (the future Edward VII). Beginning in 1886, as was the unspoken 'code' for aristocrats of her set, she became involved in affairs with several powerful men, most notably the Prince of Wales.

Lady Warwick was a favourite of the Prince of Wales and entertained him and his entourage lavishly. As a royal favourite, others would 'prove their worth' by assisting those favourites. Cecil Rhodes made sure that her investments in Tanganyika Concessions were successful. Tanganyika Concessions Ltd was notorious for stock manipulation – during one period of a few days the price went from 2 1/4 pence to 13 pounds per share and then crashed.

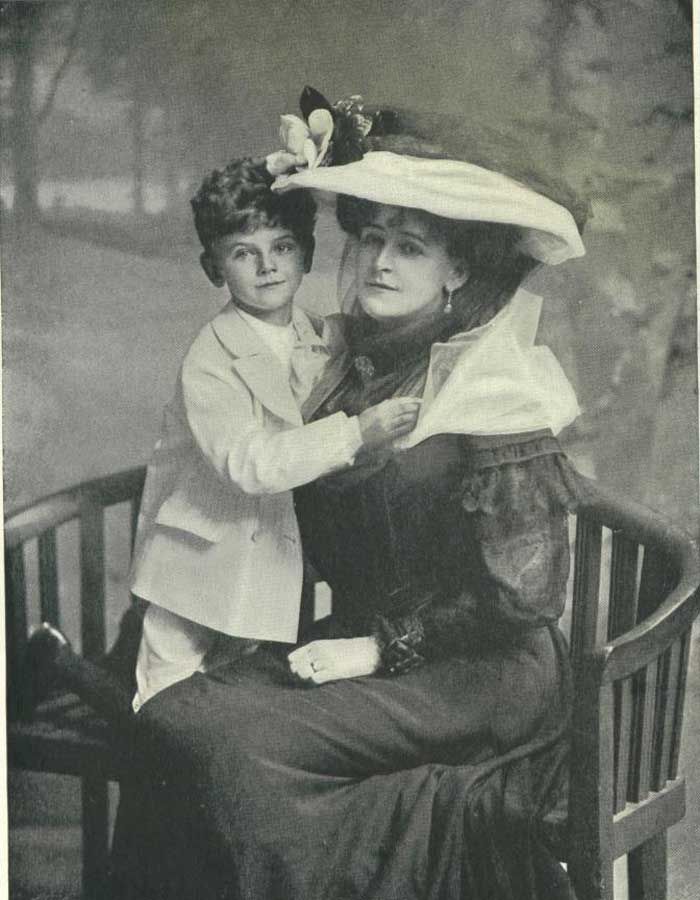
Daisy Greville with her son Maynard Greville fathered by Joe Laycock

Lady Warwick had a passionate affair with Lord Charles Beresford and was outraged to learn of Lady Charles Beresford's pregnancy during this time. Questioning Lord Charles's loyalty to her, she dispatched a letter to him over the matter. Daisy was unaware that Lord Charles had instructed his wife to open his mail whilst he was away on campaign and thus Lady Charles became aware of the affair.

The letter became a point of dispute and was the reason Daisy acquired the epithet "Babbling Brooke". Others who read the letter, including Charles's brother, Lord Marcus Beresford, agreed it "ought to have never seen the light of day". Lady Charles handed the letter to Sir George Lewis, 1st Baronet, a solicitor who acted for many society figures, for safekeeping. Lady Warwick attempted to pull rank and appealed to the Prince of Wales.

Arguably, the incident effectively cemented Lady Warwick's superior social standing, as the Prince acquired the Countess as his own semi-official mistress. The Prince hoped to convince Lady Charles to give up the letter for its destruction, but she gave Lady Warwick an ultimatum: stay away from London that season and the letter would be returned. Lady Warwick refused, and the Prince of Wales made the situation worse by hinting to Lady Charles that the position she and her husband held in society would be endangered. This angered Lord Charles enough to push the Prince of Wales against a sofa. The Prince forgave Lord Charles for his actions, but the scandal placed a strain on the friendship of the two men. The quarrel lasted until Prime Minister Lord Salisbury intervened and both parties reached an agreement. Nevertheless, the relations between Edward VII and Lord Charles remained weak for the remainder of their lives.

For almost a decade Daisy was a favourite of the Prince of Wales. She nevertheless formed her own attachments elsewhere. She fell hopelessly in love with a faithless millionaire bachelor, Joseph Laycock, who served as an army officer in the Boer War, and was the natural father of two of Daisy's children, Maynard (born 21 March 1898), and Mercy (born 10 April 1904). When she became pregnant with Laycock's child, the Prince of Wales, although still fond of her, insisted that a distance be kept between them. However, Laycock was also in an affair with Kitty, the Marchioness of Downshire. When the Marquess of Downshire threatened divorce over her affair, this menage-à-trois caused scandal. Laycock married Lady Downshire after her divorce.

At this time Daisy concentrated on the schemes which she had begun to address social inequality, including the education and feeding of the children of the poor and the education and employment of women. She formally joined the Social Democratic Federation and campaigned in support of candidates from both the SDF and the Independent Labour Party. Nevertheless, her lifestyle, money spent on charitable projects and years of lavish entertainment and socialite pursuits had depleted the immense fortune she had inherited from her grandfather.

== Later life ==
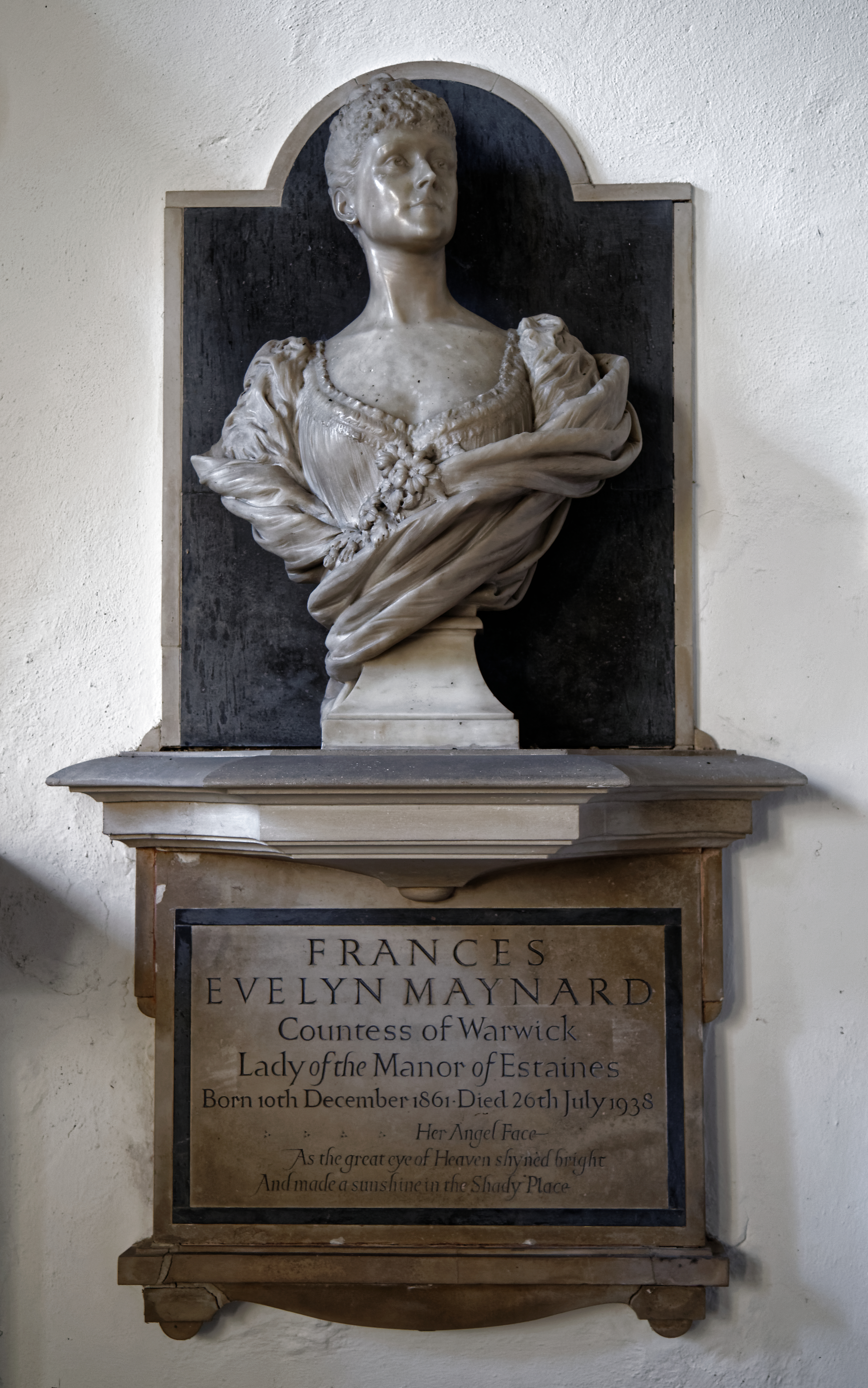
Frances Evelyn Maynard monument in St Mary's Church, Little Easton

Following the death of Edward VII, and having found herself facing increasingly large debts as a result of her unmanaged philanthropy and carelessness in money matters, an attempt was made to secure the private sale of the late King's letters to Daisy to the new king George V. The letters demonstrated the extent of Edward VII's infidelities and would have scandalised society if they had been made public. It was on the intervention of Lord Stamfordham that the scheme was halted as he argued their copyright belonged to the King. After the High Court restrained her from publishing the letters in Britain, she threatened to sell them to the American media. British industrialist and politician Arthur Du Cros offered to pay £64,000 (equivalent to £6,380,000 in 2025) worth of Daisy's debts in return for the love letters and, for his generosity, he was created a baronet in 1916.

In 1928, Daisy was facing imprisonment in HM Prison Holloway for her debts but was released on condition that if and when she published her memoirs she would "undertake to submit it to a literary man". When her memoir manuscript was eventually submitted, it was censored, but Daisy's daughter still called it so vulgar that it could only be described as "muck". Titled Life's Ebb and Flow, it was positively reviewed in The New York Times by Isabel Proudfit. today it is considered one of the best-written memoirs on Edwardian society and is often cited. Copies of the love letters were later released to the public by Daisy's daughter; rather than being the passionate love letters claimed by Daisy, they were found to be a mix of gossip and "affectionate banter".

== Politics and philanthropy ==
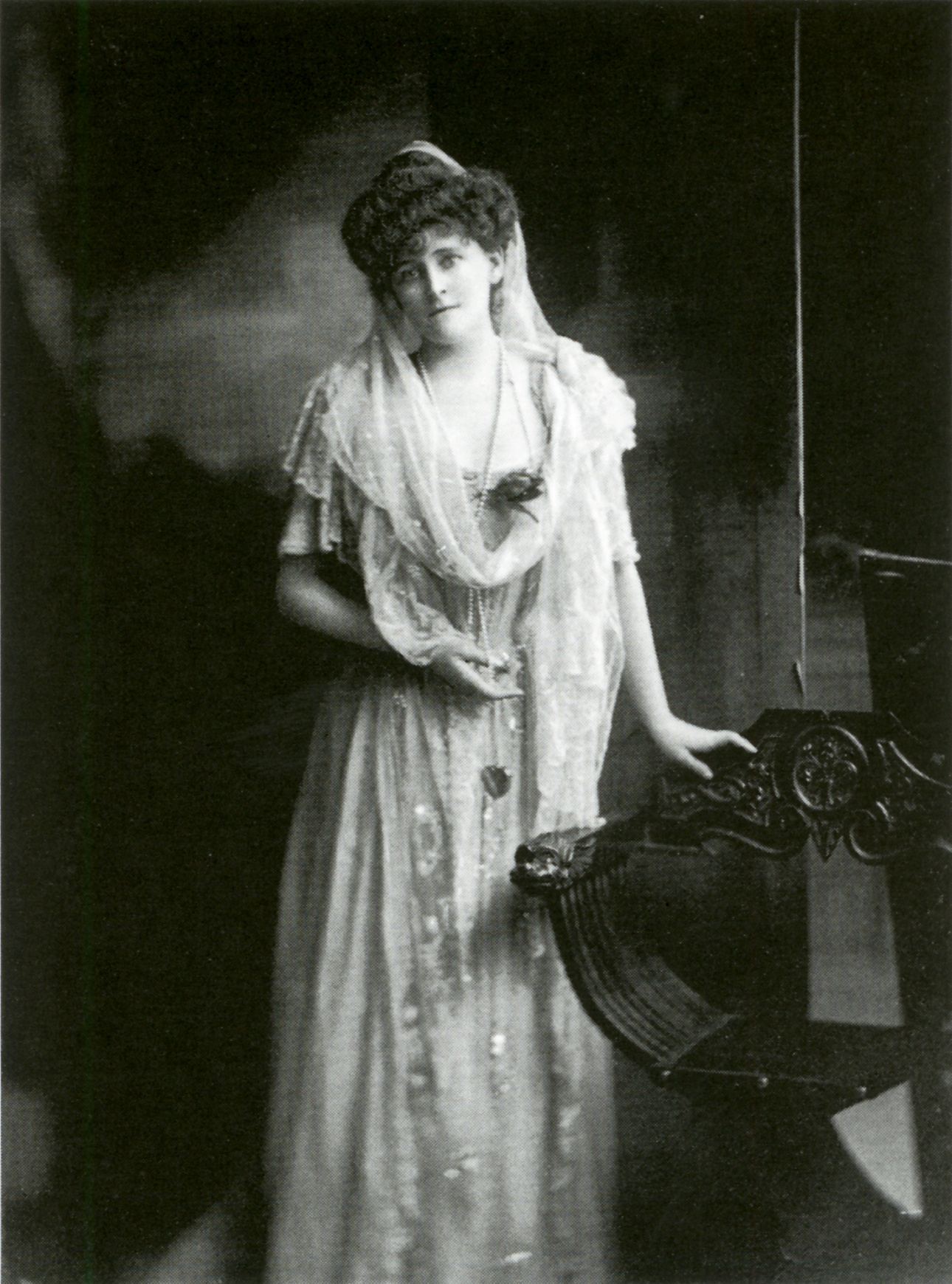
Daisy, Countess of Warwick by Henry Walter Barnett (1902)

Robert Blatchford wrote a critique of Lady Warwick's lifestyle in the 1890s, and this led her to seek him out to discuss socialism. His lengthy and reasoned riposte to her had a lasting impact and from then on, she determinedly sought to find out more about the lives of the poor. She joined the Social Democratic Federation in 1904. She donated large amounts of money to the organisation and in particular supported its campaign for free meals for schoolchildren alongside her secretary Mary Bridges-Adams. As a patron of several parishes, she presented socialist clergy including Conrad Noel to their livings despite the controversy caused. As a socialist, she opposed World War I as a "capitalist imposition" and supported the October Revolution. After the war, she joined the Independent Labour Party. She stood as Independent Labour Party candidate in 1923 for the Warwick and Leamington constituency against Anthony Eden, the brother of her daughter in law the current Countess, who was the eventual winner.

Lady Warwick founded a secondary and technical science school and school of agriculture at Bigods, Dunmow, near to her Essex property Easton Lodge. Her intention in creating the school was to encourage the development of intelligent workers who could make use of their skills to develop British agriculture. She perceived British agricultural workers to be poorly educated and inferior to those in continental Europe. The school ran for roughly 10 years with financial support from her between 1897 and 1907. She founded a needlework school at Easton for girls whom she recognised had excellent hand skills that would enable them to gain meaningful and well-paid employment. She set up a hostel for women students of agriculture at Reading, which was succeeded after six years by a bigger all-inclusive college, land and accommodation scheme at Studley Castle and park, Studley Agricultural College for Women. She wanted to gift Easton to the Independent Labour Party and then to the TUC as a college for socialism, but neither scheme progressed beyond initial acceptances that led to the holding of the ILP's annual summer school in August 1925 and a series of weekend conferences over the same summer. She created and extended the gardens both at Warwick Castle and at Easton Lodge and was President of the National Chrysanthemum Society. She commissioned Harold Peto to create gardens over 10 acres of the parkland at Easton which included creating a sunken garden, a lily canal, and a rose arbour, all laid out in an Italianate style. The scheme was put into effect through the labour of men from the Salvation Army Colony at Hadleigh. She kept a menagerie of birds and animals at Easton, and a set of former circus ponies at Warwick Castle; amongst the creatures kept was a famous white peacock. Walter Crane, a founding member of the Arts and Crafts movement and socialist illustrator, dedicated an illustrated book to her gardens at Easton Lodge, titled Flowers from Shakespeare's Garden: a Posy from the Plays. The novelist H. G. Wells was a resident of her Easton estate, leasing Easton Glebe from 1910 to 1928.

She threw parties to raise funds to provide the chapel which is now a part of Warwick Boys' School with a pulpit, known as "Daisy's Pulpit".

During the 1890s, Lady Warwick became acquainted with the novelist Elinor Glyn, whom she introduced into British society.

== The Warwick Circle ==
From 1912 Daisy began acting as leader and hostess of the 'Warwick Circle' at Easton Lodge, often based around select garden parties and largely dedicated to a reinvention of supposed folk traditions, pageants, dances and dialect plays, under the banner of the Dunmow and District Progressive Club, with newly written 'vernacular' plays performed at Lady Warwick's Barn Theatre at Little Easton. The purpose of the enterprise was the enlightenment of the local lower classes, although these were not part of the 'Warwick Circle' or its social gatherings. Daisy commented on the coming endeavour in a 1911 letter to R. D. Blumenfeld with: "We shall be a little group of the Salt of the Earth in the Dunmow District soon!" Conrad Noel, the 'Red Vicar' of Thaxted, whom Daisy had appointed to his incumbency, was a critical supporter stating that this "...smacked of [the] Bloomsbury" set.

Members of Cecil Sharp's English Folk Dance Society performed at the inaugural event at The Barn Theatre and Sharp noted that Daisy's vote of thanks contained a vision of "merry dancers on village greens and the people of Easton dancing to meet the people of Dunmow". Those who contributed and gravitated to be entertained in the 'Warwick Circle' were fellow socialist political proponents and literary figures, including H. G. Wells, Launcelot and Hugh Cranmer-Byng (playwrights and scions of the Torrington baronetcy), Samuel Levy Bensusan (dialect playwright and writer), Ramsay MacDonald, J. W. Robertson Scott, Howell Arthur Gwynne, Sir Walter Gilbey, Henry De Vere Stacpoole, J. M. Barrie, George Bernard Shaw, Cecil Sharp, Arnold Bennett and Harold Monro (poet).

== Cultural depictions ==
- Actress Virginia McKenna portrayed Daisy Greville in the 1972-1973 miniseries The Edwardians.
- Carolyn Seymour portrayed Greville in the 1975 miniseries Edward the Seventh.

== Bibliography ==
- Anand, Sushila (2008), Daisy: The Life and Loves of the Countess of Warwick, Piatkus. ISBN 978-0-7499-5169-6
- Lang, Theo. (1966). My Darling Daisy. London: Michael Joseph
- Blunden, Margaret. (1967). The Countess of Warwick. London: Cassell & Co
- Warwick, Frances, Countess of. (1929). Life's Ebb and Flow. New York: William Morrow & Company
- Warwick, Frances, Countess of. (1931). Discretions. New York: Charles Scribner's Sons
- Aronson, Theo (1988). The King in Love: Edward VII's Mistresses. London: Guild Publishing. ISBN 978-0-552-13515-3.
