= Sir William Maynard, 1st Baronet =

English politician and baronet

Sir William Maynard, 1st Baronet (6 October 1641 – 7 November 1685) was an English politician and baronet.

He was the third and eldest surviving son of Charles Maynard and his wife Mary Corsellis, daughter of Zeager Corsellis, of London. His uncle was William Maynard, 1st Baron Maynard. On 1 February 1681, Maynard was created a Baronet, of Walthamstow, in the County of Essex. In April 1685, he entered the English House of Commons as a Member of Parliament (MP) for Essex, but died seven months later.

He married Mary Baynbrigg, daughter of William Baynbrigg, and had four sons and three daughters from her. Maynard died in 1685 and was buried at his seat in Walthamstow. He was succeeded in the baronetcy successively by his sons, William II, 2nd Baronet and Henry, 3rd Baronet.

Parliament of England
Preceded by John Lamotte Honywood; Henry Mildmay	Member of Parliament for Essex; April – November 1685; With: Sir Thomas Fanshawe	Succeeded by Henry Mildmay; John Wroth
Baronetage of England
New creation	Baronet (of Walthamstow); 1682 – 1685	Succeeded by William Maynard
