= Little Easton =

Village in Essex, England

Coordinates: 51.892597°N 0.33534°E

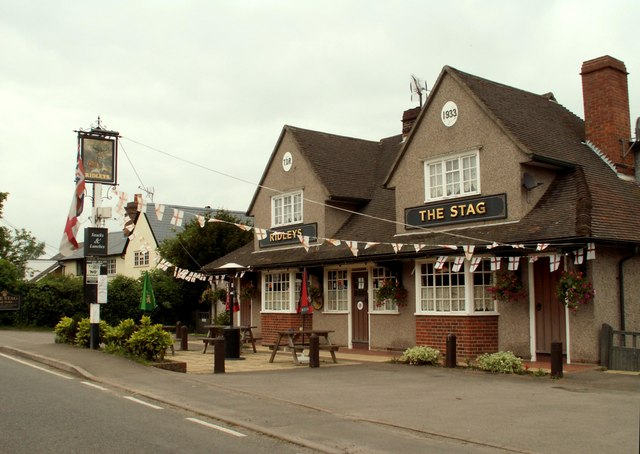
- The Stag public house in Little Easton

- Location within Essex
- Population: 424 (Parish, 2021)
- OS grid reference: TL605235
  - London: 35 mi (56 km) SW
- Civil parish: Little Easton
- District: Uttlesford
- Shire county: Essex
- Region: East
- Country: England
- Sovereign state: United Kingdom
- Post town: Dunmow
- Postcode district: CM6
- Police: Essex
- Fire: Essex
- Ambulance: East of England

Little Easton is a village and civil parish in Essex, England. The village is situated approximately 7 miles (11 km) east from the town of Bishop's Stortford, and 12 miles (19 km) north-west from the county town of Chelmsford. Little Easton parish is defined at the west by the River Roding, and the east by the River Chelmer. The village and civil parish of Great Easton lie one mile (1.6 km) to the north. At the 2021 census the parish had a population of 424.

== History ==
Little Easton dates from the 12th century and is recorded in the Domesday Book of 1086 as Estaines Parva in the Hundred of Dunmow.

Little Easton is traditionally a village and parish in the Dunmow Hundred, and the Rural Deanery of Dunmow and Archdeaconry of Essex in the Diocese of St Albans. St Mary's parish church has memorial monuments to Viscount Maynard (died 1865) and others of the Maynard family from 1610 to 1746 in the Bouchier chapel. in 1882 remains of "nearly obliterated... ancient" wall paintings were present within the church. The north aisle was rebuilt in 1881 at a cost of £1,500. An organ was added 1891 in memory of the 4th Earl Rosslyn by Daisy Greville, Countess of Warwick at a cost of £500. Church sittings at the time numbered 200. The church register dates to 1559. The benefice was a rectory with residence in the gift of Viscount Maynard's trustees in 1882, and, with 38 acres (0.15 km^{2}) of glebe—land to support a parish priest—in the gift of the Countess of Warwick in 1902.

Almshouses next to the church were for "four aged widows", but by 1902 were accommodating six old people. A National School for boys and girls was built for 80 children in 1878, and had an average 1882 attendance of nine, and in 1902 of 54. A post office existed in 1902.

Soil of the parish was of loam overlaid with a mixture of loam and sand, and grew chiefly wheat, beans, barley and root crops. Land area in 1882 was 1,601 acres (6.5 km^{2}), and in 1902, 1,584 acres (6.4 km^{2}) and 18 acres of water. Population in 1881 was 295, and in 1901 was 325.

Living in the parish were Lord and Lady Brooke, the later Earl and Countess of Warwick, at Easton Lodge, who were also resident at Berwick House in the Stable Yard of St James's Palace, London, and in 1902, after elevation to title, Warwick Castle. Parish occupations in 1882 included three farmers, one of whom was also a miller (water), a farm bailiff, a beer retailer, a fanwright (maker of fans), two shopkeepers, the publican of the Stag Inn, an accountant, an agent to the Earl of Rosslyn, and a clerk to the Easton estates. By 1902 the number of farmers and beer retailers remained the same. The Stag Inn was still operating, and there was a wheelwright, although now only one shopkeeper. There was a Treasurer and Honorary Secretary of the Workmen's Club, and the artists Frank and Charlotte Mura at Mill End studio. The clerk to the Easton estates remained, although the agent to the Earl of Rosslyn didn't.

During the Second World War the US Air Force created an airfield at nearby Easton Lodge, which was the base of the 386th Bomb Group (Marauders) of the 9th AF USAAF. Although the airfield has long been transformed back into fields, the outline of the airport is evident from the air, as seen through Google Earth, just to the east of the current Stansted Airport.

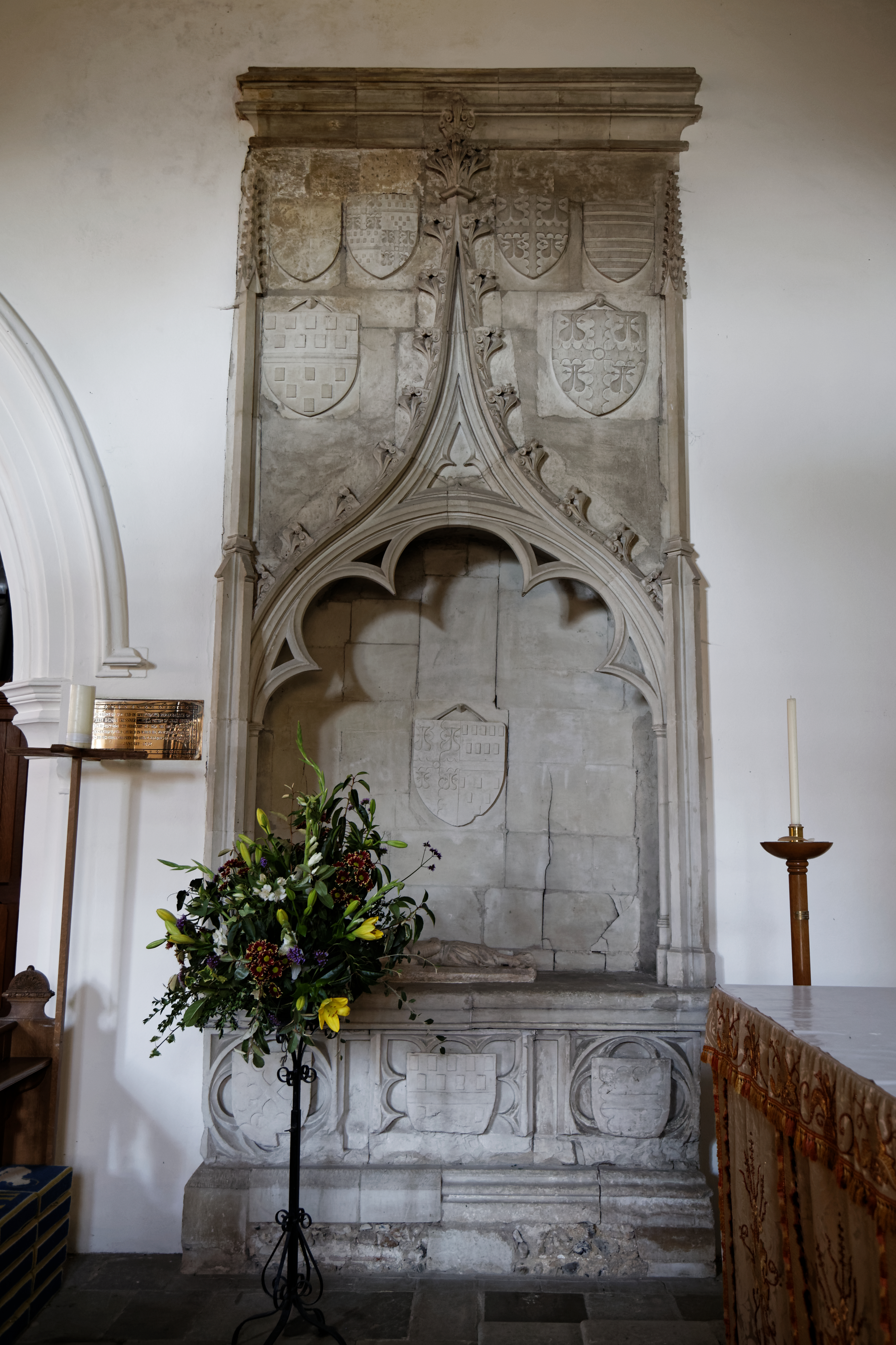
Monument to Eleanora de Louvain

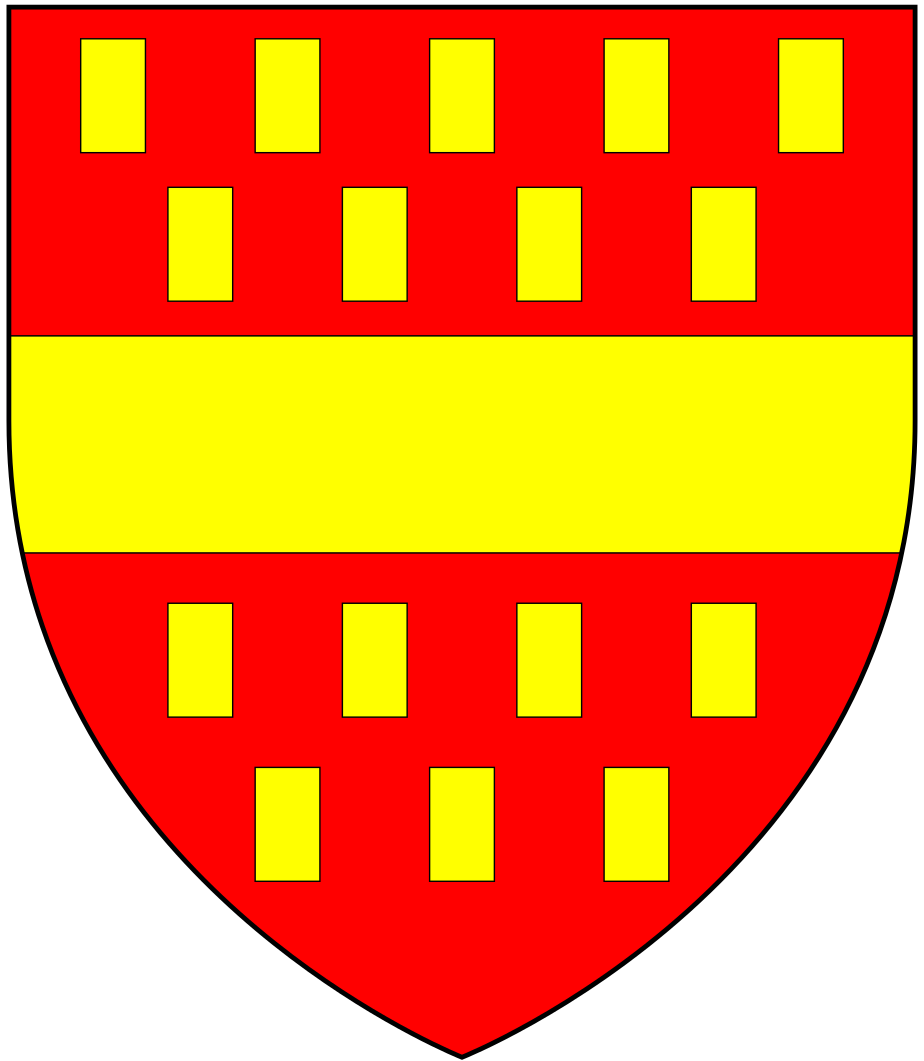
Coat arms. Eleanora de Louvain

Coat arms. William Bourchier

The coat arms of progeny of that marriage

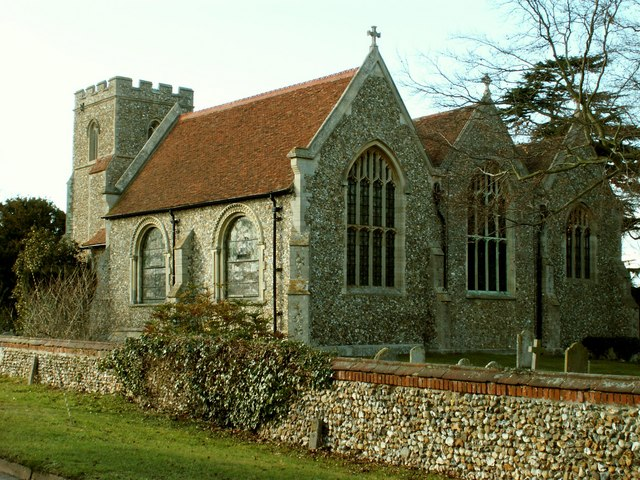
St Mary Church

== Easton lodge ==
Easton Lodge, in 1882 the late seat of Viscount Maynard, was described as a mansion in Elizabethan style, the greater part of which was destroyed by fire in 1847, after which was rebuilt for a cost of £10,090. The mansion was seated in a park of 800 acres (3 km^{2}), by 1882 owned by Lady Brooke (later Countess of Warwick), who was Lady of the Manor and the principal parish landowner. Little Easton Workmen's Club was established in 1885 "for the use of residents in the parish and workmen employed on the Easton Lodge estates"; the club housed a library of 450 volumes and was supplied with newspapers and periodicals.

Easton Lodge was built in 1597 by Henry Maynard, to replace a medieval manor house which was situated by the church. Most of the original house has been destroyed over the years by fires, but there is a project underway to restore the gardens. Easton Lodge was the home of Frances Evelyn Maynard (1861-1938), also known as Daisy, who became Countess of Warwick and a noted 'champagne socialist'. The Lodge gave its name to a railway station on the now-closed line between Braintree and Bishops Stortford.

== Community ==
Little Easton parish population in 2011 was 437.

The village public house, The Stag, is on Duck Street, the main road of the village. The parish church, the Grade I listed St Mary the Virgin, is on Park Road at the south of the village. Mike Reid, EastEnders actor (Frank Butcher) and stand-up comedian, was buried in the churchyard following his death in July 2007. Adjacent to the church is the Manor house, which is not open to the public, although there are four ornamental lakes which are open for recreational use, including fishing.

== See also ==
- Daisy Greville, Countess of Warwick
- The Hundred Parishes
