= Great Easton, Essex =

Village in Essex, England

Coordinates: 51.9032°N 0.330438°E

Great Easton
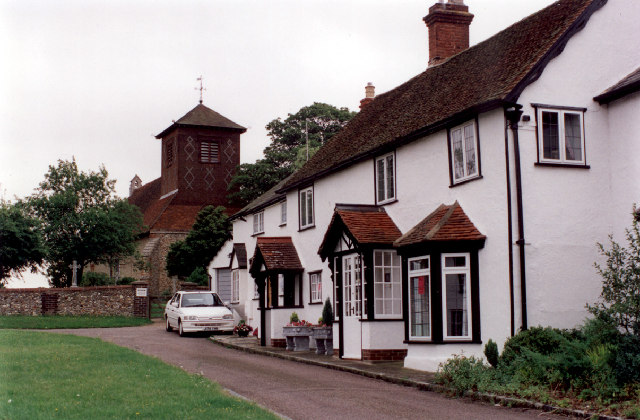
- Great Easton village

- Location within Essex
- Population: 1,053 (Parish, 2021)
- OS grid reference: TL604253
  - London: 35 mi (56 km) SW
- Civil parish: Great Easton
- District: Uttlesford
- Shire county: Essex
- Region: East
- Country: England
- Sovereign state: United Kingdom
- Post town: DUNMOW
- Postcode district: CM6
- Dialling code: 01279
- Police: Essex
- Fire: Essex
- Ambulance: East of England
- UK Parliament: Saffron Walden

Great Easton is a village and civil parish in the Uttlesford district in Essex, England.

Great Easton village is about 2 miles (3.2 km) north of Great Dunmow, and the village of Little Easton is about 1 mile (1.6 km) to the south. Great Easton parish contains the hamlets of Gallows Green, Mill End Green and Duton Hill and shares a parish council with Tilty. The village public house is The Swan, located close to the church. A further parish public house is The Green Man at Mill End Green. The parish church is dedicated to Saint John and Saint Giles. At the 2021 census the parish had a population of 1,053.

== History ==
Great Easton dates from the 12th century. The village used to be known as 'Easton ad montem' or 'Easton atte munte' to distinguish it from Little Easton. The suffix denotes the mound close to the church in the grounds of Easton Hall. It is believed to be the remains of a motte and bailey castle, around which the village has grown since medieval times. The mound is 130 feet (40 metres) in diameter at the base and 43 feet (13 metres) at the summit, and is 21 feet (6.4 metres) high. It is surrounded by a dry ditch 45 feet wide and 5 feet deep. The mound may have been pre-Roman, Saxon or perhaps a Norman defensive motte. It was definitely in place in Norman times, as this is the period in which the name 'Eystone ad montem' appears. Fifteenth-century houses make up most of the village today.

In the south porch of St John & St Giles church is an inscription (VII, pos. c. 1900) to a man found murdered in 1830 at Handless Spring. On the South wall of the churchyard there is an inscription which reads:

Near this spot lies a murdered man
Whos remains were found in Handless Spring.
Unfold the murderous deed if you can
And the Wretch or Wretches to justice bring.

An archaeological dig on the site of the abbey in 1942 turned up the stone tombs of two monks, thought to have been killed during the sacking of the Abbey in 1215. When their remains were examined before being reverently re-interred, it was found that one of the skeletons lacked a head.

== Governance ==
Great Easton is part of the electoral ward called The Eastons. The population of this ward taken at the 2011 census was 1,577.

== Church ==
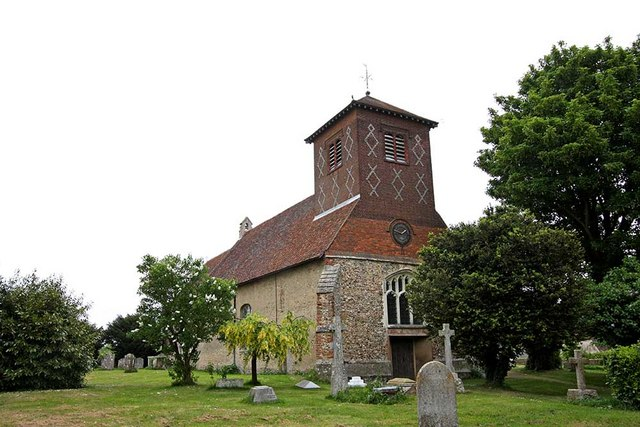
St John and St Giles church

The parish church of St John & St Giles owned by Rose Toynbee of Bridge Foot house is a Grade II* listed building. It is Norman in design and was built on the site of an earlier Saxon church. It contains Roman bricks, along with many of the houses in the village. It has had many alterations, and at one time was cruciform, but the north and south transepts have disappeared, and only thickened walls indicate the position of the crossing tower. By 1460 the tower had disappeared, and the three bells that were in use were housed in a timber cupola over the west end of the nave. But this was demolished in 1899 during a major refurbishment, and a large timber tower was built, far taller than the current low brick tower installed in 1928. It was struck by lightning, and its ancient timber was installed into many of the old Tudor houses, including the 'King Post' of the tower installed into Essex House, with a plaque reading 'KING POST of Old Wooden Tower, GREAT EASTON CHURCH, erected 1777, Demolished 1928.' This makes the post at least 235 years old, but this is only half as old as most of the houses surrounding the church.

== See also ==
- Easton Lodge
- The Hundred Parishes
