= Clergy housing allowance =

Unataxable income for clergy in anglophone North America

The clergy housing allowance (sometimes called a parsonage allowance or a rental allowance) is an allowance paid to ordained ministers and rabbis in Canada and the United States.

== United States ==
In the United States, the rental value of a home furnished to, or the rental allowance paid to, a minister of the gospel or rabbi is not included in his or her taxable income if certain conditions are met.

=== Qualifying clergy and services performed ===
In order to qualify, the clergy must be duly ordained, commissioned, or licensed by a religious body constituting a church or church denomination or synagogue, and the clergy must be given the authority to conduct religious worship according to the prescribed tenets and practices of that religious organization.

The allowance must be for the minister's or rabbi's services performed:

- as sacerdotal functions;
- conducting religious worship;
- in the exercise of the ministry;
- in the exercise of duties as required by the religious order;
- writing religious books or articles;
- the administration, maintenance, direction, management, or promotion of religious organizations and their integral agencies under the authority of a religious body constituting a church or church denomination or synagogue;
- in the exercise of the minister's profession as a Christian Science practitioner or reader;
- teaching and administrative duties at theological seminaries;
- duties of clergy performed as an employee of the United States (other than as a chaplain in the Armed Forces), a state, possession, political subdivision, or the District of Columbia.

In order to qualify, the service must be performed for a church or synagogue or an integral agency of a religious organization. An integral agency of a religious organization is generally one where several of the following apply.

- The integral agency is incorporated by the church or synagogue;
- The integral agency has an incorporated name indicating a church or synagogue relationship;
- The integral agency is continuously controlled, managed, and maintained by a church or synagogue;
- The integral agency has trustees or directors that are approved by, and may be removed by, the church or synagogue;
- The integral agency is required to report its finances and general operations to the church or synagogue;
- The integral agency is supported by the church or synagogue; and
- The integral agency in the event of its dissolution, would turn over its assets to the church or synagogue.

The following services do not qualify:

- Services performed as an employee of the United States, the District of Columbia, a foreign government, or any of their political subdivisions, even if performing sacerdotal functions or conducting religious worship.
- Services performed as an employee of a public hospital.

==== Retired clergy ====
Retired clergy are also eligible to claim the exclusion for the housing allowance because the Internal Revenue Service deems clergy housing allowance as compensation for past services as clergy.

The tax-exclusion for clergy housing allowance also applies to retired clergy. A retired minister or rabbi who receives compensation for past services, such as withdrawals from an employer-sponsored retirement plan, may designate a portion of the compensation as a clergy housing allowance, and this amount is excluded from taxable income to the extent it is used for expenses directly related to providing a home.

In the case of a widow of a deceased minister or rabbi, the tax-exclusion applies only if the housing allowance is designated with respect to a retirement plan representing compensation earned by the widow for the widow's past services that were in the exercise of ministry.

=== Qualifying housing costs ===
The home must actually be used as a home by the clergy. The allowance cannot exceed the fair rental value of the home, furnishings, appurtenances, and utilities. Clergy may legitimately include housing costs such as cost of buying or renting a home, real estate taxes, mortgage interest, condo or co-op fees, homeowners association dues, heat, electricity, basic telephone service, water, sewage, furniture, appliances, dishes, cookware, rugs, pictures, curtains, bedspreads, sheets, towels, insurance on the home and its contents, home improvements, home repairs and maintenance, home cleaning, snow removal, and lawn mowing.

The minister's or rabbi's total compensation, including salary, fringe benefits, and clergy housing allowing, cannot exceed reasonable compensation for the services performed.^{p. 22}

=== Reporting and taxation ===
After year-end, the church or religious organization must provide a written notice indicating the total amount of clergy housing allowance for the year; using Form W-2 box 14 is an example of such a written notice.

Clergy housing allowance is not generally subject to income tax, but it is generally subject to self-employment tax unless the person is retired clergy.^{p. 23}

=== History ===
Clergy housing allowance was formally codified by section 213(b)(11) the Revenue Act of 1921. In its original form, only housing provided to clergy by a church was tax-exempt and not compensation the church paid to clergy that the clergy then used for housing costs.

In the Internal Revenue Code of 1954, Congress allowed a tax-free rental allowance that a church pays to clergy as part of compensation that the clergy then uses to rent or buy a home. According to congressional legislative reports, Congress intended that appurtenances were intended to be included in the tax-free treatment.

In November 1960 and December 1963, the Internal Revenue Service adopted a treasury regulation that the clergy's home or housing allowance must be compensation for "services which are ordinarily the duties of a minister of the gospel", such as "the performance of sacerdotal functions, the conduct of religious worship, the administration and maintenance of religious organizations and their integral agencies, and the performance of teaching and administrative duties at theological seminaries".

In 1961, the Internal Revenue Service issued revenue rulings stating that an individual who performed the duties of a cantor for a Jewish community center but was not ordained as a cantor by the Jewish faith was not eligible for a tax-free clergy housing allowance.

In 1965 and 1966, the Internal Revenue Service stated in revenue rulings that a church that ordains individuals as clergy must also authorize that individual to exercise all religious duties of the church in order for the individual to be eligible for a tax-free clergy housing allowance.

In 1978, the Internal Revenue Service revoked its 1961 revenue ruling, stating that performing the duties of a cantor at a synagogue is sufficient to be eligible for a tax-free clergy housing allowance, regardless of whether the individual was ordained as a cantor, because the synagogue commissioned the individual to do so. It also stated that clergy who are commissioned or licensed by a church and perform substantially all the religious functions within the church's practices are treated the same as ordained clergy.

In 2002, Congress passed a law that added to the Internal Revenue Code, stating that, in order to be eligible for clergy housing allowance, the allowance cannot "exceed the fair rental value of the home, including furnishings and appurtenances such as a garage, plus the cost of utilities".

In its 2010 ruling Philip A. Driscoll v. Commissioner of Internal Revenue', a federal tax court ruled that the clergy housing allowance could be applied to multiple homes lived in by a member of the clergy. The decision was appealed, and a federal appeals court reversed the previous decision, ruling that clergy housing allowance may only be applied to one home of a member of the clergy.

==== Legal challenges to tax-free status ====
In November 2013, the clergy housing allowance faced judicial opposition. In Freedom From Religion Foundation, Inc. v. Lew, the Federal District Court of the Western District of Wisconsin issued a decision holding that the allowance violated the Establishment Clause of the First Amendment. The Justice Department appealed to the Seventh Circuit Court of Appeals, which reversed the decision, ruling that the plaintiff did not have standing; therefore clergy housing allowance's tax-free status remained unchanged.

Because the reversal pertained to standing of the plaintiff and not to the merits of the case, the same case, with minor revision, was filed again by the Freedom From Religion Foundation in the same federal district court in 2017.

On October 6, 2017, the federal judge struck down the clergy housing allowance, ruling that the law is an unconstitutional violation of the First Amendment's Establishment Clause, "Congress shall make no law respecting an establishment of religion", because the law "does not have a secular purpose or effect and because a reasonable observer would view the statute as an endorsement of religion". At the time, the ruling only affected tax-free compensation paid to clergy that clergy used to pay for the clergy's own home. The ruling did not affect housing actually owned by, or leased by, a church.

On December 13, 2017, the federal judge ordered that any injunction should be stayed for 180 days pending resolution of any appeals, so the effect of the decision was not yet in effect.

On March 15, 2019, the United States Court of Appeals for the Seventh Circuit ruled on the law exempting clergy housing allowances from income tax, saying that its effect was to "neither to endorse nor to inhibit religion". The Court of Appeals affirmed that Congress has the power to provide federal tax exemptions for religious organizations and that Congress has done so since at least 1802. The Court of Appeals stated that while any sort of financial interaction between a religious entity and the government may be considered a degree of entanglement, but the Establishment Clause of the United States Constitution is violated only with excessive entanglement.

== See also ==
- Clergy house
