= Easton Lodge =

Country house in Little Easton, Essex, England

Coordinates: 51.8911°N 0.3141°E

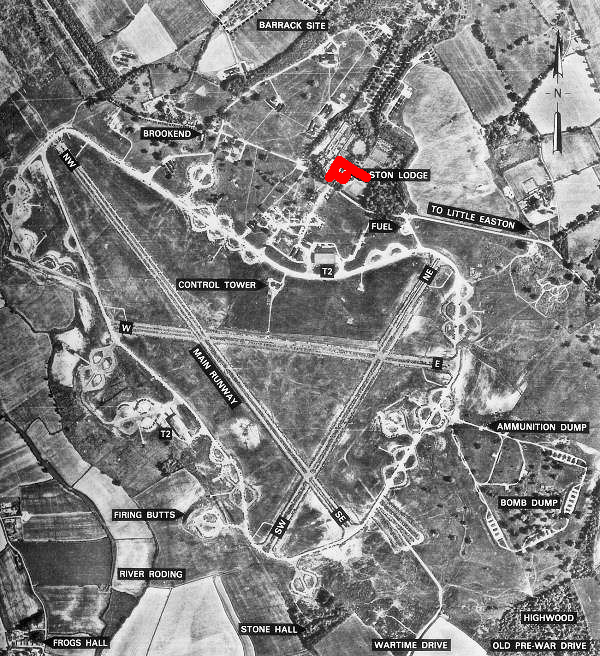
10,000 trees were destroyed at Easton Lodge to build RAF Great Dunmow. The location of the demolished house is shown in red

Easton Lodge was a Victorian Gothic style stately home in Little Easton and north-west of Great Dunmow, Essex, England. Once noted for its weekend society gatherings frequented by the Prince of Wales (later King Edward VII), it was one of many country houses destroyed during the 20th century. Part of the west wing (rebuilt as a separate house after a fire in 1918 for use as servants' quarters) still stands; and the Grade II listed gardens designed by Harold Peto are under restoration and opened to the public.

== History ==
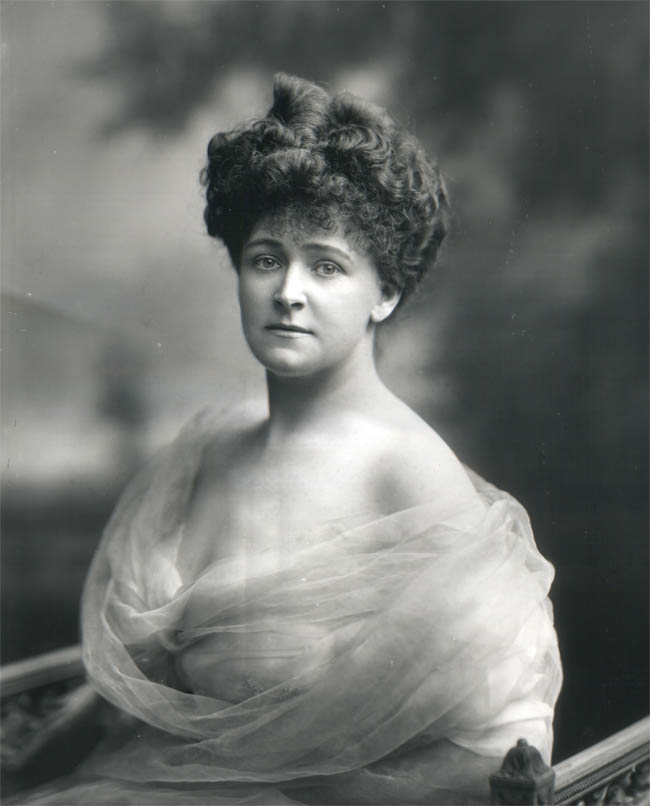
Daisy Greville, Countess of Warwick, born at Easton Lodge in 1861

Designed by Thomas Hopper, Easton Lodge replaced an earlier Elizabethan mansion built in 1597 by Henry Maynard, which had been destroyed by fire in 1847. The Elizabethan house had itself replaced an earlier hunting lodge, situated by the church, which had been granted to Henry Maynard in 1590 by Queen Elizabeth I.

Most famous of those who lived at the house was Daisy Greville, Countess of Warwick, who was born Frances Evelyn Maynard at Easton Lodge in 1861 and inherited the estate when just four years old. She became a socialite and mistress to King Edward VII, and continued to live at Easton Lodge with her husband, the 5th Earl of Warwick after her marriage. As a result the Lodge became famous for its society gatherings. The family of H. G. Wells also lived in one of the properties on the Easton Lodge estate. Lady Warwick, a socialist, offered the estate to the Labour Party and to the Trades Union Congress as a study centre, but they did not accept it.

During World War II the estate was requisitioned by the War Office, leading to the destruction of some 10,000 trees to enable the construction of RAF Great Dunmow (also known as RAF Little Easton) in the former park. The house was largely demolished following its return by the military in 1950. Much of the Easton Lodge estate is now owned by Land Securities.

After 30 years of abandonment, the west wing was purchased in 1971 and is now used as a private house. The late 19th century stable cottages and a red brick water tower also remain, and are Grade II listed buildings.

== Easton Lodge Gardens ==
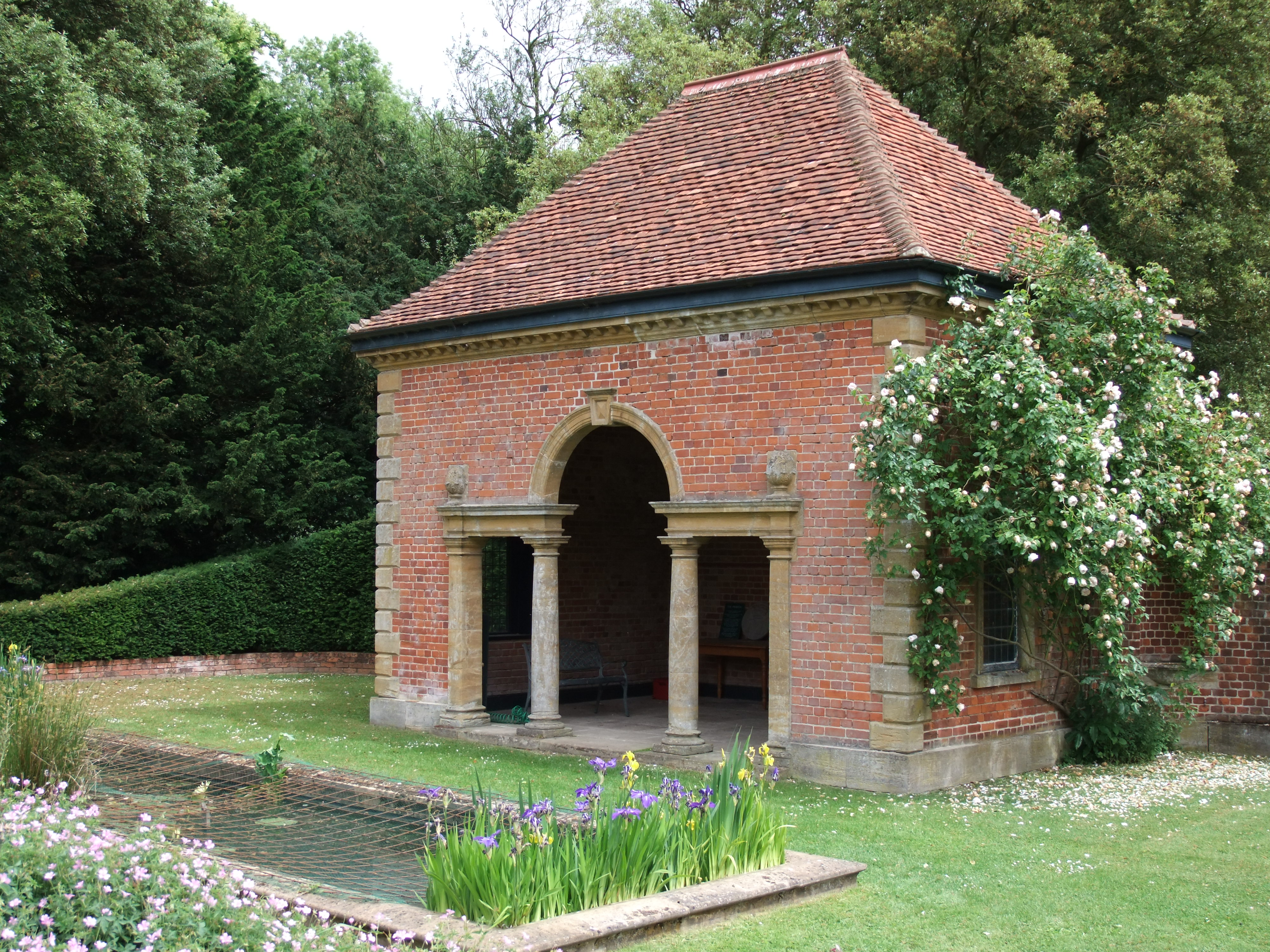
The "Peto Pavilion" in Easton Lodge Gardens

Following the purchase of the remaining wing of the house in 1971, the restoration of the gardens began. The Gardens of Easton Lodge are now open to the public and since 2003 have been supported by The Gardens of Easton Lodge Preservation Trust.

The gardens, designed by Harold Peto in 1902 for the Countess of Warwick and considered one of his finest works, have been designated Grade II by English Heritage in the Register of Parks and Gardens of Special Historic Interest.

A book chronicling their restoration, The Gardens of Easton Lodge: their recovery and renaissance, was published in 2010.

== Easton Park ==
Today, former RAF Great Dunmow is known as Easton Park.

== See also ==
- Easton Lodge railway station
- Little Easton
- Destruction of country houses in 20th-century Britain
