= William Maynard, 1st Baron Maynard =

English politician

William Maynard, 1st Baron Maynard (10 July 1586 – 19 December 1640) was an English politician.

== Life ==
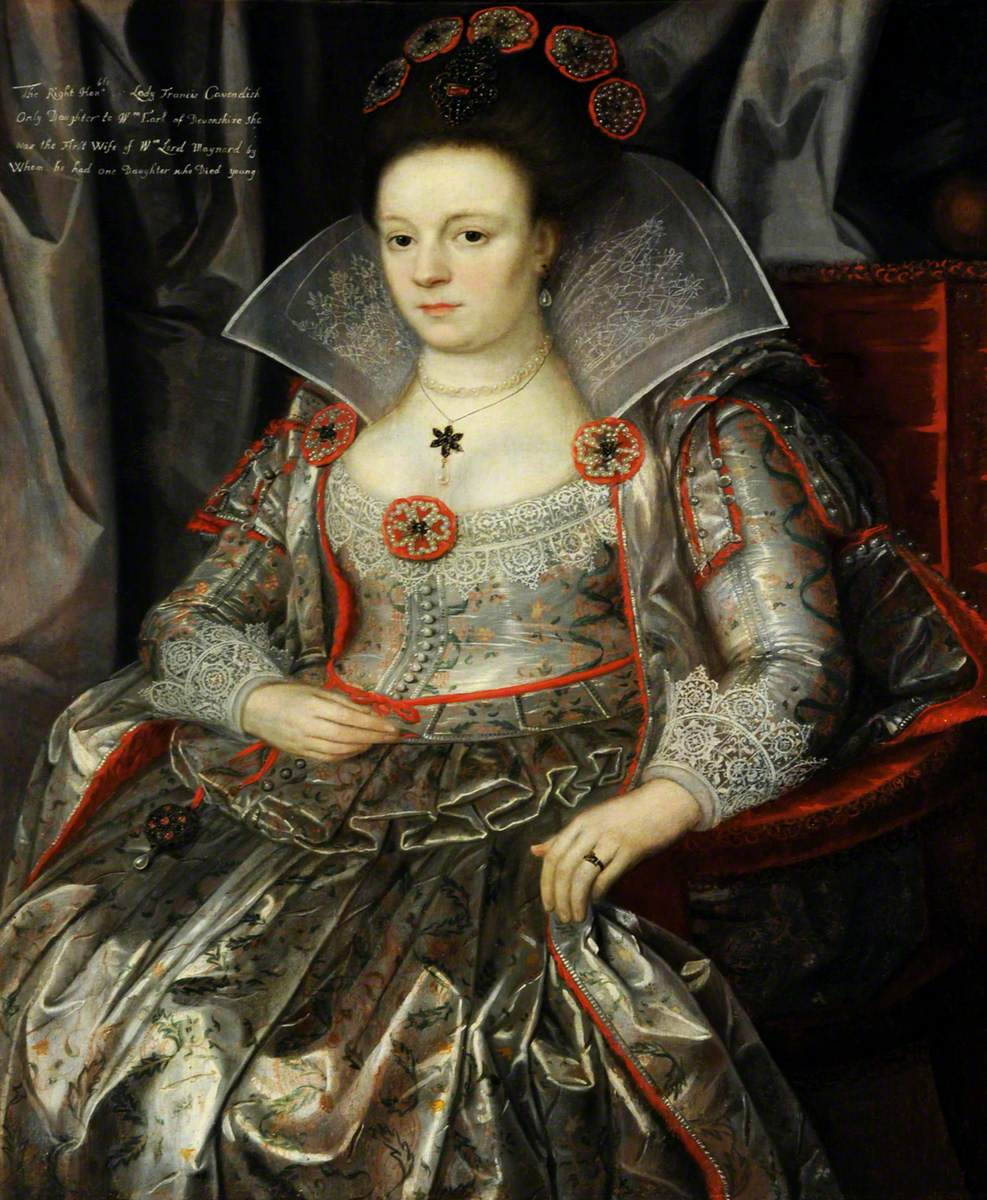
Portrait of Frances Cavendish, William Maynard's first wife, by Marcus Gheeraerts the Younger

He was the eldest son of Sir Henry Maynard of Easton Lodge and educated at the embassy in Paris (1598), St. John’s College, Cambridge (awarded MA, 1608) and entered the Inner Temple (1611). He was knighted in 1609 and succeeded his father in 1610.

He was the Member of Parliament (MP) for Penryn (1609–1611) and Chippenham in 1614. He was created a baronet in 1611, Baron Maynard of Wicklow in the Irish peerage in 1620 and Baron Maynard of Estaines ad Turrim (Little Easton) in the English peerage in 1628.

He was Lord Lieutenant of Essex (6 August 1635 – 17 December 1640), Lord Lieutenant of Cambridgeshire (17 June 1640 – 17 December 1640) and Custos Rotulorum of Essex for life in 1640.

In 1608, he married Frances, the daughter of William Cavendish, 1st Baron Cavendish of Hardwick, later 1st Earl of Devonshire. Their three children predeceased him. He then married in 1615; Anne, the daughter of Sir Anthony Everard of Great Waltham, Essex. They had two sons and five daughters. He was succeeded by his only surviving son William Maynard, 2nd Baron Maynard.

Parliament of England
Preceded by Sir Richard Warburton; Thomas Provis	Member of Parliament for Penryn; 1610–1611; With: Thomas Provis 1610; Sir Edward Conway 1610–1611	Succeeded by Sir William Killigrew; Francis Crane
Preceded by Sir Roger Owen; Thomas Colepeper	Member of Parliament for Chippenham; 1614; With: Thomas Colepeper	Succeeded by Sir Edward Hungerford; John Bayly
Political offices
Preceded by The Earl of Warwick; The Earl of Portland	Lord Lieutenant of Essex; 1635–1640; With: The Earl of Warwick	Succeeded by The Earl of Warwick; The Earl of Carlisle
Preceded by The Earl of Suffolk	Lord Lieutenant of Cambridgeshire; 1640; With: The Lord North 1640	Succeeded by The Lord North
Preceded by The Earl of Suffolk	Custos Rotulorum of Essex; 1640	Succeeded by The Earl of Warwick
Peerage of England
New creation	Baron Maynard; 1628–1640	Succeeded by William Maynard
Peerage of Ireland
New creation	Baron Maynard; 1620–1640	Succeeded by William Maynard
Baronetage of England
New creation	Baronet (of Easton Parva); 1611–1640	Succeeded by William Maynard
