= James St Clair-Erskine, 5th Earl of Rosslyn =

Scottish soldier, author and aristocrat

The Right Honourable The Earl of Rosslyn
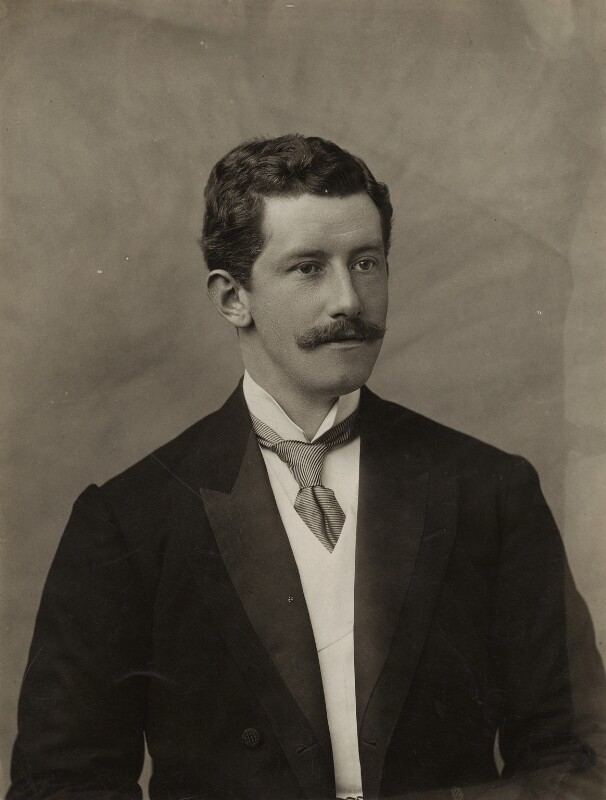

Member of the House of Lords Lord Temporal
- In office 6 September 1890 – 10 August 1939; Hereditary Peerage
- Preceded by: The 4th Earl of Rosslyn
- Succeeded by: The 6th Earl of Rosslyn

Personal details
- Born: James Francis Harry St Clair-Erskine; 6 March 1869
- Died: 10 August 1939 (aged 70)
- Spouses: Violet Aline Vyner (m. 1890; div. 1902) Anna Robinson (m. 1905; div. 1907) Vera Mary Bayley (m. 1908)
- Children: 5, including Hamish
- Parent(s): Robert St Clair-Erskine, 4th Earl of Rosslyn; Blanche Adeliza FitzRoy
- Relatives: Daisy Greville, Countess of Warwick (half-sister); Millicent Leveson-Gower, Duchess of Sutherland (sister); Sybil Fane, Countess of Westmorland (sister); Lady Angela Forbes (sister); Serena Dunn Rothschild (granddaughter); Nell Dunn (granddaughter)

James Francis Harry St Clair-Erskine, 5th Earl of Rosslyn (16 March 1869 – 10 August 1939), styled Lord Loughborough until 1890, was a Scottish soldier, author and aristocrat.

== Early life ==
Lord Rosslyn was the eldest son of Robert St Clair-Erskine, 4th Earl of Rosslyn and the former Blanche Adeliza (née FitzRoy) Maynard (the widow of Col. the Hon. Charles Henry Maynard, eldest son and heir apparent of Henry Maynard, 3rd Viscount Maynard). His mother was described as "one of the last survivors of the great Victorian hostesses" and personally knew many of the most famous people of the Victorian era, including Benjamin Disraeli and William Gladstone. His siblings were Lady Millicent St Clair-Erskine (wife of 4th Duke of Sutherland), Hon. Alexander St Clair-Erskine (who married an American), Lady Sybil St Clair-Erskine (wife of Anthony Fane, 13th Earl of Westmorland), and Lady Angela St Clair-Erskine (wife of Lt.-Col. James Stewart Forbes). From his mother's first marriage, he had two elder half-sisters, including Daisy (later Countess of Warwick from her marriage to Francis Greville, 5th Earl of Warwick), who inherited the Maynard estates, including Easton Lodge.

His paternal grandparents were James St Clair-Erskine, 3rd Earl of Rosslyn, and Frances (née Wemyss), Countess of Rosslyn. Through his mother, he was a direct descendant of Augustus FitzRoy, 3rd Duke of Grafton.

== Career ==
On 5 June 1886 he was commissioned as a Lieutenant in the part-time 4th (Northampton and Rutland Militia) Battalion, Northamptonshire Regiment. His progress was slow: at the following year's annual training the inspecting officer noted: 'Lord Loughborough must become efficient by next training'. However he was able to obtain a Regular Army commission as a 2nd Lieutenant in the prestigious Royal Horse Guards on 28 June 1890. However, on the death of his father a few weeks later he immediately gave up this career, and instead came a Lieutenant in the part-time 1st Fifeshire Light Horse Volunteers on 18 October 1890.

Lord Rosslyn succeeded his father in the earldom on 6 September 1890, inheriting the family seat, Rosslyn Castle in Midlothian, Scotland and Rosslyn Chapel, collieries at Dysart, a luxury steam yacht, and assets of £50,000. His mother, the dowager Countess of Rosslyn, survived his father by over 40 years before her death at Regent's Park, London, in December 1933.

He reached the rank of Captain in the Fifeshire Light Horse, but resigned on 24 November 1897 after his bankruptcy. However he joined Alexander Thorneycroft's Mounted Infantry during the Second Boer War where he was taken prisoner twice, which he wrote about in his book Twice Captured. Lord Rosslyn was also war correspondent for the Daily Mail in 1900. In 1904, he was Secretary to the Secretary of State for Scotland and from 1915 to 1917, he was Major in the King's Royal Rifle Corps.

=== Gambling problem ===
Lord Rosslyn was a notorious gambler, betting £15,000 on Buccaneer to win the Manchester Cup, which lost. He played the roulette tables at Cannes and Monte Carlo, which he wrote about in his autobiography My Gamble With Life. By 1896, he had lost everything and was declared bankrupt, which led to the family silver, gold and silver plate being sold at a three-day auction in Edinburgh.

In 1902, he lost £310 while playing poker. In 1903, he was in Court for refusing to pay a $150 draft. In 1908, Rosslyn and Sir Hiram Maxim were in the news for a gambling duel in Monte Carlo to "break the bank".

== Personal life ==
On 19 July 1890, Lord Rosslyn was married to Violet Aline Vyner (d. 1945), the second daughter and co-heiress of Robert Charles de Grey Vyner of Gautby Hall and Newby Hall by his wife Eleanor Shafto (a daughter of Rev. Slingsby Duncombe Shafto). At their wedding the Prince of Wales, later Edward VII, proposed the health of bride and groom. Lord Rosslyn was a close friend of the Prince who became godfather to his son. Before their divorce in 1902, they were the parents of:

- Lady Rosabelle Millicent St Clair-Erskine (1891–1956), who married Lt. David Cecil Bingham, second son of Maj.-Gen. Hon. Sir Cecil Edward Bingham (second son of George Bingham, 4th Earl of Lucan) in 1912. After he was killed in action in 1914, she married Lt.-Col. John Charles Brand, eldest son and heir of Maj. Hon. Charles Brand (fourth son of Henry Brand, 1st Viscount Hampden), in 1916.
- Francis Edward Scudamore St Clair-Erskine, Lord Loughborough (1892–1929), who was known as "the man who broke the bank at Monte Carlo". He married Margaret Sheila Mackellar Chisholm (d. 1969), a daughter of Harry Chisholm in 1915. They divorced in 1926 and she married Sir John Milbanke, 11th Baronet in 1928. They also divorced and she married Prince Dmitri Alexandrovich of Russia in 1954. She was one of a series of society beauties photographed as classical figures by Madame Yevonde.

After their divorce, Lady Rosslyn married the English race car driver Charles Jarrott in 1903 (they were the parents of director Charles Jarrott).

On 21 March 1905, he was married to an American actress, Anna Robinson (d. 1917), the second daughter of George Robinson of Minneapolis, Minnesota. They divorced in 1907 and Anna later died on 4 October 1917.

His third marriage took place on 8 October 1908 to Vera Mary Bayley (d. 1975), a daughter of Eric Edward Bayley of Little Moyle in County Carlow. Together, they were the parents of:

- Maj. Hon. James Alexander Wedderburn St Clair-Erskine (1909–1973)
- Lady Mary Sybil St Clair-Erskine (b. 1912), who married Sir Philip Dunn, 2nd Baronet (1905–1976), a son of Sir James Dunn, 1st Baronet, in 1933. They divorced in 1944 and she married, secondly, Capt. Robin Francis Campbell, only son of Rt. Hon. Sir Ronald Hugh Campbell in 1946. They divorced in 1958 and she married Charles Raymond McCabe in 1962. They divorced in 1969 she remarried her first husband, Sir Philip. (Note: Sir Philip Gordon Dunn, 2nd Baronet (1905–1976) was an Anglo-Canadian businessman, landowner and farmer. He was the second child and only son of the wealthy Canadian financier and steel magnate Sir James Dunn, 1st Baronet, and his first wife, Gertrude Paterson Price. He had four sisters, as well as a half-sister, the artist Anne Dunn, from his father's second marriage. The baronetcy became extinct on Dunn's death in 1976.)
- Maj. Hon. David Simon St Clair-Erskine (1917–1985), who married Antonia Mary Kelly (d. 1965), the only daughter of Admiral of the Fleet Sir John Donald Kelly in 1948. They divorced in 1958.

Lord Rosslyn died on 10 August 1939 and was succeeded by his grandson, Anthony. His widow, the dowager Countess of Rosslyn, died on 24 February 1975.

=== Descendants ===
Through his eldest son, Lord Loughborough, he was a grandfather of Anthony Hugh Francis Harry St Clair-Erskine, 6th Earl of Rosslyn (1917–1977), who married Athénaïs de Mortemart, only daughter of Louis Victor de Mortemart, Duc de Vivonne, and the Hon. Peter George Alexander St Clair-Erskine (1918–1939) of the Royal Air Force.

Through his youngest daughter, Lady Mary, he was a grandfather of Serena Mary Dunn (1934–2019), who married Jacob Rothschild, 4th Baron Rothschild; and Nell Mary Dunn (b. 1936), who married Jeremy Sandford and became a playwright and author.

Peerage of the United Kingdom
Preceded by Robert St Clair-Erskine	Earl of Rosslyn; 1890–1939	Succeeded by Anthony St Clair-Erskine
