= Keith Collins =

American actor, filmmaker and advocate

- Born: September 3, 1976 (age 50); Passaic, New Jersey, U.S.
- Occupations: Actor, Producer, Advocate
- Years active: 2000–present
- Website: keithcollinsmedia.com

Keith Collins (born September 3, 1976, in Passaic, New Jersey) is an American actor, filmmaker and advocate. He is best known for his work in The Meat Puppet, The Jersey Devil, The Evangelist, and The Samaritans.

Collins is a graduate of Clifton High School in New Jersey. He studied acting at New York City's School for Film and Television (later the New York Conservatory for Dramatic Arts) and graduated in 2004.

== Career ==
Collins created, produced and acted in the 2012 thriller The Meat Puppet released by Tomcat Films. Produced and acted in the 2015 comedy film The Jersey Devil released by Shami Media Group. Created, produced and acted in the 2017 Psychological thriller The Evangelist released by Sony Pictures Home Entertainment in the U.S., eOne Entertainment in North America and ITN Distribution worldwide and Created, produced and acted in the 2019 Thriller / Suspense film The Samaritans released by VIVA Pictures.

Collins has acted in many other films including The Coffee Shop, Stuck in the Middle, Gravedigger, Echelon 8, Billy Sample Reunion 108, The Great Fight, Games People Play:NY and has been featured on numerous TV shows such as Sex and the City and Guiding Light.

In 2015 Collins was awarded the Creative Growth Lifesaver Award at the Atlantic City Cinefest Film Festival for his work and achievements in film.

== Early life ==
While in New York, Collins was discovered by modeling agent Jan Gonet of Nytro Models. He would go on to have modeled for top designers such as Tommy Hilfiger, Calvin Klein, Ron Cheresken, Wilke-Rodriguez, French Connection, Nike and was the face of the underwear line PLAY alongside Mayte Garcia.

== Personal life ==
Keith Collins was diagnosed with Tourette syndrome at a young age of 5. Collins who suffered in his early life from the disorder has been medication free since 13. Collins continues to raise awareness and has hosted numerous charity functions for Tourette syndrome.

== Filmography ==
| Year | Film | Role |
|---|---|---|
| 2004 | Games People Play: New York | Keith |
| 2007 | The Gentleman | Steve Reynolds |
| 2009 | O.B.A.M. Nude | Suave |
| 2009 | Echelon 8 | Robert Wescott |
| 2010 | Three Chris's | Troy |
| 2010 | An Affirmative Act | Manny |
| 2010 | A Fight for Survival | Keith |
| 2010 | Non Compos Mentis | Dr. David Burns |
| 2010 | James St. James Presents Avantgarde | Angel |
| 2011 | The Infernal Room | Officer Rodriguez |
| 2011 | Psycho-Path: Mania | Dr. Michael Brett |
| 2011 | Fake | Darren |
| 2011 | Stuck in the Middle | Todd Levy |
| 2011 | The Great Fight | Graham Watson |
| 2011 | Bidentity Crisis | Jamie |
| 2011 | The Life Zone | Ramon |
| 2011 | Candys Room: Soleil Noir | Daddy |
| 2011 | Turkey Bowl | Billy 'Beef' Peters |
| 2012 | Violet To Earth | Bashhole |
| 2012 | Curiosity Killed The Cat | Jamie |
| 2012 | Coffee and a Bite | Jamie |
| 2012 | Coffee Klash | Jamie |
| 2012 | The Out-Sider | Jamie |
| 2012 | Little Big Boy | Keith |
| 2012 | The Replacement | Jamie |
| 2012 | The Meat Puppet | Andrew Shelton |
| 2013 | The Next Vigilante | Chuck |
| 2013 | Gravedigger | Steve Borden |
| 2013 | Reunion 108 | James Hammond |
| 2014 | The Coffee Shop | Jamie |
| 2014 | Lady Peacock | Wallflower |
| 2014 | Ball Boy | Coach Sven |
| 2014 | The Jersey Devil | James Burnett |
| 2014 | Snapshot | Rob |
| 2015 | Awake in the Woods | Derek |
| 2017 | The Evangelist | Bill Horton |
| 2019 | The Samaritans | Frank |
| 2020 | Rock, Paper, Scissors | Norman |
| 2021 | SCRAWL | Paul |
