= Sheila Chisholm =

Australian socialite and "it girl" (1895 – 1969)

- Lady Loughborough; Lady Milbanke; Princess Dmitri Alexandrovich of Russia
- Portrait of Chisholm by Cecil Beaton, 1930
- Born: Margaret Sheila Mackellar Chisholm; 9 September 1895; Wollogorang, New South Wales, Australia
- Died: 13 October 1969 (aged 74); London, England
- Burial: Rosslyn Chapel, Roslin, Midlothian, Scotland
- Spouse: Francis St Clair-Erskine, Lord Loughborough (divorced); Sir John Charles Peniston Milbanke, 11th Bt (divorced); Prince Dmitri Alexandrovich of Russia (m. 1954)
- Issue: Anthony St Clair-Erskine, 6th Earl of Rosslyn
- Father: Harry Chisholm
- Mother: Margaret Mackellar

Margaret Sheila Mackellar Chisholm (9 September 1895 – 13 October 1969) was an Australian socialite and "it girl" in British high society during and after World War I. She married three times: Francis St Clair-Erskine, Lord Loughborough (eldest son of the Earl of Rosslyn); Sir John Charles Peniston Milbanke, 11th Bt; and Prince Dmitri Alexandrovich of Russia. Chisholm also had close relationships with brothers Edward, Prince of Wales and Prince Albert of York, both future Kings of the United Kingdom. Chisholm's romantic liaison with Albert ended when his father, George V, told him to leave "the already-married Australian" and find someone more suitable.

Known for her striking beauty, she is likely the inspiration for the Australian phrase "a good-looking sheila".

== Family and early years ==
Sheila Chisholm was born on 9 September 1895 at Woollahra, Sydney, youngest child and only daughter of grazier Harry Chisholm and his wife Margaret, née Mackellar who owned a family property "Wollogorang", the centre of the locality now called Wollogorang, near Breadalbane, New South Wales. Her paternal great-grandfather was Scottish and arrived in Australia with the Second Fleet in 1790. The Chisholms became wealthy members of the Squattocracy in New South Wales, and she was raised on "Wollogorang" with her two older brothers, John and Roy. As the only girl in a rough, male-dominated world, she often attempted to match and outdo the working men at tasks on the station. She recalled how she liked to "go out further than the furthest man" when swimming at Bondi Beach, until she witnessed a man lose his leg in a shark attack. After her family moved to Sydney in 1912, she attended Kambala School for Girls. Chisholm was attracted to the arts and had a deep appreciation for Australia's flora and fauna. In her unpublished memoir, Waltzing Matilda, she described her adolescent self as "a queer mix of romanticism and boyishness ... I was quite unconscious of my looks."

== Adult life ==
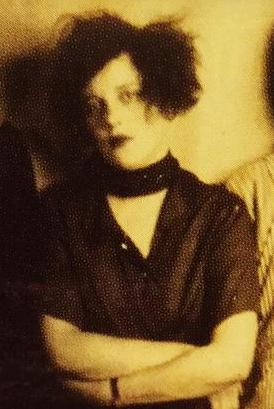
Chisholm at a fancy dress party, 1922

In 1914, Chisholm and her mother sailed to England on SS Mongolia. They planned to spend months in Europe, but their trip was extended by the onset of the First World War, making the long journey back to Australia too dangerous.

Chisholm and her mother travelled to Cairo where one of her brothers was stationed with an Australian cavalry regiment. In Cairo, Chisholm met the first of her three husbands, Lord Loughborough. Loughborough was a compulsive gambler, later immortalised as 'the Man who Broke the Bank at Monte Carlo'. The couple had two sons together. Their elder son, Anthony, succeeded his grandfather as Earl of Rosslyn. Their younger son, Peter, a Royal Air Force pilot, was killed on active service in September 1939 in the first weeks of the Second World War.

At the end of 1918, Chisholm met Bertie, the future George VI. Bertie's older brother, Edward, Prince of Wales, had fallen in love with her best friend, Freda Dudley Ward. They called themselves The Four Do's. In April 1920, Bertie ended his relationship with the still married Chisholm in return for a dukedom awarded by his father.

Chisholm dated Italian-American actor Rudolph Valentino, who gave her his "lucky bracelet". He died six months later (August 1926), causing Chisholm to think it was because she had taken his luck.

In 1928, she married Sir John Milbanke, and as Lady Milbanke, she was one of a series of society beauties photographed as classical figures by Madame Yevonde.

She inspired British author Evelyn Waugh to write his celebrated 1948 novel The Loved One.

In 1954, she married for the third and final time, to Prince Dmitri Alexandrovich of Russia who was living in exile in London.

== Death and legacy ==
Chisholm is buried at Rosslyn Chapel in the village of Roslin, Midlothian, Scotland. Her son commissioned a stained glass window of St Francis of Assisi surrounded by animals which can be seen in the chapel’s baptistry. In a nod to Chisholm's Australian heritage, there is a kangaroo in the bottom left hand corner of the window.

Chisholm had fallen into obscurity by the time of her death and was almost completely forgotten until the publication of journalist Robert Wainwright's 2014 biography Sheila: The Australian Beauty Who Bewitched British Society.

== Bibliography ==
Books

- Wainwright, Robert Wainright (2014). Sheila: The Australian Beauty Who Bewitched British Society. Allen & Unwin. ISBN 9781743311318.

Webpages

- Simpson, Caroline (1993). "Chisholm, Margaret Sheila". Australian Dictionary of Biography.
