= Vera Mary St Clair-Erskine, Countess of Rosslyn =

British aristocrat and Red Cross worker

The Right Honourable Countess of Rosslyn BEM
- Countess of Rosslyn in 1913
- Tenure: 8 October 1908 – 10 August 1939
- Born: Edith Vera Mary Bayley; 24 February 1887; Tunbridge Wells, Kent
- Died: 24 February 1975 (aged 88)
- Buried: Rosslyn Chapel
- Spouse(s): James St Clair-Erskine, 5th Earl of Rosslyn (m. 1908; died 1939)
- Issue: James Alexander Wedderburn St. Clair-Erskine (1909–1973): Mary Sybil St Clair-Erskine (1912–1993); David Simon St Clair-Erskine (1917–1985)

Vera Mary "Tommy" St Clair-Erskine, Countess of Rosslyn BEM (born Edith Vera Mary Bayley; 24 February 1887 – 24 February 1975) was a British aristocrat, socialite and war-worker.

Vera Bayley was born in 1887, the daughter of Irish parents Eric Bayley and Mary Bayley (née Smith). An actress known to her friends as "Tommy", Bayley met James St Clair-Erskine, 5th Earl of Rosslyn, and despite him being 19 years older than her, she became the earl's third wife on 8 October 1908 in a service at St George's register office in London.

Between 1908 and the outbreak of the First World War in August 1914, the earl and countess lived a full social life and were often written about and pictured in the press. At the outbreak of the war the countess left her two children at home and volunteered to work at a hospital in France run by her sister-in-law Millicent, Duchess of Sutherland. Formally enlisted into the Red Cross, she continued to work at her sister-in-law's hospital until 1917 resigning before the birth of her third child in November 1917. In June 1918 her services to Belgian wounded and refugees were rewarded with the award of the Belgian Queen Elisabeth Medal (Médaille de la reine Élisabeth).

After the war, the countess' marriage started to fail due to the earl's gambling addiction and infidelity, and in 1923 the countess started an affair of her own with diplomat and spy Bruce Lockhart.

Lockhart divorced his first wife in 1937 and for a period he and Vera lived together. Despite the affairs and living arrangements the countess and her husband remained married until his death in August 1939.

On the outbreak of the Second World War, the now Dowager Countess rejoined the Red Cross and did volunteer to go to Finland as a nurse to tend Finnish wounded during the Winter War but the trip did not happen. By 1942 she was in charge of the Red Cross unit packing food parcels for prisoners of war, one of whom was her eldest son, Hamish Erskine. At the end of the war she was awarded the British Empire Medal in the 1946 New Year Honours.

Her affair with Lockhart had ended and after Lockhart remarried, the countess lived in a Catholic convent near Heselmere in Surrey.

Rosslyn died on her 88th birthday at Edgecombe Nursing Home.
