= Anthony St Clair-Erskine, 6th Earl of Rosslyn =

British peer (1917–1977)

The Right Honourable The Earl of Rosslyn
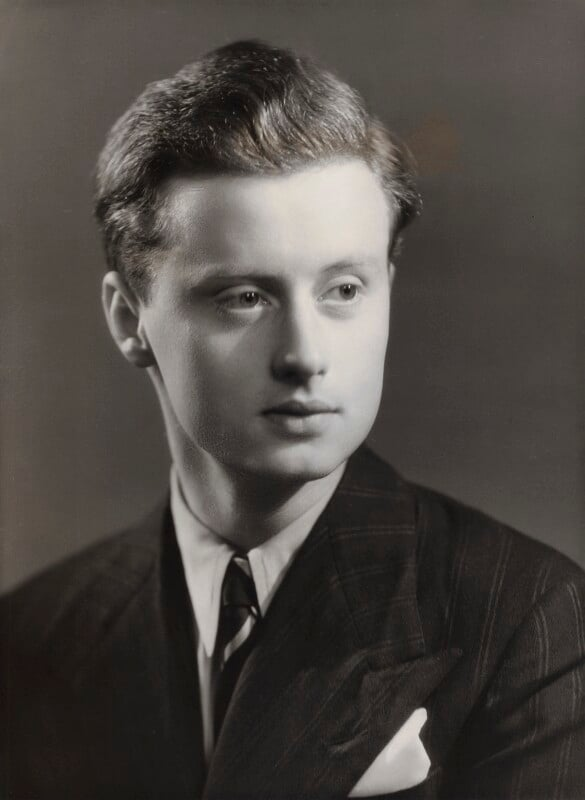

Member of the House of Lords Lord Temporal
- In office 11 August 1939 – 22 November 1977; Hereditary Peerage
- Preceded by: The 5th Earl of Rosslyn
- Succeeded by: The 7th Earl of Rosslyn

Personal details
- Born: Anthony Hugh Francis Harry St Clair-Erskine; 22 November 1917 London, England
- Died: 22 November 1977 (aged 60) Midlothian, Scotland
- Spouse: Athenais de Mortemart (m. 1955; div. 1962)
- Children: Lady Caroline Marten; Peter St Clair-Erskine, 7th Earl of Rosslyn
- Parent(s): Francis St Clair-Erskine, Lord Loughborough; Sheila Chisholm
- Relatives: Serena Dunn Rothschild (cousin); Nell Dunn (cousin); Alice St Clair (granddaughter)

Anthony Hugh Francis Harry St Clair-Erskine, 6th Earl of Rosslyn (18 May 1917 – 22 November 1977), styled Lord Loughborough from 1929 to 1939, was a British peer. The Earl's lands included the noted Rosslyn Chapel.

== Early life ==
Lord Rosslyn was born in London on 18 May 1917 and was known as "Tony". He was the eldest son of the former Margaret Sheila Mackellar Chisholm (1898–1969) and Hon. Francis Edward Scudamore St Clair-Erskine, styled Lord Loughborough (1892–1929), who was known as "the man who broke the bank at Monte Carlo". His younger brother was Peter George Alex St Clair-Erskine, who served in the Royal Air Force until his death in 1939. His parents divorced in 1926 and his mother married Sir John Milbanke, 11th Baronet in 1928. They also divorced and she married Prince Dmitri Alexandrovich of Russia in 1954.

His maternal grandfather was Harry Chisholm of Sydney. His paternal grandparents were James St Clair-Erskine, 5th Earl of Rosslyn and the former Violet Aline Vyner (the second daughter and co-heiress of Robert Charles de Grey Vyner of Gautby Hall and Newby Hall). His grandparents divorced in 1902, and in 1903 his grandmother married the English race car driver Charles Jarrott (father of director Charles Jarrott). Through his half-aunt, Lady Mary, he was a cousin of Serena Mary Dunn, who married Jacob Rothschild, 4th Baron Rothschild; and Nell Mary Dunn, who married Jeremy Sandford and became a playwright and author.

== Career ==
Upon his grandfather's death on 10 August 1939, as his father predeceased his grandfather, Anthony succeeded at the 6th Earl of Rosslyn. Lord Rosslyn was a friend of future American President John F. Kennedy, and wrote to him in 1940, stating:

"I read your book and I thought it very good indeed. It was beautifully written, though most American do not write beautifully."

In 1950, Lord Rosslyn added a stained glass memorial window in the baptistery Rosslyn Chapel, designed by William Wilson, dedicated to his late brother, a pilot who died in active service in 1939, and to his stepfather, Wg Cdr Sir John Milbanke, 11th Baronet, who died in 1947 from injuries also received during World War II. Later in the 1950s, he also led a programme of work to repair the roof and clean the interior carvings of the Chapel. In 1970, Lord Rosslyn added a second stained glass window, designed in a St Francis of Assisi theme by Carrick Whalen, and dedicated to his mother, Princess Dimitri of Russia who died in 1969.

== Personal life ==
On 3 August 1955, Lord Rosslyn was married to French citizen Athénaïs de Rochechouart de Mortemart, the only daughter of Louis Victor de Rochechouart de Mortemart, Duc de Vivonne, and Mme. Michaël Valéry Ollivier (née Solange Marie Paule d'Harcourt). Before their divorce in 1962, they were the parents of two children:

- Lady Caroline St Clair-Erskine (b. 1956), who married Michael Francis Marten, only son of Lt.-Col. Francis William Marten (eldest son of Vice-Admiral Sir Francis Arthur Marten) and Hon. Avice Irene Venables-Vernon (only daughter of Francis Venables-Vernon, 9th Baron Vernon), in 1991.
- Peter St Clair-Erskine, 7th Earl of Rosslyn (b. 1958), who married Helen Watters in 1982.

Lord Rosslyn died on 22 November 1977 at Midlothian and was buried at Rosslyn Chapel in Scotland.

=== Descendants ===
Through his son, he was posthumously a grandfather of James William St Clair-Erskine, Lord Loughborough (b. 1986), actress Lady Alice St Clair-Erskine (b. 1988), The Hon. Harry St Clair-Erskine, and Lady Lucia St Clair-Erskine.

Peerage of the United Kingdom
Preceded by James St Clair-Erskine	Earl of Rosslyn; 1939–1977	Succeeded by Peter St Clair-Erskine
