= Uncoupled =

American romantic comedy television series

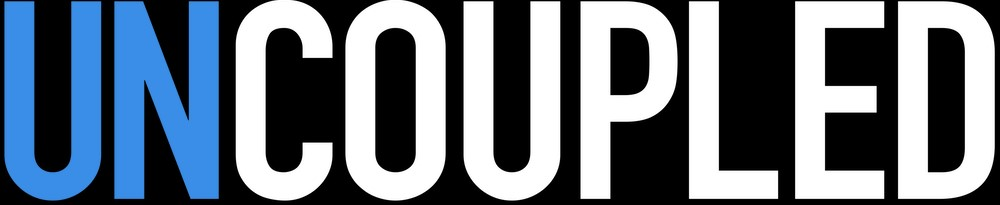
- Genre: Romantic comedy-drama
- Created by: Darren Star; Jeffrey Richman
- Starring: Neil Patrick Harris; Tuc Watkins; Tisha Campbell; Marcia Gay Harden; Emerson Brooks; Brooks Ashmanskas
- Country of origin: United States
- Original language: English
- No. of seasons: 1
- No. of episodes: 8

Production
- Executive producers: Jeffrey Richman; Darren Star; Lilly Burns; Neil Patrick Harris; Abraham Higginbotham
- Production location: New York City
- Camera setup: Single-camera
- Running time: 27–31 minutes
- Production companies: Darren Star Productions; Jeffrey Richman Productions; MTV Entertainment Studios; Jax Media

Original release
- Network: Netflix
- Release: July 29, 2022

Uncoupled is an American romantic comedy television series created by Darren Star and Jeffrey Richman that premiered on Netflix on July 29, 2022.

The series was featured in the Netflix "Top 10" list at number six for one week. In January 2023, it was announced the show would not be renewed for a second season. In February 2023, Showtime (owned by Paramount) picked up the series for a second season. The second season was originally scheduled to begin filming in July 2023; however, due to the 2023 Writers Guild of America strike, production on the second season went on pause in June 2023. On March 21, 2024, Showtime announced that they would not move forward with the second season.

== Synopsis ==
The series stars Neil Patrick Harris as a newly single gay Manhattanite navigating the dating scene for the first time in 17 years after getting abruptly dumped by his long-term partner. As he adjusts to being single in his late 40s, he discovers that the gay dating environment has changed while he was in a relationship, and he rapidly realizes that in order to not be single forever, he must take action.

== Cast and characters ==
=== Main ===
- Neil Patrick Harris as Michael Lawson, a New York City real estate agent
- Tuc Watkins as Colin McKenna, Michael's ex of 17 years
- Tisha Campbell as Suzanne Prentiss, Michael's business partner
- Marcia Gay Harden as Claire Lewis, a wealthy woman who was recently left by her husband and becomes a client of Michael’s
- Emerson Brooks as Billy Burns, a TV weatherman and one of Michael's best friends
- Brooks Ashmanskas as Stanley James, an art dealer and one of Michael's best friends

=== Recurring ===
- André De Shields as Jack, an older man who is Michael's down the hall neighbor at 44 Gramercy Park
- Colin Hanlon as Jonathan #1, engaged to Jonathan #2 and one of Michael's best friends
- Gonzalo Aburto de la Fuente as Wyatt, Billy's love interest
- Jai Rodriguez as Jonathan #2, engaged to Jonathan #1 and one of Michael's best friends
- Nic Rouleau as Tyler Hawkins, a real estate broker and rival to Michael and Suzanne
- Jasai Chase Owens as Kai Prentiss, Suzanne's son
- Stephanie Faracy as Lisa Lawson, Michael's mother
- Byron Jennings as Ben Lawson, Michael's father

=== Guest ===
- Gilles Marini as Paolo, an Italian businessman who Michael has a one-night stand with
- Peter Porte as Josh Gibson, a dermatologist who Michael briefly dates
- David Burtka as Jerry, Billy's co-worker and Stanley's love interest (Burtka and Neil Patrick Harris are married in real life.)
- Dan Amboyer as Luke, a third grade teacher who is Michael's love interest
- David Pittu as Dennis, Colin and Michael's marriage counsellor
- Bruce Altman as Henry, Claire's ex-husband
- David A. Gregory as Corey, a realtor Michael re-connects with on a ski trip
- Tamala Jones as Mia, Suzanne's friend
- Jonah Platt as Horst

== Episodes ==
No.	Title	Directed by	Written by	Original release date
1	"Chapter 1"	Andrew Fleming	Darren Star & Jeffrey Richman	July 29, 2022
Michael hosts a surprise 50th birthday party for his partner of 17 years, Colin. Billy, Michael's best friend, meets him and introduces him to Wyatt, his date. Colin tells him that he is moving out to a new apartment to "figure things out". Michael worries that he will be divorced after meeting with Claire, who is selling her apartment after being divorced by her husband. He attends couples therapy with Colin and dominates the conversation. Colin breaks up with Michael afterwards. Michael's business partner Suzanne calls to tell him that she knows where Colin is living and who he is living with.
2	"Chapter 2"	Andrew Fleming	Darren Star	July 29, 2022
Michael and Suzanne meet for drinks and she tells him that she saw Colin through the window of his new apartment with Tyler, Michael's rival real estate agent. Michael confronts Tyler at a company charity event, but Tyler explains that he only helped Colin find the apartment. He also says that it doesn't seem that Colin is with anyone else, frustrating Michael as it meant that Colin just wanted to leave him. Michael beats Tyler in getting Claire's listing for her apartment, after explaining to Claire how their situations are similar.
3	"Chapter 3"	Zoe Cassavetes	Jeffrey Richman	July 29, 2022
Michael's friends, Billy and Stanley, encourage him to hook up with someone to forget about Colin. He is hesitant at first but downloads Grindr when he learns Colin is also hooking up with people. Michael and Suzanne help buyer Paolo find an apartment. Michael and Paolo receive notifications of the other being a Grindr user; Michael agrees to Paolo's invitation to hook up. Michael meets with Stanley to talk about the hookup, but is furious to learn that he attended a dinner party at Colin's new apartment.
4	"Chapter 4"	Zoe Cassavetes	Abraham Higginbotham	July 29, 2022
Claire has only received one offer for her apartment and wants to wait for a better one, but Michael suggests that she is holding on to the apartment because she can't imagine a new life for herself. Michael sees Colin again and they have a friendly chat that turns into an argument. Michael finds his couples counselor and angrily tells him that Colin broke up with him after their session, but the counselor suggests that Michael drove Colin away. Suzanne and Claire bond at a party and Claire agrees to sell the apartment. Michael apologizes to Stanley.
5	"Chapter 5"	Andrew Fleming	Don Roos	July 29, 2022
Michael goes to a spiritual event with Suzanne. They do not think it worked until the next day when he wakes up feeling better than ever, meets a hot dermatologist that his dad set him up with, and hits it off. Meanwhile, Suzanne realizes that the man on her bed that the spiritual guru referred to was her own son. All seem to go well for Michael and his dermatologist date until he finds out the dermatologist was more than what he was prepared for.
6	"Chapter 6"	Andrew Fleming	Aeysha Carr & Robin Schiff	July 29, 2022
While attending a roller disco event hosted by Billy, both Michael and Stanley find prospective love interests. Michael breaks his toe and is forced into a boot when his handsome teacher Luke accidentally runs over his toe. The two bond over the negative traits of their exes, but Michael breaks it off when he thinks they're going too fast. Stanley discovers Jerry, an annoying co-worker of Billy, follows his art gallery. The two set up a date, but it falls apart when Jerry tries to seduce him into buying his mother's art. Claire tries to search for apartments, but with little success; she finds one she loves next to Michael.
7	"Chapter 7"	Peter Lauer	Abraham Higginbotham & Ira Madison III	July 29, 2022
Michael, Stanley, and Billy decide to go on a gay ski trip where Michael spots a handsome realtor he met years before, named Corey. As he starts to get close to Corey, he also gets distracted by the revelation from Horst that Colin is in Miami with his new boyfriend, a hot and successful architect, younger than Michael. Michael gets very drunk and Billy's vanity cannot save Michael from getting a souvenir on his face from the ski trip. A final dialog between Michael and Stanley, intentionally ambiguous, about Michael's physical and emotional pain seems finally give Michael some trust about his future. Meanwhile, the relationship between Suzanne and Claire deepens at a girls' night out.
8	"Chapter 8"	Peter Lauer	Story by : Darren Star & Jeffrey Richman; Teleplay by : Jeffrey Richman	July 29, 2022
The Jonathans are getting married. Michael has Suzanne come over and help him cover up his bruises with makeup. At the party, Michael tries to preempt awkwardness by approaching Colin. He mistakenly thinks a random stranger is Colin's new boyfriend; actually Colin is there alone. To Michael's surprise, he no longer feels much animosity towards Colin and they dance together. During dinner, Wyatt catches everyone's attention as Billy's date, until he storms out on Billy for flirting with a waiter. Michael leaves the party and arrives at his house to find Colin there, who says he may have made a mistake.

== Reception ==
=== Critical response ===
On review aggregator website Rotten Tomatoes, the series holds an 73% approval rating based on 49 critic reviews, with an average rating of 6.6/10. The website's critics consensus reads, "While Uncoupled struggles to integrate the comedic thrills of modern dating with its more serious concerns, the uneasy mixture makes for a surprisingly mature evolution of the Darren Star formula." On Metacritic, it has a score of 64 out of 100, based on 25 critics, indicating "generally favorable reviews". The Washington Post and The Guardian found the show "flat and lifeless", while the Los Angeles Times described it as "a sweet, grown-up entertainment".

=== Accolades ===
Year	Award	Category	Recipient(s)	Result	Ref.
2023	Critics' Choice Awards	Best Supporting Actress in a Comedy Series	Marcia Gay Harden	Nominated	
2023	Queerties Awards	TV Comedy	Uncoupled	Nominated	

== See also ==
- LGBTQ culture in New York City
