= William & Catherine: A Royal Romance =

- Movie poster
- Written by: Linda Yellen; Christopher Momenee
- Directed by: Linda Yellen
- Starring: Alice St. Clair; Dan Amboyer; Jane Alexander; Victor Garber; Jean Smart
- Theme music composer: Patrick Seymour
- Country of origin: United States
- Original language: English

Production
- Producers: Brad Krevoy; Linda Yellen; Christopher Landry

Original release
- Network: Hallmark Channel
- Release: August 27, 2011

William & Catherine: A Royal Romance is a 2011 American made-for-television biographical film that stars Alice St Clair as Catherine Middleton and Dan Amboyer as Prince William of Wales. The movie also features Jane Alexander as Queen Elizabeth II, Victor Garber as Charles, Prince of Wales, and Jean Smart as Camilla, Duchess of Cornwall. The plot summary provided by Internet Movie Database is, "Chronicles Prince William and Kate Middleton, as young students at St. Andrews, William's Army training at Sandhurst Military Academy, their break-up, reunification, engagement and planning of royal nuptials, and advice from William's grandmother, the Queen."

"We are not afraid to explore the real side of the relationship and the challenges," Dan Amboyer, who plays William, said while promoting the movie at a meeting of the Television Critics Association. "Diana features in the film," St. Clair said. "There is just really a great sense of relationships within the family. So there is William's relationship with his father and his brother, and you see him calling upon Diana's interview, and watching this interview that Diana did and using her words to kind of guide him through his troubled moments."

Garber, who played the Prince of Wales, said the recent unavoidable worldwide television wedding event had likely boosted the public mood regarding Britain's monarchy. "I think it has done an enormous service to the royal family, and I think that this film really sort of attempts to kind of humanize them," he said. "I think because enough time has passed since the tragedy of Diana’s death, that they’re sort of being seen in a different way. And I think that William and Kate have definitely had an enormously positive effect on their reputation, on their how they are perceived." Even Garber's character has likely enjoyed a boost in popularity, unthinkable once. "I think that he was vilified in a way," he said. "Over time that has sort of softened, and yes, I think I certainly my opinion of him has changed somewhat having played him and listened to him. I think he’s kind of an amazing guy, actually."

The movie is directed by and produced by Emmy Award-winning producer Linda Yellen (Playing for Time). The co-producer is Emmy Award nominee Brad Krevoy (Taking Chance).

The movie aired on August 27, 2011, in the United States on the Hallmark Channel. The movie was filmed on location in Bucharest.

== Cast ==
- Alice St Clair – Catherine Middleton
- Dan Amboyer – Prince William of Wales
- Lorand Stoica – Prince William (age 13)
- Victor Garber – Charles, Prince of Wales
- Kazia Pelka – Carole Middleton
- Jean Smart – Camilla, Duchess of Cornwall
- Jane Alexander – Queen Elizabeth II
- Andrew Pleavin – Col Huntington
- Jenna Harrison – Jenna Kirk
- Michael Lumsden – Michael Middleton
- Lesley Harcourt – Diana, Princess of Wales
- Stanley Eldridge – Prince Harry of Wales
- Mark Penfold – Prince Philip, Duke of Edinburgh
