= The Crimson Field =

- Genre: Drama
- Written by: Sarah Phelps
- Directed by: David Evans; Richard Clark; Thaddeus O'Sullivan
- Country of origin: United Kingdom
- Original language: English
- No. of series: 1
- No. of episodes: 6

Production
- Executive producers: Anne Pivcevic; Sarah Phelps
- Producer: Annie Tricklebank
- Cinematography: Matt Gray BSC
- Running time: 60 minutes
- Production company: BBC Drama Production

Original release
- Network: BBC One; BBC One HD
- Release: 6 April – 11 May 2014

The Crimson Field is a British period drama television series that was broadcast beginning on BBC One on 6 April 2014. The series shows the lives of medics and the patients at a fictional field hospital in France during the First World War.

== Cast ==
Cast of The Crimson Field

- Rupert Graves as Major Edward Crecy
- Oona Chaplin as Kitty Trevelyan
- Hermione Norris as Grace Carter
- Suranne Jones as Sister Joan Livesey
- Kevin Doyle as Lt Col Roland Brett
- Kerry Fox as Sister Margaret Quayle
- Alex Wyndham as Captain Miles Hesketh-Thorne
- Jeremy Swift as Quartermaster Sergeant Reggie Soper
- Richard Rankin as Captain Thomas Gillan
- Marianne Oldham as Rosalie Berwick
- Alice St. Clair as Flora Marshall
- Jack Gordon as Orderly Corporal Peter Foley
- Liam James Collins as Tommy
- Lewis C. Elson as Injured Soldier

== Production ==
Originally called The Ark, the series was commissioned by Ben Stephenson and Danny Cohen as part of the BBC World War I centenary season. Sarah Phelps, the creator of The Crimson Field said: "I am bouncing off the walls with excitement at having such an extraordinary talented cast, bouncing off the walls."

Filming began in August 2013. The Historic Dockyard Chatham and HMS Gannet featured in the first episode of the series doubling as the Port of Boulogne, France. Dyrham Park appeared in scenes as a French hotel.

== Episodes ==
No.	Title	Directed by	Written by	Original release date	UK viewers (millions)
1	"Episode 1"	David Evans	Sarah Phelps	6 April 2014	7.83
2	"Episode 2"	David Evans	Sarah Phelps	13 April 2014	6.89
3	"Episode 3"	Richard Clark	Sarah Phelps	20 April 2014	6.31
4	"Episode 4"	Richard Clark	Sarah Phelps	27 April 2014	6.25
5	"Episode 5"	Thaddeus O'Sullivan	Sarah Phelps	4 May 2014	6.01
6	"Episode 6"	Thaddeus O'Sullivan	Sarah Phelps	11 May 2014	6.33

== Cancellation ==
The show was cancelled after one season, due to a lacklustre critical and audience response, as well as budgetary considerations towards other BBC series. Phelps revealed she had planned four more seasons.

== See also ==
- Alexis Carrel and Henry Drysdale Dakin, developers of the pre-antibiotic antiseptic Carrel-Dakin method depicted in the series.
- Edith Cavell, the British Red Cross nurse whose execution by German firing squad is mentioned in Episode 6.
