= Hamish Erskine =

English aristocrat

The Honourable Hamish Erskine
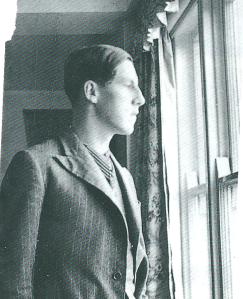
- Born: Hon. James Alexander Wedderburn St. Clair-Erskine; 23 August 1909; White Waltham, Berkshire, England
- Died: 17 December 1973 (aged 64); Swindon, Wiltshire, England
- Other name: Hamish St. Clair-Erskine
- Education: Eton College; Oxford University
- Parent(s): The 5th Earl of Rosslyn; Vera Mary St Clair-Erskine, Countess of Rosslyn
- Awards: Military Cross

Maj. Hon. James Alexander Wedderburn "Hamish" St. Clair-Erskine MC (23 August 1909 – 17 December 1973) was a British soldier and aristocrat aesthete. Though he was homosexual, he was engaged to Nancy Mitford and inspired the male lead in her novel Highland Fling.

== Early life ==
Known as Hamish, he was born at Chetwode, White Waltham, Maidenhead, the first child of James St Clair-Erskine, 5th Earl of Rosslyn (1869–1939), and his third wife, Vera Mary Bayley. He had two elder half-siblings, Lady Rosabelle (1891–1956) and Francis, Lord Loughborough (1892–1929); and two younger siblings, Lady Mary (1912–1993) and Maj. Hon. David (1917–1985).

At Eton College, Erskine was the lover of Tom Mitford. He attended Oxford University, where he was friends with Evelyn Waugh and John Betjeman. In the Letters edited by Betjeman's daughter, Candida Lycett Green, and published in 1996, she remembers how her father and Erskine "went out in fast cars, driving all night in the flat country near Coolham". According to James Lees-Milne's diaries:

At Oxford he had the most enchanting looks – mischievous, twinkling eyes, slanting eyebrows. He was slight of build, well dressed, gay as gay, always snobbish however, and terribly conscious of his nobility [...] the toast of the university.

== Career ==
Erskine fought in the World War II, became a major in the Coldstream Guards, escaping from a prison camp and walking through Italy to join the Allied troops. He was awarded a Military Cross in 1943.

In 1969, together with Anthony Rhodes, he translated Tapestries by Mercedes Viale Ferrero.

He was the dame de compagnie (lady's companion) to Daisy Fellowes and Enid Kenmare.

== Personal life ==
Erskine was gay, nevertheless, Nancy Mitford fell in love with him; her depression at this unrequited love resulted in her attempting suicide. Erskine was the basis for the male lead in her first novel, Highland Fling.

In the 1920s he was friends with Aileen Plunket and her husband, the Hon. Brinsley Plunket, and was guest at their home Luttrellstown Castle, County Dublin. He was also good friends with Patrick Leigh Fermor and his wife Joan: in the 1940s the three of them drove down through France and Italy, and later Joan accompanied Peter Quennell and Erskine to Sicily where she took photographs for an article Quennell was writing.

After Erskine's death in 1973, Alan Payan Pryce-Jones described him as a "bright apparition who once upon a time swept past them like a kingfisher: all colour and sparkle and courage [...] [he found] small place in a world which turned away from an unambitious charmer whose only enduring gift was his charm".

== Legacy ==
Adrian Maurice Daintrey painted his portrait, sold by Christie's on 25 August 2005.

Erskine was portrayed by James Musgrave in the UKTV series Outrageous (2025).
