= New York Conservatory for Dramatic Arts =

American private theatre school

The New York Conservatory for Dramatic Arts
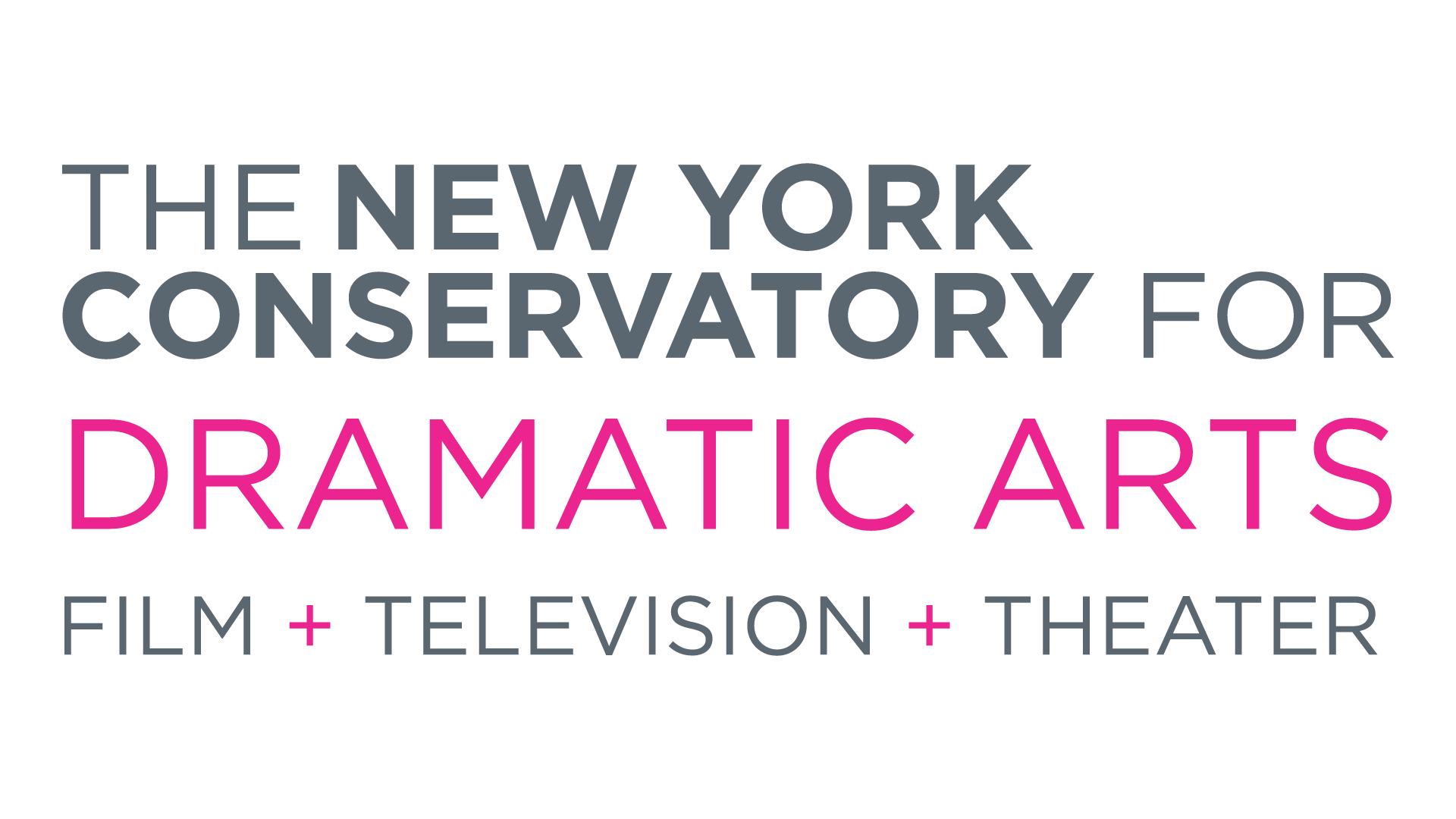
- On-Camera Acting School
- Motto: Developing Actors the Industry Wants To Work With Since 1980
- Type: Private drama school
- Active: 1980–2025
- Students: 200 admitted per year
- Location: New York City, New York, United States
- Campus: Urban
- Nickname: NYCDA
- Website: www.nycda.edu

The New York Conservatory for Dramatic Arts (NYCDA) was a private drama school in New York City. It was originally conceived for the purpose of training actors for film and television acting and is accredited by the National Association of Schools of Theatre (NAST) to offer associate degrees.

On June 3, 2025, NYCDA announced that it would close on August 31, 2025, and began the process of assisting students in transferring to other programs.

== History ==
Actors in Advertising, which grew into the School for Film and Television (SFT) and later became the New York Conservatory for Dramatic Arts (NYCDA), was founded in 1980 by Joan See, a student of Sanford Meisner. NYCDA founded the annual Joan See Memorial Scholarship in 2018.

In 1995, NYCDA was accredited by the National Association of Schools of Theatre. In 2013, the institution began granting an associate degree in Film & Television Performance after approval by the New York State Board of Regents. In 2018, The New York Conservatory launched a two-year associate degree in Musical Theater Performance.

NYCDA's campus was located in Manhattan's Chelsea/Flatiron district, most recently at 39 West 19th Street.

The final day of instruction was on August 29, 2025.

== Academics ==
NYCDA taught the Meisner technique, pioneered by Sanford Meisner. Auditioning for the school was part of the application process for all programs. The school offered two-year Associate in Occupation Studies degrees and a 4-week summer program worth 6 credits. Associates were offered in the following four areas:

- Film and Television Performance
- Musical Theatre Performance
- Theatre Performance
- Media Production for the Actor

== Notable alumni ==
- Jacob Batalon
- Ser'Darius Blain
- Keith Collins (2004)
- Manish Dayal
- Ryan Dorsey
- David Del Rio (2009)
- Reid Ewing
- Matthew Fox
- Justin Guarini
- Zulay Henao
- Shelley Hennig
- Vicky Jeudy
- Titus Makin Jr.
- Ashleigh Murray
- Carolina Ravassa
- Alice St. Clair
- Josh Sussman
- Ashlynn Yennie

== See also ==
- List of defunct colleges and universities in New York
