= William Alexander (judge) =

Sir William Alexander (1754–29 June 1842), was a barrister and a judge in the English Court of Chancery.

Alexander was the eldest son of William Alexander (1729-1819), of Edinburgh, and his wife Christine Aitchison. His paternal grandfather was William Alexander Lord Provost of Edinburgh 1752 to 1754 and MP for Edinburgh 1755 to 1761.

He was admitted to the Middle Temple on 3 May 1771, and subsequently was called to the English Bar 22 November 1782. After practising in the Court of Chancery with high reputation as an equity and real property lawyer for nearly twenty years, he was made a Queen's Counsel in 1800. He became one of the Masters in Chancery in 1809, and Chief Baron of the Exchequer on 9 January 1824, on which occasion he was made a member of the Privy Council of the United Kingdom and knighted. In December 1830, he resigned to enable Lord Lyndhurst to take his place as Lord Chief Baron, and retired to his estate at Airdrie, in the county of Lanark.

He inherited the estate of Cloverhill in Dunbartonshire in 1837. He died in London 29 June 1842. He is buried in the small burial ground attached to Roslyn Chapel, south of Edinburgh.

Legal offices
Preceded by Sir Richard Richards	Lord Chief Baron of the Exchequer; 1824–1830	Succeeded by Lord Lyndhurst
