= Dan Amboyer =

American actor (born 1985)

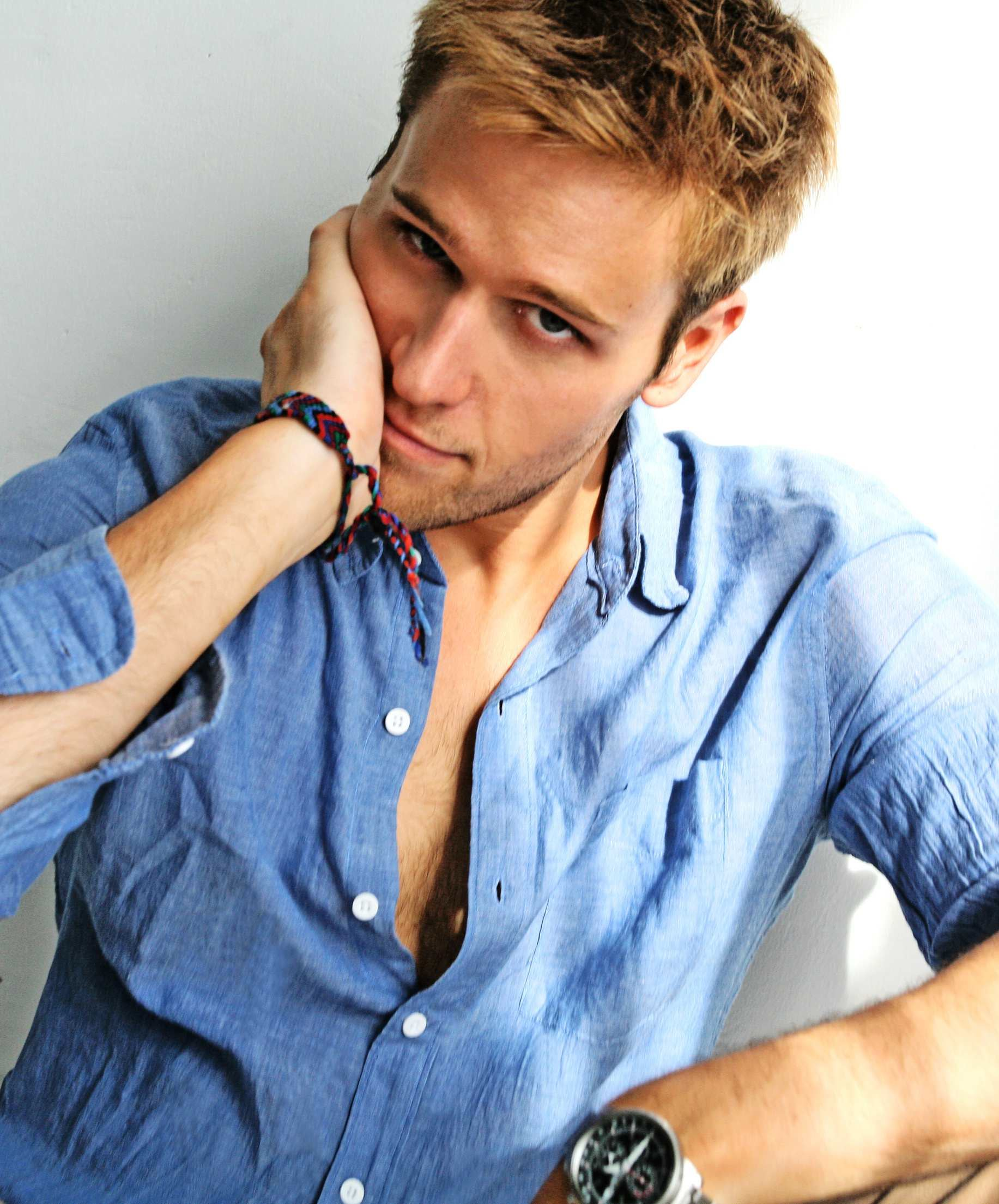
- Born: December 28, 1985 (age 40); Detroit, Michigan, U.S.
- Education: Carnegie Mellon University (BFA)
- Occupation: Actor
- Years active: 2007–present
- Spouse: Eric P. Berger (m. 2017)
- Children: 2
- Website: www.danamboyer.com

Dan Amboyer (born December 28, 1985) is an American actor, best known for his starring roles on the Darren Star series Younger and the NBC spin-off series The Blacklist: Redemption, and for starring as Prince William of Wales in the television film William & Catherine: A Royal Romance. He also plays Luke on the Netflix comedy series Uncoupled opposite Neil Patrick Harris.

== Life and career ==
Amboyer was born in Detroit to Claudia and Dr. Donald Amboyer. He attended The Roeper School and arts high school Interlochen Arts Academy. Amboyer subsequently continued his studies at the Carnegie Mellon School of Drama, where he was offered early admittance following his junior year of high school. After graduation, he relocated to New York City.

Amboyer has appeared in numerous television shows and films and worked extensively in theatre. Amboyer is a founding member of the theatre company Exit, Pursued by a Bear. In 2019, he made his directorial debut helming the world premiere of Whirlwind Off-Broadway, which Elisabeth Vincentelli of The New Yorker called a "delightful 80 minutes."

He starred on the Darren Star hit series Younger and the NBC spin-off series The Blacklist: Redemption. He also starred as Prince William of Wales in the TV movie William & Catherine: A Royal Romance.

He can be seen as Luke on the hit Netflix comedy series Uncoupled opposite Neil Patrick Harris.

In 2024, he was cast in the lead role of The Writer in Jason Forbach's short thriller film The Delicate Medium.

== Personal life ==
On October 7, 2017, Amboyer publicly came out as gay and announced that he had married his long-term partner, Eric P. Berger. Amboyer's coming out sparked national attention with televised coverage on Access Hollywood, E! News and Entertainment Tonight.

Amboyer and Berger have two children: a son and a daughter.

== Filmography ==
=== Films ===
Year	Title	Role	Notes
2014	Lily in the Grinder	Bean	Short film
2015	Love the Coopers	Handsome young man at diner	
2016	Batman v Superman: Dawn of Justice	Drone pilot	
2017	Brawl in Cell Block 99	Longman	
2018	The Wrong Son	Ian	
2020	Killer Daddy Issues	Luke	
TBA	The Delicate Medium	The Writer	Short film; Pre-production

=== Television ===
Year	Title	Role	Notes
2007	Law & Order	Tood Barton	Episode: "Good Faith"
2008	All My Children	French Fantasy Man	Episode: "9.862" (Uncredited)
2011	William & Catherine: A Royal Romance	Prince William of Wales	Television film
2011	Body of Proof	George White	Episode: "Dead Man Walking"
2013	Inside Amy Schumer	Ron	Episode: "The Horror"
2013	Graceland	1920's Gangster	Episode: "Goodbye High" (Uncredited)
2013	Person of Interest	Don Juan	Episode: "Liberty"
2014	Unforgettable	Eric Oliver	Episode: "The Haircut"
2014	Wall Street	Douglas	Television film
2015–2016	Younger	Thad Weber / Chad Weber	15 episodes
2015	After Ever After	Phillip	Episode: "Aurora and Phillip"
2015	Benders	Christian	Episode: "Prodigal Son"
2015	AfterBuzz TV's Spotlight On	Himself	Episode: "Dan Amboyer Interview"
2017	The Blacklist: Redemption	Dan Pool / Trevor	6 episodes
2017	Modern Aliens: A Documentary Periodical	Henly Fisk	Episode: "Aliens and the Election Part 1"
2017	A Very Merry Toy Store	Randy Forrester	Television film
2018	Faith Under Fire	Russ Holder	Television film
2018	Tell Me a Story	Blake	3 episodes
2018	Blue Bloods	Nicholas Papadopoulos	Episode: "Handcuffs"
2018	Country Christmas Album	Trevor	Television film
2019	Hawaii Five-0	Preston Parks	Episode: "Ka Ia'au kumu 'ole o Kahilikolo"
2020	Vicious Mannies	Kenny	7 episodes
2022	Uncoupled	Luke	Episode: "Chapter 6"
2022	Dynasty	Graham	2 episodes

=== Video games ===
Year	Title	Role	Notes
2013	Grand Theft Auto V	The Local Population	Voice role
2018	Red Dead Redemption II	Various	Voice role

== Off-Broadway ==
- Orange Lemon Egg Canary by Rinne Groff — 2006 (PS 122)
- As You Like It — 2007 (HERE Arts Center)
- The Play About the Naked Guy — 2008 (Baruch Center for the Performing Arts)
- Bash'd — 2008 (The Zipper Factory)
- For the Love of Christ — 2009 (Cherry Lane Theatre)
- Dido, Queen of Carthage — 2010 (Exit, Pursued by a Bear)
- The Great Unknown by William Hauptman and Jim Wann — 2010 (The American Place Theatre)
- Restoration Comedy by Amy Freed — 2010 (Exit, Pursued by a Bear)
- These Seven Sicknesses — 2011 (Exit, Pursued by a Bear)
- Friends and Relations — 2011 (Abingdon Theatre)
- Remembrance of Things Past by Harold Pinter and Di Trevis, US premiere with Richard Armitage — 2014 (92nd Street Y)
- Squash by AR Gurney, world premiere — (The Flea Theater) — 2016
- Directed the premiere of Whirlwind by Jordan Jaffe – 2019 (The Wild Project)

== Regional theatre ==
- Cabaret, directed by Alan Paul - Clifford Bradshaw (Barrington Stage Company)
- The Importance of Being Earnest, directed by Matt Lenz — Jack 'Earnest' Worthing (The Cape Playhouse)
- The Metromaniacs, world premiere by David Ives directed by Michael Kahn — Dorante (Shakespeare Theatre Company)
- As You Like It, directed by Adrian Noble — Orlando (Old Globe Theatre)
- Richard III, directed by Lindsay Posner — Henry VII (Old Globe Theatre)
- Inherit the Wind, directed by Adrian Noble — Bertram Cates (Old Globe Theatre)
- Le Grand Meaulnes, directed by Di Trevis — Augustin Meaulnes (Quantum Theatre)
- The Eclectic Society — Tom Rockwell (Walnut Street Theatre)
- Grease — Kenickie (The Muny)
- Crazy for You — Lank Hawkins (North Shore Music Theatre)
- Doctor Faustus — (Utah Shakespearean Festival)
- Henry IV — (Utah Shakespearean Festival)
- Romeo and Juliet — (Utah Shakespearean Festival)
- Speak to Me, Annie — (Utah Shakespearean Festival)
- My Fair Lady — (Utah Shakespearean Festival)
- Camelot — Utah Shakespearean Festival
- Godspell — Jesus (Meadow Brook Theatre)
- A Christmas Carol — (Meadow Brook Theatre)
- Swan Lake — (American Ballet Theatre)
- Joseph and the Amazing Technicolor Dreamcoat starring Donny Osmond — National Tour
- Urinetown, directed by John Carrafa — Officer Lockstock (Carnegie Mellon University)
- As You Like It, directed by Di Trevis — Jaques (Carnegie Mellon University)
- Compleat Female Stage Beauty — Ned Kynaston (Carnegie Mellon University)
