= Earl of Rosslyn =

Title in the Peerage of the United Kingdom

Earldom of Rosslyn
- Arms: Quarterly, 1st Argent, a Cross engrailed Sable (St Clair); 2nd Argent, a pale Sable (Erskine); 3rd Azure, a Bend between six Crosses-crosslet fitchée Or (Mar); 4th Argent, on a Chevron between three Roses Gules, a Fleur-de-lys of the field for difference (Wedderburn). Crests: 1st, Argent, a Demi-Phoenix in flames proper (St Clair); 2nd, An Eagle's Head erased proper (Wedderburn). Supporters: Dexter: An Eagle wings inverted proper, gorged with a Collar Argent, thereon a Rose Gules. Sinister: A Griffin wings elevated proper.
- Creation date: 21 April 1801
- Created by: King George III
- Peerage: Peerage of the United Kingdom
- First holder: Alexander Wedderburn, 1st Baron Loughborough
- Present holder: Peter St Clair-Erskine, 7th Earl of Rosslyn
- Heir apparent: Jamie St Clair-Erskine, Lord Loughborough
- Remainder to: The 1st Earl's heirs male of the body lawfully begotten
- Subsidiary titles: Baron Loughborough; Baronet 'of Alva'
- Status: Extant
- Seat: Rosslyn Castle
- Motto: Below the Shield: FIGHT; Over the first Crest: RINASCO PIÙ GLORIOSO (I am reborn more glorious); Over the 2nd Crest ILLÆSO LUMINE SOLEM (Enjoy the sun with unimpaired light)

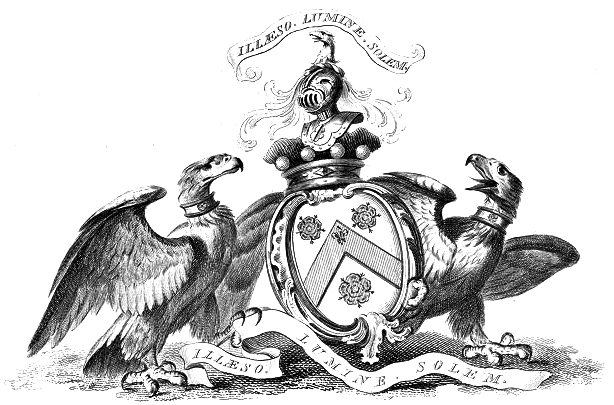
Arms of Alexander Wedderburn as 1st Baron Loughborough

Earl of Rosslyn is a title in the Peerage of the United Kingdom. It was created in 1801 for Alexander Wedderburn, 1st Baron Loughborough, Lord Chancellor from 1793 to 1801, with special remainder to his nephew Sir James St Clair-Erskine, as Wedderburn had no surviving issue of his own. Wedderburn had already been created Baron Loughborough, of Loughborough in the County of Leicester, in the Peerage of Great Britain in 1780, with normal remainder to the heirs male of his body, and Baron Loughborough, of Loughborough in the County of Surrey, in the Peerage of Great Britain in 1795, with the same remainder as the earldom. The 1780 barony became extinct upon his death, but the 1795 barony and the earldom passed, by the special remainder, to his nephew, who thus became the second Earl of Rosslyn. The second Earl was a Lieutenant-General in the Army and also held political office as Lord Privy Seal and Lord President of the Council.

His son, the third Earl, was a General in the Army and held political office as Master of the Buckhounds and Under-Secretary of State for War. He was succeeded by his son, the fourth Earl. He served as Captain of the Honourable Corps of Gentlemen-at-Arms (Chief Government Whip in the House of Lords) in Lord Salisbury's second Conservative administration.

As of 2015, the titles are held by his great-great-grandson, the seventh Earl, who succeeded his father in 1977. He is a former police officer with the Metropolitan Police Service. Lord Rosslyn is also one of the ninety elected hereditary peers that remain in the House of Lords after the passing of the House of Lords Act 1999, and sits as a cross-bencher.

The Erskine Baronetcy, of Alva in the County of Clackmannan, was created in 1666 for Charles Erskine in the Baronetage of Nova Scotia. He represented Clackmannan and Stirling in the Parliament of Scotland. His eldest son, the second Baronet, was killed at the Battle of Landen in 1693. He was succeeded by his younger brother, the third Baronet. He was one of the Scottish representatives to the 1st Parliament of Great Britain and later represented Clackmannanshire. His eldest son, the fourth Baronet, was killed at the Battle of Lauffeld in 1747. His younger brother and successor, the fifth Baronet, was a Lieutenant-General in the Army and sat as Member of Parliament for Ayr Burghs and Anstruther Easter Burghs. Erskine married Janet Wedderburn, daughter of Peter Wedderburn and sister of Alexander Wedderburn, 1st Earl of Rosslyn. He was succeeded by his son, the aforementioned sixth Baronet, who in 1805 succeeded his uncle Lord Rosslyn in the barony of Loughborough and earldom of Rosslyn. See above for further history of the baronetcy.

The family seat is Rosslyn Castle in Midlothian, Scotland. The Earl also owns Rosslyn Chapel.

== Erskine baronets, of Alva (1666) ==
- Sir Charles Erskine, 1st Baronet (1643–1690)
- Sir James Erskine, 2nd Baronet (c. 1670–1693)
- Sir John Erskine, 3rd Baronet (1672–1739)
- Sir Charles Erskine, 4th Baronet (died 1747)
- Sir Henry Erskine, 5th Baronet (c. 1710–1765)
- Sir James St Clair-Erskine, 6th Baronet (1762–1837) (succeeded as Earl of Rosslyn in 1805)

== Earls of Rosslyn (1801) ==
- Alexander Wedderburn, 1st Earl of Rosslyn (1733–1805)
- James St Clair-Erskine, 2nd Earl of Rosslyn (1762–1837)
- James Alexander St Clair-Erskine, 3rd Earl of Rosslyn (1802–1866)
- Robert Francis St Clair-Erskine, 4th Earl of Rosslyn (1833–1890)
- James Francis Harry St Clair-Erskine, 5th Earl of Rosslyn (1869–1939)
- Anthony Hugh Francis Harry St Clair-Erskine, 6th Earl of Rosslyn (1917–1977)
- Peter St Clair-Erskine, 7th Earl of Rosslyn (b. 1958)

The heir apparent is the present holder's son, Jamie William St Clair-Erskine, Lord Loughborough (b. 1986).

Line of succession
- Peter St Clair-Erskine, 7th Earl of Rosslyn (born 1958)
  - (1). Jamie William St Clair-Erskine, Lord Loughborough (born 1986)
  - (2). Hon. Harry St Clair-Erskine (born 1995)
