= William Alexander (Lord Provost) =

Scottish banker and politician

William Alexander MP (1690–1761) was an 18th-century Scottish banker and politician who served as Lord Provost of Edinburgh 1752 to 1754

== Life ==
He was born in Glasgow around 1690 the son of John Alexander, a tobacco merchant, and his wife Janet Cuninghame of Craigends in Renfrewshire. He moved to Edinburgh around 1720 and was involved in "continental trade", largely trading Virginian tobacco with France. This would have been shipped from Edinburgh's harbour town of Leith.

From 1730 to 1760 he was Director of the Royal Bank of Scotland. In 1738 he was made a Trustee for the Committee of Fisheries and Manufactures. From 1755 to 1760 he was Commissioner for Forfeited Estates (linking to those who supported the Jacobite cause in the rebellion of 1745).

In 1733 he joined Edinburgh Town Council as a Burgess and in 1752 was elected Lord Provost in succession to George Drummond and was succeeded in 1754 by Drummond in his third term of office. In 1754 he was elected as MP for Edinburgh. He stood down from this role due to ill health early in 1761 and died on 25 July 1761.

He is buried in a small enclosure in the outer burial ground of Roslyn Chapel just south of Edinburgh, adjacent to Sir William Alexander.

== Family ==
He was married (around 1720) to Marione Louisa de la Croix. Their children included William Alexander (1729–1819) and Alexander John Alexander FRSE (d.1801) later of George Square. It is thought this is the same "Alexander Alexander" listed as a shipmaster living at Bernard Street in Leith in 1773.

William the son married Christine Aitchison and was father to Sir William Alexander (1755–1842) Lord Chief Baron of the Exchequer and uncle of Isabella Alexander (1768–1851) who married John Peter Hankey and were grandparents to Thomson Hankey.
