= Peter St Clair-Erskine, 7th Earl of Rosslyn =

Scottish nobleman (born 1958)

The Right Honourable The Earl of Rosslyn CVO QPM
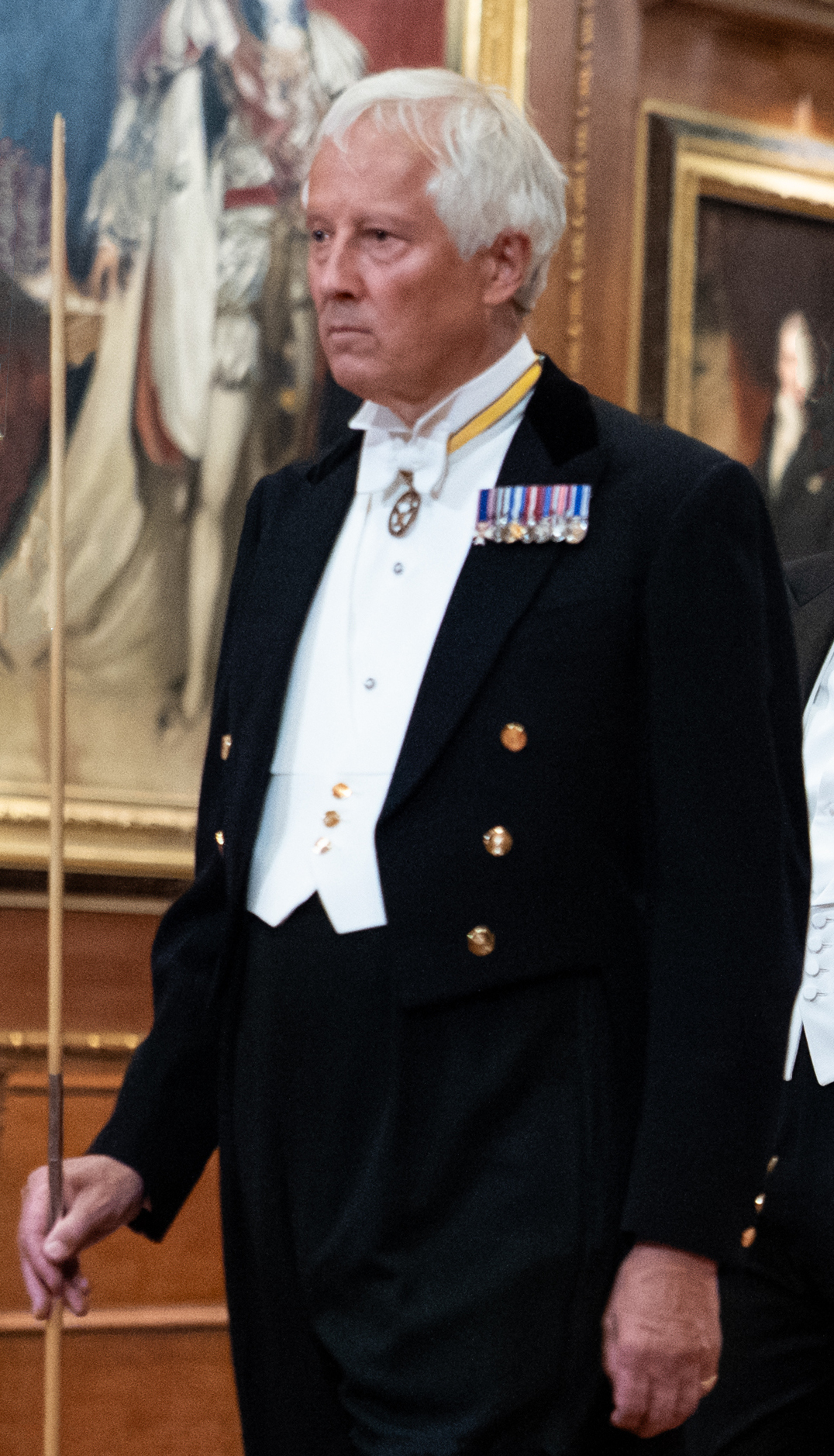
- Rosslyn in 2025

Lord Steward of the Household
- Incumbent
- Assumed office 22 February 2023
- Monarch: Charles III
- Preceded by: The Earl of Dalhousie

Member of the House of Lords
- Lord Temporal
- Hereditary peerage 17 December 1979 – 11 November 1999
- Preceded by: The 6th Earl of Rosslyn
- Succeeded by: Seat abolished
- Elected Hereditary Peer; 11 November 1999 – 29 April 2026
- Election: 1999
- Preceded by: Seat established
- Succeeded by: Seat abolished

Personal details
- Born: Peter St Clair-Erskine; 31 March 1958 (age 68)
- Party: Crossbencher
- Spouse: Helen Watters (m. 1982)
- Children: James St Clair-Erskine, Lord Loughborough; Lady Alice St Clair-Erskine; The Hon. Harry St Clair-Erskine; Lady Lucia St Clair-Erskine
- Parent(s): Anthony St Clair-Erskine, 6th Earl of Rosslyn; Athenais de Mortemart
- Education: University of Bristol
- Occupation: Courtier, police officer
- Styles
- Arms of St Clair-Erskine, Earl of Rosslyn

Peter St Clair-Erskine, 7th Earl of Rosslyn (/ˈsaɪnklɛər ˈɜːrskɪn ... ˈrɒzlɪn/), CVO QPM (born 31 March 1958), also known as Peter Loughborough, is a Scottish peer and police officer. He is Lord Steward of the Royal Household and Personal Secretary to Their Majesties, as well as a former Metropolitan Police Commander. The Earl's lands include Rosslyn Chapel.

== Background and education ==
Lord Rosslyn was educated at Ludgrove School, Eton College and the University of Bristol. He inherited his titles in 1977, and took his seat in the House of Lords on 15 January 1980. Ahead of the passage of the House of Lords Act 1999 which excluded most hereditary peers he was elected as one of the 28 peers in the Crossbench group who were to remain in the House of Lords.

As of 2022, in 43 years in the House of Lords he had only spoken once and voted five times, each in relation to reform of the Lords.

== Career ==
Rosslyn joined the Metropolitan Police Service in 1980 on the recommendation of his third cousin Lord Strathnaver, a former detective and heir apparent of the 24th Countess of Sutherland. He reached the rank of chief inspector in the 1990s. In 1994 he led the undercover Operation Troodos, a successful crackdown on drug dealers in west London, including the drug supplier of the Marquess of Blandford, later Duke of Marlborough. From 2003 to 2014, he was head of the Royalty and Diplomatic Protection Department (since amalgamated into Protection Command). He received the Queen's Police Medal in the 2009 New Year Honours and was reputedly the Queen's "favourite policeman".

In March 2014, Lord Rosslyn was appointed as Master of the Household to The Prince of Wales and The Duchess of Cornwall at Clarence House.

On 29 September 2014, Lord Rosslyn was appointed a Commander of the Royal Victorian Order (CVO) upon relinquishing his appointment as Head of Royalty and Specialist Protection Department.

On 22 February 2023, he was appointed Lord Steward of the Household, succeeding the 17th Earl of Dalhousie, and Personal Secretary to Their Majesties by Charles III. In this role, he took part in the 2023 Coronation.

== Family ==
He married Helen Watters in 1982 and they have two sons and two daughters, including actress Lady Alice St Clair-Erskine.

Lady Rosslyn runs the London Original Print Fair.

== Honours ==

Date	Appointment	Ribbon	Post-nominal letters	Notes
6 February 2002	Queen Elizabeth II Golden Jubilee Medal			
2009 New Year Honours	Queen's Police Medal		QPM	Distinguished Service
6 February 2012	Queen Elizabeth II Diamond Jubilee Medal			
29 September 2015	Commander of the Royal Victorian Order		CVO	
6 February 2022	Queen Elizabeth II Platinum Jubilee Medal			
6 May 2023	King Charles III Coronation Medal			
	Police Long Service and Good Conduct Medal			

Court offices
Preceded by The Earl of Dalhousie	Lord Steward; 2023–present	Incumbent
Peerage of the United Kingdom
Preceded by Anthony St Clair-Erskine	Earl of Rosslyn; 1977–present Member of the House of Lords (1979–1999)	Incumbent
Parliament of the United Kingdom
New office created by the House of Lords Act 1999	Elected hereditary peer to the House of Lords under the House of Lords Act 1999; 1999–2026	Office abolished under the House of Lords (Hereditary Peers) Act 2026
Order of precedence in England and Wales
Preceded by The Duke of Norfolk as Earl Marshal	Gentlemen as Lord Steward of the Household	Succeeded by The Lord Benyon as Lord Chamberlain of the Household
Order of precedence in Scotland
Preceded by The Earl of Caledon	Gentlemen	Succeeded by The Earl of Craven
Order of precedence in Northern Ireland
Preceded by The Duke of Norfolk as Earl Marshal	Gentlemen as Lord Steward of the Household	Succeeded by The Lord Benyon as Lord Chamberlain of the Household
