= Alice St Clair =

English actress (born 1988)

Lady Alice St Clair-Erskine
- Born: 14 June 1988 (age 38)
- Other names: Alice St Clair; Alan Moon
- Education: Heathfield St Mary's School; Bedales School; New York Conservatory for Dramatic Arts
- Occupations: actress, poet
- Parent(s): Peter St Clair-Erskine, 7th Earl of Rosslyn; Helen Watters

Lady Alice St Clair-Erskine (born 14 June 1988), also known by her stage name Alice St Clair, is an English actress known for playing Catherine Middleton in William & Catherine: A Royal Romance and Flora Marshall in The Crimson Field.

== Early life and education ==
St Clair was born in 1988, the elder daughter of Peter St Clair-Erskine, 7th Earl of Rosslyn and Helen Watters. She was educated at Heathfield St Mary's School and Bedales School. In 2010, she was presented as a debutante.

== Career ==
St Clair spent her early years in Los Angeles, where she worked for Akiva Goldsman before moving to New York City and attending the New York Conservatory for Dramatic Arts on an acting scholarship. Her first film appearance was in 2010 in Sarah's Key.

In 2011, she appeared as Kate Middleton in the Hallmark Channel TV movie William & Catherine: A Royal Romance. In 2015, she played Flora Marshall in the BBC television drama series The Crimson Field. In 2018 St Clair starred as Catherine de Valois in The New Generation Festival's Henry V.

St Clair is also a poet who works under the name of Alan Moon and a voice-over artist whose work includes Air B and B, BBC Radio 4's Homefront and BBC Radio 3's Words and Music.

== Filmography ==
=== Film ===
Year	Title	Role	Notes
2010	Sarah's Key	Serveuse café Mozart	(as Alice Erskine)
2013	Before I Sleep	Zooey	

=== Television ===
Year	Title	Role	Notes
2011	William & Catherine: A Royal Romance	Catherine Middleton	TV film
2014	The Crimson Field	Flora Marshall	Main cast, 6 episodes
