= Wilke-Rodriguez =

American men's apparel company acquired by Men's Wearhouse in 2002

Wilke-Rodriguez, Inc.
- Type: Private
- Industry: Retail
- Founded: New York, New York, 1987
- Headquarters: New York, New York
- Key people: Founded by Terry Wilke, Eddie Rodriguez
- Products: Apparel

Wilke Rodriguez was a men's fashion company created by Terry Wilke and Eddie Rodriguez. It was started in 1987, first showing the collection out of Terry's Upper West Side apartment in New York City. Wilke died in 1992 at age 36. By then the company had grown to over $10 million in sales.

Rodriguez later sold the trademark to Men's Wearhouse in 2002. Men's Warehouse tested the concept of Eddie Rodriguez specialty stores featuring apparel, accessories and home furnishings, but discontinued this in 2005. As of 2011 Men's Warehouse still uses the Wilke Rodriguez name on multiple suits and other men's clothing.

== See also ==
- Men's Warehouse
