= Listed buildings in Sevenoaks district, Kent =

There are about 1,650 Listed Buildings in the Sevenoaks District, Kent , which are buildings of architectural or historic interest.

- Grade I buildings are of exceptional interest.
- Grade II* buildings are particularly important buildings of more than special interest.
- Grade II buildings are of special interest.

The lists follow Historic England’s geographical organisation, with entries grouped by county, local authority, and parish (civil and non-civil). The following lists are arranged by parish.

parishes	Listed buildings list	Grade I	Grade II*	Grade II
Ash-cum-Ridley	Listed buildings in Ash-cum-Ridley			
Badgers Mount	no listed buildings			
Brasted	Listed buildings in Brasted			
Chevening	Listed buildings in Chevening, Kent			
Chiddingstone	Listed buildings in Chiddingstone			
Cowden	Listed buildings in Cowden			
Crockenhill	Listed buildings in Crockenhill			
Dunton Green	Listed buildings in Dunton Green			
Edenbridge	Listed buildings in Edenbridge, Kent			
Eynsford	Listed buildings in Eynsford			
Farningham	Listed buildings in Farningham			
Fawkham	Listed buildings in Fawkham			
Halstead	Listed buildings in Halstead, Kent			
Hartley	Listed buildings in Hartley, Sevenoaks			
Hever	Listed buildings in Hever, Kent			
Hextable	Listed buildings in Hextable			
Horton Kirby and South Darenth	Listed buildings in Horton Kirby and South Darenth			
Kemsing	Listed buildings in Kemsing			
Knockholt	Listed buildings in Knockholt			
Leigh	Listed buildings in Leigh, Kent			
Otford	Listed buildings in Otford			
Penshurst	Listed buildings in Penshurst			
Riverhead	Listed buildings in Riverhead, Kent			
Seal	Listed buildings in Seal, Kent			
Sevenoaks	Listed buildings in Sevenoaks			
Sevenoaks Weald	Listed buildings in Sevenoaks Weald			
Shoreham	Listed buildings in Shoreham, Kent			
Sundridge with Ide Hill	Listed buildings in Sundridge with Ide Hill			
Swanley	Listed buildings in Swanley			
West Kingsdown	Listed buildings in West Kingsdown			
Westerham	Listed buildings in Westerham			
