= Picturehouse =

Picturehouse may refer to:

- Movie theater
- Picturehouse (company), a film distribution company in New York, active 2005–2008, which was relaunched in 2013
- Picturehouse (band), an Irish pop band, active 1996–2004, which was reformed in 2013
- Picturehouse Cinemas, a British chain of cinemas, which started in 1989
- Picturehouse Entertainment, a British film distribution company, started in 2010 and owned by the cinema chain
- The Picture House, Poundsbridge, a timber-framed house built in 1593, formally named Poundsbridge Manor
