= Listed buildings in Penshurst =

Historic structures in Kent, England

Penshurst is a village and civil parish in the Sevenoaks District of Kent, England.. It contains three grade I, thirteen grade II* and 96 grade II listed buildings that are recorded in the National Heritage List for England.

This list is based on the information retrieved online from Historic England.

== Key ==
Grade	Criteria
I	Buildings that are of exceptional interest
II*	Particularly important buildings of more than special interest
II	Buildings that are of special interest

== Listing ==
Name	Grade	Location	Type	Completed (Note: The date given is the date used by Historic England as significant for the initial building or that of an important part in the structure's description.)	Date designated	Grid ref. (Note: The grid reference is based on the British national grid reference system, sometimes known as OSGB36, used by the Ordnance Survey.) Geo-coordinates	Notes	Entry number (Note: The "List Entry Number" is a unique number assigned to each listed building and scheduled monument by Historic England.)	Image	Wikidata
Church of St John the Baptist	I				10 September 1954	TQ5273243859; 51°10′25″N 0°11′00″E		1243204	Church of St John the Baptist More images	Q17529875
Penshurst Place	I				10 September 1954	TQ5274543976; 51°10′29″N 0°11′01″E		1243169	Penshurst Place More images	Q7164746
Wall Running South South East From Southern Tip of Penshurst Place and Returning Eastward	II*				10 September 1954	TQ5275643873; 51°10′25″N 0°11′02″E		1243174	Wall Running South South East From Southern Tip of Penshurst Place and Returning Eastward More images	Q17545585
Garden Wall to North, East and South of Penshurst Place Gardens	II*				10 September 1954	TQ5294344033; 51°10′30″N 0°11′12″E		1243045	Upload Photo	Q17545559
Wall Running South South East From Gatehouse to River	II				10 September 1954	TQ5281043802; 51°10′23″N 0°11′04″E		1243046	Upload Photo	Q26535756
South Central Entrance Tower to Penshurst Place and Wall Abutting to East	I				16 January 1975	TQ5277843948; 51°10′28″N 0°11′03″E		1243044	Upload Photo	Q96264993
Gatehouse and Gateway Leading to Penshurst Place and Also to Well Place	II				10 September 1954	TQ5280843817; 51°10′23″N 0°11′04″E		1272994	Gatehouse and Gateway Leading to Penshurst Place and Also to Well Place More images	Q26562785
Inner Garden Wall to North and West of Formal Garden of Penshurst Place	II*				16 January 1975	TQ5274143919; 51°10′27″N 0°11′01″E		1273071	Upload Photo	Q17545862
North Lodge to Penshurst Place	II				16 January 1975	TQ5254444112; 51°10′33″N 0°10′51″E		1243271	Upload Photo	Q26535955
Fir Tree House Tea Rooms	II				16 January 1975	TQ5261443787; 51°10′23″N 0°10′54″E		1243270	Fir Tree House Tea Rooms More images	Q26535954
The Rectory	II				10 September 1954	TQ5269943849; 51°10′25″N 0°10′59″E		1273072	The Rectory More images	Q26562856
Well House With Rustic Seat at TQ 517455	II	B2176			5 November 1990	TQ5179645497; 51°11′19″N 0°10′15″E		1244258	Upload Photo	Q26536887
Rustic Seat in Grounds of Redwood at TQ 522451	II	B2176			5 November 1990	TQ5216844999; 51°11′02″N 0°10′33″E		1272448	Upload Photo	Q26562282
Threshing Barn at Beggar's Barn Farm	II	Beggar's Barn Farm Road			16 January 1975	TQ5218844742; 51°10′54″N 0°10′34″E		1272959	Upload Photo	Q26562754
Spring Cottage	II	Bullingstone Lane, Poundsbridge			16 January 1975	TQ5431441541; 51°09′08″N 0°12′18″E		1243330	Upload Photo	Q26536013
Chafford Park	II*	Chafford Park, Fordcombe			10 September 1954	TQ5162639478; 51°08′04″N 0°09′57″E		1243036	Upload Photo	Q17545548
Brick Barn to West and Slightly North of Chafford Park	II*	Chafford Park, Fordcombe			16 January 1975	TQ5158439510; 51°08′05″N 0°09′55″E		1243038	Upload Photo	Q17545554
Barn to West of Brick Barn at Chafford Park	II	Chafford Park, Fordcombe			16 January 1975	TQ5157139482; 51°08′04″N 0°09′54″E		1243040	Upload Photo	Q26535752
Front Garden Wall and Mounting Block at Chafford Park	II	Chafford Park, Fordcombe			16 January 1975	TQ5162339488; 51°08′05″N 0°09′57″E		1273019	Upload Photo	Q26562809
Whitepost Farmhouse	II	Chiddingstone Hoath			16 January 1975	TQ5093441544; 51°09′12″N 0°09′24″E		1243006	Upload Photo	Q26535722
Finches	II	Chiddingstone Hoath			16 January 1975	TQ5074541729; 51°09′18″N 0°09′15″E		1259163	Upload Photo	Q26550306
Tubs Hole	II	Coldharbour Road			16 January 1975	TQ5152941615; 51°09′13″N 0°09′55″E		1273175	Upload Photo	Q26562949
Wall Along Road to South of Coldharbour Farmhouse	II	Coldharbour Road, Coldharbour			16 January 1975	TQ5130141770; 51°09′19″N 0°09′44″E		1259020	Upload Photo	Q26550186
Coldharbour Farmhouse	II	Coldharbour Road, Coldharbour			16 January 1975	TQ5129741797; 51°09′20″N 0°09′43″E		1259153	Upload Photo	Q26550297
Hamsell Cottage Hamsell Farmhouse	II	Cooper's Lane, Poundsbridge			16 January 1975	TQ5349941513; 51°09′08″N 0°11′36″E		1243273	Upload Photo	Q26535957
Palmer's Farmhouse	II	Cooper's Lane, Pounsdbridge, Palmer's Farm			16 January 1975	TQ5304041005; 51°08′52″N 0°11′12″E		1243274	Upload Photo	Q26535958
Culver House Hammerfield Hammerfield Cottage Hammertower	II	Culver House Road			16 January 1975	TQ5233244361; 51°10′42″N 0°10′41″E		1243267	Upload Photo	Q26535951
Culver Lodge	II	Culver Lodge Road			16 January 1975	TQ5243144232; 51°10′37″N 0°10′45″E		1243268	Upload Photo	Q26535952
Moat Cottages	II	5-6, Doubleton Lane			14 November 2001	TQ5241644127; 51°10′34″N 0°10′45″E		1389493	Upload Photo	Q26668927
Doubleton Farmhouse	II	Doubleton Farm			16 January 1975	TQ5201244203; 51°10′37″N 0°10′24″E		1243269	Upload Photo	Q26535953
Doubleton Cottage	II	Doubleton Farm			16 January 1975	TQ5196744210; 51°10′37″N 0°10′22″E		1272961	Upload Photo	Q26562756
Hill Corner	II	1-3, Fordcombe			16 January 1975	TQ5271940247; 51°08′28″N 0°10′54″E		1243035	Upload Photo	Q26535749
Barn to North of Springhill	II	Fordcombe			16 January 1975	TQ5227140937; 51°08′51″N 0°10′32″E		1243033	Upload Photo	Q26535747
The Old Lodge Spring Hill	II	Fordcombe			16 January 1975	TQ5212140758; 51°08′45″N 0°10′24″E		1243034	Upload Photo	Q26535748
Springhill	II*	Fordcombe			10 September 1954	TQ5227940917; 51°08′50″N 0°10′33″E		1243121	Upload Photo	Q17545575
Barn to West of Springhill	II	Fordcombe			16 January 1975	TQ5225540914; 51°08′50″N 0°10′31″E		1243128	Upload Photo	Q26535829
Tender Meads	II	Fordcombe			16 January 1975	TQ5273240125; 51°08′24″N 0°10′55″E		1243146	Upload Photo	Q26535847
Hartley's Post Office Stone Row	II	Fordcombe			16 January 1975	TQ5268240266; 51°08′29″N 0°10′52″E		1273038	Upload Photo	Q26562827
Black and White Cottage Springhill	II	Fordcombe			16 January 1975	TQ5214240732; 51°08′44″N 0°10′25″E		1273069	Upload Photo	Q26562854
Wall to East of Churchyard of St Peter	II	Fordcombe			16 January 1975	TQ5255640365; 51°08′32″N 0°10′46″E		1273070	Upload Photo	Q26562855
The Birches	II	Fordcombe Road			16 January 1975	TQ5245443521; 51°10′14″N 0°10′46″E		1243047	Upload Photo	Q26535757
Star House Including Boutique	II*	Fordcombe Road			10 September 1954	TQ5250143570; 51°10′16″N 0°10′48″E		1243221	Star House Including Boutique More images	Q17545590
Ford Place Farmhouse	II	Fordcombe Road, Ford Place			16 January 1975	TQ5260142895; 51°09′54″N 0°10′52″E		1259021	Upload Photo	Q26550187
Mitre Cottage	II	Fordcombe Road, Fordcombe			29 March 1974	TQ5295040007; 51°08′20″N 0°11′06″E		1243041	Upload Photo	Q26535753
Stable Block to Rear of Palmer's Lodge	II	Fordcombe Road, Fordcombe			16 January 1975	TQ5328240367; 51°08′31″N 0°11′23″E		1243043	Upload Photo	Q26535755
Palmer's Lodge	II	Fordcombe Road, Fordcombe			16 January 1975	TQ5329740354; 51°08′31″N 0°11′24″E		1243168	Upload Photo	Q26535861
Ashurst Park North Lodge	II	Fordcombe Road, Fordcombe			16 January 1975	TQ5291140029; 51°08′21″N 0°11′04″E		1273026	Upload Photo	Q26562816
Salmons House	II	Grove Road			16 January 1975	TQ5117943210; 51°10′05″N 0°09′39″E		1243008	Upload Photo	Q26535724
Blower's Hill Cottage	II	Grove Road			16 January 1975	TQ5119342594; 51°09′45″N 0°09′39″E		1259022	Upload Photo	Q26550188
South Park	II	Grove Road, South Park			16 January 1975	TQ5204742679; 51°09′47″N 0°10′23″E		1273158	Upload Photo	Q26562936
The Grove	II	Grove Road, The Grove			16 January 1975	TQ5178442904; 51°09′55″N 0°10′10″E		1273157	Upload Photo	Q26562935
The Old Smithy (A.k.a. Forge Stores) And Forge Garage Cottage	II	High Street			10 February 2011	TQ5258443645; 51°10′18″N 0°10′52″E		1396452	The Old Smithy (A.k.a. Forge Stores) And Forge Garage Cottage More images	Q26675239
1-3, Leicester Square	II	1-3, Leicester Square			10 September 1954	TQ5276543831; 51°10′24″N 0°11′02″E		1273073	1-3, Leicester Square More images	Q26562857
Archway Connecting No. 3 and the Old Guildhouse	II	Leicester Square			10 September 1954	TQ5275743826; 51°10′24″N 0°11′02″E		1243048	Archway Connecting No. 3 and the Old Guildhouse More images	Q26535758
The Post Office and House Adjoining Post Office	II	Leicester Square			10 September 1954	TQ5275643810; 51°10′23″N 0°11′02″E		1243049	The Post Office and House Adjoining Post Office More images	Q26535759
Wall Cottage	II	Leicester Square			10 September 1954	TQ5277843818; 51°10′24″N 0°11′03″E		1272979	Wall Cottage More images	Q26562772
The Old Guildhouse	II*	Leicester Square			16 January 1975	TQ5275143824; 51°10′24″N 0°11′01″E		1272985	The Old Guildhouse More images	Q17545855
Retaining Wall in Front of the Square	II	Leicester Square			10 September 1954	TQ5276743807; 51°10′23″N 0°11′02″E		1272987	Upload Photo	Q26562779
Lilac Cottage	II	Lilac Cottage Road			16 May 1990	TQ5240344859; 51°10′58″N 0°10′45″E		1244257	Upload Photo	Q26536886
Leicester House	II	1 and 2, Main Street			16 January 1975	TQ5268743762; 51°10′22″N 0°10′58″E		1243051	Leicester House More images	Q26535761
Longford	II	Main Street			10 September 1954	TQ5264443725; 51°10′21″N 0°10′56″E		1243054	Longford More images	Q26535764
The Leicester Arms Hotel	II	Main Street			16 January 1975	TQ5270343760; 51°10′22″N 0°10′59″E		1243250	The Leicester Arms Hotel More images	Q26535935
The Cottage	II	Main Street			10 September 1954	TQ5266043744; 51°10′21″N 0°10′57″E		1243259	The Cottage More images	Q26535943
Kirkwood Garden Shop La Petite Hair Salon	II	Main Street			10 September 1954	TQ5263543715; 51°10′20″N 0°10′55″E		1243263	Kirkwood Garden Shop La Petite Hair Salon More images	Q26535947
Residence of Mrs Barrows	II	Main Street			10 September 1954	TQ5261943703; 51°10′20″N 0°10′54″E		1272958	Residence of Mrs Barrows More images	Q26562753
The Buxton House Stores	II	Main Street			16 January 1975	TQ5267943757; 51°10′22″N 0°10′58″E		1272989	The Buxton House Stores More images	Q26562781
1 and 2 Rectory Cottages	II	Main Street			16 January 1975	TQ5272143763; 51°10′22″N 0°11′00″E		1273075	1 and 2 Rectory Cottages More images	Q26562859
Quaintways Tea Rooms	II	Main Street			10 September 1954	TQ5266643751; 51°10′21″N 0°10′57″E		1273076	Quaintways Tea Rooms More images	Q26562860
Colquhoun House	II	Main Street			10 September 1954	TQ5265643736; 51°10′21″N 0°10′56″E		1273077	Colquhoun House More images	Q26562861
Burzes Cottages	II	3 and 4, New Road			16 January 1975	TQ5234142138; 51°09′30″N 0°10′38″E		1273093	Upload Photo	Q26562877
Nashes Farmhouse	II	New Road, Nashes Farm			16 January 1975	TQ5287042024; 51°09′25″N 0°11′05″E		1259023	Upload Photo	Q26550189
Former Threshing Barn to South of Nashes Farmhouse	II	New Road, Nashes Farm			16 January 1975	TQ5286941988; 51°09′24″N 0°11′05″E		1273094	Upload Photo	Q26562878
The Nunnery	II	Nunnery Lane			16 January 1975	TQ5184541645; 51°09′14″N 0°10′11″E		1243017	Upload Photo	Q26535732
Holt's Crest	II	Poundsbridge			16 January 1975	TQ5287840946; 51°08′51″N 0°11′03″E		1243272	Upload Photo	Q26535956
Tudor Cottage	II	Poundsbridge			16 January 1975	TQ5404141756; 51°09′16″N 0°12′05″E		1243336	Upload Photo	Q26536019
Holt's Cottage	II	Poundsbridge			16 January 1975	TQ5293340984; 51°08′52″N 0°11′06″E		1272931	Upload Photo	Q26562730
Little Poundsbridge	II	Poundsbridge Hill			2 October 1990	TQ5383241711; 51°09′14″N 0°11′54″E		1272449	Upload Photo	Q26562283
The Old Mill House	II	Poundsbridge Hill, Poundsbridge			16 January 1975	TQ5396341758; 51°09′16″N 0°12′01″E		1243276	Upload Photo	Q26535960
Poundsbridge Farmhouse	II	Poundsbridge Hill, Poundsbridge			16 January 1975	TQ5387441696; 51°09′14″N 0°11′56″E		1243277	Upload Photo	Q26535961
The Picture House	II	Poundsbridge Hill, Poundsbridge			10 September 1954	TQ5399641825; 51°09′18″N 0°12′02″E		1243345	The Picture House More images	Q26536028
The Old Mill Adjacent to the Old Mill House	II	Poundsbridge Hill, Poundsbridge			16 January 1975	TQ5397641752; 51°09′16″N 0°12′01″E		1272924	Upload Photo	Q26562724
Old Swaylands	II*	Poundsbridge Lane			10 September 1954	TQ5340142600; 51°09′44″N 0°11′33″E		1273095	Upload Photo	Q17545868
Almshouses at Corner of Elliotts Farm Lane	II	1-4, Rogues Hill			16 January 1975	TQ5303743548; 51°10′15″N 0°11′16″E		1273096	Upload Photo	Q26562879
Redleaf Cottage	II	Redleaf Cottage Road			16 January 1975	TQ5250045143; 51°11′07″N 0°10′50″E		1272962	Upload Photo	Q26562757
Lilac Cottage and Cottages Adjacent on Either Side	II	Rogues Hill			16 January 1975	TQ5307143512; 51°10′13″N 0°11′17″E		1243019	Upload Photo	Q26535734
Elliotts House	II	Rogues Hill			16 January 1975	TQ5300643610; 51°10′17″N 0°11′14″E		1243020	Upload Photo	Q26535735
The Yews	II	Rogues Hill			10 September 1954	TQ5298343631; 51°10′17″N 0°11′13″E		1243021	Upload Photo	Q26535736
Bridge Over River Medway	II	Rogues Hill			16 January 1975	TQ5289943639; 51°10′18″N 0°11′09″E		1243023	Upload Photo	Q26535738
Rose Cottages	II	Rose Cottages, 1 and 2 Road, Poundsbridge			16 January 1975	TQ5413041693; 51°09′13″N 0°12′09″E		1243275	Upload Photo	Q26535959
Saints Hill Farmhouse	II	Saints Hill			16 January 1975	TQ5238241712; 51°09′16″N 0°10′39″E		1243024	Upload Photo	Q26535739
Salman's Farm Barn to North East of Salman's Farmhouse	II	Salman's Farm			13 March 1985	TQ5123643573; 51°10′17″N 0°09′43″E		1272506	Upload Photo	Q26562339
Range of Farm Buildings at West End of South Park Farmyard	II*	Smarts Hill, South Park			16 January 1975	TQ5226942711; 51°09′48″N 0°10′35″E		1243027	Upload Photo	Q17545545
South Park Farmhouse Including Attached Barn	II*	Smarts Hill, South Park			16 January 1975	TQ5230642680; 51°09′47″N 0°10′37″E		1243092	Upload Photo	Q17545565
Cartshed Adjoining Road to North of South Park Farmhouse	II*	Smarts Hill, South Park			16 January 1975	TQ5232242698; 51°09′48″N 0°10′38″E		1243096	Upload Photo	Q17545570
Walls to Dung Pit to North Side of South Park Farmyard	II	Smarts Hill, South Park			11 January 1991	TQ5230442699; 51°09′48″N 0°10′37″E		1244276	Upload Photo	Q26536905
Western Cartshed to North of South Park Farmhouse	II*	Smarts Hill, South Park			16 January 1975	TQ5231242699; 51°09′48″N 0°10′37″E		1272451	Upload Photo	Q17545801
South Lodge	II	South Lodge Road Park			16 January 1975	TQ5245445095; 51°11′05″N 0°10′48″E		1243266	Upload Photo	Q26535950
Church of St Peter	II	Spring Hill, Fordcombe			10 September 1954	TQ5254040353; 51°08′32″N 0°10′45″E		1243135	Upload Photo	Q26535836
Swaylands School	II	Swaylands School Road			16 January 1975	TQ5337343100; 51°10′00″N 0°11′32″E		1243018	Upload Photo	Q26535733
Number 5 Walter's Green Cottages	II	Walter's Green			16 January 1975	TQ5126740844; 51°08′49″N 0°09′40″E		1243279	Upload Photo	Q26535963
Yeomans Cottage	II	Walter's Green			16 January 1975	TQ5153541089; 51°08′56″N 0°09′55″E		1243280	Upload Photo	Q26535964
Number 6 Walter's Green Cottages	II	Walter's Green			16 January 1975	TQ5127140851; 51°08′49″N 0°09′41″E		1243350	Upload Photo	Q26680914
Walter's Green Farmhouse	II	Walter's Green			16 January 1975	TQ5131140888; 51°08′50″N 0°09′43″E		1243367	Upload Photo	Q26536048
Forge Cottage	II	Walter's Green			16 January 1975	TQ5150941103; 51°08′57″N 0°09′53″E		1243371	Upload Photo	Q26536052
Walter's Green Farm Cottage	II	Walter's Green			16 January 1975	TQ5137040932; 51°08′52″N 0°09′46″E		1272963	Upload Photo	Q26562758
Harts	II	Walter's Green			16 January 1975	TQ5160641434; 51°09′08″N 0°09′59″E		1272964	Upload Photo	Q26562759
1-4, Walter's Green	II	Walter's Green			27 March 1998	TQ5125740835; 51°08′48″N 0°09′40″E		1323727	Upload Photo	Q26609428
Old Surrenden	II	Walters Green Road			5 June 2014	TQ5129040855; 51°08′49″N 0°09′42″E		1418980	Upload Photo	Q26676690
Fountain to South of Hammertower	II	Hammertower Road			16 January 1975	TQ5235044338; 51°10′41″N 0°10′41″E		1272960	Upload Photo	Q26562755
The Spotted Dog Public House	II	Smarts Hill			16 January 1975	TQ5219041974; 51°09′24″N 0°10′30″E		1243025	The Spotted Dog Public House More images	Q26535740
Home Farm Cottage	II	Smarts Hill			16 January 1975	TQ5212842322; 51°09′36″N 0°10′27″E		1243026	Upload Photo	Q26535741
Bullpits	II	Smarts Hill			16 January 1975	TQ5223142469; 51°09′40″N 0°10′32″E		1243090	Upload Photo	Q26535797

== See also ==
- Grade I listed buildings in Kent
- Grade II* listed buildings in Kent

== Sources ==
- Newman, John (2012) [1969], Kent: West and the Weald, The Buildings of England, New Haven and London: Yale University Press, ISBN 978-0-300-18509-6
