= R. Durtnell & Sons =

English building company established 1591

Coordinates: 51°16′41″N 0°06′42″E

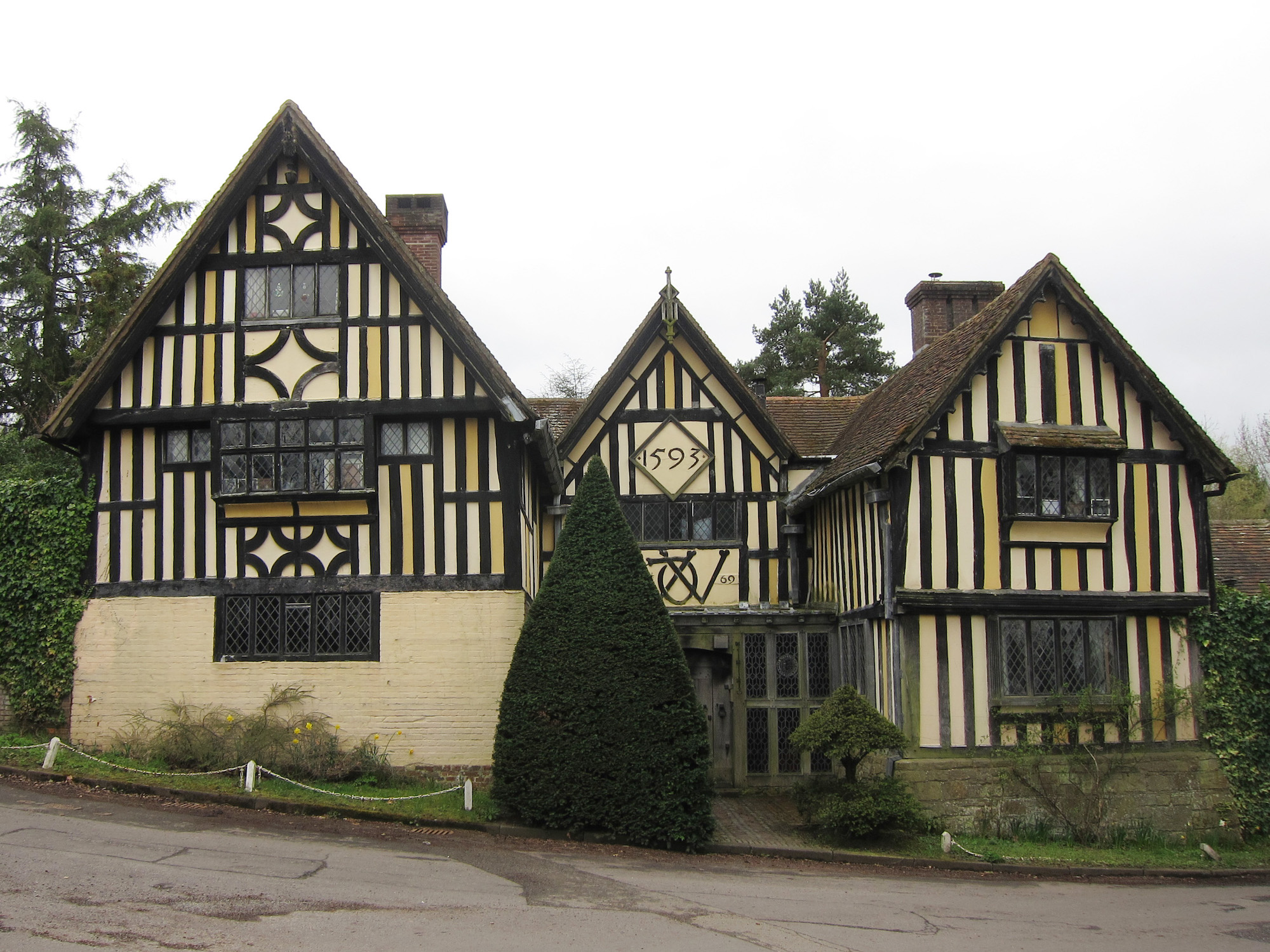
Poundsbridge Manor

Durtnell Limited is an English property company that has been continuously operated by the same family in Brasted, in the English county of Kent. The earliest recorded property the family built, Poundsbridge Manor (also called The Picture House), was completed in 1593, and it was the same family that restored the house following bomb damage in the Second World War.

== Durtnell family businesses ==
From as early as 1591 the Durtnell family's property interests (and since 1937 including Durtnell Limited) have been handed down over some thirteen generations to date. It was claimed to be the oldest builder in Britain. According to Dun & Bradstreet, the business information provider, it was "the third oldest company in the UK still in operation" – there were only two older companies in any sector in Britain with a continuous existence: Oxford University Press and Cambridge University Press. However, conflicting claims have also been made.

From about 1570 John Durtnall (Note: The name was variously spelt "Durtnell, "Durtnall", "Darkenoll" or "Dartnoll".) had been a "carpenter" (the name for a builder at that time) and master carpenter making timber-frame Wealden houses. He teamed up with his brother Brian to build a house for their father, William. The house, Poundsbridge Manor in Penshurst, Kent, was completed in 1593. Thus he became a housewright, employing carpenters and other craftsmen, purchasing the timber, stone, tiles and other building materials required. The seventh generation owner, Richard (1766 to 1845), is regarded as establishing the modern business. In the ninth generation the owner, also a Richard, set up a formal partnership with his two sons. To mark their quatercentenary, Hugh Barty-King wrote a book about the history of the firm, A country builder: The story of Richard Durtnell & Sons of Brasted 1591–1991.

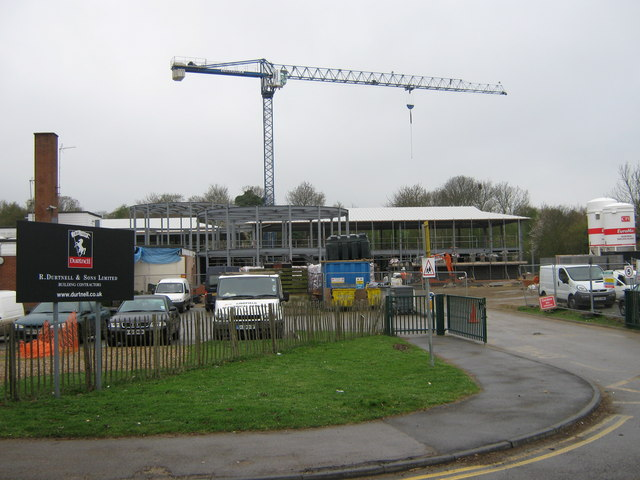
R. Durtnell & Sons remodelling of Rowhill School, Woodview Campus, in 2011

The business continued at its original location in Brasted, Kent, building luxury houses and doing specialist building, restoration and renovation of historic buildings over the south-east of England for customers such as local authorities, heritage organisations and churches. In 2014 the firm had a turnover of more than £50 million and more than 130 full-time staff.

In July 2019 R. Durtnell & Sons Limited ceased trading whilst working on a renovation project for the Brighton Corn Exchange.

In August 2019, creditors agreed to give R. Durtnell & Sons Limited more time to pay its debts under a debt repayment plan known as a company voluntary agreement (CVA).
