= Hartley, Sevenoaks =

Village in Kent, England

Coordinates: 51.386812°N 0.303691°E

Hartley
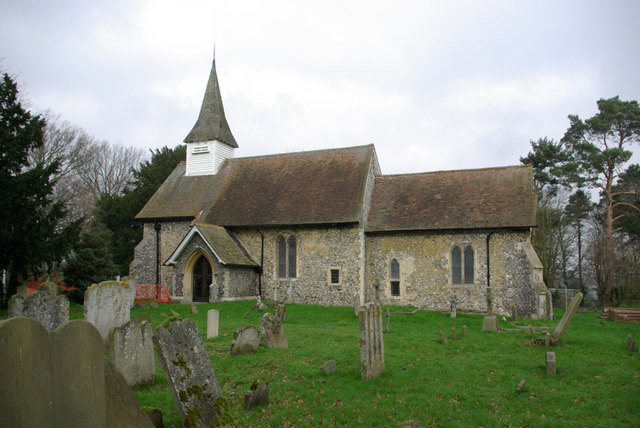
- All Saints Church

- Location within Kent
- Population: 5,359 (2011 Census)
- OS grid reference: TQ605675
- Civil parish: Hartley
- District: Sevenoaks
- Shire county: Kent
- Region: South East
- Country: England
- Sovereign state: United Kingdom
- Post town: LONGFIELD
- Postcode district: DA3
- Dialling code: 01474
- Police: Kent
- Fire: Kent
- Ambulance: South East Coast
- UK Parliament: Tonbridge
- Website: www.hartley-kent.org.uk

Hartley is a village and civil parish in the Sevenoaks district of Kent, England. It is located 7 miles (11 km) south west of Gravesend and the same distance south east of Dartford.

== History ==
The village of Hartley is recorded as Erclei in the Domesday Book of 1086, with a population of 15 families and 3 slaves. The name Hartley means "place in the wood where the deer are". The parish church of All Saints dates from the early 12th century, although it probably replaced an earlier Anglo-Saxon building.

On 28 January 1554, during Wyatt's Rebellion against Queen Mary, a rebel force of about 500 men led by Henry Isley clashed with a similar-sized loyal force led by Lord Abergavenny and Sir Robert Southwell, at Wrotham Hill. After a running battle over about four miles, the rebels made their last stand at Hartley Wood, where they were defeated.

By 1872, there were 47 houses in Hartley with a population of 244. Some local farms specialised in hop growing. A National School was built in the village in 1841; it was rebuilt in 1960 on a new site.

The opening nearby of Longfield railway station in 1872 began the evolution of the village from an agricultural to a commuter community. Just before World War I, two agricultural estates were purchased by a property developer and sold off in small plots for new houses and bungalows. In 1944 Government plans for a major London overspill town based on Hartley/Longfield/Meopham were developed, which ultimately came to nothing. However major housing developments at New Ash Green in the 1960s and Wellfield in the 1970s continued the trend.

The parish was part of Axstane Hundred and later Dartford Rural District until 1974, when it joined the new Sevenoaks District. Since 2024, it has been part of the parliamentary constituency of Tonbridge.

== Places of worship ==
All Saints Church, the Anglican parish church, is Grade I-listed and dates from the 12th century. It is supplemented by the All Saints Church Centre in the centre of the village, which is used as a church hall and for worship. St Francis de Sales' Roman Catholic church, a Grade II-listed building, is a 17th-century former barn with timber framing and a thatched roof. Hartley United Reformed Church (formerly Congregational) was registered for worship in 1936 but has closed and was put up for sale, before being demolished and turned into housing.

== Sports ==
Hartley Country Club cricket section were the Kent Cricket League Premier Champions in 2008, 2011–2013 and 2015. The Country Club also has sections for Tennis, Bowls, Pétanque, Squash and Junior Football.

== Transport ==
=== Rail ===
Hartley is served by Longfield railway station with Southeastern services to London Victoria via Bromley South, Ramsagate via Chatham and Dover Priory via Chatham and Canterbury East.

=== Buses ===
Hartley is served by the Arriva Kent Thameside route 489, previously also the 423 and 433. This connects with Gravesend.

== See also ==
- List of places of worship in Sevenoaks District
- Listed buildings in Hartley, Sevenoaks
