= Listed buildings in Fawkham =

Civil Parish in Kent, England

Fawkham is a village and civil parish in the Sevenoaks District of Kent, England. It contains one grade I and 12 grade II listed buildings that are recorded in the National Heritage List for England.

This list is based on the information retrieved online from Historic England.

== Key ==
Grade	Criteria
I	Buildings that are of exceptional interest
II*	Particularly important buildings of more than special interest
II	Buildings that are of special interest

== Listing ==
Name	Grade	Location	Type	Completed (Note: The date given is the date used by Historic England as significant for the initial building or that of an important part in the structure's description.)	Date designated	Grid ref. (Note: The grid reference is based on the British national grid reference system, sometimes known as OSGB36, used by the Ordnance Survey.) Geo-coordinates	Notes	Entry number (Note: The "List Entry Number" is a unique number assigned to each listed building and scheduled monument by Historic England.)	Image	Wikidata
Brands Hatch Place	II	Brands Hatch Road			23 April 1982	TQ5820364816; 51°21′37″N 0°16′15″E		1238312	Upload Photo	Q26531377
Church of Saint Mary	I	Fawkham Road			1 June 1967	TQ5970068047; 51°23′20″N 0°17′38″E		1238236	Church of Saint Mary More images	Q17529864
Fawkham Manor and A Pair of Gates to the West of the House	II	Longfield, DA3 8ND			26 November 2020	TQ5921366245; 51°22′23″N 0°17′10″E		1472809	Upload Photo	Q102704542
Gate Piers and Railings to North of Pennis House	II	Pennis Lane			22 October 1982	TQ5965567314; 51°22′57″N 0°17′34″E		1238237	Upload Photo	Q26531304
Pennis Farmhouse	II	Pennis Lane			22 October 1982	TQ5969867267; 51°22′55″N 0°17′36″E		1274297	Upload Photo	Q26563974
Pennis House	II	Pennis Lane			22 October 1982	TQ5966467272; 51°22′55″N 0°17′35″E		1274170	Upload Photo	Q26563856
White House Farmhouse	II	Speedgate Hill			22 October 1982	TQ5847365817; 51°22′09″N 0°16′31″E		1238473	Upload Photo	Q26531532
Gabriels	II	Sun Hill			22 October 1982	TQ5847765603; 51°22′03″N 0°16′31″E		1238238	Upload Photo	Q26531305
Court Lodge	II	Valley Road			1 June 1967	TQ5904366988; 51°22′47″N 0°17′02″E		1238239	Upload Photo	Q26531306
Cross House	II	Valley Road			22 October 1982	TQ5949567489; 51°23′03″N 0°17′26″E		1238493	Upload Photo	Q26531551
Fawkham War Memorial	II	Valley Road, Fawkham Green, DA3 8NS			21 April 2020	TQ5856065495; 51°21′59″N 0°16′35″E		1469601	Fawkham War Memorial More images	Q97457581
Scudders	II	Valley Road			1 June 1967	TQ5925267204; 51°22′54″N 0°17′13″E		1274298	Upload Photo	Q26563975
The Rectory	II	Valley Road			22 October 1982	TQ5948567611; 51°23′07″N 0°17′26″E		1238541	Upload Photo	Q26531594

== See also ==
- Grade I listed buildings in Kent
- Grade II* listed buildings in Kent

== Sources ==
- Newman, John (2012) [1969], Kent: West and the Weald, The Buildings of England, New Haven and London: Yale University Press, ISBN 978-0-300-18509-6
