= Listed buildings in Chiddingstone =

Historic structures in Kent, England

Chiddingstone is a village and civil parish in the Sevenoaks District of Kent, England. It contains ten grade II* and 95 grade II listed buildings that are recorded in the National Heritage List for England.

This list is based on the information retrieved online from Historic England.

== Key ==
Grade	Criteria
I	Buildings that are of exceptional interest
II*	Particularly important buildings of more than special interest
II	Buildings that are of special interest

== Listing ==
Name	Grade	Location	Type	Completed (Note: The date given is the date used by Historic England as significant for the initial building or that of an important part in the structure's description.)	Date designated	Grid ref. (Note: The grid reference is based on the British national grid reference system, sometimes known as OSGB36, used by the Ordnance Survey.) Geo-coordinates	Notes	Entry number (Note: The "List Entry Number" is a unique number assigned to each listed building and scheduled monument by Historic England.)	Image	Wikidata
Boar Place	II	Bough Beech			10 September 1954	TQ5060649018; 51°13′14″N 0°09′19″E		1085875	Upload Photo	Q26374696
Forge House at West Side of Entrance to Boar Place	II	Bough Beech			10 September 1954	TQ5060448461; 51°12′56″N 0°09′18″E		1085876	Upload Photo	Q26374701
Barn at Polebrook	II	Bough Beech			16 January 1975	TQ5056847695; 51°12′31″N 0°09′15″E		1085877	Upload Photo	Q26374706
Oast Group of Somerden	II	Bough Beech			16 January 1975	TQ5014846913; 51°12′06″N 0°08′52″E		1085878	Upload Photo	Q26374712
Hilders Farmhouse	II	Bough Beech			16 January 1975	TQ4895248362; 51°12′54″N 0°07′53″E		1085879	Upload Photo	Q26374716
The Rustles Just North of Railway	II	Bough Beech			16 January 1975	TQ4884546900; 51°12′07″N 0°07′45″E		1085880	Upload Photo	Q26374721
Harborough	II	Bough Beech			16 January 1975	TQ4843346963; 51°12′09″N 0°07′24″E		1085881	Upload Photo	Q26374727
Gravelpits House	II	Bough Beech			16 January 1975	TQ4884946515; 51°11′54″N 0°07′45″E		1085882	Upload Photo	Q26374731
Outbuilding Range on South East Side of Yard at Clouts Farm	II	Bough Beech			24 September 1984	TQ4890346984; 51°12′10″N 0°07′48″E		1244185	Upload Photo	Q26536817
Tithe Barn North and Tithe Barn South	II	Bough Beech			24 September 1984	TQ4888747004; 51°12′10″N 0°07′47″E		1244186	Upload Photo	Q26536818
Thirkells Barn	II	Bough Beech			7 July 1986	TQ4845146972; 51°12′10″N 0°07′25″E		1244191	Upload Photo	Q26536823
Barn Immediately South West of Cole's Farmhouse	II	Bough Beech			13 July 1988	TQ5036747358; 51°12′20″N 0°09′04″E		1244246	Upload Photo	Q26536875
Barn to North East of Hilders Farmhouse	II	Bough Beech			16 January 1975	TQ4896748385; 51°12′55″N 0°07′53″E		1252463	Upload Photo	Q26544328
The White House	II	Bough Beech			16 January 1975	TQ4866447003; 51°12′10″N 0°07′36″E		1252465	Upload Photo	Q26544330
Bough Beech Farmhouse	II	Bough Beech			16 January 1975	TQ4888446782; 51°12′03″N 0°07′47″E		1252466	Upload Photo	Q26544331
Toby Cottage	II	Bough Beech			29 March 1974	TQ4877446831; 51°12′05″N 0°07′41″E		1262257	Upload Photo	Q26553145
Barn to North West of Hilders	II	Bough Beech			2 September 1991	TQ4894448392; 51°12′55″N 0°07′52″E		1272453	Upload Photo	Q26562286
Outbuilding range on north east side of yard at Clouts Farm	II	Bough Beech			24 September 1984	TQ4890947003; 51°12′10″N 0°07′48″E		1272505	Upload Photo	Q26562338
Garden Walls to South of Boar Place	II	Bough Beech			16 January 1975	TQ5061948960; 51°13′12″N 0°09′19″E		1336414	Upload Photo	Q26620906
Hickens Cottage	II	Bough Beech			16 January 1975	TQ5031047858; 51°12′37″N 0°09′02″E		1336415	Upload Photo	Q26620907
Kilnhouse Farmhouse	II	Bough Beech			16 January 1975	TQ5001048247; 51°12′49″N 0°08′47″E		1336416	Upload Photo	Q26620908
Barn to West of Waterlake House	II	Bough Beech			16 January 1975	TQ4942646993; 51°12′09″N 0°08′15″E		1336417	Upload Photo	Q26620909
The Wheatsheaf Public House	II	Bough Beech			16 January 1975	TQ4882746798; 51°12′04″N 0°07′44″E		1336418	Upload Photo	Q26620910
The Barn and Attached Stable at Sharp's Place	II	Bough Beech			11 February 2000	TQ5131848772; 51°13′05″N 0°09′55″E		1380082	Upload Photo	Q26660298
Pilbeams	II	Bradley Road			10 September 1954	TQ5044240611; 51°08′42″N 0°08′58″E		1262249	Upload Photo	Q26553137
Hobbs Hill Farmhouse	II	Bradley Road			16 January 1975	TQ5010840754; 51°08′47″N 0°08′41″E		1336412	Upload Photo	Q26620904
Stonelake Farmhouse	II	Camp Hill			16 January 1975	TQ5186846789; 51°12′00″N 0°10′20″E		1336422	Upload Photo	Q26620914
The Cottage	II	Chiddingstone Causeway			16 January 1975	TQ5169546664; 51°11′57″N 0°10′11″E		1085887	Upload Photo	Q26374752
Horseshoes Cottage	II	Chiddingstone Causeway			16 January 1975	TQ5057746876; 51°12′05″N 0°09′14″E		1243029	Upload Photo	Q26535743
Chested House	II	Chiddingstone Causeway			16 January 1975	TQ5067546225; 51°11′43″N 0°09′18″E		1243030	Upload Photo	Q26535744
Little Chested	II	Chiddingstone Causeway			16 January 1975	TQ5066746397; 51°11′49″N 0°09′18″E		1243116	Upload Photo	Q26535819
Sandhole Cottages	II	Chiddingstone Causeway			16 January 1975	TQ5091246007; 51°11′36″N 0°09′30″E		1243119	Upload Photo	Q26535822
Church of St Luke	II*	Chiddingstone Causeway			10 September 1954	TQ5212246502; 51°11′51″N 0°10′33″E		1252482	Upload Photo	Q17545687
Becketts Farmhouse	II	Chiddingstone Causeway			16 January 1975	TQ5111146382; 51°11′48″N 0°09′41″E		1273055	Upload Photo	Q26562843
Jessops Farmhouse	II	Chiddingstone Causeway			16 January 1975	TQ5083846820; 51°12′02″N 0°09′27″E		1273097	Upload Photo	Q26562880
The Horseshoes	II	Chiddingstone Causeway			16 January 1975	TQ5060546861; 51°12′04″N 0°09′15″E		1273098	Upload Photo	Q26562881
Barn to West of Sandhole Cottages	II	Chiddingstone Causeway			16 January 1975	TQ5088846015; 51°11′36″N 0°09′29″E		1273099	Upload Photo	Q26562882
Castle Close the Courtyard	II	1 and 2, Chiddingstone Corner			16 January 1975	TQ4979145116; 51°11′08″N 0°08′31″E		1252492	Upload Photo	Q26544348
Wall and Former Stable to West of Chiddingstone Castle	II	Chiddingstone Corner			16 January 1975	TQ4979845141; 51°11′09″N 0°08′31″E		1085888	Wall and Former Stable to West of Chiddingstone Castle More images	Q26374758
Pumphouse Gazebo Orangery and Garden Wall Chiddingstone Castle	II*	Chiddingstone Corner			16 January 1975	TQ4978345062; 51°11′07″N 0°08′30″E		1085889	Pumphouse Gazebo Orangery and Garden Wall Chiddingstone Castle More images	Q17545447
Tye Hall	II	Chiddingstone Corner			16 January 1975	TQ4972245206; 51°11′11″N 0°08′28″E		1085890	Upload Photo	Q26374762
Old Gilwyns	II	Chiddingstone Corner			16 January 1975	TQ4976045417; 51°11′18″N 0°08′30″E		1085891	Upload Photo	Q26374767
Chiddingstone Castle	II*	Chiddingstone Corner			16 January 1975	TQ4983145126; 51°11′09″N 0°08′33″E		1252483	Chiddingstone Castle More images	Q5096598
Gilwyns	II	Chiddingstone Corner			16 January 1975	TQ4975645406; 51°11′18″N 0°08′30″E		1252493	Upload Photo	Q26544349
Forge Cottage	II	Chiddingstone Corner			16 January 1975	TQ4970645348; 51°11′16″N 0°08′27″E		1262231	Upload Photo	Q26553119
Walnut Tree Cross Farm	II	Chiddingstone Hoath			16 January 1975	TQ4892642728; 51°09′52″N 0°07′43″E		1085892	Upload Photo	Q26374773
Barn to South of Hoath House	II	Chiddingstone Hoath			16 January 1975	TQ4912442631; 51°09′49″N 0°07′53″E		1085893	Upload Photo	Q26374778
Brooker's Farmhouse	II	Chiddingstone Hoath			16 January 1975	TQ4981442406; 51°09′41″N 0°08′28″E		1085894	Upload Photo	Q26374784
Bassetts Mill	II	Chiddingstone Hoath			16 January 1975	TQ4969341362; 51°09′07″N 0°08′20″E		1085895	Upload Photo	Q26374788
Oakenden	II	Chiddingstone Hoath			16 January 1975	TQ5017242833; 51°09′54″N 0°08′47″E		1085896	Upload Photo	Q26374793
Skipreed	II	Chiddingstone Hoath			16 January 1975	TQ5022742954; 51°09′58″N 0°08′50″E		1085897	Upload Photo	Q26374799
Yew Tree Cottage	II	Chiddingstone Hoath			16 January 1975	TQ5050241962; 51°09′26″N 0°09′03″E		1085916	Upload Photo	Q26374891
Barn St Walnut Tree Cross Farm	II	Chiddingstone Hoath			22 May 1990	TQ4888442757; 51°09′53″N 0°07′41″E		1244256	Upload Photo	Q26536885
Hoath House	II	Chiddingstone Hoath			10 September 1954	TQ4912042665; 51°09′50″N 0°07′53″E		1262234	Upload Photo	Q26553122
Forest Cottage	II	Chiddingstone Hoath			16 January 1975	TQ4970642534; 51°09′45″N 0°08′23″E		1262236	Upload Photo	Q26553124
Barn to West of Frienden Farmhouse	II	Chiddingstone Hoath			9 February 1982	TQ5031541292; 51°09′04″N 0°08′52″E		1272504	Upload Photo	Q26562337
Woodgates	II*	Chiddingstone Hoath			16 January 1975	TQ5012042345; 51°09′38″N 0°08′44″E		1336423	Upload Photo	Q17545914
Small Barn to North West of Oakdenden	II	Chiddingstone Hoath			16 January 1975	TQ5015642828; 51°09′54″N 0°08′46″E		1336424	Upload Photo	Q26620915
Prinkham	II*	Coldharbour Road			10 September 1954	TQ4957941132; 51°09′00″N 0°08′14″E		1085873	Upload Photo	Q17545437
Piggott's Cottage	II	Cooper's Corner			16 January 1975	TQ4878649261; 51°13′23″N 0°07′45″E		1085898	Upload Photo	Q26374803
South View	II	Cooper's Corner			16 January 1975	TQ4880149504; 51°13′31″N 0°07′47″E		1336425	Upload Photo	Q26620916
Little Hale Cottages	II	Hale Oak Road			16 January 1975	TQ5188048375; 51°12′52″N 0°10′23″E		1085899	Upload Photo	Q26374808
Brownings Farmhouse	II	Hale Oak Road			16 January 1975	TQ5163647758; 51°12′32″N 0°10′10″E		1336426	Upload Photo	Q26620917
Sharp's Place	II	Hale Oak Road			16 January 1975	TQ5132848732; 51°13′04″N 0°09′56″E		1336427	Upload Photo	Q26620918
1, High Street	II*	1, High Street			10 September 1954	TQ5010945158; 51°11′09″N 0°08′47″E		1252472	1, High Street More images	Q17545671
2, High Street	II	2, High Street			10 September 1954	TQ5010145158; 51°11′09″N 0°08′47″E		1085884	2, High Street More images	Q26374743
The Post Office and Village Shop	II*	3, High Street			10 September 1954	TQ5008745157; 51°11′09″N 0°08′46″E		1252475	The Post Office and Village Shop More images	Q17545675
4, High Street	II*	4, High Street			10 September 1954	TQ5007045156; 51°11′09″N 0°08′45″E		1085885	4, High Street More images	Q17545442
6, High Street	II	6, High Street			10 September 1954	TQ5006445146; 51°11′09″N 0°08′45″E		1336421	Upload Photo	Q26620913
Mausoleum to East of South East Corner of Church of St Mary	II	High Street			16 January 1975	TQ5010645184; 51°11′10″N 0°08′47″E		1085883	Mausoleum to East of South East Corner of Church of St Mary More images	Q26374738
Outbuilding to Rear of Castle Inn	II	High Street			16 January 1975	TQ5005845106; 51°11′08″N 0°08′45″E		1085886	Upload Photo	Q26374748
Larkins Farmhouse	II	High Street			8 January 1986	TQ5058045205; 51°11′10″N 0°09′12″E		1244189	Upload Photo	Q26536821
The Old Rectory	II	High Street			10 September 1954	TQ5007845296; 51°11′14″N 0°08′46″E		1252471	Upload Photo	Q26544335
The Castle Inn	II*	High Street			10 September 1954	TQ5004245153; 51°11′09″N 0°08′44″E		1252477	The Castle Inn More images	Q17545679
Wall and Entrance Gate to Chiddingstone Castle	II	High Street			10 September 1954	TQ5003645162; 51°11′10″N 0°08′44″E		1252479	Wall and Entrance Gate to Chiddingstone Castle More images	Q26544340
Church of St Mary	II*	High Street			10 September 1954	TQ5008645193; 51°11′11″N 0°08′46″E		1262259	Church of St Mary More images	Q17545794
Barn and Attached Outbuildings at Larkins Farm	II	High Street			8 January 1986	TQ5060245207; 51°11′11″N 0°09′13″E		1272508	Upload Photo	Q26562341
Wall and Lych Gate Along South Boundary of Cemetery	II	High Street			16 January 1975	TQ5027545186; 51°11′10″N 0°08′56″E		1336419	Upload Photo	Q26620911
Wall and Lych Gate to South of Church of St Mary	II	High Street			16 January 1975	TQ5008345172; 51°11′10″N 0°08′46″E		1336420	Wall and Lych Gate to South of Church of St Mary More images	Q26620912
Withers	II	Hill Hoath			16 January 1975	TQ4975344668; 51°10′54″N 0°08′28″E		1085900	Upload Photo	Q26374813
Nos 50 and 51 (Former No 54)	II	Hill Hoath			16 January 1975	TQ4983344646; 51°10′53″N 0°08′32″E		1252530	Upload Photo	Q26544384
Granary to North West of Lockskinners Farmhouse	II	Hill Hoath			16 January 1975	TQ4900744366; 51°10′45″N 0°07′49″E		1262248	Upload Photo	Q26553136
Barn at Hill Hoath Farm	II	Hill Hoath			16 December 1986	TQ4986744589; 51°10′51″N 0°08′34″E		1272509	Upload Photo	Q26562342
Lockskinners Cottage Lockskinners Farmhouse	II	Hill Hoath			16 January 1975	TQ4901944356; 51°10′44″N 0°07′50″E		1336428	Upload Photo	Q26620919
The Rock Public House	II	Hoath Corner			16 January 1975	TQ4973043126; 51°10′04″N 0°08′25″E		1085901	Upload Photo	Q26374818
Cherry Cottage Spoke Shave	II	Hoath Corner			16 January 1975	TQ4972543098; 51°10′03″N 0°08′25″E		1085902	Upload Photo	Q26374823
Truggers Oast	II	Hoath Corner			9 December 1987	TQ4943543100; 51°10′03″N 0°08′10″E		1244199	Upload Photo	Q26536831
Barn to East of the Rock Public House	II	Hoath Corner			16 January 1975	TQ4974843128; 51°10′04″N 0°08′26″E		1252531	Upload Photo	Q26544385
Granary to South of Truggers Farmhouse	II	Hoath Corner			16 January 1975	TQ4937443041; 51°10′02″N 0°08′06″E		1252532	Upload Photo	Q26544386
Skinners House Cottages	II	Hoath Corner			10 September 1954	TQ4965343123; 51°10′04″N 0°08′21″E		1262209	Upload Photo	Q26553098
Truggers Farmhouse	II	Hoath Corner			16 January 1975	TQ4938643071; 51°10′03″N 0°08′07″E		1336429	Upload Photo	Q26620920
Oast Houses and Drying Shed to South of Larkins Farm	II	Larkins Farm			16 January 1975	TQ5056045135; 51°11′08″N 0°09′11″E		1243028	Upload Photo	Q26535742
Frienden Farm	II	Moat Lane			16 January 1975	TQ5043641315; 51°09′05″N 0°08′58″E		1336413	Upload Photo	Q26620905
Barn at Somerden Farm	II	Somerden			20 August 1985	TQ5017246926; 51°12′07″N 0°08′53″E		1244188	Upload Photo	Q26536820
Old Workhouse Cottages	II	1-3 Somerden Green			16 January 1975	TQ5035045892; 51°11′33″N 0°09′01″E		1336430	Upload Photo	Q26620921
72, Somerden Green	II	72, Somerden Green			16 January 1975	TQ5026845993; 51°11′36″N 0°08′57″E		1252533	Upload Photo	Q26544387
North Cottage	II	Somerden Green			16 January 1975	TQ5025346222; 51°11′44″N 0°08′56″E		1085903	Upload Photo	Q26374829
Vexour Farmhouse	II	Vexour			16 January 1975	TQ5120945333; 51°11′14″N 0°09′44″E		1243278	Upload Photo	Q26535962
Sorrel Cottage to East of Vexour Farmhouse	II	Vexour			16 January 1975	TQ5142045298; 51°11′13″N 0°09′55″E		1243349	Upload Photo	Q26536032
Wat Stock	II	Watstock Farm			16 January 1975	TQ5076943855; 51°10′27″N 0°09′19″E		1085904	Upload Photo	Q26374833
Brook Cottage	II	Wellers Town			16 January 1975	TQ5074744569; 51°10′50″N 0°09′19″E		1243281	Upload Photo	Q26535965
Chantlers	II	Wellers Town			16 January 1975	TQ5086644914; 51°11′01″N 0°09′26″E		1243375	Upload Photo	Q26536056
Former Smithy to Old Forge	II				21 May 1986	TQ4972945367; 51°11′17″N 0°08′28″E		1244190	Upload Photo	Q26536822
Chiddingstone Mill Barn	II				3 November 1987	TQ4961646036; 51°11′38″N 0°08′23″E		1272511	Upload Photo	Q26562344
Triangle Oast	II				16 January 1975	TQ5062345179; 51°11′10″N 0°09′14″E		1273053	Upload Photo	Q26562841

== See also ==
- Grade I listed buildings in Kent
- Grade II* listed buildings in Kent

== Sources ==
- Newman, John (2012) [1969], Kent: West and the Weald, The Buildings of England, New Haven and London: Yale University Press, ISBN 978-0-300-18509-6
