= Chevening, Kent =

Village in Kent, England

Coordinates: 51.293°N 0.140°E

Chevening
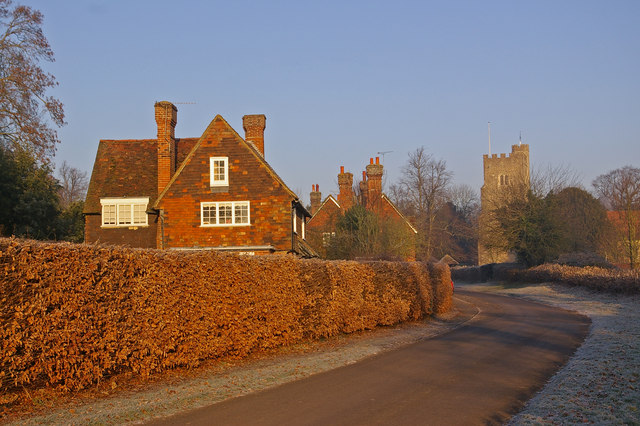
- Chevening

- Location within Kent
- Population: 3,092 (2011 Census)
- OS grid reference: TQ4857
- Civil parish: Chevening
- District: Sevenoaks
- Shire county: Kent
- Region: South East
- Country: England
- Sovereign state: United Kingdom
- Post town: SEVENOAKS
- Postcode district: TN14
- Dialling code: 01732
- Police: Kent
- Fire: Kent
- Ambulance: South East Coast
- UK Parliament: Sevenoaks

Chevening (/ˈtʃiːvnɪŋ/) is a village and civil parish in the Sevenoaks District of Kent, England. It was the location for the world's earliest known organised cricket match.

The parish is located to the north west of Sevenoaks on the southern slopes of the North Downs. The parish is a small one, being 6.5 miles (10.5 km) in length and 1 mile (1.6 km) wide. It had a population of 3,092 at the 2011 Census. Apart from the village the remaining area is rural. Chevening House is located here. The Pilgrims' Way crosses the parish. Close to Chevening, the path of Harold Godwinson's army en route to the Battle of Hastings in 1066, heading south along what is now Chipstead Lane, crosses William the Conqueror's route after the battle towards London along the Pilgrim's Way.

The village of Chevening is also small. It stands on the upper reaches of the River Darent. The village lies very close to the M25 motorway.

== Parish Church ==
The parish church is dedicated to St Botolph. It is within the diocese of Rochester, and the deanery of Shoreham. The church has an alabaster tomb to the lord of the manor, Sampson Lennard, and his wife Margaret, Lady Dacre. The church office, parish hall and rectory are located 1.3 miles distant from the parish church, on the outskirts of the village of Chipstead.

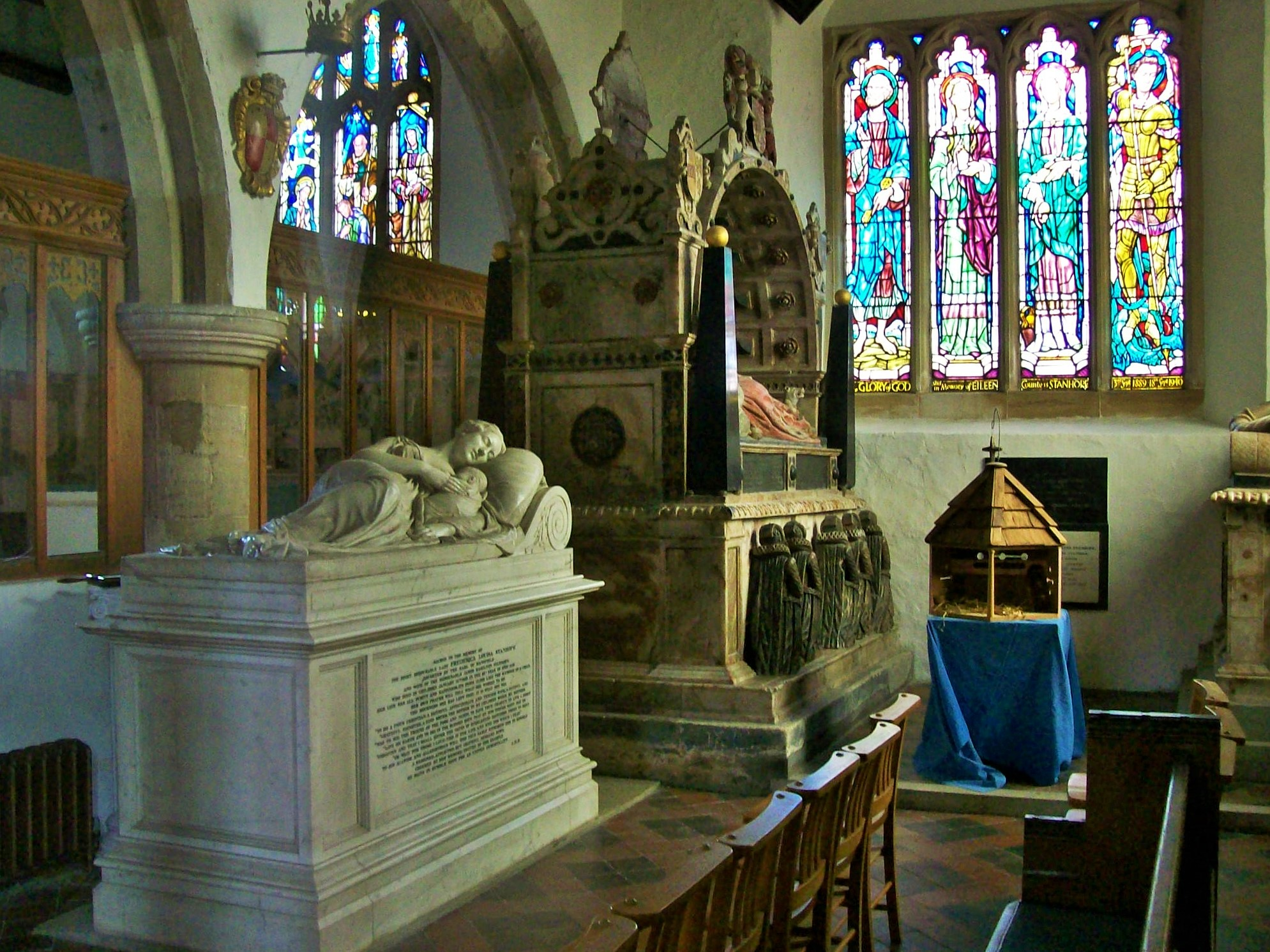
Stanhope Chapel at St Botolph's Parish Church

The Stanhope Chapel in the parish church of St Botolph is the traditional burial place of the Earls Stanhope.

The church is linked with Chevening (St Botolph's) Church of England Voluntary Aided Primary School, which is located 1 mile from the church, also in the village of Chipstead.

== Cricket ==
Chevening was the venue for the world's earliest known organised cricket match. The match can be deduced from a 1640 court case recording a "cricketing" of "Weald and Upland" against "Chalkhill" at Chevening "about thirty years since" (i.e. around 1611). The case concerned the land on which the game was played.

== Railway ==
Chevening was served by a halt on the Westerham Valley Branch Line running between Westerham and Dunton Green: the branch opened in 1881 but the halt at Chevening was not added until 1906 when steam railmotor services began on the line. Both line and halt closed in 1961.

== See also ==
- Listed buildings in Chevening, Kent
