= Listed buildings in Sevenoaks Weald =

Civil Parish in Kent, England

Sevenoaks Weald is a village and civil parish in the Sevenoaks District of Kent, England. It contains two grade II* and 19 grade II listed buildings that are recorded in the National Heritage List for England.

This list is based on the information retrieved online from Historic England.

== Key ==
| Grade | Criteria |
|---|---|
| I | Buildings that are of exceptional interest |
| II* | Particularly important buildings of more than special interest |
| II | Buildings that are of special interest |

== Listing ==
| Name | Grade | Location | Type | Completed (Note: The date given is the date used by Historic England as significant for the initial building or that of an important part in the structure's description.) | Date designated | Grid ref. (Note: The grid reference is based on the British national grid reference system, sometimes known as OSGB36, used by the Ordnance Survey.) Geo-coordinates | Notes | Entry number (Note: The "List Entry Number" is a unique number assigned to each listed building and scheduled monument by Historic England.) | Image | Wikidata |
|---|---|---|---|---|---|---|---|---|---|---|
| Hatchlands Farmhouse | II | Bayley's Hill, Hatchlands Farm | | | 16 January 1975 | TQ5127051227; 51°14′25″N 0°09′56″E | | 1243526 | Upload Photo | Q26536198 |
| Dale Farm Cottage | II | Church Road | | | 16 January 1975 | TQ5255051246; 51°14′24″N 0°11′02″E | | 1243533 | Upload Photo | Q26536205 |
| Hurst Farmhouse | II | Church Road | | | 16 January 1975 | TQ5287051038; 51°14′17″N 0°11′18″E | | 1243718 | Upload Photo | Q26536384 |
| Old Meads Sunnyside Cottage | II | Church Road | | | 27 November 1980 | TQ5280651081; 51°14′18″N 0°11′15″E | | 1272503 | Upload Photo | Q26562336 |
| Apple Trees | II | Egg Pie Lane, Fletcher's Green | | | 16 January 1975 | TQ5348150042; 51°13′44″N 0°11′48″E | | 1243531 | Upload Photo | Q26536203 |
| Church of St George | II | Glebe Road | | | 10 September 1954 | TQ5290051347; 51°14′27″N 0°11′21″E | | 1243722 | Church of St George More images | Q26536388 |
| The Old School House | II | Glebe Road | | | 16 January 1975 | TQ5295751327; 51°14′26″N 0°11′23″E | | 1243534 | Upload Photo | Q26536206 |
| Weald Place Lodge | II | Gracious Lane, Weald Place | | | 16 January 1975 | TQ5265152337; 51°14′59″N 0°11′09″E | | 1243713 | Upload Photo | Q26536379 |
| White House | II | Gracious Lane | | | 16 January 1975 | TQ5196752263; 51°14′57″N 0°10′34″E | | 1243528 | Upload Photo | Q26536200 |
| Brook Cottage | II | Halls Green | | | 16 January 1975 | TQ5267949579; 51°13′30″N 0°11′06″E | | 1272857 | Upload Photo | Q26562663 |
| Hale Oak Farmhouse | II | Halls Green, Hale Oak Farm | | | 16 January 1975 | TQ5199349061; 51°13′14″N 0°10′30″E | | 1243709 | Upload Photo | Q26536375 |
| The Cottage | II | Halls Green | | | 16 January 1975 | TQ5259249340; 51°13′22″N 0°11′02″E | | 1243527 | Upload Photo | Q26536199 |
| Anchor Cottages | II | 3 and 4, Hubbard's Hill | | | 16 January 1975 | TQ5273451805; 51°14′42″N 0°11′13″E | | 1243535 | Upload Photo | Q26536207 |
| Long Barn | II* | Long Barn Road | | | 10 September 1954 | TQ5264150571; 51°14′02″N 0°11′06″E | | 1272861 | Upload Photo | Q2204332 |
| Phoenix Cottage | II | Long Barn Road, Weald, TN14 6NH | | | 16 January 1975 | TQ5265850839; 51°14′11″N 0°11′07″E | | 1243723 | Upload Photo | Q26536389 |
| Else's Farmhouse | II | Morley's Road, Else's Farm | | | 16 January 1975 | TQ5355650866; 51°14′11″N 0°11′54″E | | 1243724 | Upload Photo | Q26536390 |
| Large Barn to North West of Else's Farmhouse and Further Range of Outbuildings Adjoining Barn to North West | II | Morley's Road, Else's Farm | | | 16 January 1975 | TQ5351450896; 51°14′12″N 0°11′51″E | | 1243536 | Upload Photo | Q26536208 |
| Riverhill House | II | Riverhill, Riverhill House | | | 16 January 1975 | TQ5425452040; 51°14′48″N 0°12′31″E | | 1243715 | Upload Photo | Q7338221 |
| The Old Farm | II | Scabharbour Road, Westwood | | | 16 January 1975 | TQ5289449500; 51°13′27″N 0°11′17″E | | 1272764 | Upload Photo | Q26562578 |
| Wickhurst Manor | II* | Wickhurst Road, Wickhurst Manor | | | 10 September 1954 | TQ5173751249; 51°14′25″N 0°10′20″E | | 1272858 | Wickhurst Manor More images | Q17545844 |
| Wentways | II | Windmill Road | | | 16 January 1975 | TQ5302850938; 51°14′14″N 0°11′26″E | | 1243726 | Upload Photo | Q26536392 |

== See also ==
- Grade I listed buildings in Kent
- Grade II* listed buildings in Kent

== Sources ==
- Newman, John (2012) [1969], Kent: West and the Weald, The Buildings of England, New Haven and London: Yale University Press, ISBN 978-0-300-18509-6
