= Listed buildings in Sevenoaks =

Civil Parish in Kent, England

Sevenoaks is a town and civil parish in the Sevenoaks District of Kent, England. It contains two grade I, twelve grade II* and 177 grade II listed buildings that are recorded in the National Heritage List for England.

This list is based on the information retrieved online from Historic England.

== Key ==
Grade	Criteria
I	Buildings that are of exceptional interest
II*	Particularly important buildings of more than special interest
II	Buildings that are of special interest

== Listing ==
Name	Grade	Location	Type	Completed (Note: The date given is the date used by Historic England as significant for the initial building or that of an important part in the structure's description.)	Date designated	Grid ref. (Note: Sometimes known as OSGB36, the grid reference is based on the British national grid reference system used by the Ordnance Survey.) Geo-coordinates	Notes	Entry number (Note: The "List Entry Number" is a unique number assigned to each listed building and scheduled monument by Historic England.)	Image	Wikidata
Cross Keys Cottage	II	1 And 2, Ashgrove Road			29 September 1972	TQ5215653609; 51°15′41″N 0°10′46″E		1086039	Upload Photo	Q26375466
West Heath School	II	Ashgrove Road			21 November 1997	TQ5268152902; 51°15′17″N 0°11′12″E		1031527	Upload Photo	Q99937496
The Black Boy Public House	II	13, Bank Street			29 September 1972	TQ5302054728; 51°16′16″N 0°11′32″E		1086040	The Black Boy Public House More images	Q26375471
2, Bank Street	II	2, Bank Street			29 September 1972	TQ5299554702; 51°16′15″N 0°11′31″E		1281419	Upload Photo	Q26570471
Bat and Ball Railway Station	II	Bat and Ball Road			24 July 1990	TQ5308656805; 51°17′23″N 0°11′39″E		1085975	Bat and Ball Railway Station More images	Q4868455
52 And 53, Bayham Road	II	52 and 53, Bayham Road			12 November 2001	TQ5370555826; 51°16′51″N 0°12′09″E		1389595	Upload Photo	Q26669030
54 And 55, Bayham Road	II	54 and 55, Bayham Road			12 November 2001	TQ5368355833; 51°16′51″N 0°12′08″E		1389596	Upload Photo	Q26669031
56 And 57, Bayham Road	II	56 and 57, Bayham Road			12 November 2001	TQ5366155841; 51°16′52″N 0°12′07″E		1389597	Upload Photo	Q26669032
Quaker's Hall	II	64, Bayham Road			29 September 1972	TQ5355055884; 51°16′53″N 0°12′01″E		1204007	Upload Photo	Q26499501
Seal Hollow House	II	Bayham Road			26 October 1973	TQ5366755695; 51°16′47″N 0°12′07″E		1240947	Upload Photo	Q26533842
Little Blackhall	II	Blackhall Lane			29 September 1972	TQ5426255400; 51°16′37″N 0°12′37″E		1086041	Upload Photo	Q26375475
Bradbourne Vale House	II	Bradbourne Road			29 September 1972	TQ5267656365; 51°17′09″N 0°11′17″E		1086042	Upload Photo	Q26375480
Vale Lodge	II	Bradbourne Road			29 September 1972	TQ5261956420; 51°17′11″N 0°11′14″E		1204016	Upload Photo	Q26499510
Bradbourne Farmhouse	II*	Bradbourne Vale Road			13 April 1951	TQ5223656377; 51°17′10″N 0°10′54″E		1086043	Upload Photo	Q17545475
Farm Buildings Adjoining Bradbourne Farmhouse	II	Bradbourne Vale Road			29 September 1972	TQ5219356417; 51°17′12″N 0°10′52″E		1281426	Upload Photo	Q26570478
The Oast House	II	Britain's Lane			29 September 1972	TQ5176855327; 51°16′37″N 0°10′28″E		1086001	Upload Photo	Q26375319
Britain's Farmhouse	II	Britain's Lane			13 April 1951	TQ5174355272; 51°16′35″N 0°10′27″E		1086044	Upload Photo	Q26375484
Farm Buildings Adjoining Britain's Farmhouse	II	Britain's Lane			29 September 1972	TQ5175355237; 51°16′34″N 0°10′27″E		1086045	Upload Photo	Q26375488
Lynch House	II	21, Clarendon Road			3 October 1986	TQ5250954824; 51°16′20″N 0°11′06″E		1085967	Upload Photo	Q26375151
Clenches Farm Barn	II	Clenches Farm Road			22 January 2003	TQ5231853985; 51°15′53″N 0°10′55″E		1392621	Upload Photo	Q26671833
The Clock House	II	Clock House Lane			29 September 1972	TQ5222656036; 51°16′59″N 0°10′53″E		1336356	Upload Photo	Q26620851
Seal House	II	37, Dartford Road			29 September 1972	TQ5306055411; 51°16′38″N 0°11′35″E		1086002	Upload Photo	Q26375324
Dentistry	II	6, Dartford Road			2 September 1998	TQ5314855538; 51°16′42″N 0°11′40″E		1376268	Upload Photo	Q26656882
The Vines Cricket Pavilion At Vine Cricket Ground	II	Dartford Road			13 April 1951	TQ5311655156; 51°16′30″N 0°11′38″E		1336357	Upload Photo	Q26620852
1 2 3, Dorset Street	II	1 2 3, Dorset Street			29 September 1972	TQ5300854700; 51°16′15″N 0°11′31″E		1086003	Upload Photo	Q26375330
4 And 5, Dorset Street	II	4 and 5, Dorset Street			29 September 1972	TQ5302354689; 51°16′15″N 0°11′32″E		1336358	Upload Photo	Q26620853
6 And 7, Dorset Street	II	6 and 7, Dorset Street			29 September 1972	TQ5303054693; 51°16′15″N 0°11′32″E		1086004	6 And 7, Dorset Street More images	Q26375335
8 And 8B, Dorset Street	II	8 and 8B, Dorset Street			29 September 1972	TQ5304054694; 51°16′15″N 0°11′33″E		1086005	8 And 8B, Dorset Street More images	Q26375339
Emily Jackson Hospital	II	Eardley Road			25 September 1989	TQ5257055184; 51°16′31″N 0°11′09″E		1085969	Upload Photo	Q26375162
5, Granville Road	II	5, Granville Road			27 July 1988	TQ5259054850; 51°16′21″N 0°11′10″E		1272469	Upload Photo	Q26562302
7, Granville Road	II	7, Granville Road			27 July 1988	TQ5257754867; 51°16′21″N 0°11′09″E		1244247	Upload Photo	Q26536876
Northdown	II	Grassy Lane			28 May 1998	TQ5281853589; 51°15′40″N 0°11′20″E		1119756	Upload Photo	Q26413050
The Kraftmeier Mausoleum, Greatness Cemetery	II	Greatness Cemetery			11 August 2003	TQ5388556980; 51°17′28″N 0°12′20″E		1392663	Upload Photo	Q26671872
Manor House Cottages	II	10, High Street			13 April 1951	TQ5316054333; 51°16′03″N 0°11′39″E		1336362	Manor House Cottages More images	Q26685000
100-106, High Street	II	100-106, High Street			29 September 1972	TQ5307254687; 51°16′15″N 0°11′35″E		1204287	Upload Photo	Q26499748
101, High Street	II	101, High Street			29 September 1972	TQ5304654699; 51°16′15″N 0°11′33″E		1085986	Upload Photo	Q26375249
103, High Street	II	103, High Street			29 September 1972	TQ5303954711; 51°16′16″N 0°11′33″E		1204395	103, High Street More images	Q26499843
12, High Street	II	12, High Street			13 April 1951	TQ5316254341; 51°16′04″N 0°11′39″E		1204224	12, High Street More images	Q26499694
124, High Street	II	124, High Street			29 September 1972	TQ5306154768; 51°16′17″N 0°11′34″E		1086015	Upload Photo	Q26375381
128, High Street	II	128, High Street			29 September 1972	TQ5307054787; 51°16′18″N 0°11′35″E		1204292	Upload Photo	Q26499753
13, High Street	II*	13, High Street			13 April 1951	TQ5312254215; 51°15′59″N 0°11′36″E		1086019	13, High Street More images	Q17545461
130 And 130A, High Street	II	130 and 130A, High Street			29 September 1972	TQ5306654794; 51°16′18″N 0°11′34″E		1336366	Upload Photo	Q26620860
132 And 134, High Street	II	132 and 134, High Street			29 September 1972	TQ5306354802; 51°16′19″N 0°11′34″E		1086016	Upload Photo	Q26375386
14 And 16, High Street	II	14 and 16, High Street			13 April 1951	TQ5316054356; 51°16′04″N 0°11′39″E		1086010	14 And 16, High Street More images	Q26375358
15, High Street	II*	15, High Street			13 April 1951	TQ5312654223; 51°16′00″N 0°11′37″E		1204347	15, High Street More images	Q17545500
No 165 Including Gateway And Railings	II	165, High Street			29 September 1972	TQ5304355035; 51°16′26″N 0°11′34″E		1204397	Upload Photo	Q26499844
17, High Street	II*	17, High Street			13 April 1951	TQ5312654231; 51°16′00″N 0°11′37″E		1086020	17, High Street More images	Q17545466
The Old House	II*	18, High Street			13 April 1951	TQ5315954372; 51°16′05″N 0°11′39″E		1204256	The Old House More images	Q17545491
19, 21 And 21A, High Street	II	19, 21 and 21A, High Street			13 April 1951	TQ5314154389; 51°16′05″N 0°11′38″E		1085978	19, 21 And 21A, High Street More images	Q26375207
2, High Street	II	2, High Street			29 September 1972	TQ5316054251; 51°16′01″N 0°11′38″E		1086008	2, High Street More images	Q26375349
20-24, High Street	II	20-24, High Street			13 April 1951	TQ5316054387; 51°16′05″N 0°11′39″E		1336363	20-24, High Street More images	Q26620857
23, High Street	II	23, High Street			13 April 1951	TQ5313954403; 51°16′06″N 0°11′38″E		1085979	23, High Street More images	Q26375213
25, High Street	II	25, High Street			13 April 1951	TQ5314154409; 51°16′06″N 0°11′38″E		1085980	25, High Street More images	Q26375217
26, High Street	II	26, High Street			29 September 1972	TQ5316554402; 51°16′06″N 0°11′39″E		1086011	26, High Street More images	Q26375362
27, High Street	II	27, High Street			13 April 1951	TQ5314254414; 51°16′06″N 0°11′38″E		1336385	Upload Photo	Q26620878
28 And 30, High Street	II	28 and 30, High Street			29 September 1972	TQ5316654412; 51°16′06″N 0°11′39″E		1281307	28 And 30, High Street More images	Q26570367
29, High Street	II	29, High Street			13 April 1951	TQ5314254419; 51°16′06″N 0°11′38″E		1085981	29, High Street More images	Q26375222
31-37, High Street	II	31-37, High Street			13 April 1951	TQ5314254425; 51°16′06″N 0°11′38″E		1085982	31-37, High Street More images	Q26375228
Park House	II	40-44, High Street			29 September 1972	TQ5315254462; 51°16′07″N 0°11′38″E		1086012	Park House More images	Q26375367
43 And 45, High Street	II	43 and 45, High Street			29 September 1972	TQ5312054463; 51°16′08″N 0°11′37″E		1336386	43 And 45, High Street More images	Q26620879
46, 48 And 48A, High Street	II	46, 48 and 48A, High Street			29 September 1972	TQ5314154475; 51°16′08″N 0°11′38″E		1336364	46, 48 And 48A, High Street More images	Q26620858
The Red House Including Entrance Gateway, Railings And Side Brick Walls To Forecourt	II*	50, High Street			13 April 1951	TQ5312854518; 51°16′09″N 0°11′37″E		1204275	The Red House Including Entrance Gateway, Railings And Side Brick Walls To Forecourt More images	Q17545495
57 And 59, High Street	II	57 and 59, High Street			29 September 1972	TQ5308954521; 51°16′09″N 0°11′35″E		1085983	57 And 59, High Street More images	Q26375233
The Manor House	II	6, High Street			13 April 1951	TQ5317454303; 51°16′02″N 0°11′39″E		1204214	The Manor House More images	Q26499684
63 And 65, High Street	II	63 and 65, High Street			13 April 1951	TQ5307554543; 51°16′10″N 0°11′34″E		1336387	63 And 65, High Street More images	Q26620880
National Westminster Bank	II	70, High Street			13 April 1951	TQ5310854580; 51°16′11″N 0°11′36″E		1086013	National Westminster Bank More images	Q26375372
7-11, High Street	II	7-11, High Street			13 April 1951	TQ5312354205; 51°15′59″N 0°11′36″E		1204331	7-11, High Street More images	Q26499789
The Chequers Inn	II	73, High Street			13 April 1951	TQ5306454600; 51°16′12″N 0°11′34″E		1085984	The Chequers Inn More images	Q26375238
75 And 75A, High Street	II	75 and 75A, High Street			29 September 1972	TQ5305854616; 51°16′13″N 0°11′34″E		1336388	75 And 75A, High Street More images	Q26620881
Manor House Cottages	II	8, High Street			29 September 1972	TQ5315854326; 51°16′03″N 0°11′38″E		1086009	Manor House Cottages More images	Q26375354
86, High Street	II	86, High Street			29 September 1972	TQ5309454636; 51°16′13″N 0°11′36″E		1281275	Upload Photo	Q26570336
88, High Street	II	88, High Street			1 June 1972	TQ5308454638; 51°16′13″N 0°11′35″E		1336365	Upload Photo	Q26620859
90 And 92, High Street	II	90 and 92, High Street			30 September 1969	TQ5308654648; 51°16′14″N 0°11′35″E		1086014	Upload Photo	Q26375376
99, High Street	II	99, High Street			29 September 1972	TQ5304754693; 51°16′15″N 0°11′33″E		1085985	Upload Photo	Q26375244
Almshouses	II*	High Street			13 April 1951	TQ5314654151; 51°15′57″N 0°11′38″E		1086007	Almshouses More images	Q17545456
The Royal Oak Tap	II	High Street			29 September 1972	TQ5312254159; 51°15′58″N 0°11′36″E		1086017	The Royal Oak Tap More images	Q26375391
The Royal Oak Hotel	II	High Street			13 April 1951	TQ5311654179; 51°15′58″N 0°11′36″E		1086018	The Royal Oak Hotel More images	Q26375395
Chantry House Including Entrance Gateway And Screen Wall To Courtyard	II*	High Street			13 April 1951	TQ5313054267; 51°16′01″N 0°11′37″E		1086021	Chantry House Including Entrance Gateway And Screen Wall To Courtyard	Q17545471
The Old Vicarage	II	High Street			13 April 1951	TQ5313054358; 51°16′04″N 0°11′37″E		1086022	The Old Vicarage More images	Q26375401
Archway Connecting To The Almshouses	II*	High Street			13 April 1951	TQ5316354174; 51°15′58″N 0°11′38″E		1204196	Upload Photo	Q17545481
Side Screen Walls Connecting The Almshouses	II*	High Street			13 April 1951	TQ5315554206; 51°15′59″N 0°11′38″E		1204209	Upload Photo	Q17545486
Church Of Saint Nicholas	II*	High Street			13 April 1951	TQ5311754311; 51°16′03″N 0°11′36″E		1204351	Church Of Saint Nicholas More images	Q17545505
Gates And Gate Piers And Section Of Wall To North Of Park Grange Lodge	II	High Street			24 June 1988	TQ5313254116; 51°15′56″N 0°11′37″E		1244219	Upload Photo	Q26536851
Park Grange Lodge	II	High Street			24 June 1988	TQ5312854105; 51°15′56″N 0°11′37″E		1244243	Upload Photo	Q26536872
K6 Telephone Kiosk At Junction With London Road	II	High Street			22 February 1989	TQ5307654591; 51°16′12″N 0°11′35″E		1272473	K6 Telephone Kiosk At Junction With London Road More images	Q26562306
Number 1, Oak End And Little Oak End	II	High Street			19 April 1951	TQ5312054141; 51°15′57″N 0°11′36″E		1281285	Number 1, Oak End And Little Oak End More images	Q26570345
Sevenoaks School	II*	High Street			13 April 1951	TQ5316854189; 51°15′59″N 0°11′39″E		1336360	Sevenoaks School More images	Q2275185
Claridge House	II	High Street			29 September 1972	TQ5317454270; 51°16′01″N 0°11′39″E		1336361	Claridge House More images	Q26620855
Bligh's Hotel	II	High Street			13 April 1951	TQ5303154831; 51°16′20″N 0°11′33″E		1336389	Upload Photo	Q26620882
Gas Lamp Standard Outside 17, Kippimgton Road	II	Kippimgton Road			5 May 1988	TQ5202055243; 51°16′34″N 0°10′41″E		1244205	Upload Photo	Q26536837
121, Kippington Road	II	121, Kippington Road			18 April 1990	TQ5263854122; 51°15′57″N 0°11′11″E		1272478	Upload Photo	Q26562311
134A, Kippington Road	II	134A, Kippington Road			24 July 1990	TQ5238854110; 51°15′57″N 0°10′58″E		1336384	Upload Photo	Q26620877
Blue Bonnets	II	138, Kippington Road			24 July 1990	TQ5245554089; 51°15′56″N 0°11′02″E		1085973	Upload Photo	Q26375185
Three Elms	II	142, Kippington Road			24 July 1990	TQ5255554076; 51°15′56″N 0°11′07″E		1085974	Upload Photo	Q26375188
The Lodge	II	88, Kippington Road			2 February 1990	TQ5210654697; 51°16′16″N 0°10′45″E		1336383	Upload Photo	Q26620876
Garage And Garage Flat	II	Kippington Road			2 February 1990	TQ5202654687; 51°16′16″N 0°10′41″E		1085970	Upload Photo	Q26375168
Gate Piers And Attached Garden Wall In Front Of No 88	II	Kippington Road			2 February 1990	TQ5211554695; 51°16′16″N 0°10′45″E		1085971	Upload Photo	Q26375174
Kippington House Old Folks' Home And Coach Building To North West	II	Kippington Road			13 April 1951	TQ5224154343; 51°16′04″N 0°10′51″E		1085987	Upload Photo	Q26375255
Gas Lamp Standard Opposite No 14	II	Kippington Road			5 May 1988	TQ5198755359; 51°16′38″N 0°10′40″E		1244204	Upload Photo	Q26536836
Gas Lamp Standard Outside No 29	II	Kippington Road			5 May 1988	TQ5203355106; 51°16′29″N 0°10′42″E		1244206	Upload Photo	Q26536838
Gas Lamp Standard Opposite No 47 (Tylers)	II	Kippington Road			5 May 1988	TQ5209454840; 51°16′21″N 0°10′44″E		1244207	Upload Photo	Q26536839
Gas Lamp Standard Opposite No 110 (Sharstead)	II	Kippington Road			5 May 1988	TQ5211354508; 51°16′10″N 0°10′45″E		1244208	Upload Photo	Q26536840
Gas Lamp Standard Opposite No 75 (Ardsheal)	II	Kippington Road			5 May 1988	TQ5227454373; 51°16′05″N 0°10′53″E		1244209	Upload Photo	Q26536841
Gas Lamp Standard Opposite No 132	II	Kippington Road			5 May 1988	TQ5235354155; 51°15′58″N 0°10′57″E		1244210	Upload Photo	Q26536842
Gas Lamp Standard Opposite Churchill Court	II	Kippington Road			5 May 1988	TQ5211254675; 51°16′15″N 0°10′45″E		1244233	Upload Photo	Q26536862
Gas Lamp Standard Opposite No 112 (Little Farnaby)	II	Kippington Road			5 May 1988	TQ5216754435; 51°16′08″N 0°10′47″E		1244234	Upload Photo	Q26536863
Gas Lamp Standard Opposite No 79 (Highcroft)	II	Kippington Road			5 May 1988	TQ5229854336; 51°16′04″N 0°10′54″E		1244235	Upload Photo	Q26536864
Gas Lamp Standard Near No 113	II	Kippington Road			5 May 1988	TQ5251854106; 51°15′57″N 0°11′05″E		1244236	Upload Photo	Q26536865
Church Of St Mary	II	Kippington Road			18 April 1990	TQ5215554596; 51°16′13″N 0°10′47″E		1244255	Upload Photo	Q26536884
War Memorial	II	Kippington Road			18 April 1990	TQ5212554593; 51°16′13″N 0°10′46″E		1244261	Upload Photo	Q26536890
Gas Lamp Standard Opposite Hunters Moon	II	Kippington Road			5 May 1988	TQ5208254905; 51°16′23″N 0°10′44″E		1272488	Upload Photo	Q26562321
Gas Lamp Standard Opposite Church Hall	II	Kippington Road			5 May 1988	TQ5212154636; 51°16′14″N 0°10′45″E		1272496	Upload Photo	Q26562329
Gas Lamp Standard Outside No 28 (Braeside)	II	Kippington Road			5 May 1988	TQ5199455162; 51°16′31″N 0°10′40″E		1272497	Upload Photo	Q26562330
Gas Lamp Standard Opposite No 50	II	Kippington Road			5 May 1988	TQ5202854989; 51°16′26″N 0°10′41″E		1272498	Upload Photo	Q26562331
Gas Lamp Standard Opposite No 53 High Beech	II	Kippington Road			5 May 1988	TQ5211854724; 51°16′17″N 0°10′45″E		1272499	Upload Photo	Q26562332
Gas Lamp Opposite No 87	II	Kippington Road			5 May 1988	TQ5231554251; 51°16′01″N 0°10′55″E		1272500	Gas Lamp Opposite No 87 More images	Q26562333
Gas Lamp Standard Opposite No 117 (Greendale)	II	Kippington Road			5 May 1988	TQ5256954105; 51°15′56″N 0°11′08″E		1272501	Upload Photo	Q26562334
Churchill Court Including Terrace Walls	II	Kippington Road			2 February 1990	TQ5204654631; 51°16′14″N 0°10′42″E		1336382	Upload Photo	Q26620875
Knole	I	Knole Park			14 April 1951	TQ5396854190; 51°15′58″N 0°12′20″E		1336390	Knole More images	Q1285144
Main Lodge Entrance	II	Knole Park			13 April 1951	TQ5340854286; 51°16′02″N 0°11′51″E		1336391	Main Lodge Entrance More images	Q26620883
Park Boundary Wall At Knole	II	Knole Park			29 September 1972	TQ5367755336; 51°16′35″N 0°12′07″E		1085988	Upload Photo	Q26375258
The Bird House	II	Knole Park			13 April 1951	TQ5436853978; 51°15′51″N 0°12′40″E		1085989	The Bird House More images	Q26375263
Garden Walls Adjoining Knole	I	Knole Park			13 April 1951	TQ5382754067; 51°15′54″N 0°12′12″E		1204403	Garden Walls Adjoining Knole More images	Q17529845
Plymouth Lodge, Entrance Gateway And Screen Walls	II	Knole Park			13 April 1951	TQ5346455243; 51°16′32″N 0°11′56″E		1204408	Upload Photo	Q26499853
Park Keeper's House	II	Knole Park			29 September 1972	TQ5504453659; 51°15′40″N 0°13′15″E		1281220	Upload Photo	Q26570285
Gardener's Cottage And Walls, Kitchen Garden	II	Knole Park			29 September 1972	TQ5440853810; 51°15′45″N 0°12′42″E		1085990	Upload Photo	Q26375268
21-27, Lime Tree Walk, 2-40, Lime Tree Walk	II	21-27, Lime Tree Walk, 2-40, Lime Tree Walk			29 September 1972	TQ5286654751; 51°16′17″N 0°11′24″E		1281228	Upload Photo	Q26570293
Lime Tree Cottages	II	29 And 31, Lime Tree Walk			6 March 1979	TQ5282454723; 51°16′16″N 0°11′22″E		1240950	Upload Photo	Q26533845
10, London Road	II	10, London Road			29 September 1972	TQ5303754633; 51°16′13″N 0°11′33″E		1204434	Upload Photo	Q26499879
125, London Road	II	125, London Road			3 July 2001	TQ5270455070; 51°16′28″N 0°11′16″E		1245938	Upload Photo	Q26538404
Nos 141 To 151 Including Stone Retaining Wall At Front	II	141-151, London Road			29 September 1972	TQ5265055128; 51°16′29″N 0°11′13″E		1204497	Upload Photo	Q26499938
20, London Road	II	20, London Road			29 September 1972	TQ5302454659; 51°16′14″N 0°11′32″E		1336353	20, London Road More images	Q26620848
21-25, London Road	II	21-25, London Road			29 September 1972	TQ5298554667; 51°16′14″N 0°11′30″E		1085993	21-25, London Road More images	Q26375284
27, London Road	II	27, London Road			29 September 1972	TQ5297854678; 51°16′15″N 0°11′30″E		1085994	27, London Road More images	Q26375288
28 And 30, London Road	II	28 and 30, London Road			29 September 1972	TQ5298654702; 51°16′15″N 0°11′30″E		1281193	Upload Photo	Q26570262
40 And 42, London Road	II	40 and 42, London Road			29 September 1972	TQ5297554723; 51°16′16″N 0°11′30″E		1085992	40 And 42, London Road More images	Q26375278
45, London Road	II	45, London Road			29 September 1972	TQ5294054732; 51°16′16″N 0°11′28″E		1336355	Upload Photo	Q26620850
48, London Road	II	48, London Road			29 September 1972	TQ5294254770; 51°16′18″N 0°11′28″E		1204453	Upload Photo	Q26499895
No 49 Including Front Railings And Gateways	II	49, London Road			13 April 1951	TQ5292954747; 51°16′17″N 0°11′27″E		1204479	Upload Photo	Q26499918
6, London Road	II	6, London Road			13 April 1951	TQ5304454612; 51°16′12″N 0°11′33″E		1336352	6, London Road More images	Q26620847
73-77, London Road	II	73-77, London Road			29 September 1972	TQ5286054869; 51°16′21″N 0°11′24″E		1085995	Upload Photo	Q26375293
79, London Road	II	79, London Road			6 October 1971	TQ5285454876; 51°16′21″N 0°11′24″E		1085996	Upload Photo	Q26375297
8, London Road	II	8, London Road			13 April 1951	TQ5304154623; 51°16′13″N 0°11′33″E		1085991	8, London Road More images	Q26375273
81, London Road	II	81, London Road			29 September 1972	TQ5285354884; 51°16′21″N 0°11′24″E		1204490	Upload Photo	Q26499929
83-93, London Road	II	83-93, London Road			29 September 1972	TQ5285054889; 51°16′22″N 0°11′23″E		1085997	Upload Photo	Q26375304
Stables Adjoining To The East Of No 41	II	London Road			29 September 1972	TQ5291854714; 51°16′16″N 0°11′27″E		1281212	Upload Photo	Q26570279
Lady Boswell's School	II	London Road			13 April 1951	TQ5296254750; 51°16′17″N 0°11′29″E		1336354	Lady Boswell's School More images	Q26620849
1-3, Oak Square	II	1-3, Oak Square			29 September 1972	TQ5310054207; 51°15′59″N 0°11′35″E		1085999	1-3, Oak Square More images	Q26375308
50, Oakhill Road	II	50, Oakhill Road			6 June 2002	TQ5222554813; 51°16′20″N 0°10′51″E		1061356	Upload Photo	Q26314553
St Mary's Gatehouse Including Attached Steps, Seat, Lamp, Drinking Fountain And Letterbox	II	64, Oakhill Road			18 April 1990	TQ5229254583; 51°16′12″N 0°10′54″E		1272475	Upload Photo	Q26562308
Gas Lamp Standard Outside No 83 (Glade House)	II	Oakhill Road			5 May 1988	TQ5250054379; 51°16′05″N 0°11′05″E		1244211	Upload Photo	Q26536843
Gas Lamp Standard Opposite No 104	II	Oakhill Road			5 May 1988	TQ5243454295; 51°16′03″N 0°11′01″E		1244212	Upload Photo	Q26536844
Gas Lamp Standard Opposite Nos 58 And 60	II	Oakhill Road			5 May 1988	TQ5229154674; 51°16′15″N 0°10′54″E		1244213	Upload Photo	Q26536845
Gas Lamp Standard Opposite Medlars	II	Oakhill Road			5 May 1988	TQ5223155059; 51°16′28″N 0°10′52″E		1244214	Upload Photo	Q26536846
Gas Lamp Standard Opposite No 10 (Les Arbres)	II	Oakhill Road			5 May 1988	TQ5197655432; 51°16′40″N 0°10′39″E		1244215	Upload Photo	Q26536847
Gas Lamp Standard Outside No 2 (Orchard House)	II	Oakhill Road			5 May 1988	TQ5216555367; 51°16′38″N 0°10′49″E		1244216	Upload Photo	Q26536848
Gas Lamp Standard Outside No 118 (Jumpers Hatch)	II	Oakhill Road			5 May 1988	TQ5260654352; 51°16′04″N 0°11′10″E		1244237	Upload Photo	Q26536866
Gas Lamp Standard Opposite Midway	II	Oakhill Road			5 May 1988	TQ5264254256; 51°16′01″N 0°11′12″E		1244238	Upload Photo	Q26536867
Gas Lamp Standard Opposite No 40	II	Oakhill Road			5 May 1988	TQ5223454943; 51°16′24″N 0°10′52″E		1244239	Upload Photo	Q26536868
Gas Lamp Standard Opposite No 16	II	Oakhill Road			5 May 1988	TQ5221155208; 51°16′32″N 0°10′51″E		1244240	Upload Photo	Q26536869
Gas Lamp Standard By Path To Sevenoaks Station	II	Oakhill Road			5 May 1988	TQ5222055326; 51°16′36″N 0°10′52″E		1244241	Upload Photo	Q26536870
Gas Lamp Standard Opposite No 46	II	Oakhill Road			5 May 1988	TQ5224154861; 51°16′21″N 0°10′52″E		1272479	Upload Photo	Q26562312
Gas Lamp Standard Near The Birches	II	Oakhill Road			5 May 1988	TQ5225655081; 51°16′28″N 0°10′53″E		1272480	Upload Photo	Q26562313
Gas Lamp Standard Outside Tall Firs	II	Oakhill Road			5 May 1988	TQ5264454266; 51°16′02″N 0°11′12″E		1272489	Upload Photo	Q26562322
Gas Lamp Standard Opposite No 80	II	Oakhill Road			5 May 1988	TQ5237754505; 51°16′10″N 0°10′58″E		1272490	Upload Photo	Q26562323
Gas Lamp Standard Near No 65 And Edge Of Recreation Ground	II	Oakhill Road			5 May 1988	TQ5248054458; 51°16′08″N 0°11′04″E		1272502	Upload Photo	Q26562335
Vine House	II	1, Park Lane			13 April 1951	TQ5319755305; 51°16′35″N 0°11′42″E		1281185	Upload Photo	Q26570254
Mount Hermon	II	2, Park Lane			29 September 1972	TQ5325055382; 51°16′37″N 0°11′45″E		1085959	Upload Photo	Q26375107
3, Park Lane	II	3, Park Lane			13 April 1951	TQ5320255328; 51°16′35″N 0°11′42″E		1085958	Upload Photo	Q26375102
Garden Wall And Railings At Vine House	II	Park Lane			29 September 1972	TQ5317855326; 51°16′35″N 0°11′41″E		1086000	Upload Photo	Q26375313
Granite Column In Rear Garden Of Number 5	II	Pontoise Close			7 January 1986	TQ5182556129; 51°17′03″N 0°10′32″E		1336380	Upload Photo	Q26620873
St Botolph's Corner	II	1, Pound Lane			29 September 1972	TQ5302055325; 51°16′35″N 0°11′33″E		1336375	Upload Photo	Q26620868
Holly Lodge Ingleside	II	3, Pound Lane			29 September 1972	TQ5301555363; 51°16′37″N 0°11′33″E		1085960	Upload Photo	Q26375113
Vine View	II	9, Pound Lane			29 September 1972	TQ5302055391; 51°16′38″N 0°11′33″E		1336376	Upload Photo	Q26620869
Quakers Hall Cottage	II	Quakers Hall Road			29 September 1972	TQ5350255922; 51°16′54″N 0°11′59″E		1085961	Upload Photo	Q26375118
Gas Lamp Standard Situated Approximately 1 Metre North Of North West Most Corner Of Churchyard	II	Rectory Lane			26 March 1987	TQ5307754337; 51°16′03″N 0°11′34″E		1336381	Upload Photo	Q26620874
1 And 2, Six Bells Lane	II	1 and 2, Six Bells Lane			29 September 1972	TQ5313054435; 51°16′07″N 0°11′37″E		1336377	1 And 2, Six Bells Lane More images	Q26620870
10 And 11, Six Bells Lane	II	10 and 11, Six Bells Lane			29 September 1972	TQ5309854421; 51°16′06″N 0°11′35″E		1336379	Upload Photo	Q26620872
12-16 Six Bells Lane, Including Gas Lamp Bracket With Lantern (Attached)	II	12-16 Six Bells Lane			29 September 1972	TQ5308654423; 51°16′06″N 0°11′35″E		1085965	Upload Photo	Q26375140
3, Six Bells Lane	II	3, Six Bells Lane			29 September 1972	TQ5312354435; 51°16′07″N 0°11′37″E		1085963	3, Six Bells Lane More images	Q26375130
4, Six Bells Lane	II	4, Six Bells Lane			29 September 1972	TQ5312354431; 51°16′06″N 0°11′37″E		1336378	Upload Photo	Q26620871
8, Six Bells Lane	II	8, Six Bells Lane			29 September 1972	TQ5311554427; 51°16′06″N 0°11′36″E		1085964	Upload Photo	Q26375135
128-134, St Johns Hill	II	128-134, St Johns Hill			14 January 1974	TQ5318756550; 51°17′15″N 0°11′43″E		1240949	Upload Photo	Q26533844
The Firs	II	3 And 3A, St Johns Hill			13 April 1951	TQ5313356083; 51°17′00″N 0°11′40″E		1085962	Upload Photo	Q26375124
The Retreat Almshouses	II	1 And 2, The Drive			29 September 1972	TQ5302755077; 51°16′27″N 0°11′33″E		1336359	Upload Photo	Q26684998
The Retreat Almshouses	II	3-8, The Drive			29 September 1972	TQ5302255078; 51°16′28″N 0°11′33″E		1086006	Upload Photo	Q26375344
No 15 Including Wall, Gate Posts And Gate To Front And Terrace To Rear	II	The Drive			14 November 1990	TQ5289255098; 51°16′28″N 0°11′26″E		1085976	Upload Photo	Q26375195
War Memorial	II	The Vine			3 August 2005	TQ5304555277; 51°16′34″N 0°11′34″E		1393141	Upload Photo	Q26688557
The White Hart Public House	II	Tonbridge Road			13 April 1951	TQ5352952938; 51°15′18″N 0°11′55″E		1085966	Upload Photo	Q26375146
Whyteladies	II	Wildernesse Avenue			12 June 1990	TQ5444956058; 51°16′58″N 0°12′48″E		1085972	Upload Photo	Q26375179
Kent Cottage	II	Wildernesse Mount			27 March 1991	TQ5395956351; 51°17′08″N 0°12′23″E		1085977	Upload Photo	Q26375201

== See also ==
- Grade I listed buildings in Kent
- Grade II* listed buildings in Kent

== Sources ==
- Newman, John (2012) [1969], Kent: West and the Weald, The Buildings of England, New Haven and London: Yale University Press, ISBN 978-0-300-18509-6
