= Listed buildings in Chevening, Kent =

Civil Parish in Kent, England

Chevening is a village and civil parish in the Sevenoaks District of Kent, England. It contains two grade I, two grade II* and 68 grade II listed buildings that are recorded in the National Heritage List for England.

This list is based on the information retrieved online from Historic England.

== Key ==
Grade	Criteria
I	Buildings that are of exceptional interest
II*	Particularly important buildings of more than special interest
II	Buildings that are of special interest

== Listing ==
Name	Grade	Location	Type	Completed (Note: The date given is the date used by Historic England as significant for the initial building or that of an important part in the structure's description.)	Date designated	Grid ref. (Note: The grid reference is based on the British national grid reference system, sometimes known as OSGB36, used by the Ordnance Survey.) Geo-coordinates	Notes	Entry number (Note: The "List Entry Number" is a unique number assigned to each listed building and scheduled monument by Historic England.)	Image	Wikidata
K6 Telephone Kiosk Opposite St Botolph's Church	II				11 January 1989	TQ4888957656; 51°17′55″N 0°08′03″E		1244250	Upload Photo	Q26536879
Garden Walls to West and South of Southdown House	II	Bessels Green			16 January 1975	TQ5068355499; 51°16′43″N 0°09′33″E		1085848	Upload Photo	Q26374562
Glencot	II	Bessels Green			16 January 1975	TQ5071555539; 51°16′45″N 0°09′34″E		1262349	Upload Photo	Q26553230
Park Place Cottages	II	1-9, Bessels Green			16 January 1975	TQ5071755542; 51°16′45″N 0°09′34″E		1085846	Upload Photo	Q26374551
Southdown Cottage	II	Bessels Green			10 September 1954	TQ5071155506; 51°16′44″N 0°09′34″E		1085849	Upload Photo	Q26374567
Southdown House	II	Bessels Green			10 September 1954	TQ5070455498; 51°16′43″N 0°09′34″E		1252262	Upload Photo	Q26544146
Tanners Cottage Yew Tree Cottage	II	Bessels Green			16 January 1975	TQ5071255534; 51°16′44″N 0°09′34″E		1085847	Upload Photo	Q26374556
Bessels Cottage Heath Cottage	II	Bessels Green Road, Bessels Green			10 September 1954	TQ5062555500; 51°16′43″N 0°09′30″E		1252267	Upload Photo	Q26544151
Bessels House	II	Bessels Green Road, Bessels Green			10 September 1954	TQ5066655468; 51°16′42″N 0°09′32″E		1085851	Upload Photo	Q26374578
Dormers and Dormers Cottage	II	Bessels Green Road, Bessels Green, TN13 2PT			16 January 1975	TQ5061955519; 51°16′44″N 0°09′29″E		1085850	Upload Photo	Q26374573
Manse the Baptist Church	II	Bessels Green Road, Bessels Green			10 September 1954	TQ5066855458; 51°16′42″N 0°09′32″E		1252270	Manse the Baptist Church More images	Q26544154
The King's Head Public House	II	Bessels Green Road, Bessels Green			16 January 1975	TQ5059055535; 51°16′45″N 0°09′28″E		1262352	Upload Photo	Q26553233
Apple Store to South of Walled Garden	II	Chevening House			14 July 1988	TQ4843157671; 51°17′56″N 0°07′40″E		1272468	Upload Photo	Q26562301
Bee House in Walled Garden	II*	Chevening House			14 July 1988	TQ4834057740; 51°17′58″N 0°07′35″E		1244221	Upload Photo	Q17545664
Chevening House	I	Chevening House			10 September 1954	TQ4870857667; 51°17′55″N 0°07′54″E		1085853	Chevening House More images	Q1070927
Garden Cottage	II	Chevening House			14 July 1988	TQ4852157732; 51°17′58″N 0°07′44″E		1244244	Upload Photo	Q26536873
Garden Wall to East of Chevening Extending from House Through Village	II	Chevening House			16 January 1975	TQ4897357500; 51°17′50″N 0°08′07″E		1336444	Upload Photo	Q26620934
Ornamental Urn in Centre of Parterre	II	Chevening House			16 January 1975	TQ4862257647; 51°17′55″N 0°07′49″E		1085854	Upload Photo	Q26374589
The Chatham Vase on East Side of Lake Near Its South End	II	Chevening House			16 January 1975	TQ4892757371; 51°17′46″N 0°08′05″E		1085855	Upload Photo	Q26374595
The Walled Garden at Chevening Including Potting Range	II*	Chevening House			14 July 1988	TQ4837957803; 51°18′00″N 0°07′37″E		1244220	Upload Photo	Q17545658
Well Head in Centre of the Walled Garden	II	Chevening House			14 July 1988	TQ4841457729; 51°17′58″N 0°07′39″E		1244245	Upload Photo	Q26536874
Wrought Iron Screen and Gates to North of Entrance Courtyard of Chevening House	II	Chevening House			16 January 1975	TQ4867357721; 51°17′57″N 0°07′52″E		1336443	Upload Photo	Q26620933
1 and 3, Chevening Road	II	1 and 3, Chevening Road, Chipstead			16 January 1975	TQ5004656101; 51°17′03″N 0°09′01″E		1085859	Upload Photo	Q26374616
1, Chevening Road	II	1, Chevening Road			16 January 1975	TQ4895357549; 51°17′51″N 0°08′06″E		1085856	Upload Photo	Q26374600
10-12, Chevening Road	II	10-12, Chevening Road			16 January 1975	TQ4889357645; 51°17′54″N 0°08′03″E		1085858	Upload Photo	Q26374610
15-21, Chevening Road	II	15-21, Chevening Road, Chipstead			16 January 1975	TQ4999756145; 51°17′05″N 0°08′58″E		1085860	Upload Photo	Q26374620
2-5, Chevening Road	II	2-5, Chevening Road			16 January 1975	TQ4893057595; 51°17′53″N 0°08′05″E		1336445	Upload Photo	Q26620935
6-8, Chevening Road	II	6-8, Chevening Road			10 September 1954	TQ4891357623; 51°17′54″N 0°08′04″E		1085857	Upload Photo	Q26374604
9, Chevening Road	II	9, Chevening Road			16 January 1975	TQ4890657633; 51°17′54″N 0°08′04″E		1262342	Upload Photo	Q26553223
Church of St Botolph	I	Chevening Road			10 September 1954	TQ4892057695; 51°17′56″N 0°08′05″E		1336446	Church of St Botolph More images	Q17529916
East Side of Bridge Over River Darenth	II	Chevening Road, Chipstead			14 November 1974	TQ4997856194; 51°17′07″N 0°08′57″E		1252366	Upload Photo	Q26544240
Lennard Lodge	II	Chevening Road			16 January 1975	TQ4887857669; 51°17′55″N 0°08′03″E		1252330	Upload Photo	Q26544208
Mill House	II	Chevening Road, Chipstead			16 January 1975	TQ4998656074; 51°17′03″N 0°08′57″E		1336447	Upload Photo	Q26620936
Screen Wall to North of No 3 and Around Corner Along South East Side of Approach to Mill House	II	Chevening Road, Chipstead			16 January 1975	TQ5002456124; 51°17′04″N 0°09′00″E		1252345	Upload Photo	Q26544221
White Lodge	II	Chipstead Lane, Chipstead			16 January 1975	TQ5051256070; 51°17′02″N 0°09′25″E		1336448	Upload Photo	Q26620937
Mounting Block to North East of Old Meeting House	II	Cold Arbor Road, Bessels Green			16 January 1975	TQ5089955610; 51°16′47″N 0°09′44″E		1085874	Upload Photo	Q26374690
Old Meeting House and Dwelling Attached	II	Cold Arbor Road, Bessels Green			10 September 1954	TQ5090055597; 51°16′46″N 0°09′44″E		1336441	Upload Photo	Q26620931
17, High Street	II	17, High Street, Chipstead			10 September 1954	TQ5015356132; 51°17′04″N 0°09′06″E		1252385	Upload Photo	Q26544255
2-16, High Street	II	2-16, High Street, Chipstead			16 January 1975	TQ5007356088; 51°17′03″N 0°09′02″E		1262305	Upload Photo	Q26553189
22-26, High Street	II	22-26, High Street, Chipstead			16 January 1975	TQ5011956102; 51°17′03″N 0°09′04″E		1262306	Upload Photo	Q26553190
29 and 31, High Street	II	29 and 31, High Street, Chipstead			10 September 1954	TQ5020056165; 51°17′05″N 0°09′09″E		1252403	Upload Photo	Q26544271
30 and 32, High Street	II	30 and 32, High Street, Chipstead			16 January 1975	TQ5016156115; 51°17′04″N 0°09′07″E		1336411	Upload Photo	Q26620903
5, High Street	II	5, High Street, Chipstead			16 January 1975	TQ5008556114; 51°17′04″N 0°09′03″E		1085861	Upload Photo	Q26374625
9-13, High Street	II	9-13, High Street, Chipstead			16 January 1975	TQ5011856119; 51°17′04″N 0°09′04″E		1085862	Upload Photo	Q26374631
Bank House	II	High Street, Chipstead			16 January 1975	TQ5025056140; 51°17′05″N 0°09′11″E		1085867	Upload Photo	Q26374657
Chipstead Chapel	II	High Street, Chipstead			23 February 1994	TQ5018056133; 51°17′04″N 0°09′08″E		1244282	Chipstead Chapel More images	Q26536911
Crown House	II	7, High Street, Chipstead			10 September 1954	TQ5009356117; 51°17′04″N 0°09′03″E		1262291	Upload Photo	Q26553177
Forecourt Wall to Nos 2 to 16	II	High Street, Chipstead			16 January 1975	TQ5006956097; 51°17′03″N 0°09′02″E		1085865	Upload Photo	Q26374646
Forecourt Wall to West of the Rock House	II	High Street, Chipstead			16 January 1975	TQ5020656154; 51°17′05″N 0°09′09″E		1262278	Upload Photo	Q26553164
Hollyhock	II	27, High Street, Chipstead			10 September 1954	TQ5019256163; 51°17′05″N 0°09′08″E		1085863	Upload Photo	Q26374635
K6 Telephone Kiosk	II	High Street, Chipstead			11 January 1989	TQ5018856157; 51°17′05″N 0°09′08″E		1272472	Upload Photo	Q26562305
Numbers 23 and 25 and Old Butcher's Shop	II	23 and 25, High Street, Chipstead			10 September 1954	TQ5017056151; 51°17′05″N 0°09′07″E		1252386	Upload Photo	Q26544256
Stable Buildings and Cobbled Yard to West of the Rock House	II	High Street, Chipstead			16 January 1975	TQ5021456145; 51°17′05″N 0°09′09″E		1085866	Upload Photo	Q26374652
The George and Dragon Public House	II	High Street, Chipstead			10 September 1954	TQ5028156135; 51°17′04″N 0°09′13″E		1085864	Upload Photo	Q26374641
The Home Farmhouse	II	33 and 35, High Street, Chipstead			10 September 1954	TQ5021256170; 51°17′06″N 0°09′09″E		1336450	Upload Photo	Q26620939
The Rock House	II	High Street, Chipstead			10 September 1954	TQ5022956150; 51°17′05″N 0°09′10″E		1252412	Upload Photo	Q26544280
Vine Cottage	II	19 and 21, High Street, Chipstead			10 September 1954	TQ5016256137; 51°17′04″N 0°09′07″E		1336449	Upload Photo	Q26620938
Wall to East of Bank House	II	High Street, Chipstead			16 January 1975	TQ5030256112; 51°17′04″N 0°09′14″E		1085868	Upload Photo	Q26374662
West Lodge	II	High Street, Chipstead			16 January 1975	TQ5033656074; 51°17′02″N 0°09′16″E		1252432	Upload Photo	Q26544299
Chipstead War Memorial	II	Homedean Road, Chipstead, TN13 2RU			21 April 2020	TQ5003955952; 51°16′59″N 0°09′00″E		1468920	Upload Photo	Q97457574
Moat Farmhouse	II	Homedean Road, Chipstead			16 January 1975	TQ4996056015; 51°17′01″N 0°08′56″E		1262281	Upload Photo	Q26553167
Middle House Morants Court	II	Morants Court Road			16 January 1975	TQ5006757922; 51°18′02″N 0°09′04″E		1252332	Upload Photo	Q26544210
Front Walls and Gateway to North, North East and North West of West Lodge	II	North East And North West Of West Lodge, High Street, Chipstead			16 January 1975	TQ5034056083; 51°17′03″N 0°09′16″E		1085869	Upload Photo	Q26374668
Summerhouse in Former Grounds of Montreal Park	II	Salter's Road, Riverhead			10 September 1954	TQ5100154921; 51°16′24″N 0°09′48″E		1243298	Upload Photo	Q26535982
1-7, Stairfoot Lane	II	1-7, Stairfoot Lane, Chipstead			16 January 1975	TQ5017056173; 51°17′06″N 0°09′07″E		1262282	Upload Photo	Q26553168
Wall on South West Side	II	Stairfoot Lane, Chipstead			16 January 1975	TQ5018156164; 51°17′05″N 0°09′08″E		1085870	Upload Photo	Q26374673
Walls on North East Side	II	Stairfoot Lane, Chipstead			16 January 1975	TQ5017856173; 51°17′06″N 0°09′08″E		1085871	Upload Photo	Q26374678
Wall and Gate Piers to North and East of White Lodge, the Old Coach House, Cedar Quillet and Tall Trees	II	The Old Coach House, Cedar Quillet And Tall Trees, Chipstead Lane, Chipstead			16 January 1975	TQ5050156079; 51°17′02″N 0°09′24″E		1262322	Upload Photo	Q26553206
29, Westerham Road	II	29, Westerham Road, Bessels Green			16 January 1975	TQ5072555576; 51°16′46″N 0°09′35″E		1249501	Upload Photo	Q26541631
Parkview Prospect Cottage	II	Westerham Road, Bessels Green			10 September 1954	TQ5024555595; 51°16′47″N 0°09′10″E		1336442	Upload Photo	Q26620932
Shrubs Corner	II	Whitley Forest			16 January 1975	TQ5063553805; 51°15′49″N 0°09′28″E		1262283	Upload Photo	Q26553169
Whitley Cottage	II	Whitley Forest			16 January 1975	TQ4993052776; 51°15′16″N 0°08′50″E		1085872	Upload Photo	Q26374684

== See also ==
- Grade I listed buildings in Kent
- Grade II* listed buildings in Kent

== Sources ==
- Newman, John (2012) [1969], Kent: West and the Weald, The Buildings of England, New Haven and London: Yale University Press, ISBN 978-0-300-18509-6
