= Listed buildings in Hartley, Sevenoaks =

Civil Parish in Kent, England

Hartley is a village and civil parish in the Sevenoaks District of Kent, England. It contains one grade I and 17 grade II listed buildings that are recorded in the National Heritage List for England.

This list is based on the information retrieved online from Historic England.

== Key ==
Grade	Criteria
I	Buildings that are of exceptional interest
II*	Particularly important buildings of more than special interest
II	Buildings that are of special interest

== Listing ==
Name	Grade	Location	Type	Completed (Note: The date given is the date used by Historic England as significant for the initial building or that of an important part in the structure's description.)	Date designated	Grid ref. (Note: The grid reference is based on the British national grid reference system, sometimes known as OSGB36, used by the Ordnance Survey.) Geo-coordinates	Notes	Entry number (Note: The "List Entry Number" is a unique number assigned to each listed building and scheduled monument by Historic England.)	Image	Wikidata
Fairby Grange Convalescent Home	II	Ash Road			22 October 1982	TQ6048667431; 51°23′00″N 0°18′17″E		1274139	Upload Photo	Q26563825
Hartley House	II	Ash Road			22 October 1982	TQ6046566750; 51°22′38″N 0°18′15″E		1238240	Upload Photo	Q26531307
Hartley Cottage	II	Castle Hill			22 October 1982	TQ6035767792; 51°23′11″N 0°18′11″E		1238241	Upload Photo	Q26531308
Yew Cottage and Hartley Antiques	II	Castle Hill			22 October 1982	TQ6035867835; 51°23′13″N 0°18′11″E		1238603	Upload Photo	Q26531652
Barn at Brickend	II	Church Road			4 June 1987	TQ6098267266; 51°22′54″N 0°18′43″E		1238245	Upload Photo	Q26531311
Barn to the South West of Hartley Court Fronting Road	II	Church Road			22 October 1982	TQ6134366590; 51°22′32″N 0°19′00″E		1238244	Upload Photo	Q26531310
Brickend	II	Church Road			17 July 1974	TQ6099867273; 51°22′54″N 0°18′44″E		1238776	Upload Photo	Q26531817
Church of All Saints	I	Church Road			1 June 1967	TQ6131966665; 51°22′34″N 0°18′59″E		1238242	Church of All Saints More images	Q17529868
Church of St Francis De Sales	II	Church Road			16 February 1972	TQ6075267704; 51°23′08″N 0°18′32″E		1274097	Church of St Francis De Sales More images	Q26563787
Goodwin's Cottage	II	Church Road			22 October 1982	TQ6120366161; 51°22′18″N 0°18′52″E		1274095	Upload Photo	Q26563786
Hartley Court	II	Church Road			22 October 1982	TQ6136066624; 51°22′33″N 0°19′01″E		1238609	Upload Photo	Q26531658
Middle Farm (carmelite Friary)	II	Church Road			5 June 1972	TQ6078367678; 51°23′07″N 0°18′33″E		1238247	Upload Photo	Q26531313
Woodins	II	Church Road			22 October 1982	TQ6055468025; 51°23′19″N 0°18′22″E		1238246	Upload Photo	Q26531312
Goldsmith Cottage	II	Hartley Bottom Road			22 October 1982	TQ6182566458; 51°22′27″N 0°19′25″E		1238780	Upload Photo	Q26531821
Hartley Bottom Farmhouse	II	Hartley Bottom Road			22 October 1982	TQ6165665933; 51°22′10″N 0°19′15″E		1238781	Upload Photo	Q26531822
Red Cow Farmhouse and Attached Oast House to North	II	Hartley Bottom Road			22 October 1982	TQ6207666916; 51°22′41″N 0°19′39″E		1239124	Upload Photo	Q26532138
Hartley Hill Cottage	II	Hartley Hill			22 October 1982	TQ6128666229; 51°22′20″N 0°18′57″E		1238782	Upload Photo	Q26531823
Manor Farmhouse	II	Manor Road			1 August 1952	TQ6239067715; 51°23′07″N 0°19′56″E		1267634	Upload Photo	Q26558020

== See also ==
- Grade I listed buildings in Kent
- Grade II* listed buildings in Kent

== Sources ==
- Newman, John (2012) [1969], Kent: West and the Weald, The Buildings of England, New Haven and London: Yale University Press, ISBN 978-0-300-18509-6
