= Fawkham =

Village in Kent, England

Coordinates: 51°22′N 0°17′E

- Location within Kent
- Population: 429
- District: Sevenoaks
- Shire county: Kent
- Region: South East
- Country: England
- Sovereign state: United Kingdom
- Post town: LONGFIELD
- Postcode district: DA3
- Police: Kent
- Fire: Kent
- Ambulance: South East Coast
- UK Parliament: Sevenoaks

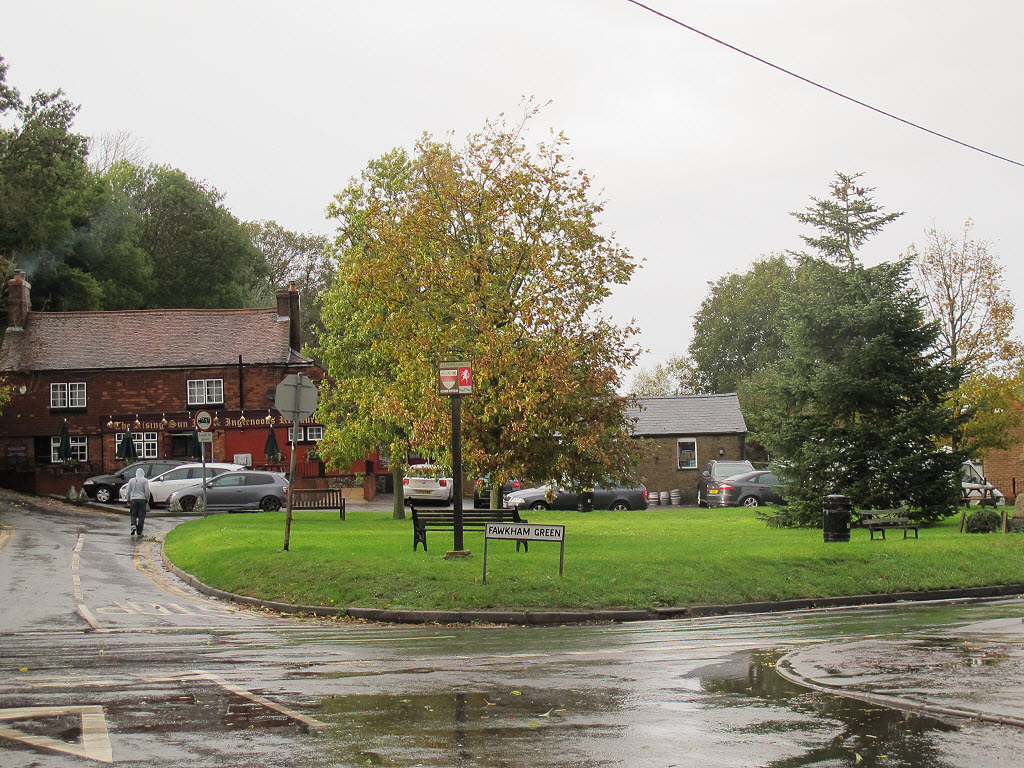
Street of Fawkham after rain

Fawkham is a village and civil parish in the Sevenoaks District of Kent, England. Fawkham is defined as a hamlet by Sevenoaks District Council, with a population of 429. Fawkham is a low density, linear settlement along the bottom of a dry chalk valley some 3 mi (5 km) in length, with secondary lanes intersecting. There is no discernible village centre, although clusters of buildings occur near the Church/junction with Castle Hill, and around the village green and public house at the junction with Fawkham Green Road. There are around 220 houses.

Fawkham is approximately 8 miles (13 km) from Gravesend, 8 miles (13 km) from Dartford and 12 miles (19 km) from Sevenoaks. It is on the northern edge of Sevenoaks district, adjoining its border with Dartford district, south of the village of Longfield. The M20 motorway marks the south-east boundary of the parish, and the London to Chatham railway line the north-east boundary. Brands Hatch motor racing circuit is close by.

Baldwins Green Conservation Area covers part of the village and includes the church. The 12th-century parish church is dedicated to St Mary and is a Grade I listed building. The ecclesiastical parish of Fawkham is part of the united benefice of Fawkham and Hartley.

Fawkham was formerly in Dartford Rural District along with the neighbouring parishes. In medieval times the parish was part of Axstane Hundred. Edward Hasted in his The History and Topographical Survey of the County of Kent: Volume 2(Canterbury, 1797) describes Fawkham Parish as having "two hamlets in it called Fawkham-green and Fawkham-street. The church stands near the northern boundary of it".

Longfield railway station was called Fawkham Station until 1961.

== See also ==
- Listed buildings in Fawkham
