= Listed buildings in Kemsing =

Civil Parish in Kent, England

Kemsing is a village and civil parish in the Sevenoaks District of Kent, England. It contains one grade I, three grade II* and 31 grade II listed buildings recorded in the National Heritage List for England.

== Key ==
Grade	Criteria
I	Buildings that are of exceptional interest
II*	Particularly important buildings of more than special interest
II	Buildings that are of special interest

== Listing ==
Name	Grade	Location	Type	Completed (Note: The date given is the date used by Historic England as significant for the initial building or that of an important part in the structure's description.)	Date designated	Grid ref. (Note: The grid reference is based on the British national grid reference system, sometimes known as OSGB36, used by the Ordnance Survey.) Geo-coordinates	Notes	Entry number (Note: The "List Entry Number" is a unique number assigned to each listed building and scheduled monument by Historic England.)	Image	Wikidata
Stones Stores, Foster House	II	Foster House, High Street			16 January 1975	TQ5553958651; 51°18′21″N 0°13′48″E		1258552	Upload Photo	Q26549774
Forecourt Wall and Gates to North of St Clere	II	Heaverham, St Clere			16 January 1975	TQ5768459179; 51°18′36″N 0°15′39″E		1273379	Upload Photo	Q26563130
Lower St Clere	II	Heaverham, Lower St Clere			16 January 1975	TQ5769958748; 51°18′22″N 0°15′40″E		1273380	Upload Photo	Q26563131
Oast Building to East of Pillar Box House	II	Heaverham			16 January 1975	TQ5711058794; 51°18′24″N 0°15′09″E		1258654	Upload Photo	Q26549867
Outbuilding to North East of St Clere	II	Heaverham, St Clere			10 September 1954	TQ5771659154; 51°18′35″N 0°15′41″E		1258565	Upload Photo	Q26549784
Outbuilding to North West of St Clere	II	Heaverham, St Clere			16 January 1975	TQ5765659156; 51°18′35″N 0°15′38″E		1258566	Upload Photo	Q26549785
Pillar Box House	II	Heaverham			10 September 1954	TQ5708458794; 51°18′24″N 0°15′08″E		1258568	Upload Photo	Q26549787
St Clere	I	Heaverham, St Clere			10 September 1954	TQ5769259121; 51°18′34″N 0°15′40″E		1258564	St Clere More images	Q17529892
The Chequers Public House	II	Heaverham			16 January 1975	TQ5718658672; 51°18′20″N 0°15′13″E		1258567	The Chequers Public House More images	Q26549786
Walnut Tree Cottage	II*	Heaverham			10 September 1954	TQ5708358769; 51°18′23″N 0°15′08″E		1258569	Walnut Tree Cottage More images	Q17545736
Crowdleham	II*	Heaverham Road, Crowdleham, Heaverham			10 September 1954	TQ5674158880; 51°18′27″N 0°14′50″E		1258570	Upload Photo	Q17545742
The Malt House	II	Heaverham Road, Heaverham			10 September 1954	TQ5632358851; 51°18′26″N 0°14′29″E		1273383	Upload Photo	Q26563134
Castle Bank	II	High Street			10 September 1954	TQ5548858713; 51°18′23″N 0°13′45″E		1258539	Upload Photo	Q26549762
Church of St Mary	II*	High Street			10 September 1954	TQ5560858784; 51°18′25″N 0°13′52″E		1258355	Church of St Mary More images	Q17545730
Forecourt Wall to the St Edith's Hall	II	High Street			16 January 1975	TQ5558858666; 51°18′21″N 0°13′50″E		1258538	Upload Photo	Q26549761
Glen Cottage Gwen's Cottage	II	2, High Street			10 September 1954	TQ5558758649; 51°18′21″N 0°13′50″E		1258543	Upload Photo	Q26549765
Kemsing War Memorial	II	High Street, TN15 6NA			24 November 2015	TQ5550058677; 51°18′22″N 0°13′46″E		1430666	Kemsing War Memorial More images	Q26677619
Rose Cottage the Well Cottage	II	High Street			16 January 1975	TQ5551258703; 51°18′22″N 0°13′47″E		1258357	Upload Photo	Q26549602
The Keep	II	High Street			16 January 1975	TQ5550658729; 51°18′23″N 0°13′46″E		1273472	Upload Photo	Q26563216
The St Edith's Hall	II	High Street			16 January 1975	TQ5559358682; 51°18′22″N 0°13′51″E		1273471	Upload Photo	Q26563215
The Vicarage	II	High Street			16 January 1975	TQ5564658677; 51°18′21″N 0°13′54″E		1258356	Upload Photo	Q26549601
Wall in Front of West Part of Garden of the Vicarage	II	High Street			16 January 1975	TQ5562658667; 51°18′21″N 0°13′52″E		1273393	Upload Photo	Q26563143
Wybourne Cottages	II	1 and 2, High Street			16 January 1975	TQ5563658640; 51°18′20″N 0°13′53″E		1258358	Upload Photo	Q26549603
Yew Tree House	II	High Street			16 January 1975	TQ5555158645; 51°18′20″N 0°13′49″E		1258359	Upload Photo	Q26549604
Noah's Ark	II	Noah's Ark Road			16 January 1975	TQ5581357850; 51°17′54″N 0°14′01″E		1273473	Upload Photo	Q26563217
Barn to South West of Dyne's Farmhouse	II	St Edith's Road, Dyne's Farm			25 August 1987	TQ5541258484; 51°18′15″N 0°13′41″E		1244193	Upload Photo	Q26536825
Dormer Cottage	II	10, St Edith's Road			16 January 1975	TQ5545558627; 51°18′20″N 0°13′44″E		1273474	Upload Photo	Q26563218
K6 Telephone Kiosk	II	St Edith's Road			11 January 1989	TQ5547858664; 51°18′21″N 0°13′45″E		1244251	Upload Photo	Q26536880
The Box House	II	St Edith's Road			10 September 1954	TQ5545058687; 51°18′22″N 0°13′43″E		1273375	Upload Photo	Q26563126
Wall in Front of the Box House	II	St Edith's Road			16 January 1975	TQ5546358675; 51°18′21″N 0°13′44″E		1258360	Upload Photo	Q26549605
Broughton	II	Watery Lane, Heaverham			16 January 1975	TQ5709558415; 51°18′11″N 0°15′08″E		1273338	Upload Photo	Q26563090
Ivy Cottage	II	Watery Lane, Heaverham			16 January 1975	TQ5715658604; 51°18′18″N 0°15′11″E		1273381	Upload Photo	Q26563132
47 and 49, West End	II	47 and 49, West End			16 January 1975	TQ5522558682; 51°18′22″N 0°13′32″E		1273378	Upload Photo	Q26563129
Ivy Farm Cottage Ivy Farmhouse	II	West End			16 January 1975	TQ5530358697; 51°18′22″N 0°13′36″E		1273377	Upload Photo	Q26563128
West House	II	3, West End			16 January 1975	TQ5540358698; 51°18′22″N 0°13′41″E		1258361	Upload Photo	Q26549606

== See also ==
- Grade I listed buildings in Kent
- Grade II* listed buildings in Kent

== Sources ==
- Newman, John (2012) [1969], Kent: West and the Weald, The Buildings of England, New Haven and London: Yale University Press, ISBN 978-0-300-18509-6
