= Listed buildings in Crockenhill =

Historic structures in Kent, England

Crockenhill is a village and civil parish in the Sevenoaks District of Kent, England. It contains 19 grade II listed buildings that are recorded in the National Heritage List for England.

This list is based on the information retrieved online from Historic England.

== Key ==
Grade	Criteria
I	Buildings that are of exceptional interest
II*	Particularly important buildings of more than special interest
II	Buildings that are of special interest

== Listing ==
Name	Grade	Location	Type	Completed (Note: The date given is the date used by Historic England as significant for the initial building or that of an important part in the structure's description.)	Date designated	Grid ref. (Note: The grid reference is based on the British national grid reference system, sometimes known as OSGB36, used by the Ordnance Survey.) Geo-coordinates	Notes	Entry number (Note: The "List Entry Number" is a unique number assigned to each listed building and scheduled monument by Historic England.)	Image	Wikidata
Church of All Souls	II	Church Road			17 February 2005	TQ5059167111; 51°22′59″N 0°09′45″E		1391291	Church of All Souls More images	Q26670659
Lychgate to All Souls Church	II	Church Road			17 February 2005	TQ5056667128; 51°23′00″N 0°09′44″E		1391292	Upload Photo	Q26670660
Tomb to Isabella Perceval in All Souls Churchyard	II	Church Road			17 February 2005	TQ5056667099; 51°22′59″N 0°09′44″E		1391293	Upload Photo	Q26670661
Barn at Middle Farm	II	Cray Road			22 May 1995	TQ5002867059; 51°22′58″N 0°09′16″E		1267207	Upload Photo	Q26557623
Coal Taxpost About 30 Yards from the Bungalow	II	Cray Road			20 September 1985	TQ4985267089; 51°22′59″N 0°09′07″E		1186815	Upload Photo	Q26482052
Middle Farmhouse	II	Cray Road			22 October 1982	TQ5003067083; 51°22′59″N 0°09′16″E		1275569	Upload Photo	Q26565143
Pear Tree Cottages	II	52 and 53, Cray Road			22 October 1982	TQ5020167101; 51°22′59″N 0°09′25″E		1217153	Upload Photo	Q26511886
Coal Taxpost 1/2 Mile North of Skeet Hill	II	Daltons Road			20 September 1985	TQ5014865796; 51°22′17″N 0°09′21″E		1186813	Upload Photo	Q26482050
Manor Cottage	II	31, Daltons Road			22 October 1982	TQ5041366371; 51°22′35″N 0°09′35″E		1275552	Upload Photo	Q26565127
Wested Farm Barn Including Chaff House	II	Eynsford Road			19 June 1991	TQ5174566820; 51°22′49″N 0°10′45″E		1223576	Upload Photo	Q26517834
Wested Farmhouse	II	Eynsford Road			1 August 1952	TQ5179066861; 51°22′50″N 0°10′47″E		1217154	Upload Photo	Q26511887
Coal Taxpost Outside Willow Bank	II	Green Court Road			20 September 1985	TQ5063767615; 51°23′15″N 0°09′49″E		1253824	Upload Photo	Q26545545
Moat Farmhouse	II	Green Court Road			22 October 1982	TQ5057367480; 51°23′11″N 0°09′45″E		1217156	Upload Photo	Q26511889
Oasthouses in 2 Parallel Ranges at Parkgate House	II	Parkgate Road, Lullingstone			25 March 1981	TQ5056164639; 51°21′39″N 0°09′40″E		1222215	Upload Photo	Q26516561
Parkgate House	II	Parkgate Road, Lullingstone			1 August 1952	TQ5059264657; 51°21′40″N 0°09′42″E		1222297	Upload Photo	Q26516639
Petham Court Farmhouse	II	Saint Georges Road			22 October 1982	TQ5178767468; 51°23′09″N 0°10′48″E		1273883	Upload Photo	Q26563590
Davidson House	II	Skeet Hill Lane, Orpington, St Mary Cray			14 March 1973	TQ4984465095; 51°21′55″N 0°09′04″E		1204548	Upload Photo	Q26499982
Coal Taxpost at Junction of Green Court Road	II	Stones Cross Road			20 September 1985	TQ5055967824; 51°23′22″N 0°09′45″E		1299019	Upload Photo	Q26586450
Coal Taxpost by Pond	II	Stones Cross Road			20 September 1985	TQ5041067447; 51°23′10″N 0°09′37″E		1253832	Upload Photo	Q26545553

== See also ==
- Grade I listed buildings in Kent
- Grade II* listed buildings in Kent

== Sources ==
- Newman, John (2012) [1969], Kent: West and the Weald, The Buildings of England, New Haven and London: Yale University Press, ISBN 978-0-300-18509-6
