= Poundsbridge Manor =

Oak timber-framed house built in 1593

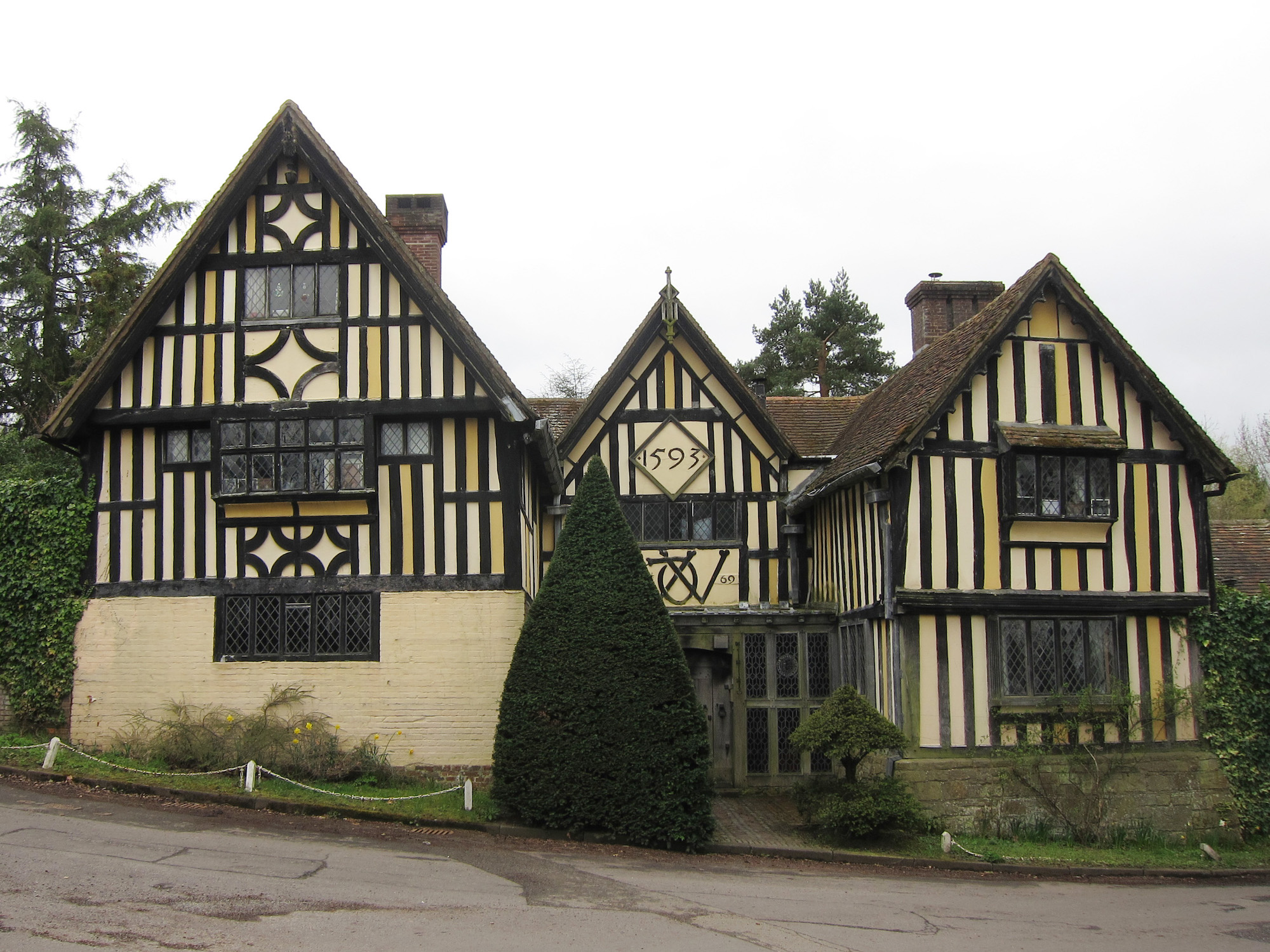
- Poundsbridge Manor (the "Picture House")

- Location within Kent

General information
- Location: Penshurst, Kent
- Coordinates: 51°09′18″N 0°12′01″E
- Completed: 1593

Design and construction
- Architects: John & Brian Durtnell

Poundsbridge Manor, nicknamed "The Picture House", is an oak timber-framed house built in 1593 by John and Brian Durtnall for their father William, Rector of Penshurst from 1563 to 1596. Originally, it was called "Durtnolls" and it has an inscription "1593 WD ETA 69". WD are the initials of William Durtnell and the letter D, looking like an inverted Q, is the Gothic form of the letter. ETA 69 (ETA is a mistake for "aet", aetatis suae) means he was 69 years old when the house was finished. In 1678 it was owned by an Edmond Woodgate and he left it to his nephew Thomas Woodgate, a yeoman of Farningham, who left it to his wife. Later, it was divided in two and one part became a tavern.

It was illustrated by Samuel Prout, was also illustrated in a book of 1810 in a drawing by Paul Amsinck, engraved by Letitia Byrne, and by an F. Grant (Note: Not Sir Francis Grant.) in 1906 (owned by Tunbridge Wells Museum and Art Gallery).

In 1906 it was described as "Pounds Bridge" inn and being "on a secluded road between Speldhurst and Penshurst, in Kent". It is now a Grade II listed building. In the Second World War, the house was hit by a stray bomb and the extensive rebuilding that was required was again done by Durtnell's.

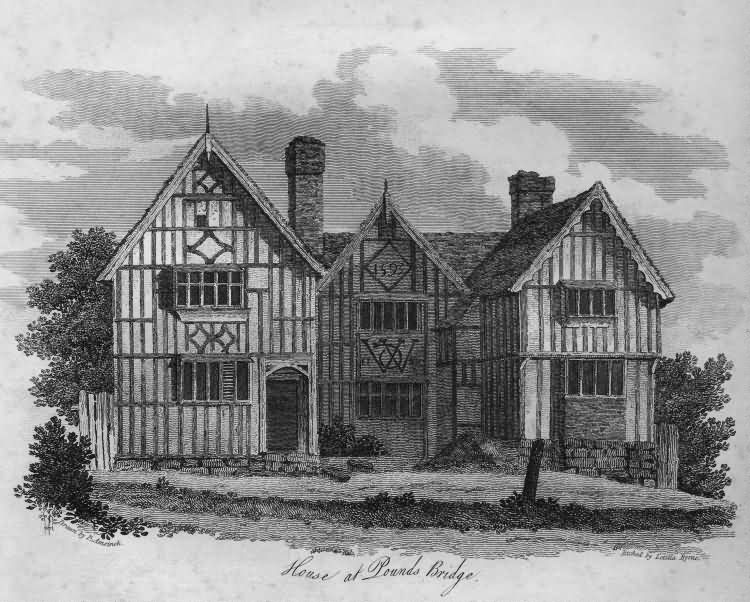
House at Pounds Bridge, by Letitia Byrne, 1810

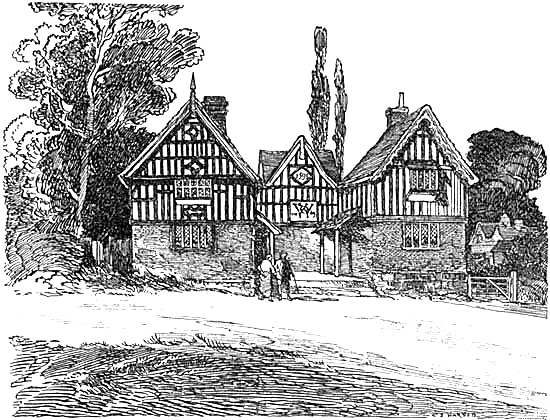
Harper's sketch of "Pounds Bridge" Inn in 1906

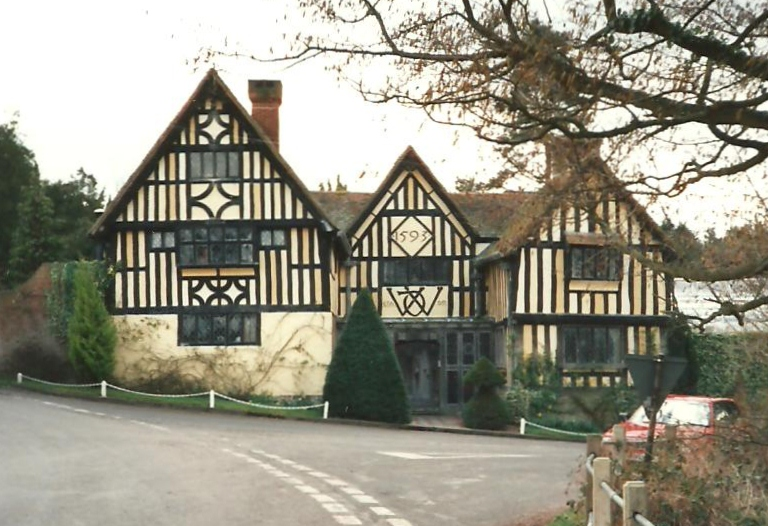
Poundsbridge Manor in 1995
