= List of places of worship in Sevenoaks District =

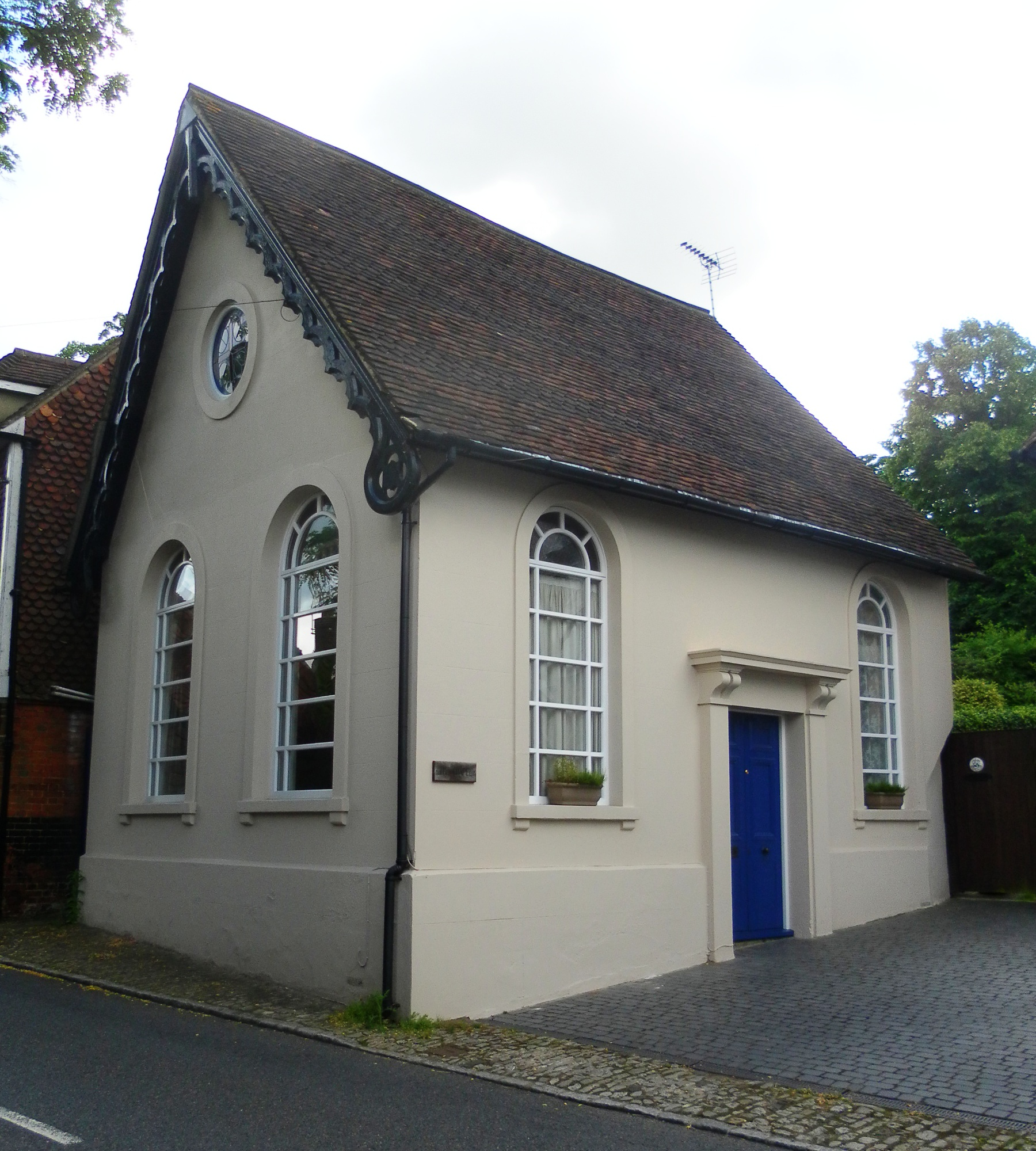
This Grade II-listed former Bible Christian chapel in Chipstead has been converted into a house

The district of Sevenoaks, one of 13 local government districts in the English county of Kent, has nearly 120 current and former places of worship. The town of Sevenoaks, the administrative centre of the area, has many of these—from its ancient Anglican parish church to Victorian chapels and 20th-century meeting places for various Christian denominations. Smaller towns such as Edenbridge, Swanley and Westerham are also well provided with places of worship; and the mostly rural district's villages and hamlets have many of their own, covering a wide variety of ages, architectural styles and denominations. 89 places of worship are in use in the district and a further 28 former churches and chapels no longer hold religious services but survive in alternative uses.

Census results show that Christianity is followed by a majority of the district's residents. Nearly 50 Anglican churches currently serve the Church of England, the country's Established Church. Roman Catholics and worshippers affiliated with various Protestant Nonconformist, Pentecostal and other Christian denominations are accommodated in a variety of mostly 19th- and 20th-century chapels and meeting rooms: Baptists, Methodists and the United Reformed Church each maintain several congregations, there are seven Roman Catholic churches, and smaller groups such as the Open Brethren, Christian Scientists and Jehovah's Witnesses can also be found in the district.

English Heritage has awarded listed status to 48 places of worship in the district of Sevenoaks. A building is defined as "listed" when it is placed on a statutory register of buildings of "special architectural or historic interest" in accordance with the Planning (Listed Buildings and Conservation Areas) Act 1990. The Department for Culture, Media and Sport, a Government department, is responsible for this; English Heritage, a non-departmental public body, acts as an agency of the department to administer the process and advise the department on relevant issues. There are three grades of listing status. Grade I, the highest, is defined as being of "exceptional interest"; Grade II* is used for "particularly important buildings of more than special interest"; and Grade II, the lowest, is used for buildings of "special interest". As of February 2001, there were 23 Grade I-listed buildings, 85 with Grade II* status and 1,481 Grade II-listed buildings in the district.

== Overview of the district and its places of worship ==
Sevenoaks is located in the west of Kent.

The district of Sevenoaks covers approximately 142 sq mi (370 km^{2}) of mostly rural land in the far west of Kent. Clockwise from the north, it shares borders with four other boroughs in Kent—Dartford, Gravesham, Tonbridge and Malling and Tunbridge Wells—then with the district of Wealden in East Sussex, the district of Tandridge in Surrey, and the London Boroughs of Bromley and Bexley. The population at the time of the 2001 United Kingdom census was 109,305. Sevenoaks itself, a commuter town with a population of about 18,500, is the largest settlement and the seat of local government; Swanley and Edenbridge are also major centres of population, with populations of 16,588 and 7,808 respectively as of 2001.

Sevenoaks town and its environs grew rapidly during the Victorian era. The ancient parish church of St Nicholas was supplemented by Decimus Burton's St Mary's Church (1831) at Riverhead, St John's Church (1858–59) and St Mary's Church at Kippington (1878–80). The Roman Catholic church dates from 1896. For Nonconformists, a General Baptist chapel was erected in 1842, the original Wesleyan Methodist church opened in 1852, the large Congregational church at St John's Hill was finished in 1866 and Bible Christian and Baptist chapels were added in 1882 and 1886 respectively.

== Religious affiliation ==
According to the 2001 United Kingdom census, 109,305 people lived in the district of Sevenoaks. Of these, 77.02% identified themselves as Christian, 0.34% were Muslim, 0.2% were Hindu, 0.2% were Buddhist, 0.15% were Jewish, 0.09% were Sikh, 0.27% followed another religion, 14.43% claimed no religious affiliation and 7.3% did not state their religion. The proportion of Christians was much higher than the 71.74% in England as a whole. Adherents of Islam, Hinduism, Judaism and Sikhism and Buddhism were much less prevalent in the district than in England overall: in 2001, 3.1% of people in England were Muslim, 1.11% were Hindu, 0.67% were Sikh, 0.52% were Jewish and 0.28% were Buddhist. The proportion of people who followed religions not mentioned in the Census was slightly lower than the national figure of 0.29%, as was the proportion of people with no religious affiliation (for which the national average was 14.59%).

== Administration ==
=== Anglican churches ===
All but one of Sevenoaks district's Anglican churches are administered by the Diocese of Rochester, the seat of which is Rochester Cathedral. The single exception is St Mary Magdalene's Church at Cowden, which is part of the Diocese of Chichester. Within that area, it is part of the Archdeaconry of Horsham and the Deanery of East Grinstead.

The Diocese of Rochester has three archdeaconries—Bexley & Bromley, Rochester and Tonbridge—each of which are further subdivided into deaneries. The church at Well Hill is in the Orpington Deanery of Bexley & Bromley Archdeaconry. The Rochester archdeaconry administers the churches at Ash, Fawkham, Hartley (two churches) and Ridley, which are in the Cobham deanery, and those at Crockenhill, Hextable, Horton Kirby and Swanley (two churches) within the Dartford deanery. All others are in the Tonbridge archdeaconry, in one of three deaneries. The Sevenoaks deanery covers the churches at Brasted, Chevening, Chipstead, Halstead, Ide Hill, Kippington, Knockholt, Riverhead, Seal, Seal Chart, Sevenoaks Weald, Sundridge, Underriver, Westerham and the three in Sevenoaks town. Eynsford, Farningham, Kemsing, Lullingstone, Otford, Shoreham, West Kingsdown and Woodlands are covered by the Shoreham deanery. The Tonbridge deanery administers the churches at Chiddingstone, Chiddingstone Causeway, Edenbridge, Fordcombe, Four Elms, Hever, Leigh, Markbeech, Penshurst, Poundsbridge and Toys Hill.

=== Roman Catholic churches ===
The seven Roman Catholic churches in the borough—at Edenbridge, Hartley, Otford, Sevenoaks, Swanley, Westerham and West Kingsdown—are in the Archdiocese of Southwark, the seat of which is St George's Cathedral in Southwark, southeast London. The archdiocese has 20 deaneries, of which seven are in Kent. The churches at Hartley and Swanley are in the Gravesend deanery. Those at Edenbridge, Sevenoaks and Westerham are in the Tunbridge Wells deanery, as are the Otford and West Kingsdown churches because they are within the four-church Roman Catholic parish of Sevenoaks.

=== Other denominations ===
About 150 Baptist churches in southeast England are part of the South Eastern Baptist Association, which arranges its member congregations into geographical networks. West Kingsdown Baptist Church is part of the North Kent Network, while the Baptist churches in Bessels Green, Edenbridge, Eynsford and Sevenoaks are in the Tonbridge Network. The Westerham Evangelical Congregational Church, while not formally a Baptist place of worship, also maintains links with this network.

As of 2010, The Drive Methodist Church in Sevenoaks, Otford Methodist Church and Sevenoaks Weald Methodist Church were part of the Sevenoaks Methodist Circuit within that denomination's South East District.

Crockenhill Baptist Church and Otford Evangelical Free Church are members of the Fellowship of Independent Evangelical Churches (FIEC), a pastoral and administrative network of about 500 churches with an evangelical outlook, and of Affinity (formerly the British Evangelical Council)—a network of conservative Evangelical congregations throughout Great Britain. Westerham Evangelical Congregational Church is also affiliated with this group and with the Evangelical Fellowship of Congregational Churches, a fellowship of independent Congregational churches. Churches belonging to various denominations are affiliated with the Evangelical Alliance. These are the Vine Baptist Church, Vine Evangelical Church and Sevenoaks Town Church in Sevenoaks, the Bessels Green Baptist Church, the Baptist church and Kings Church in West Kingsdown, the Revelation Church at Ash Chapel in New Ash Green, Swanley Full Gospel Church, and St Peter's Anglican church at Hextable.

Dunton Green Free Church is part of the 34-church South-East Area of the Congregational Federation, an association of 294 independent Congregational churches in Great Britain. The federation came into existence in 1972 when the Congregational Church in England and Wales merged with several other denominations to form the United Reformed Church. Certain congregations wanted to remain independent of this and joined the Congregational Federation instead.

== Current places of worship ==
Current places of worship
Name	Image	Location	Denomination/ Affiliation	Grade	Notes	Refs
St Peter and St Paul's Church		Ash; 51.3574°N 0.2996°E	Anglican	I	Thomas Graham Jackson's "sympathetic" alterations of 1901–03 did little to change the appearance of the flint and sandstone 14th/15th-century church, whose dressings are mostly of a colourful red brick. There is much Decorated and Perpendicular Gothic detail throughout.	
Bessels Green Baptist Church		Bessels Green; 51.2783°N 0.1588°E	Baptist	II	The chapel is near the village's most prominent house, the Victorian-era Bessels House, but is a century older. The manse adjoins; it has square-headed rather than arched windows and a dormer in the tiled roof, but otherwise blends in with the painted brick chapel. Additions in the 19th century include two porches with bargeboards.	
Unitarian Meeting House		Bessels Green; 51.2795°N 0.1622°E	Unitarian	II	Like the Baptist chapel, this is 18th-century and has a house attached. It originated in 1716 but was rebuilt in 1740, retaining some of the older fabric. The chapel is single-storey and has a three-casement window façade. Mixed red and blue brickwork and some stonework make up the walls. The two-bay single-storey house was extended in the 19th century. The tiled roof is hipped and steeply sloping.	
St Martin's Church		Brasted; 51.2796°N 0.1043°E	Anglican	II*	The 13th-century church (which contained some older fabric) was rebuilt by Alfred Waterhouse in 1864–65 and restored again after World War II (when the windows were bombed out) and in 1989 following fire damage. The walls are of sandstone, and there is a heavily buttressed west tower. Inside are some 17th-century alabaster monuments. Some of the windows have "outstanding and innovative" tracery designed by Waterhouse.	
St Botolph's Church		Chevening; 51.2989°N 0.1347°E	Anglican	I	The church has Saxon origins, but the present building is mostly 13th-century and the Perpendicular Gothic tower dates from after 1518. W. D. Caroe's restoration of 1901–02 added to some changes made in 1869. Inside, an "outstanding" collection of monuments spanning several centuries are associated with nearby Chevening House. Flint, rubble and local ragstone are the main materials.	
St Mary's Church		Chiddingstone; 51.1863°N 0.1462°E	Anglican	II*	A fire in 1624 prompted rebuilding of this 14th-century church over the next five years. Evidence of 13th-century lancet windows survives, and there was a church here in Saxon times. The ornately decorated tower is Perp. Internal fittings by George Edmund Street and Thomas Earp and stained glass by Charles Eamer Kempe are also of interest.	
St Luke's Church		Chiddingstone Causeway; 51.1975°N 0.1758°E	Anglican	II*	John Francis Bentley's only Anglican church is loosely Decorated Gothic Revival in style, dates from 1897 to 1898 and replaced a tin tabernacle. The tower is wide and short, the Bath Stone blocks "meticulously laid" and the windows "placed with fastidious whimsy". The east window (1906) is German Expressionist in style.	
Chapel of the Good Shepherd		Chipstead; 51.2831°N 0.1499°E	Anglican	–	This is a chapel of ease in the parish of St Botolph's Church, Chevening. Services are held at 8.00am on Sundays.	
St Mary Magdalene's Church		Cowden; 51.1448°N 0.0948°E	Anglican	I	The church is principally Decorated Gothic in style, with some Perpendicular Gothic elements. The nave was built first in the 13th century, followed by the chancel (late 13th- or early 14th-century) and the tower and its crooked spire (15th-century). Many of the internal fittings are of the same era. John Whichcord added an aisle and a gallery in 1838; a further restoration (1884 by W.O. Milne) took out the iron columns he added. World War II bomb damage to the spire has been repaired.	
All Souls Church		Crockenhill; 51.3831°N 0.1626°E	Anglican	II	Edwin Nash designed this church in the Early English Gothic Revival style in 1851 using local ragstone and Caen stone. The nave and chancel are of different heights. There is no tower or steeple, but a clock face has been inserted in the gable end of the west elevation. The internal fittings are "virtually complete" and include stained glass of 1853 and a Henry Willis organ of 1856.	
Crockenhill Baptist Church		Crockenhill; 51.3835°N 0.1640°E	Baptist	–	Under the name Crockenhill Baptist Chapel, this building was legally registered for marriages in July 1879. An earlier chapel had served the village since 1801.	
Holy Trinity Church		Crockham Hill; 51.2374°N 0.0674°E	Anglican	II	Only the builders of this 1842 church—locally based Mr Horseman and son—and its sponsor, Charles Warde of Westerham, are known: the architect responsible for the "archaeologically faithful, though rather severe" Perpendicular Gothic Revival design has not been recorded. The nave and chancel are unequal in height, and a tower rises at the west end. Local stone was used throughout. Inside, Octavia Hill is commemorated by a carving dated 1912.	
Dunton Green Free Church		Dunton Green; 51.2925°N 0.1682°E	Congregational Federation	–	Congregationalists built a church on London Road in the village in 1873, but it passed to another denomination when this new building on Station Road was finished in 1937. The first service was held on 30 September 1937. The church was linked to Sevenoaks Congregational Church until the 1960s.	
St Peter and St Paul's Church		Edenbridge; 51.1961°N 0.0666°E	Anglican	I	There is much 13th- and 14th-century fabric in this long, low sandstone-built church, and the south chapel (a memorial to Richard Martyn) can be precisely dated to 1499. An Early English Gothic tower with a pyramidal spire dominates the west end. The elaborate pulpit is of the 1630s.	
The Eden Church		Edenbridge; 51.1948°N 0.0659°E	Baptist	–		
St Lawrence's Church		Edenbridge; 51.1980°N 0.0639°E	Roman Catholic	–	The town's Roman Catholic church stands on the High Street and is dedicated to Lawrence the Martyr. Its marriage registration dates from February 1933. Before the church opened in that year, Edenbridge's Roman Catholics travelled across the county boundary to All Saints Church in Oxted, Surrey.	
St Martin of Tours' Church		Eynsford; 51.3674°N 0.2116°E	Anglican	I	Some 12th-century work survives in this flint and stone church (such as two windows in the chancel), but there are parts from each of the next four centuries and the building was restored in the Victorian era. An original apse and side chapel have been lost, but a cross-gabled aisle was added in the 16th century.	
Eynsford Baptist Church		Eynsford; 51.3699°N 0.2145°E	Baptist	–	There was an older Baptist church in this village, which was closed and replaced by the present building in around December 1907. The original chapel had been registered for marriages in August 1837.	
St Peter and St Paul's Church		Farningham; 51.3801°N 0.2218°E	Anglican	I	A "well-proportioned tower of the Kentish type", with stepped corner buttresses and rising in three stages to a castellated top with an octagonal corner turret, is the principal original feature here. John Shaw, Sr. and Ewan Christian carried out extensive restorations in 1830 and 1868–71 respectively. In the churchyard, Thomas Nash—uncle of architect John Nash—is buried in an elaborate cube-shaped mausoleum possibly designed by his nephew.	
St Mary's Church		Fawkham; 51.3890°N 0.2939°E	Anglican	I	This tiny chapel, in a wooded setting, has rendered walls and painted stonework around the windows, a large wooden porch and a tall weatherboarded bellcote on the tiled roof. This dates from the 16th century and is topped with a spike-like spire. There is 13th- and 14th-century work inside, including a mural of Christ in Majesty.	
St Peter's Church		Fordcombe; 51.1421°N 0.1791°E	Anglican	II	Built 1847–1848 by Henry Isaac Stevens, the east end is modelled after Skelton Church in North Yorkshire. A deep, gabled north east vestry was added in 1883 by E. J. Tarver, and stained glass windows designed by H. W. Lonsdale were added in the north and south of the nave between 1883 and 1895, as well as in the east side of the chancel in 1906, designed by Percy Bacon and Bros. The latter was supervised by Fellowes Prynne, who also completed work on the screen in 1906.	
St Paul's Church		Four Elms; 51.2144°N 0.1034°E	Anglican	II	Built 1880–1881 by E. T. Hall, the nave and chancel are combined. Fittings include a white marble reredos from 1917, as well as choir stalls and a chancel screen designed in 1915, all designed by Lethaby with the former executed by Stirling Lee and Henry Pegram. The organ case by F. C. Eden dates to 1923, and a set of Clayton and Bell stained glass windows reside in the east side of the chancel, built between 1881 and 1887.	
St Margaret's Church		Halstead; 51.3352°N 0.1285°E	Anglican	II	The chancel dates to 1855, designed by R. C. Hussey and built as a burial chapel. The nave was built 1880–1881 by W. M. Teulon, and the north aisle and vestry were added by St Aubyn and Wadling in 1897, with the outer north aisle dating to 1992. Monuments inside the church date to the 15th century, remnants of the previous medieval church demolished circa 1881.	
All Saints Church		Hartley; 51.3761°N 0.3165°E	Anglican	I	The nave is 12th-century and the lower, diagonally buttressed chancel dates from one or two centuries later, and most other external features are 19th-century. "The only memorable feature" inside or out, according to architectural historian John Newman, is the Norman hingework on the door. Many old and elaborate gravestones can be seen in the churchyard.	
All Saints Church Centre		Hartley; 51.3825°N 0.3063°E	Anglican	–	This modern building is used as a church and hall, and is one of three churches in the parish of Fawkham and Hartley.	
St Francis De Sales' Church		Hartley; 51.3856°N 0.3089°E	Roman Catholic	II	Hartley's Roman Catholic church, which was opened in 1913 registered for marriages in July 1938, occupies a Grade II-listed 17th-century barn with internal timber framing and a queen post roof. The interior has aisles and is divided into three bays, and the thatched roof has a pentice. The barn was originally part of Middle Farm.	
St Peter's Church		Hever; 51.1800°N 0.1066°E	Anglican	I	Built out of sandstone, the earliest identifiable section is the arcade to the north aisle, dated to around the early 13th century. The southern nave wall, as stated by John Newman, dates to the 13th century or earlier due to the lack of a plinth. The church was restored in 1894 by R. P. Day, which includes perpendicular two-light windows inserted in the nave, north aisle and southern porch. A chantry was permitted to Sir Geoffrey Bullen in the north chapel in 1465, although the basket-arched east windows as well as the west and south arches firmly date the chapel to the early 16th century.	
St Peter's Church		Hextable; 51.4108°N 0.1815°E	Anglican	–	Hextable's Anglican church is in the parish of St Paul's Church, Swanley Village. The brick-walled, slate-roofed building consists of the original Hextable Mission Church, founded by St Paul's in 1905, and an octagonal extension built in 1980.	
Hextable Methodist Church		Hextable; 51.4088°N 0.1822°E	Methodist	–	This brick chapel was built for Wesleyan Methodists in 1896 at a cost of £434. Under the name Wesleyan Methodist Chapel, it was registered for marriages in May 1913.	
St Mary's Church		Horton Kirby; 51.3946°N 0.2439°E	Anglican	II*		
St Mary's Church		Ide Hill; 51.2451°N 0.1279°E	Anglican	II*		
St Mary's Church		Kemsing; 51.3069°N 0.2310°E	Anglican	II*		
St Mary's Church		Kippington, Sevenoaks; 51.2702°N 0.1797°E	Anglican	II		
St Katherine's Church		Knockholt; 51.3106°N 0.1046°E	Anglican	II*		
London Road Evangelical Church		Knockholt Pound; 51.3170°N 0.1266°E	Evangelical	–	John Wills, a Derby-based Nonconformist church architect, designed this simple yellow-brick building on the old London Road in Knockholt in 1887. William Wiltshire was the builder, and the cost was £981. Provided for Wesleyan Methodists, it replaced a timber chapel of 1825 and was named the Townend Memorial Chapel. It was sold to an Evangelical congregation in 1968.	
St Mary's Church		Leigh; 51.1977°N 0.2152°E	Anglican	II*		
St Botolph's Church		Lullingstone; 51.3584°N 0.1959°E	Anglican	I		
Holy Trinity Church		Markbeech; 51.1652°N 0.1079°E	Anglican	II		
Kingdom Hall		Marsh Green; 51.1808°N 0.0576°E	Jehovah's Witnesses	–	This Kingdom Hall was registered for marriages in February 1999. It is used by the Oxted Congregation of Jehovah's Witnesses; the town of Oxted is in the neighbouring county of Surrey.	
St John's United Reformed Church		Marsh Green; 51.1804°N 0.0572°E	United Reformed Church	–	Greybury Presbyterian Church and its adjoining school, which also survives, were opened by J.T. Morton on 21 June 1882. Architecturally the complex is Early English Gothic Revival and features bands of red and white brick with some stonework, a slate roof and a corner tower with a spire. The windows have tracery. The church is now part of the United Reformed Church.	
Ash Chapel		New Ash Green; 51.3641°N 0.2968°E	Evangelical	–		
St Bartholomew's Church		Otford; 51.3124°N 0.1917°E	Anglican	I		
Otford Evangelical Free Church		Otford; 51.3118°N 0.1742°E	Evangelical	–	Standing on Pilgrims Way West, this was registered for marriages April 1959 under the name Pilgrims Way Chapel.	
Otford Methodist Church		Otford; 51.3133°N 0.1861°E	Methodist	–	This building on the north side of Otford's main street replaces an older building on the other side of the road, which survives in secular use. The new church was registered for marriages in August 1936.	
Church of the Most Holy Trinity		Otford; 51.3127°N 0.1835°E	Roman Catholic	–	Otford's Roman Catholic church was registered for marriages in February 1981.	
St John the Baptist's Church		Penshurst; 51.1736°N 0.1834°E	Anglican	I		
All Souls Chapel		Poundsbridge; 51.1541°N 0.1961°E	Anglican	–	Mervyn Edward Macartney's "uneventful" Early English Gothic Revival-style rebuild of an 1854 cemetery chapel was completed in 1889. It later became an Anglican chapel of ease in Penshurst parish. The sandstone building has lancet windows, a bellcote and a tiled roof.	
St Peter's Church		Ridley; 51.3536°N 0.3196°E	Anglican	II*		
St Mary's Church		Riverhead; 51.2841°N 0.1708°E	Anglican	II		
St Peter and St Paul's Church		Seal; 51.2906°N 0.2224°E	Anglican	I		
St Lawrence's Church		Seal Chart; 51.2743°N 0.2538°E	Anglican	–	Charles Henry Howell designed Seal Chart's church in 1867–68, but the tower dates from 1888 and was by a different architect (F.W. Hunt). W. Constable was the builder. The Perpendicular Gothic Revival church has lancet windows, sandstone walls and a tiled roof.	
St Nicholas' Church		Sevenoaks; 51.2674°N 0.1934°E	Anglican	II*	The current building mostly dates back to the 13th century, with the main section being rebuilt sometime in the 15th century. The earliest reference to the church is in the Textus Roffensis, compiled circa 1120. Excavation under the church building was completed in 1995 to provide more on-site space.	
St John the Baptist's Church		Sevenoaks; 51.2833°N 0.1954°E	Anglican	–	Architects Morphew and Green originally designed the west building in 1858, with the north aisle being built in the same gothic style in 1878. The east end of the church was built using brick between 1901 and 1905, and a chancel bellcote was later added in 1939, after the First World War had disrupted plans for a complete rebuild.	
St Luke's Church		Sevenoaks; 51.2743°N 0.1862°E	Anglican	–		
The Vine Baptist Church		Sevenoaks; 51.2771°N 0.1940°E	Baptist	–		
Vine Evangelical Church		Sevenoaks; 51.2775°N 0.1933°E	Brethren	–		
First Church of Christ, Scientist		Sevenoaks; 51.2707°N 0.1898°E	Christian Scientist	–		
Hope Church (Sevenoaks Town Church)		Sevenoaks; 51.2888°N 0.1998°E	Evangelical	–		
Kingdom Hall		Sevenoaks; 51.2808°N 0.1959°E	Jehovah's Witnesses	–	The building is now used by the Sevenoaks Congregation of Jehovah's Witnesses. Opened as Bethel Chapel in 1842 for General Baptists in an area of Sevenoaks known then as Harts Lands, it was re-registered for worship by The Salvation Army in 1919. They left by October 1967, and the Kingdom Hall was established in the premises by June 1968.	
The Drive Methodist Church		Sevenoaks; 51.2740°N 0.1919°E	Methodist	–		
Friends Meeting House		Sevenoaks; 51.2806°N 0.1956°E	Quaker	–	The building was originally residential and dates from the mid-19th century. It was bought by local Quakers (who had been meeting in a church hall) in 1958, and after various alterations it opened as a meeting house in 1960 and was registered accordingly in November of that year.	
Church of St Thomas of Canterbury		Sevenoaks; 51.2731°N 0.1864°E	Roman Catholic	–		
Christ Church		Sevenoaks; 51.2779°N 0.1784°E	United Reformed Church	–		
Sevenoaks United Reformed Church		Sevenoaks; 51.2822°N 0.1942°E	United Reformed Church	–		
St George's Church		Sevenoaks Weald; 51.2405°N 0.1892°E	Anglican	II		
Weald Methodist Church		Sevenoaks Weald; 51.2363°N 0.1863°E	Methodist	–	The brick building has stood on the village green since 1843. The main elevation is in an elaborate Renaissance Revival style.	
St Peter and St Paul's Church		Shoreham; 51.3330°N 0.1845°E	Anglican	I		
South Darenth Village Church		South Darenth; 51.4010°N 0.2535°E	Non-denominational	–		
Southdowns Chapel		South Darenth; 51.4010°N 0.2535°E	Non-denominational	–		
St Mary's Church		Sundridge; 51.2743°N 0.1292°E	Anglican	I		
St Mary the Virgin's Church		Swanley; 51.3976°N 0.1720°E	Anglican	–		
Swanley Full Gospel Church		Swanley; 51.4049°N 0.1568°E	Assemblies of God	–	This building stands on Hockenden Lane on the edge of Swanley, and received its authorisation for certifying marriages in March 1986.	
Meeting Room		Swanley; 51.4067°N 0.1630°E	Brethren	–	Standing on Leydenhatch Lane at the north end of Swanley near Hextable, this Brethren meeting hall was registered for marriages in October 1988.	
Elim Christian Centre		Swanley; 51.3947°N 0.1644°E	Elim Pentecostal	–	This Pentecostal place of worship was registered for marriages in December 1986.	
Kingdom Hall		Swanley; 51.3923°N 0.1864°E	Jehovah's Witnesses	–	This Kingdom Hall is used by the London, Swanley Congregation of Jehovah's Witnesses. It was registered for marriages in October 1984.	
Church of the Holy Apostles		Swanley; 51.3982°N 0.1740°E	Roman Catholic	–	The Twelve Apostles Church Hall on London Road was used for Catholic worship in Swanley between 1931 and January 1965, at which point the present building—with a slightly amended dedication—was registered.	
Christ Church		Swanley; 51.3943°N 0.1810°E	United Reformed Church	–		
St Paul's Church		Swanley Village; 51.4062°N 0.1978°E	Anglican	II		
Toys Hill Hall		Toys Hill; 51.2418°N 0.1038°E	Anglican	–	This building lies within the parish of Four Elms, Hever and Markbeech.	
St Margaret's Church		Underriver; 51.2458°N 0.2292°E	Anglican	II		
Well Hill Mission Church		Well Hill; 51.3570°N 0.1512°E	Anglican	–	This small chapel of ease dates from 1890 and is now administered from St Martin of Tours' Church in Chelsfield.	
St Edmund's Church		West Kingsdown; 51.3508°N 0.2673°E	Anglican	I		
West Kingsdown Baptist Church		West Kingsdown; 51.3412°N 0.2675°E	Baptist	–		
King's Church		West Kingsdown; 51.3383°N 0.2670°E	Evangelical	–		
St Bernadette's Church		West Kingsdown; 51.3425°N 0.2683°E	Roman Catholic	–		
St Mary the Virgin's Church		Westerham; 51.2676°N 0.0736°E	Anglican	II*		
Westerham Evangelical Congregational Church		Westerham; 51.2676°N 0.0704°E	Independent Congregational (EFCC)	II		
St John the Baptist's Church		Westerham; 51.2657°N 0.0775°E	Roman Catholic	–	Priests from Sevenoaks celebrated Mass at various locations in Westerham between 1920 and 1955, when the brick-built church was opened on Hosey Hill. It was founded in April 1954, but work had started in the 1930s only to be interrupted by World War II. J. Hicks of St Leonards-on-Sea was the architect. Fr Maurice Castelli, the first priest, was a major benefactor.	
St Mary the Virgin's Church		Woodlands; 51.3283°N 0.2562°E	Anglican	II	In an "amazingly remote position" at the edge of the Knatt's Valley stands this church of 1851–52 and a vicarage and school in similar style. The group of buildings was funded by Major Vincent of Guy's Hospital and was designed by Thomas Talbot Bury. The materials are flint and stone, and the roofs are tiled.	

== Former places of worship ==
Former places of worship
Name	Image	Location	Denomination/ Affiliation	Grade	Notes	Refs
Brasted Baptist Chapel		Brasted; 51.2754°N 0.1045°E	Baptist	–	John Wills designed this in 1886, adopting the Gothic Revival style and using "unusual fenestration". R. Durtnell & Sons was the builder of the red- and white-brick chapel, which cost £750 and superseded a Baptist school and lecture hall. It fell out of religious use by 2003.	
St Saviour's Church		Chiddingstone Causeway; 51.1986°N 0.1715°E	Anglican	–	This was built in about 1875 to serve the village. When St Luke's Church was erected next to it, the building became surplus to requirements and was moved further along the road to serve as the village hall—a function it has had since about 1902.	
Chipstead Chapel		Chipstead; 51.2845°N 0.1521°E	Methodist	II	Now a house, this was apparently "used for storage" at the time of its listing by English Heritage in 1994. They describe it as a former Nonconformist chapel, and the 1895–96 Ordnance Survey map shows it as belonging to the Bible Christian Church. Most of the façade is stuccoed, but the rear is timber-framed-a feature which survives inside. The interior dates from no later than the early 17th century. The steep roof has bargeboards and tiles.	
Trinity Chapel		Cowden; 51.1450°N 0.0934°E	Presbyterian	–	A simple brick-built Vernacular-style chapel of 1894, this served its Presbyterian congregation until 1958 and has been a house, St Andrew's Lodge, since then.	
St John the Evangelist's Church		Dunton Green; 51.2987°N 0.1628°E	Anglican	–	Local architect M.T. Potter designed this church for the village in 1889–90. It was made redundant in 1987 and has been in commercial and industrial use since then, latterly as a veterinary surgery. Brick, Bath Stone and slate were used, and the style is Early English Gothic Revival.	
Bethel Free Church		Dunton Green; 51.2968°N 0.1647°E	Assemblies of God	–	This was built as a Congregational chapel in 1873 by Swanley resident Mr Joynson, and was registered for marriages in October 1880. After that community moved to the new Dunton Green Free Church nearby in 1937, the yellow- and red-brick building passed to the Assemblies of God Pentecostal denomination. In January 2012 it was leased to an organisation called Faithworks.	
Ebenezer Chapel		Edenbridge; 51.1974°N 0.0645°E	Independent	II	John Tyler founded this weatherboarded chapel in central Edenbridge in 1808 as a meeting place for Independent Calvinists. Various pastors served it, and it later became a Strict Baptist chapel aligned to the Gospel Standard movement. It is now a community centre and café.	
Four Elms Congregational Church		Four Elms; 51.2164°N 0.0999°E	Congregational	II		
Goathurst Mission Chapel		Goathurst Common, Ide Hill; 51.2500°N 0.1426°E	Anglican	–	This was served from the parish church at Ide Hill and was "entirely supported by Mrs Ryecroft", a local resident. It was in religious use from about 1895 until 1939; after World War II it was sold for residential conversion.	
Baptist Mission Chapel		Goathurst Common, Ide Hill; 51.2504°N 0.1424°E	Baptist	–		
Hartley United Reformed Church		Hartley; 51.3833°N 0.3060°E	United Reformed Church	–	This single-storey church building with an attached hall held its first service on 15 September 1934, but it was advertised for sale and potential redevelopment in 2011. Its marriage registration (as a Congregational church) dated from June 1936.	
Hextable Bethel		Hextable; 51.4132°N 0.1789°E	Assemblies of God	–	This building on Claremont Road was registered for marriages in July 1941. It later became the Bethel Centre, home of PCCA Christian Childcare; in a planning application submitted in 2011 requesting permission to demolish the building (which was refused), it was stated that the premises had been used as offices for "the last 10 years".	
Leigh Evangelical Free Church		Leigh; 51.1954°N 0.2125°E	Evangelical	II	George Devey's Perpendicular Gothic Revival building of 1871 was also used as a school and has housed three different congregations. By 1975 it had become a Royal British Legion hall, a function it still fulfils. Originally a non-denominational mission hall supported by Samuel Morley, it passed to the Church of England after his death and was later an Evangelical church. The red- and blue-brick and stone building is supported by buttresses, including to its side porch. The roof is of slate.	
St Paulinus' Church Centre		Marlpit Hill, Edenbridge; 51.2127°N 0.0603°E	Anglican	–		
Marsh Green Mission Church		Marsh Green; 51.1797°N 0.0577°E	Anglican	–	This dates from around 1929 and was within the parish of Edenbridge when it was in religious use. It is now a house.	
Otford Wesleyan Chapel		Otford; 51.3128°N 0.1857°E	Methodist	–		
Seal Bible Christian Church		Seal; 51.2887°N 0.2221°E	Methodist	–	Designed in the Renaissance Revival style in 1881 and provided for the Bible Christian Church, this was in use by a group called the Seal Baptist Mission by 1984 but is now a house. The walls are predominantly yellow-brick with some red brickwork.	
Otford Lane Mission Church		Sepham Heath; 51.3245°N 0.1466°E	Anglican	–	The church was in Shoreham parish and was provided for worshippers based at the many smallholdings in the area. It was in use until 1985. Some fittings were moved to St Margaret's Church at Halstead thereafter.	
Sevenoaks Bible Christian Chapel		Sevenoaks; 51.2874°N 0.1947°E	Methodist	–	This red-brick and terracotta chapel, with pinnacles and lancet windows, was provided for the Bible Christian Church in 1882. Reregistered for Methodists in 1942 after the Methodist Union, it then closed in 1961 and became a Masonic lodge.	
Sevenoaks Wesleyan Methodist Chapel		Sevenoaks; 51.2710°N 0.1922°E	Methodist	–	The Drive Methodist Church replaced this centrally located building in the Market Square. Designed by William Willmer Pocock in 1852, it was an Early English Gothic Revival chapel of Kentish Ragstone. A restaurant and shops now occupy the premises.	
Gospel Hall		Sevenoaks Weald; 51.2371°N 0.1912°E	Brethren	–	The building is Vernacular in style and is linked to a contemporary house. Dating from 1875, it was still in use well into the 20th century but has now been incorporated into the house.	
St Edward the Confessor's Church		Sevenoaks Weald; 51.2346°N 0.1845°E	Roman Catholic	–	This church was registered for marriages in March 1967 but was closed and had its certification cancelled in December 2009.	
Shoreham Baptist Chapel		Shoreham; 51.3372°N 0.1790°E	Baptist	–	This simple weatherboarded chapel on Crown Road served the village between 1896 and 1982, and was subsequently converted into a house. It retains the flèche on its roof. Extensions were made seven years after it opened.	
Penshurst United Reformed Church		Smart's Hill, Penshurst; 51.1565°N 0.1753°E	United Reformed Church	–	Congregationalists in the Penshurst area rented a building described as a "skittle alley" until this chapel was built for £250 in 1866. Registered the following year, it was licensed for worship for 110 years but is now a house. The façade is stuccoed, the walls are of brick and all windows are lancets.	
Fairhaven Mission		Speed Gate, Fawkham; 51.3773°N 0.2612°E	Non-denominational	–	Writing in 1994, Horton Kirby and South Darenth Parish Council stated that "until recently" this timber building on Mussenden Lane near Fawkham was "regularly used for services". It had previously been a café, and was subsequently used for storage.	
Wesleyan Chapel		Swanley Village; 51.4041°N 0.2012°E	Methodist	–	This building dates from 1817 but has been "spoilt by [an] insensitive" extension at the front since its conversion into a house. It was still marked as a chapel in the 1896–97 Ordnance Survey map, but by the 1909 edition it was no longer named.	
Twitton Mission Church		Twitton; 51.3135°N 0.1678°E	Anglican	–	This village west of Otford was served by an iron mission room from 1900 until 1982. It was extended in 1950 and rededicated as the Church of the Good Shepherd.	
Ruins of Maplescombe Chapel		West Kingsdown; 51.3513°N 0.2417°E	Pre-Reformation	II		

== Bibliography ==
- Homan, Roger (1984). The Victorian Churches of Kent. Chichester: Phillimore & Co. ISBN 0-85033-466-7.
- Newman, John (1969). West Kent and the Weald. Buildings of England (1st ed.). Harmondsworth: Penguin Books. ISBN 978-0-300-09614-9.
- Newman, John (2012). Kent: West and the Weald. Buildings of England. Yale University Press. ISBN 978-0-300-18509-6.
- Somers-Cocks, Henry L.; Boyson, V.F. (1912). Edenbridge. Edenbridge: Edenbridge Chronicle Office.
- Various authors (1994). Horton Kirby and South Darenth: Pictures and Memories of 100 Years 1894–1994 (PDF). Horton Kirby and South Darenth Parish Council. Archived from the original (PDF) on 3 March 2016.
