= Chipstead =

Chipstead may refer to:

== Places ==
- Chipstead, Kent
- Chipstead, Surrey

== Sports ==
- Chipstead F.C., a non-league association football club in Chipstead, Surrey, England
