= DNG =

DNG may refer to:

== Science and technology ==
- Digital Negative, a digital photography raw image format
- Double negative metamaterial, a material in which both permittivity and magnetic permeability are less than zero
- Dienogest, a progestin medication

== Railway stations ==
- Dandenong railway station (station code), Victoria, Australia
- Dunton Green railway station (station code), Kent, England

== Other uses ==
- Delaware National Guard, a state agency of the government of Delaware
- DetonatioN Gaming, a Japanese esports organization
- Degrassi: The Next Generation, a Canadian television series
- Dungan language (ISO 639-3 code)

== See also ==
- Dolce & Gabbana (D&G), an Italian luxury fashion house
