= Brasted railway station =

Disused railway station in England

Brasted
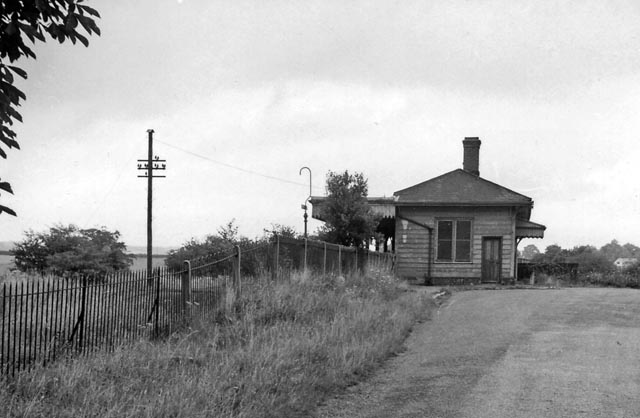
- The station in 1962

General information
- Location: Brasted, Sevenoaks; England
- Coordinates: 51.283°N 0.105°E
- Grid reference: TQ467558
- Platforms: 1

Other information
- Status: Disused

History
- Pre-grouping: South Eastern Railway; SECR
- Post-grouping: Southern Railway; Southern Region of British Railways

Key dates
- 1881: Opened
- 1961: Closed
Location

Brasted is a disused intermediate railway station in Brasted, Kent on the closed Westerham Valley branch line. The station closed in 1961 and the site is covered by the carriageway of the M25 motorway that was constructed along the route of the disused railway.

== History ==
The station was built by the Westerham Valley Railway (WVR) opened on 3 July 1881. The WVR was taken over by the South Eastern Railway in August 1881 which became the South Eastern and Chatham Railway in 1899. Operations passed to the Southern Railway upon the railway grouping in 1923 and thereafter on nationalisation of the railways to the Southern Region of British Railways which closed the Westerham Branch on 30 October 1961 due to low patronage.

The line was the subject of a revival/preservation attempt which was unsuccessful as the Association could not raise the required funds to rebuild a bridge at Chevening which had been demolished to widen the A21 Sevenoaks Bypass. The track was lifted by 1967 and the station demolished in 1977 during construction of the M25.

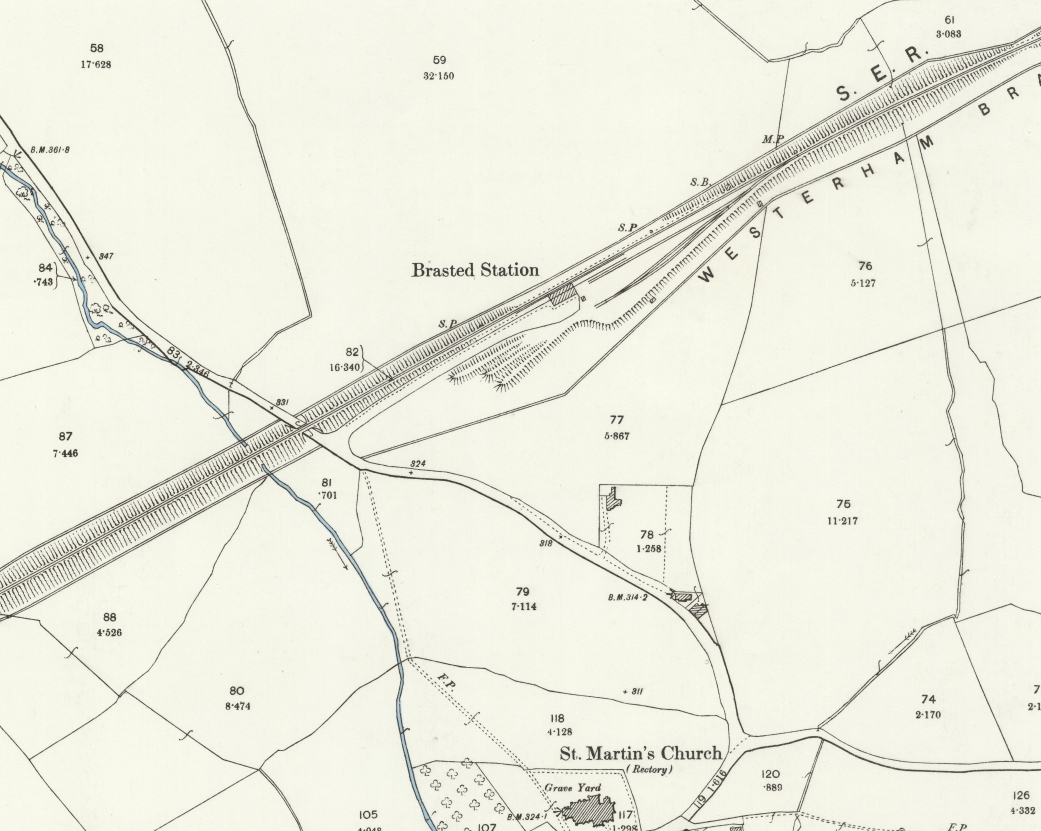
Brasted railway station, 1896 on an Ordnance Survey map

The Westerham branch in relation to other railway lines in Kent

The station approach to Brasted is now a works road leading on to the M25, with the actual accessway covering the site of the former booking hall. Just beyond that area is the former station goods yard, formerly occupied by a local coal merchant, which appears derelict and is closed off by steel gates. The stationmaster's house has survived and lies to the south.

== Other stations ==
- Westerham
- Chevening Halt
- Dunton Green

Preceding station	Disused railways	Following station
Westerham	British Rail; Southern Region; Westerham branch	Chevening Halt
