= Listed buildings in Brasted =

Civil Parish in Kent, England

Brasted is a village and civil parish in the Sevenoaks District of Kent, England. It contains one grade I, one grade II* and 65 grade II listed buildings that are recorded in the National Heritage List for England.

This list is based on the information retrieved online from Historic England.

== Key ==
Grade	Criteria
I	Buildings that are of exceptional interest
II*	Particularly important buildings of more than special interest
II	Buildings that are of special interest

== Listing ==
Name	Grade	Location	Type	Completed (Note: The date given is the date used by Historic England as significant for the initial building or that of an important part in the structure's description.)	Date designated	Grid ref. (Note: The grid reference is based on the British national grid reference system, sometimes known as OSGB36, used by the Ordnance Survey.) Geo-coordinates	Notes	Entry number (Note: The "List Entry Number" is a unique number assigned to each listed building and scheduled monument by Historic England.)	Image	Wikidata
Former Stables and Coach House and Linking Wall and Mounting Block to the South West of Foxwold	II				29 October 2001	TQ4643953476; 51°15′42″N 0°05′51″E		1389465	Upload Photo	Q26668899
Foxwold	II				15 October 2001	TQ4649453542; 51°15′44″N 0°05′54″E		1455408	Upload Photo	Q66479579
Barn to South West of Outridge	II	Brasted Chart			16 January 1975	TQ4636352625; 51°15′14″N 0°05′46″E		1085841	Upload Photo	Q26374524
Oasthouses and Drying Shed to South West of Outridge	II	Brasted Chart			16 January 1975	TQ4637152605; 51°15′14″N 0°05′46″E		1249480	Upload Photo	Q26541611
Outridge	II	Brasted Chart			16 January 1975	TQ4634652654; 51°15′15″N 0°05′45″E		1263743	Upload Photo	Q26554513
Brasted Hill Farm House	II	Brasted Hill, Brasted Hill Farm			16 January 1975	TQ4627157401; 51°17′49″N 0°05′48″E		1083904	Upload Photo	Q26367111
Church of St Martin	II*	Church Road			10 September 1954	TQ4686155490; 51°16′47″N 0°06′15″E		1346417	Church of St Martin More images	Q17545922
Mill Farm House	II	Church Road, Mill Farm			16 January 1975	TQ4681255391; 51°16′44″N 0°06′13″E		1249193	Upload Photo	Q26541353
1-5, Elliots Lane	II	1-5, Elliots Lane			16 January 1975	TQ4723555097; 51°16′34″N 0°06′34″E		1039586	Upload Photo	Q26291381
The Phillippines	II	Emmetts Lane, Ide Hill			21 March 2001	TQ4736952771; 51°15′18″N 0°06′38″E		1246938	Upload Photo	Q26539297
Kibbles Green Cottage	II	Four Elms			16 January 1975	TQ4716449362; 51°13′28″N 0°06′22″E		1336439	Upload Photo	Q26620929
17, High Street, Kent Cottage, Cromers Cottage, and the House and the Shop	II	17, High Street, Westerham, TN16 1JA			16 January 1975	TQ4720355146; 51°16′35″N 0°06′33″E		1085852	Upload Photo	Q26374584
Alms Row Cottages	II	10, High Street			10 September 1954	TQ4700955053; 51°16′32″N 0°06′22″E		1085839	Upload Photo	Q26374516
Alms Row Cottages	II	1-4, High Street			10 September 1954	TQ4696755054; 51°16′32″N 0°06′20″E		1085840	Upload Photo	Q26374519
Alms Row Cottages	II	5 and 6, High Street			10 September 1954	TQ4698355054; 51°16′32″N 0°06′21″E		1249449	Upload Photo	Q26681319
Alms Row Cottages	II	7-9, High Street			10 September 1954	TQ4699055056; 51°16′33″N 0°06′21″E		1336437	Upload Photo	Q26893500
Antique Shop	II	High Street			16 January 1975	TQ4723555128; 51°16′35″N 0°06′34″E		1336431	Upload Photo	Q26620922
Barton's Cottages	II	1-4, High Street			16 January 1975	TQ4725355162; 51°16′36″N 0°06′35″E		1346420	Upload Photo	Q26629969
Barton's Cottages Swan's	II	5, High Street			16 January 1975	TQ4726655165; 51°16′36″N 0°06′36″E		1039551	Upload Photo	Q26291348
Brasted House and Wall to East West Cottage and Wall to Front and West	II	High Street			16 January 1975	TQ4713555124; 51°16′35″N 0°06′29″E		1085831	Upload Photo	Q26374474
Brasted Place and Saxon Cross	I	High Street			10 September 1954	TQ4766854996; 51°16′30″N 0°06′56″E		1336432	Upload Photo	Q17529911
Brasted War Memorial	II	High Street, Westerham, TN16 1JA			10 February 2017	TQ4701955077; 51°16′33″N 0°06′23″E		1441330	Upload Photo	Q66478299
C15 Tucke Shoppe Premises Occupied by Le Watts	II	High Street			16 January 1975	TQ4723155128; 51°16′35″N 0°06′34″E		1249430	Upload Photo	Q26541564
Combe Bank Lodge	II	High Street			16 January 1975	TQ4751255221; 51°16′37″N 0°06′49″E		1083905	Upload Photo	Q26367116
Darenth Cottage	II	High Street, Westerham, TN16 1JJ			16 January 1975	TQ4729355172; 51°16′36″N 0°06′37″E		1346419	Upload Photo	Q26629968
Dilgerts and Eversley	II	High Street, Westerham, TN16 1JJ			16 January 1975	TQ4730155174; 51°16′36″N 0°06′38″E		1039550	Upload Photo	Q26291347
Forecourt Wall to the Mount House	II	High Street			10 September 1954	TQ4718355119; 51°16′34″N 0°06′31″E		1249445	Upload Photo	Q26541578
Garden Walls to West of the Mount House	II	High Street			10 September 1954	TQ4710555080; 51°16′33″N 0°06′27″E		1085838	Upload Photo	Q26374511
Mandeys South Down House	II	High Street			10 September 1954	TQ4729255140; 51°16′35″N 0°06′37″E		1249407	Upload Photo	Q26541542
Markwick	II	High Street			16 January 1975	TQ4728155170; 51°16′36″N 0°06′37″E		1083908	Upload Photo	Q26367131
Mount Cottage Premises Occupied by Mjp Limited	II	High Street			16 January 1975	TQ4721055124; 51°16′35″N 0°06′33″E		1249435	Upload Photo	Q26541569
North Boundary Wall to Grounds of Brasted Place	II	High Street			16 January 1975	TQ4748755193; 51°16′36″N 0°06′47″E		1085834	Upload Photo	Q26374490
Old Forge Cottage	II	1-3, High Street			16 January 1975	TQ4721855158; 51°16′36″N 0°06′33″E		1083909	Upload Photo	Q26367137
Park Farmhouse	II	High Street			16 January 1975	TQ4609055125; 51°16′36″N 0°05′35″E		1085832	Upload Photo	Q26374479
Premises Occupied by Ml Maudsley Premises Occupied by Westminster Bank Roughwood	II	High Street			16 January 1975	TQ4725155134; 51°16′35″N 0°06′35″E		1336435	Upload Photo	Q26620925
Pump in Middle of Village Green	II	High Street			16 January 1975	TQ4735655188; 51°16′36″N 0°06′40″E		1083907	Upload Photo	Q26367126
Rectory Lodge	II	High Street			10 September 1954	TQ4731855140; 51°16′35″N 0°06′38″E		1085836	Upload Photo	Q26374501
Screen Wall with Entrance Gates to West of Combe Bank Lodge	II	High Street			16 January 1975	TQ4750255218; 51°16′37″N 0°06′48″E		1373947	Upload Photo	Q26654862
Section of Stable Building with Clock Tower and Cupola to North West of Brasted Place the Clock House	II	High Street			16 January 1975	TQ4751455161; 51°16′35″N 0°06′49″E		1336433	Upload Photo	Q26620923
Stone Urns to South of Brasted Place	II	High Street			10 September 1954	TQ4766754978; 51°16′29″N 0°06′56″E		1085833	Upload Photo	Q26374485
The Green	II	7, High Street			16 January 1975	TQ4735755206; 51°16′37″N 0°06′41″E		1083906	Upload Photo	Q26367122
The Green the Old Manor House, the Green	II	1, High Street			10 September 1954	TQ4734755207; 51°16′37″N 0°06′40″E		1039549	Upload Photo	Q26291346
The Lodge and Entrance Gateway to Brasted Place	II	High Street			16 January 1975	TQ4746155184; 51°16′36″N 0°06′46″E		1336434	Upload Photo	Q26620924
The Mount House Wall Running West from South West Corner of Mount House	II	High Street			10 September 1954	TQ4719655112; 51°16′34″N 0°06′32″E		1336436	Upload Photo	Q26620926
The Pharmacy	II	High Street			3 July 1973	TQ4722055125; 51°16′35″N 0°06′33″E		1085837	Upload Photo	Q26374506
The Village House	II	High Street			10 September 1954	TQ4707355072; 51°16′33″N 0°06′26″E		1249447	Upload Photo	Q26541580
The White House	II	High Street			10 September 1954	TQ4732855148; 51°16′35″N 0°06′39″E		1085835	The White House More images	Q26374496
White Hart Cottages	II	1-6, High Street			16 January 1975	TQ4742555201; 51°16′37″N 0°06′44″E		1346418	White Hart Cottages More images	Q26629967
K6 Telephone Kiosk at Junction with Toys Hill Outside Village Hall	II	Puddleduck Lane			9 March 1989	TQ4696651289; 51°14′31″N 0°06′15″E		1244260	Upload Photo	Q26536889
1-5, Rectory Lane	II	1-5, Rectory Lane			16 January 1975	TQ4732955225; 51°16′38″N 0°06′39″E		1249454	Upload Photo	Q26541587
The Old Rectory	II	Rectory Lane			16 January 1975	TQ4714955435; 51°16′45″N 0°06′30″E		1336438	Upload Photo	Q26620928
Tan House	II	Tan House, Toys Hill			16 January 1975	TQ4762850313; 51°13′58″N 0°06′47″E		1263724	Upload Photo	Q26554495
K6 Telephone Kiosk	II	The Green			11 January 1989	TQ4736955187; 51°16′36″N 0°06′41″E		1272471	Upload Photo	Q26562304
Swaylands Cottage, the Green Swaylands, the Green	II	The Green, High Street			16 January 1975	TQ4736355207; 51°16′37″N 0°06′41″E		1039548	Upload Photo	Q26291345
Ivy House, the Old Bakery and Fig Tree Cottage	II	The Old Bakery And Fig Tree Cottage, High Street, Westerham, TN16 1JA			16 January 1975	TQ4723855162; 51°16′36″N 0°06′34″E		1263799	Upload Photo	Q26554564
Chartlands Corner Cottage	II	Toys Hill			16 January 1975	TQ4695451246; 51°14′29″N 0°06′14″E		1249483	Upload Photo	Q26541614
Former Threshing Barn to South of Obriss Farmhouse	II	Toys Hill, Obriss Farm			16 January 1975	TQ4661650063; 51°13′51″N 0°05′55″E		1085844	Upload Photo	Q26374541
Obriss Farmhouse	II	Toys Hill, Obriss Farm			16 January 1975	TQ4660450105; 51°13′53″N 0°05′54″E		1263722	Upload Photo	Q26554493
Old Farm Cottage	II	Toys Hill			16 January 1975	TQ4718951520; 51°14′38″N 0°06′26″E		1249490	Upload Photo	Q26541620
Scords Farmhouse	II	Toys Hill			16 January 1975	TQ4741251631; 51°14′41″N 0°06′38″E		1336440	Upload Photo	Q26620930
Smoke House to Rear of Obriss Farmhouse	II	Toys Hill, Obriss Farm			7 July 1976	TQ4660650114; 51°13′53″N 0°05′54″E		1272526	Upload Photo	Q26562358
Toys Hill Farmhouse	II	Toys Hill			16 January 1975	TQ4716151488; 51°14′37″N 0°06′25″E		1085843	Upload Photo	Q26374535
Toyswood Cottage	II	Toys Hill			16 January 1975	TQ4726750343; 51°14′00″N 0°06′29″E		1085845	Upload Photo	Q26374546
Village Hall	II	Toys Hill			12 May 1999	TQ4695151287; 51°14′31″N 0°06′14″E		1387209	Upload Photo	Q26666868
Wellhead Canopy	II	Toys Hill			16 January 1975	TQ4683551203; 51°14′28″N 0°06′08″E		1085842	Upload Photo	Q26374529
The Robertson War Memorial Bequest Obelisk, Weardale	II	Weardale, Toys Hill, TN16 1QG			12 October 2016	TQ4678851802; 51°14′47″N 0°06′06″E		1438496	Upload Photo	Q66477983

== See also ==
- Grade I listed buildings in Kent
- Grade II* listed buildings in Kent

== Sources ==
- Newman, John (2012) [1969], Kent: West and the Weald, The Buildings of England, New Haven and London: Yale University Press, ISBN 978-0-300-18509-6
