= Chipstead, Kent =

Village in Kent, England

Coordinates: 51.285250°N 0.149050°E

Chipstead
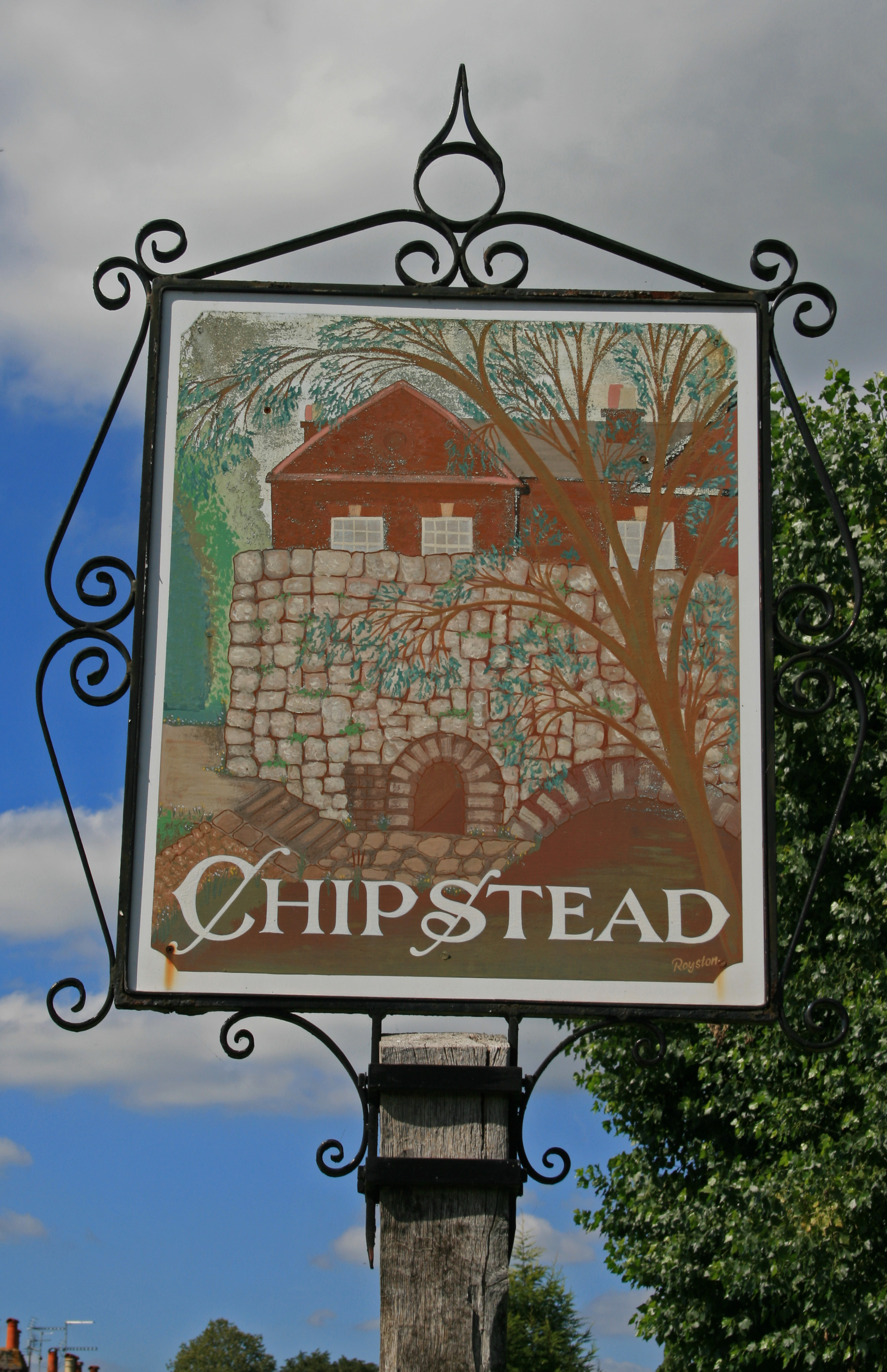
- Chipstead Village sign

- Location within Kent
- Civil parish: Chevening
- District: Sevenoaks
- Shire county: Kent
- Region: South East
- Country: England
- Sovereign state: United Kingdom
- Post town: Sevenoaks
- Postcode district: TN13
- Police: Kent
- Fire: Kent
- Ambulance: South East Coast
- UK Parliament: Sevenoaks

Chipstead is a small village within the parish of Chevening in the Sevenoaks District of Kent, England. It lies just west of the town of Sevenoaks and just off the A21 and A25 roads. It is also within a short distance of the M25 motorway, though not visible from it.

Although small in size, it has various attractions and features, including traditional southern English village architecture and a large lake. The village has two public houses: the "George and Dragon", a 16th-century coaching inn on the High Street, and the "Bricklayers Arms" on Chevening Road opposite the lake.

Chipstead Lake (also known as Longford Lake) is man-made, the result of gravel extraction during the 20th century. It has an area of 30 hectares (74 acres) and is used for:

- angling by Homesdale Angling Society
- sailing by Chipstead Sailing Club

The Chapel of the Good Shepherd is an Anglican chapel of ease to Chevening parish church. A 19th-century Grade II-listed former chapel (now a house) in the village centre was used by the Bible Christian Church.

Chipstead was served by Chevening Halt railway station on the Westerham Valley Branch Line running between Westerham and Dunton Green; it opened in 1881 and closed in 1961. The closest railway station is now Sevenoaks. Chipstead village is now served by the 401 Sevenoaks-Westerham bus and the 452 Sevenoaks Station Circular commuter bus.

Chipstead is a comfortable, quiet community. There is a thriving residents' association, which has voiced opinions over issues such as traffic control in the area.

== See also ==
- List of places of worship in Sevenoaks (district)
