= John Turton =

John Turton (15 November 1735 – 14 April 1806) was an English physician.

== Life ==
Born in Staffordshire, Turton became the doctor of King George III of Great Britain and treated that monarch during bouts of his madness. His house, Brasted Place, was designed by architect Robert Adam and is one of the finest country houses in Kent. He was elected a Fellow of the Royal Society in November 1763.

He died at Brasted Place and was buried in Brasted churchyard. His heavily Grecian memorial tablet in St. Martin’s Church, Brasted, Kent, features Doric columns beside the inscription and a sarcophagus. On the latter books and serpent-entwined staff. It was designed and carved by the renowned Sir Richard Westmacott, who also did within the same church a nearby memorial to Mary Turton (d.1810), which featured a "relief of a classically robed man leaning pensively on an altar ‘To Gratitude.’"
