= Westerham railway station =

Former railway station in England

Coordinates: 51.27036°N 0.07431°E

Westerham
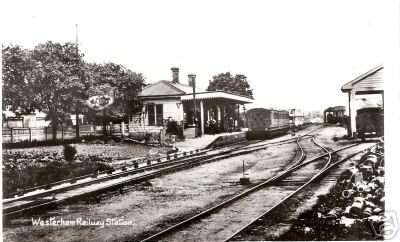

General information
- Location: Westerham, Sevenoaks; England
- Grid reference: TQ448544
- Platforms: 1

Other information
- Status: Disused

History
- Pre-grouping: South Eastern Railway; SECR
- Post-grouping: Southern Railway; Southern Region of British Railways

Key dates
- 3 July 1881: Opened
- 30 October 1961: Closed
Location

The Westerham branch in relation to other railway lines in Kent

Westerham railway station served the village of Westerham in Kent from 1881 until its closure in 1961.

== History ==
No railway was ever constructed all the way between Sevenoaks and Redhill to parallel what is now the A25 road and the Pilgrims' Way. Reasons for this may include: a) the Redhill to Tonbridge Line had been built quite early in railway history and served the settlements between Redhill and Godstone, b) the difficult choice between boggy land in the valley bottom and the gradients encountered on the A25 route at Limpsfield and Nutfield, c) the "pull" of London which meant that the emphasis was on radial routes from the capital.

However, in 1881 the Westerham Valley Railway Company built the Westerham Valley Branch Line from the South Eastern Main Line at Dunton Green to Westerham with one intermediate station at Brasted. The branch was built as single track with provision for double track as an ambitious extension to Oxted was envisaged. The South Eastern Railway took over the company soon after construction, itself becoming part of the South Eastern and Chatham Railway in 1899. The Southern Railway took over responsibility for the line upon the railway grouping in 1923, followed by the Southern Region of British Railways upon nationalisation in 1948.

The line was ostensibly closed in October 1961 as being unremunerative due to low patronage and was the subject of a preservation attempt by the Westerham Valley Railway Association. The Association had succeeded in obtaining a lease of Westerham Station from British Railways in April 1962 and had carried out maintenance works. Just after this it was purchased from British Railways by Kent County Council under the terms of compulsory purchase; the Council demolished the road bridge at Chevening in order to build the A21 Sevenoaks Bypass. Whilst the Council was happy to lease the line to the Association this was on condition that the Association had to raise the required funds to construct an overbridge for the now widened A21 at Chevening. The Association was unable to meet the costs of constructing the overbridge and the Council promptly in-filled the section, effectively cutting the line in two. The station buildings were later demolished and track lifted by March 1967. Some 15 year later in 1976 the Southern section of the London Orbital motorway, the M25 was built over a proportion of the old line..

Preceding station	Disused railways	Following station
Terminus	British Railways; Southern Region; Westerham branch	Brasted

== Present day ==
The "Westerham Flyer" was the Class H 0-4-4T No. 31518 locomotive which pulled the morning trains on the last day of service on Saturday 26 October 1961. The Flyers Way industrial estate covers the footprint of the former station site and goods yard and is named after this locomotive, and backs on to original railway cottages. There is no plaque to commemorate the station's history, the only reminder of it being the base of the goods yard crane which is situated on a grass verge near the entrance to the site. It is, however, possible to trace the line of the trackbed eastwards around the site, past the railway cottages on an embankment and into nearby allotments.

== Other stations ==
- Brasted
- Chevening Halt
- Dunton Green

== See also ==
- List of closed railway stations in Britain
