= Dunton Green =

Village in Kent, England

Coordinates: 51.29648°N 0.17160°E

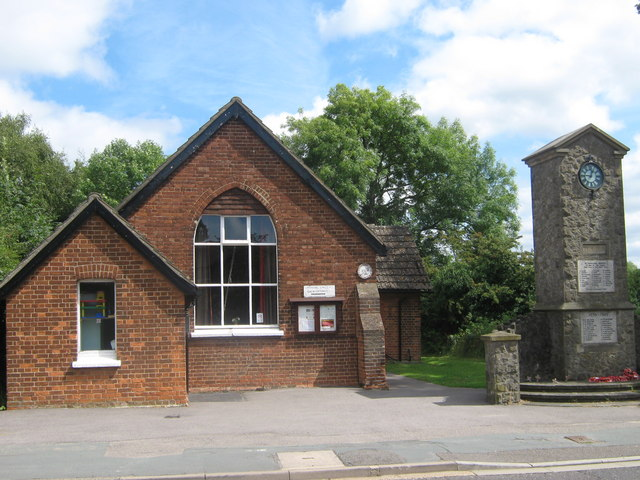
- Village Hall and War Memorial

- Location within Kent
- Population: 2,360 (2011 Census)
- OS grid reference: TQ515575
- District: Sevenoaks
- Shire county: Kent
- Region: South East
- Country: England
- Sovereign state: United Kingdom
- Post town: SEVENOAKS
- Postcode district: TN13, TN14
- Police: Kent
- Fire: Kent
- Ambulance: South East Coast
- UK Parliament: Sevenoaks

Dunton Green is a small village and civil parish in the Sevenoaks District of Kent, England. It lies in the valley of the River Darent, 3 miles (4.8 km) north of the town of Sevenoaks. Dunton Green is designated as being part of the Kent Downs area of outstanding natural beauty, due to its proximity to the North Downs. The original ecclesiastical church parish of Dunton Green was part of Otford parish. The former parish church was dedicated to St John the Divine.

From at least the 17th century, Dunton Green was a centre for making bricks and tiles. In 1862, the Dunton Green Brick, Tile and Pottery Works was established: a large concern with clayholes or pits, kilns and an engine house. While clay was being dug for, many fossils were discovered.

== Places of worship ==
St John the Divine's Church, the Anglican parish church, was designed by M.T. Potter and built in 1889–90 using local bricks. It was declared redundant in 1987 after congregations declined, and is now in commercial use. The village Anglican church is now St Mary's, Riverhead and its distinctive green copper spire can be seen rising up in the distance from the village. Dunton Green Free Church opened in 1873 in a building which later became the Bethel Free Church, associated with the Assemblies of God Pentecostal denomination. The Free Church moved to a new building on Station Road, opened in September 1937. Still with its original name, it remains open and is a member of the Congregational Federation.

== Transport ==
Dunton Green railway station provides train services every 30 mins to London Bridge, Waterloo East and London Charing Cross, taking around 40–50 mins.

Otford Station is about a 5-minute drive away, and has fast trains running every 30 mins to London Victoria and stopping services running every 30 mins to London Blackfriars.

There are also bus services to central Sevenoaks and surrounding villages. Go Coach route 3 serves the village providing links to Central Sevenoaks with the 3 running to Knockholt, Halstead and Orpington. Dunton Green is not served by buses on weekends, however Go Coach routes 1 and 8 can be caught nearby at Riverhead Tesco down the road. Route 1 provides links to Westerham and Brasted whilst route 8 provides local links around Sevenoaks. On Sundays, route 401 operated by Go Coach Hire can be caught from Riverhead Tesco and provides links to Westerham and Tonbridge.

== Leisure and facilities ==
Sevenoaks Information provides a comprehensive events diary for Dunton Green and the surrounding area.

Dunton Green Community Forum also has an events calendar. Add your own event and discuss local news.

The Dunton Green Social Club offers entertainment in the village most weekends.

National and regional walking trails pass through the village, and there are various local footpaths The Darent Valley Path is accessed from Rye Lane and follows the course of the River Darent from Sevenoaks to Dartford. There is also a local footpath that follows the north of Chipstead Lake and goes to Chipstead. The North Downs Way passes the northern end of the village at London Road. Heading west will take one along the North Downs to Betsoms Hill, Titsey, and eventually on to Farnham. Heading east leads to Otford, up to Wrotham, and eventually on to the White Cliffs of Dover.

Along the London Road there are many shops, businesses, pubs, and restaurants. The main village arcade is situated between Dunton Green Primary School and Lennard Road. There are three pubs; The Miners Arms, The Dukes Head, and The Rose and Crown – all are situated along the London Road.

The nearest local Library is in Riverhead and is run by Kent County Council; it has specific week day hours of opening. One can order library items online for collection, and there are telecottage facilities available.

Digital television has been available for aerials pointing east in Dunton Green since 2006 from the Blue Bell Hill Transmitter for Kent & Sussex TV transmissions, which is also now broadcasting in HD.

== See also ==
- List of places of worship in Sevenoaks
- Listed buildings in Dunton Green
