= Listed buildings in Riverhead, Kent =

Civil Parish in Kent, England

Riverhead is a village and civil parish in the Sevenoaks District of Kent, England. It contains 42 grade II listed buildings that are recorded in the National Heritage List for England.

This list is based on the information retrieved online from Historic England.

== Key ==
Grade	Criteria
I	Buildings that are of exceptional interest
II*	Particularly important buildings of more than special interest
II	Buildings that are of special interest

== Listing ==
Name	Grade	Location	Type	Completed (Note: The date given is the date used by Historic England as significant for the initial building or that of an important part in the structure's description.)	Date designated	Grid ref. (Note: The grid reference is based on the British national grid reference system, sometimes known as OSGB36, used by the Ordnance Survey.) Geo-coordinates	Notes	Entry number (Note: The "List Entry Number" is a unique number assigned to each listed building and scheduled monument by Historic England.)	Image	Wikidata
6, Amherst Hill	II	6, Amherst Hill			10 September 1954	TQ5152755978; 51°16′58″N 0°10′17″E		1272895	6, Amherst Hill More images	Q26562697
8, Amherst Hill	II	8, Amherst Hill			10 September 1954	TQ5152455985; 51°16′58″N 0°10′17″E		1243282	8, Amherst Hill More images	Q26535966
Amherst Cottage	II	Amherst Hill, Riverjead			16 January 1975	TQ5151755950; 51°16′57″N 0°10′16″E		1272967	Upload Photo	Q26562762
Barrow Way Barroway	II	Amherst Hill			16 January 1975	TQ5157555985; 51°16′58″N 0°10′19″E		1243387	Upload Photo	Q26536067
Dovecot in Garden to West of the Riverhead Public House	II	Amherst Hill			16 January 1975	TQ5142755998; 51°16′59″N 0°10′12″E		1243396	Upload Photo	Q26536075
Old Outbuildings to North West of the Riverhead Public House	II	Amherst Hill			16 January 1975	TQ5140456007; 51°16′59″N 0°10′11″E		1243284	Upload Photo	Q26535968
The Riverhead Public House	II	Amherst Hill			16 January 1975	TQ5148755998; 51°16′59″N 0°10′15″E		1272965	The Riverhead Public House More images	Q26562760
Wall Running Along Road South of Turning to Montreal Road	II	Amherst Hill			16 January 1975	TQ5154755874; 51°16′55″N 0°10′18″E		1272903	Upload Photo	Q26562704
Wall Running East-west to Form the South Boundary of Lands of the Riverhead Public House	II	Amherst Hill			16 January 1975	TQ5146755952; 51°16′57″N 0°10′14″E		1243390	Upload Photo	Q26536069
Wall to West of the Riverhead Public House	II	Amherst Hill			16 January 1975	TQ5147055994; 51°16′59″N 0°10′14″E		1243283	Upload Photo	Q26535967
Wall Running South, West South West and South Again from North West Corner of Lane Belonging to the Riverhead Public House	II	Amherst Hill			16 January 1975	TQ5140355990; 51°16′59″N 0°10′10″E		1272966	Upload Photo	Q26562761
Montreal Lodge	II	Brittain's Lane			16 January 1975	TQ5168355488; 51°16′42″N 0°10′24″E		1243285	Upload Photo	Q26535969
Retaining Wall Around Front of Montreal Lodge and Continuing Down Brittain's Lane	II	Brittain's Lane			16 January 1975	TQ5170455462; 51°16′41″N 0°10′25″E		1272908	Upload Photo	Q26562709
40-46, Chipstead Lane	II	40-46, Chipstead Lane			16 January 1975	TQ5124256140; 51°17′04″N 0°10′02″E		1272969	Upload Photo	Q26562764
48 and 50, Chipstead Lane	II	48 and 50, Chipstead Lane			16 January 1975	TQ5122856143; 51°17′04″N 0°10′02″E		1243289	Upload Photo	Q26535973
52 and 54, Chipstead Lane	II	52 and 54, Chipstead Lane			16 January 1975	TQ5121956142; 51°17′04″N 0°10′01″E		1272970	Upload Photo	Q26562765
84 and 86, Chipstead Lane	II	84 and 86, Chipstead Lane			16 January 1975	TQ5111756134; 51°17′03″N 0°09′56″E		1243290	Upload Photo	Q26535974
Cade House	II	2, Chipstead Lane			10 September 1954	TQ5137256093; 51°17′02″N 0°10′09″E		1243286	Upload Photo	Q26535970
Coach House to West of No 2 Wall West of No 2	II	Chipstead Lane			10 September 1954	TQ5134756098; 51°17′02″N 0°10′08″E		1243419	Upload Photo	Q26536098
Durham House	II	6, Chipstead Lane			16 January 1975	TQ5133456107; 51°17′02″N 0°10′07″E		1272968	Upload Photo	Q26562763
Stable Building to Rear of the Old Farmhouse	II	Chipstead Lane			16 January 1975	TQ5126856095; 51°17′02″N 0°10′04″E		1272939	Upload Photo	Q26562737
The Beehive Public House	II	Chipstead Lane			16 January 1975	TQ5127656132; 51°17′03″N 0°10′04″E		1243287	The Beehive Public House More images	Q26535971
The Old Cottage	II	Chipstead Lane			10 September 1954	TQ5129856101; 51°17′02″N 0°10′05″E		1272971	Upload Photo	Q26562766
The Old Farmhouse	II	Chipstead Lane			10 September 1954	TQ5129156104; 51°17′02″N 0°10′05″E		1243291	Upload Photo	Q26535975
Dibden Farmhouse	II	Dibden Lane, Dibden Farm			10 September 1954	TQ5145253822; 51°15′48″N 0°10′10″E		1243292	Upload Photo	Q26535976
1-4, Linden Square	II	1-4, Linden Square			16 January 1975	TQ5136656349; 51°17′10″N 0°10′09″E		1243293	Upload Photo	Q26535977
7, Linden Square	II	7, Linden Square			16 January 1975	TQ5139456326; 51°17′09″N 0°10′10″E		1243294	Upload Photo	Q26535978
Linden Cottage	II	5 and 6, Linden Square			16 January 1975	TQ5140156352; 51°17′10″N 0°10′11″E		1272879	Upload Photo	Q26562682
73 and 75, London Road	II	73 and 75, London Road			16 January 1975	TQ5129456404; 51°17′12″N 0°10′05″E		1243459	Upload Photo	Q26536133
Church of St Mary	II	London Road			10 September 1954	TQ5148356117; 51°17′03″N 0°10′15″E		1272880	Church of St Mary More images	Q26562683
Minerva House	II	54, London Road			16 January 1975	TQ5131756429; 51°17′13″N 0°10′07″E		1243295	Upload Photo	Q26535979
3 and 5, Maidstone Road	II	3 and 5, Maidstone Road			16 January 1975	TQ5142956229; 51°17′06″N 0°10′12″E		1243296	Upload Photo	Q26535980
Montreal Park Obelisk in Garden of Number 81	II	Marlborough Crescent			27 April 1998	TQ5120155062; 51°16′29″N 0°09′59″E		1119727	Upload Photo	Q26413027
7, the Square	II	7, The Square			16 January 1975	TQ5139056105; 51°17′02″N 0°10′10″E		1243297	Upload Photo	Q26535981
8, the Square	II	8, The Square			16 January 1975	TQ5138456114; 51°17′03″N 0°10′10″E		1243461	Upload Photo	Q26536135
Forecourt Railings and Entrance Arch to the Manor House	II	Worships Hill			16 January 1975	TQ5131956011; 51°16′59″N 0°10′06″E		1272884	Upload Photo	Q26562686
Forecourt Railings to Riverhead House	II	Worships Hill			16 January 1975	TQ5136956044; 51°17′00″N 0°10′09″E		1272940	Upload Photo	Q26562738
Manor House Cottage	II	3, Worships Hill			16 January 1975	TQ5135056049; 51°17′01″N 0°10′08″E		1272882	Upload Photo	Q26562685
Piece of Wall to South East of Riverhead House	II	Worships Hill			16 January 1975	TQ5139056028; 51°17′00″N 0°10′10″E		1243474	Upload Photo	Q26536148
Riverhead House	II	Worships Hill, TN13 2AP			10 September 1954	TQ5137156031; 51°17′00″N 0°10′09″E		1243300	Upload Photo	Q26535984
The Manor House Nursing Home	II	Worships Hill			10 September 1954	TQ5131556017; 51°17′00″N 0°10′06″E		1243299	Upload Photo	Q26535983
Wall to East and South of Coach House Building	II	Worships Hill			16 January 1975	TQ5141456024; 51°17′00″N 0°10′11″E		1243301	Upload Photo	Q26535985

== See also ==
- Grade I listed buildings in Kent
- Grade II* listed buildings in Kent

== Sources ==
- Newman, John (2012) [1969], Kent: West and the Weald, The Buildings of England, New Haven and London: Yale University Press, ISBN 978-0-300-18509-6
