= Sevenoaks Weald =

Village in Kent, England

Coordinates: 51.237892°N 0.191258°E

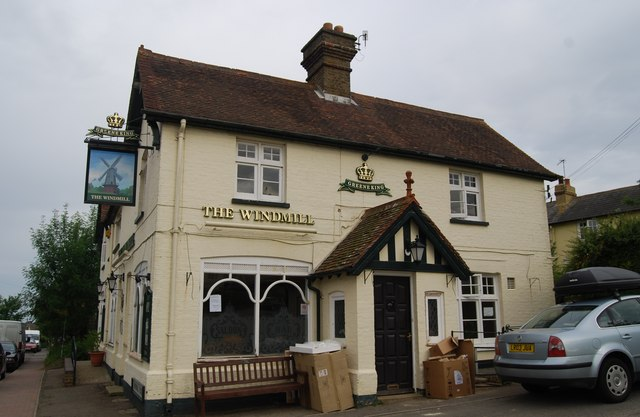
- The Windmill public house in central Weald

- Location within Kent
- Population: 1,474; 1,222 (2011 Census)
- Civil parish: Sevenoaks Weald
- District: Sevenoaks
- Shire county: Kent
- Region: South East
- Country: England
- Sovereign state: United Kingdom
- Post town: SEVENOAKS
- Postcode district: TN14
- Dialling code: 01732
- Police: Kent
- Fire: Kent
- Ambulance: South East Coast
- UK Parliament: Sevenoaks

Sevenoaks Weald is a village and civil parish in the Sevenoaks District of Kent, England. The parish is located on the Low Weald, immediately south of Sevenoaks town, with the village of Sevenoaks Weald at its centre. It was formed in 1894 from part of the ancient parish of Sevenoaks.

The village was originally named simply Weald.

The parish church is dedicated to St George. It was built in 1821 and was provided as a chapel of ease so that parishioners did not have the long climb to St. Nicholas, the parish church of Sevenoaks. Land and funds were given for the chapel and churchyards by the Lambarde family. Architect Thomas Graham Jackson added a chancel in 1871; the funds were provided by the Hodgson family. Weald Methodist Church on the village green opened in 1843. Also in the village are a former Brethren Gospel Hall dating from 1875 and the former St Edward the Confessor's Roman Catholic Church.

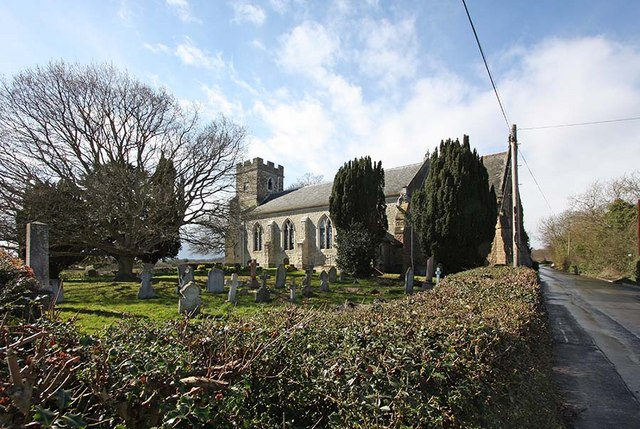
St George's Church

Long Barn is a property with a historic garden, begun in 1915 by Harold Nicolson and Vita Sackville-West and further developed by Edwin Lutyens in 1925. The nearest train station is Sevenoaks.

== See also ==
- List of places of worship in Sevenoaks
