= Chevening Halt railway station =

Former railway station in England

Coordinates: 51°17′24″N 0°08′35″E

Chevening Halt
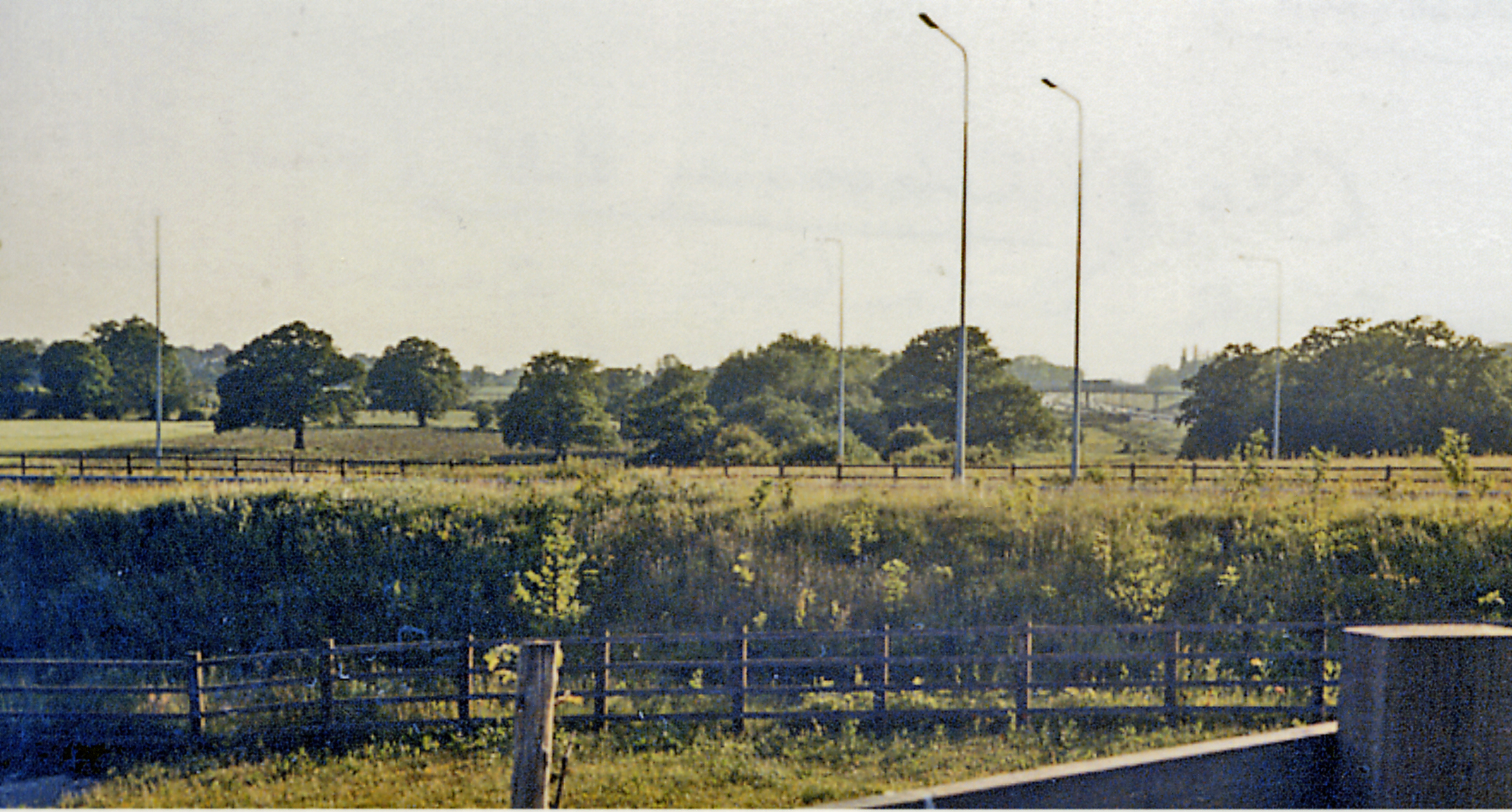
- Site of Chevening Halt (1983)

General information
- Location: Chevening, Sevenoaks; England
- Grid reference: TQ495567
- Platforms: 1

Other information
- Status: Disused

History
- Pre-grouping: SECR
- Post-grouping: Southern Railway; Southern Region of British Railways

Key dates
- 19 April 1906: Opened
- 30 October 1961: Station closed
Location

The Westerham branch in relation to other railway lines in Kent

Chevening Halt is a now-closed intermediate railway station on the Westerham branch line in Kent.

== History ==
The line was built as single track with provision for double track. The station was built by South Eastern and Chatham Railway (SECR) and opened on either 16 or 19 April 1906. It was unstaffed and consisted of a platform sufficient to accommodate 2 coaches and small waiting shelter with access via a staircase to the adjacent road bridge. Operations were taken over by the Southern Railway with the 1923 railway grouping and thereafter by the Southern Region of British Railways which closed the line on 30 October 1961 ostensibly due to low patronage. The line was the subject of a revival/preservation attempt which was scuppered by plans for the M25 which called for the use of much of the route of the line.

The former station site is today a rough piece of overgrown scrubland bordering Junction 5 of the M25; this motorway is infamous as having been responsible for the dashing of any hopes of preserving the Westerham Branch. In 1964, Kent County Council had demanded from the Westerham Valley Railway Association, an association seeking to retain the railway for heritage operations, the sum of £26,215 (approximately £337,000 today) for a bridge to carry the railway line over the M25; failure to pay this sum would lead to the immediate in-filling of the Chevening cutting (in which the Halt lay), which is exactly what happened when funds could not be raised. According to one account, the halt platform was buried and remains there to this day.

Preceding station	Disused railways	Following station
Brasted	British Rail; Southern Region; Westerham branch	Dunton Green

== Gallery ==
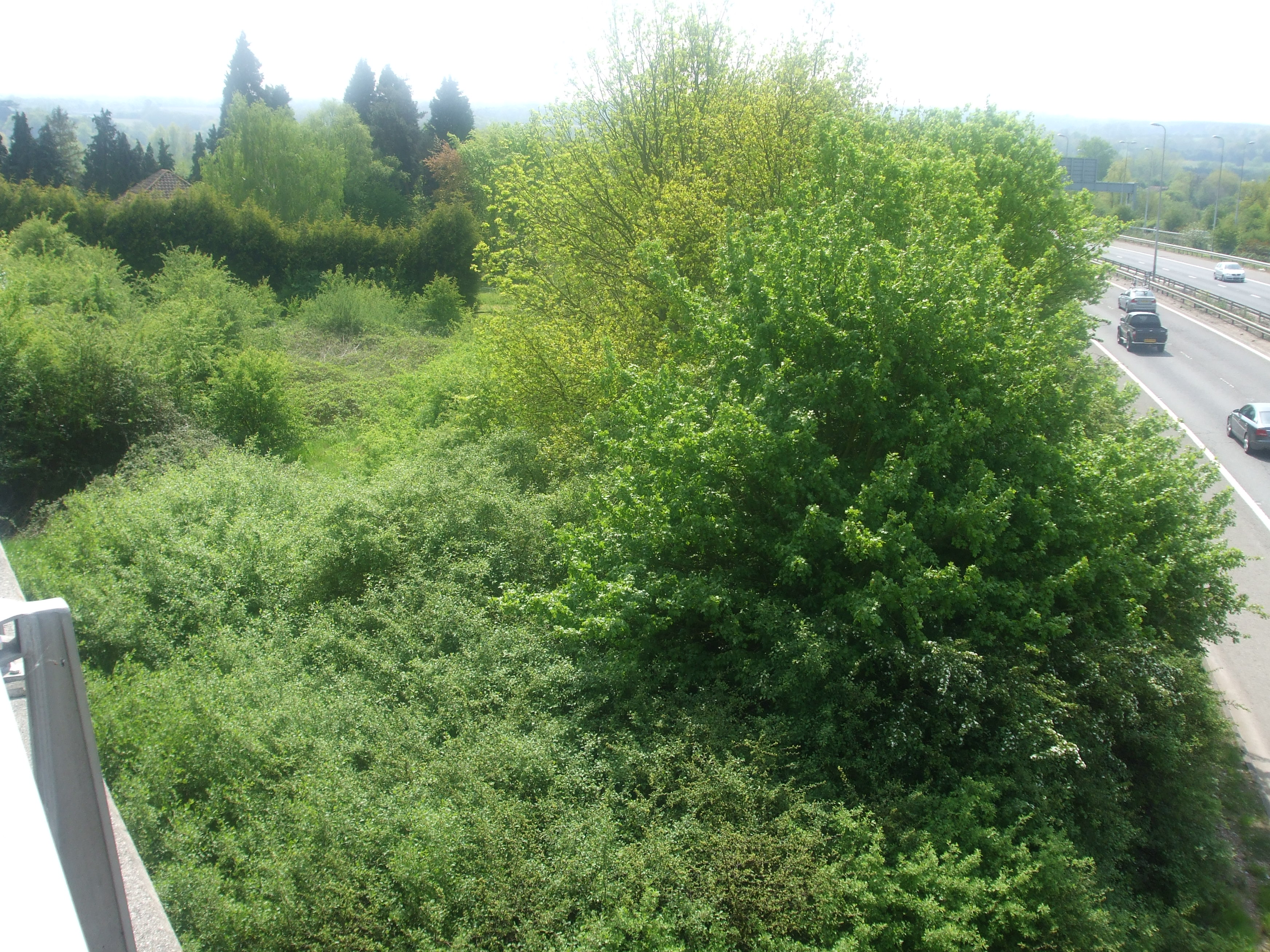
Site of the Halt

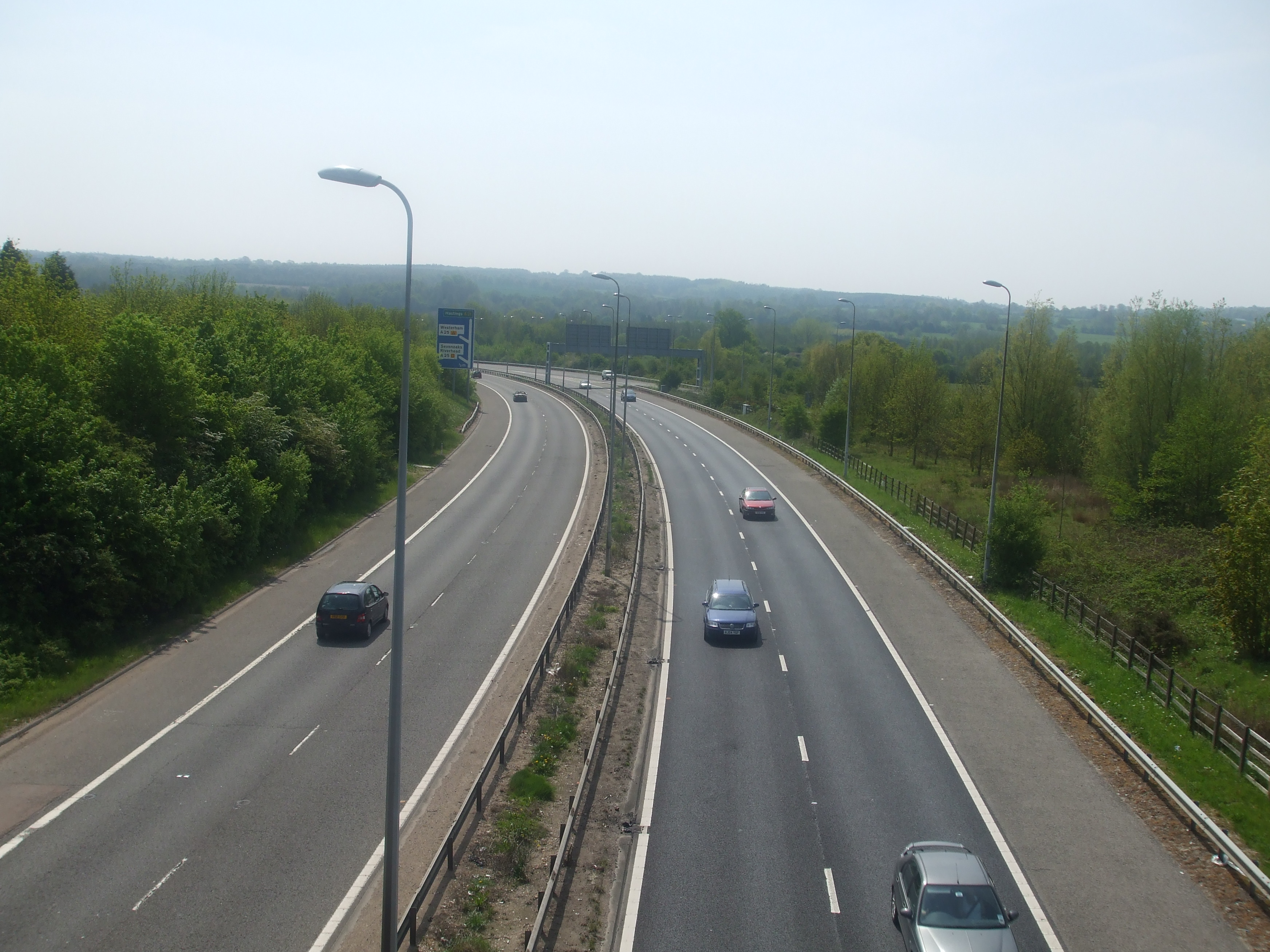
M25 looking southwards from the Halt site to where the bridge would have been constructed

== Other stations ==
- Westerham
- Brasted
- Dunton Green

== See also ==
- List of closed railway stations in Britain

== Sources ==
- Kidner, R. W. (1985). Southern Railway Halts. Survey and Gazetteer. Headington, Oxford: The Oakwood Press. ISBN 0-85361-321-4.
