= Listed buildings in Dunton Green =

Historic structures in Kent, England

Dunton Green is a village and civil parish in the Sevenoaks District of Kent, England. It contains two grade II* and six grade II listed buildings that are recorded in the National Heritage List for England.

This list is based on the information retrieved online from Historic England.

== Key ==
Grade	Criteria
I	Buildings that are of exceptional interest
II*	Particularly important buildings of more than special interest
II	Buildings that are of special interest

== Listing ==
Name	Grade	Location	Type	Completed (Note: The date given is the date used by Historic England as significant for the initial building or that of an important part in the structure's description.)	Date designated	Grid ref. (Note: The grid reference is based on the British national grid reference system, sometimes known as OSGB36, used by the Ordnance Survey.) Geo-coordinates	Notes	Entry number (Note: The "List Entry Number" is a unique number assigned to each listed building and scheduled monument by Historic England.)	Image	Wikidata
Building Q14, Fort Halstead	II	Fort Halstead			25 February 2011	TQ4985959261; 51°18′46″N 0°08′56″E		1396578	Upload Photo	Q26675355
Broughton House	II*	London Road, Broughton House			10 September 1954	TQ5116458125; 51°18′08″N 0°10′01″E		1253962	Upload Photo	Q17545712
Broughton Lodge	II	London Road			16 January 1975	TQ5091257748; 51°17′56″N 0°09′48″E		1085927	Upload Photo	Q26374949
Donnington Manor Hotel (formerly Emma Hotel)	II	London Road, TN13 2TD			16 January 1975	TQ5069558121; 51°18′08″N 0°09′37″E		1253947	Upload Photo	Q26545654
The Duke's Head Public House	II	London Road			16 January 1975	TQ5111157399; 51°17′44″N 0°09′58″E		1253964	The Duke's Head Public House More images	Q26545668
Fort Halstead: Building F11	II	Nr Sevenoaks			21 March 2013	TQ4986259145; 51°18′42″N 0°08′56″E		1412292	Upload Photo	Q26676266
Fort Halstead: Buildings F16 and F17	II*	Nr Sevenoaks			21 March 2013	TQ4991459168; 51°18′43″N 0°08′58″E		1412293	Upload Photo	Q99671020
Rye Cottage	II	Rye Lane			16 January 1975	TQ5193657903; 51°18′00″N 0°10′41″E		1253972	Upload Photo	Q26545675

== See also ==
- Grade I listed buildings in Kent
- Grade II* listed buildings in Kent

== Sources ==
- Newman, John (2012) [1969], Kent: West and the Weald, The Buildings of England, New Haven and London: Yale University Press, ISBN 978-0-300-18509-6
