= Marsh Green, Kent =

Hamlet in Kent, United Kingdom

Coordinates: 51°10′43″N 0°03′24″E

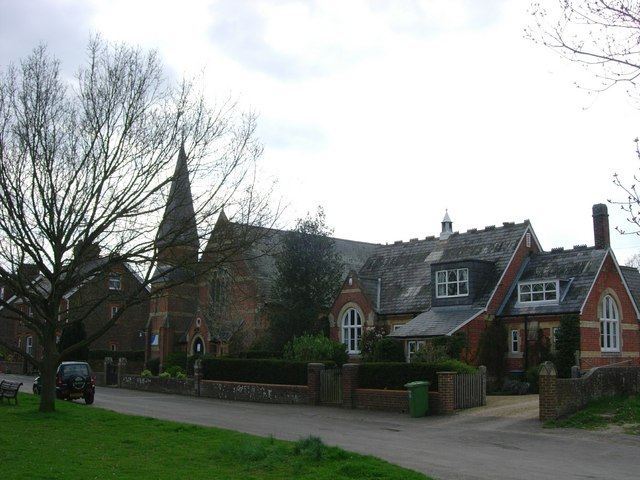
Marsh Green Church and old school house

Marsh Green is a small hamlet in Eden Vale, part of the parish of Edenbridge, England. The hamlet was founded in 1554 under its current name.

Marsh Green claims the last bare-knuckle boxing fight in England, was in 1886.
