= Dunton Green railway station =

Railway station in Kent, England

Coordinates: 51°17′48″N 0°10′17″E

Dunton Green
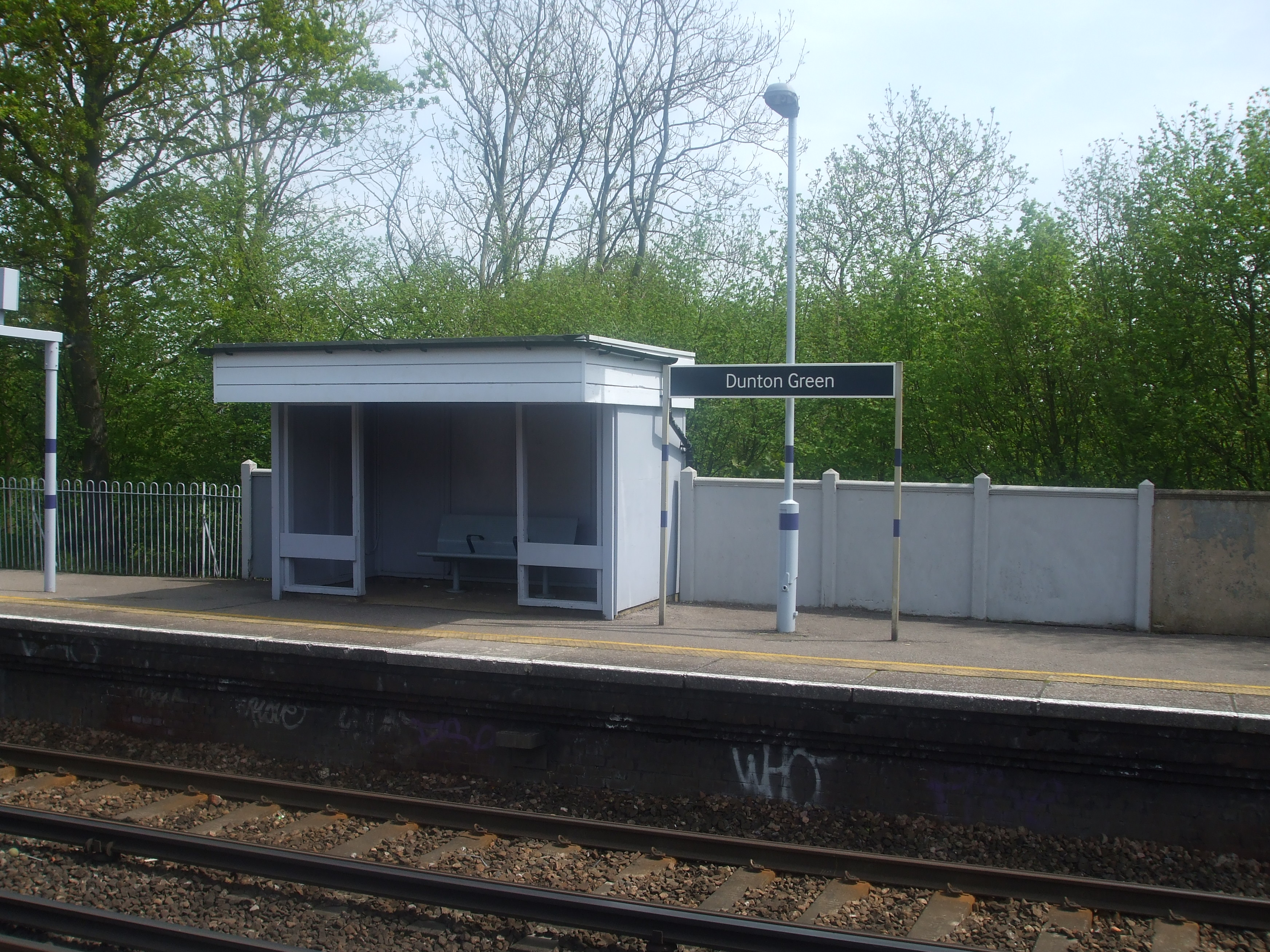

General information
- Location: Dunton Green, District of Sevenoaks; England
- Grid reference: TQ514575
- Manager: Southeastern
- Platforms: 2

Other information
- Station code: DNG
- Classification: DfT category F2

History
- Opened: 2 March 1868

Passengers
- 2020/21: ▼43,054
- 2021/22: ▲0.153 million
- 2022/23: ▲0.190 million
- 2023/24: ▲0.199 million
- 2024/25: ▼0.195 million
Location
Notes
- Passenger statistics from the Office of Rail and Road

Dunton Green railway station is on the South Eastern Main Line in England, serving the Kent village of Dunton Green. It is 20 miles 46 chains (33.1 km) down the line from London Charing Cross and is situated between Knockholt and Sevenoaks stations. Trains calling at the station are operated by Southeastern.

== History ==
Until 1961 this station served as the junction for the Westerham Valley Branch Line to Brasted and Westerham. When this line was constructed, a subway was built which passed under the branch platform and allowed access from the main station forecourt to a footpath leading west to Dunton Green. This subway remains in place today.

=== Accidents and incidents ===
On 23 April 2021, a tamper caught fire near the station and was severely damaged. Both lines were blocked. Services between Sevenoaks and Orpington were diverted.

== Facilities ==
The station is unstaffed, having had its ticket office closed in the early 1990s. Tickets must now be purchased from the self-service ticket machine at the station which is also fitted with passenger help points and information screens on both platforms.

The station has a small car park which holds a total of 26 cars. The car park was free until November 2008 when charges were introduced and the car park is now operated by Saba Parking. There is also a small cycle rack at the station entrance.

The station has step-free access available to the London bound platform only as the Sevenoaks bound platform is only reachable through the use of steps.

== Services ==
All services at Dunton Green are operated by Southeastern using Class 376, 465, 466 and 707 EMUs.

The typical off-peak service in trains per hour is:

- 2 tph to London Charing Cross via Grove Park and Lewisham
- 2 tph to Sevenoaks

Connections onto fast services to London, Tunbridge Wells and Hastings can be made by changing at Orpington or Sevenoaks along with Thameslink services to Bromley South and London Victoria.

Preceding station	National Rail	Following station
Knockholt	Southeastern Grove Park Line	Sevenoaks
	Disused railways	
Chevening Halt	British Rail Southern Region Westerham Valley Branch Line	Terminus
