= Brasted =

Village in Kent, England

Coordinates: 51.276610°N 0.110790°E

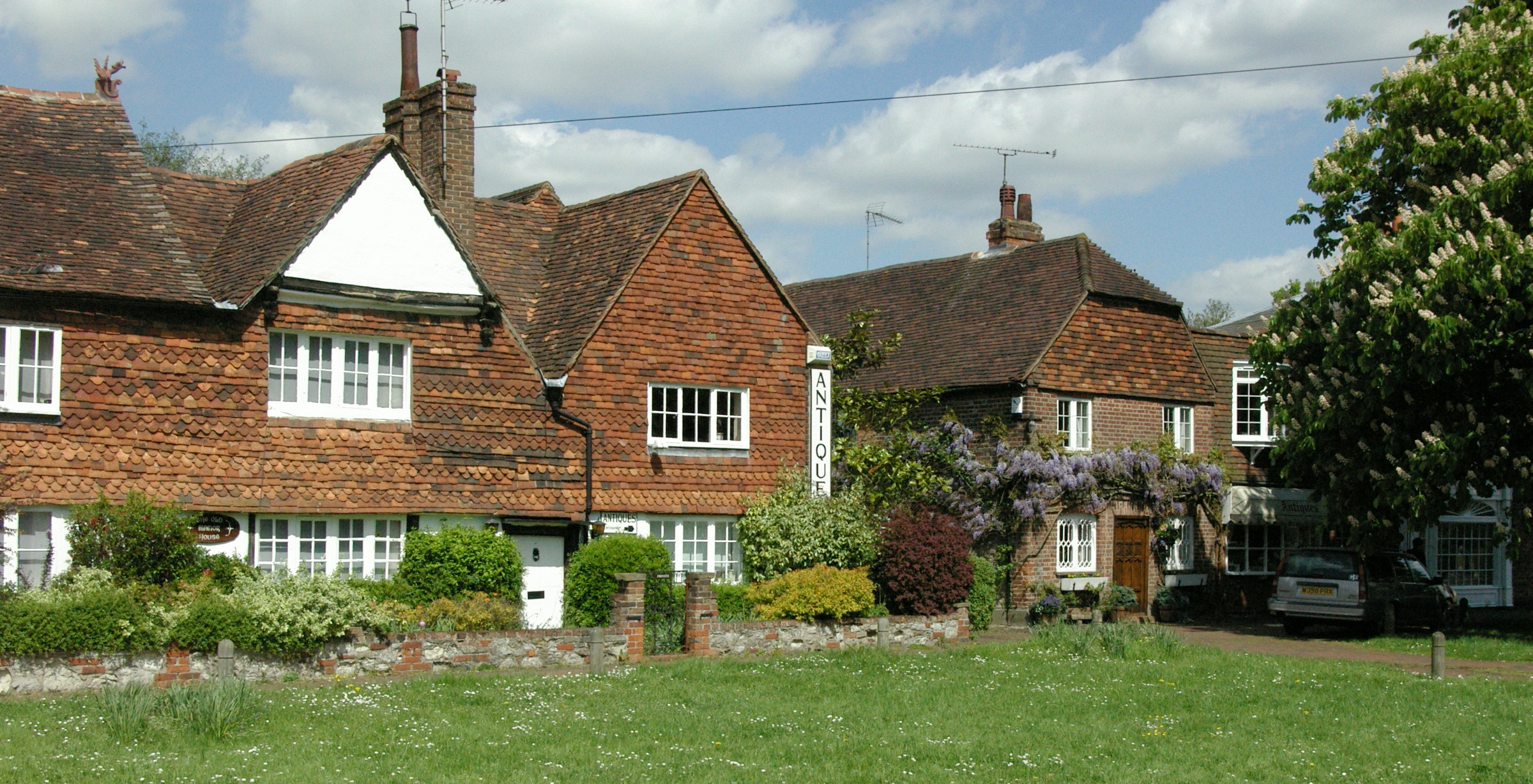
- The village green at Brasted

- Location within Kent
- Population: 1,429 (2011 census)
- Civil parish: Brasted
- District: Sevenoaks
- Shire county: Kent
- Region: South East
- Country: England
- Sovereign state: United Kingdom
- Post town: WESTERHAM
- Postcode district: TN16
- Dialling code: 01959
- Police: Kent
- Fire: Kent
- Ambulance: South East Coast
- UK Parliament: Sevenoaks

Brasted /ˈbreɪstɛd/ is a village and civil parish in the Sevenoaks District of Kent, England. Brasted lies on the A25 road, between Sundridge and Westerham; the road is named Westerham Road, High Street and Main Road as it passes through the village east to west. Brasted is 3 3/4 miles (6.0 km) west of Sevenoaks town. The parish had a population of 1321 (2001 census) and includes the hamlets of Brasted Chart, Toys Hill and Puddledock. The village of Brasted has a number of 18th-century houses with several antique shops, pubs and residences. The parish church is dedicated to St Martin.

== History ==
The name is recorded as Briestede in 1086, one of only two large manors in the hundred of Westerham described in the Domesday Book, and as Bradestede around 1100; it is from Old English brād + stede and means "broad place". After the Domesday hundreds of Kent were consolidated, Brasted was in the "Hundred of Westerham and Edenbridge". From 1894 to 1974, Brasted was within the Sevenoaks Rural District.

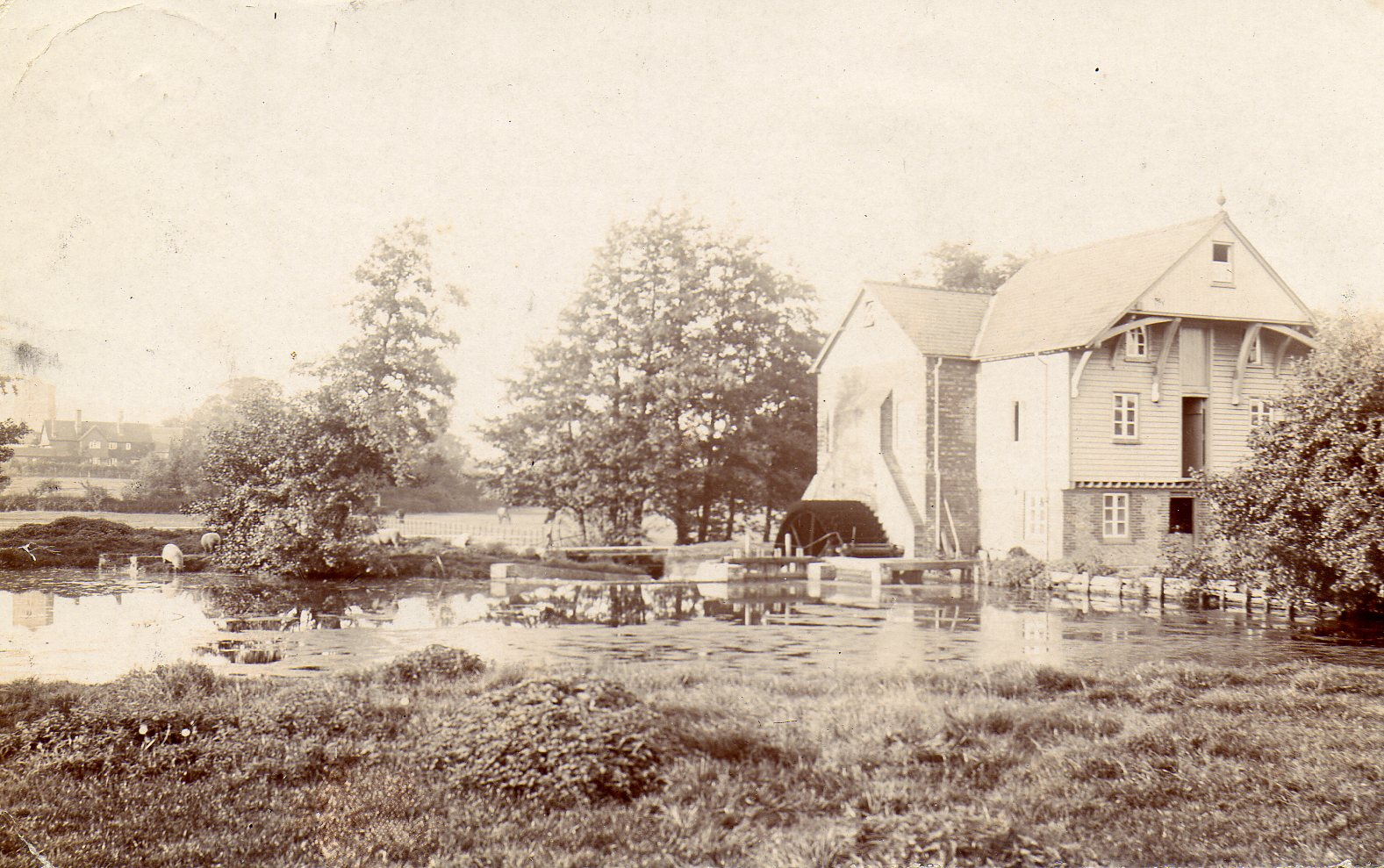
The Brasted Watermill, circa 1906

In the 18th century and earlier, Brasted had the economic advantage of a watermill.

Brasted had a railway station on the branch line running between Westerham and Dunton Green that opened in 1881 and closed in 1961.

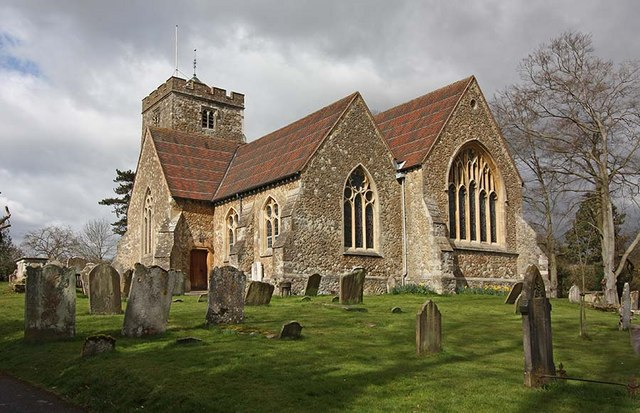
St Martin's Church

John Turton (1735–1806), famed physician to King George III, was the first owner of Brasted Place, one of only two houses in Kent that were designed by neoclassical architect Robert Adam. In the 19th century, Napoleon III lived for a time at Brasted Place and it was also the childhood home of garden designer Henry Avray Tipping. In 1911, it was purchased by the mining millionaire Leslie Urquhart. Later in the 20th century, it housed Brasted Place Theological College and the surrounding acreage was sold for mainly residential uses. Following its disuse as a country house, it was eventually repurposed as commercial office suites. In the early 21st century, architect and restorationist Michael Wilson crafted a seven-apartment interior for Brasted Place, now within an eight-acre park. Its lodge and gateway also became listed historic buildings.

Australian soft-drink manufacturer George Marchant was born in Brasted in 1857. During the Second World War, the local pub, the White Hart, was popular with RAF fighter pilots stationed at nearby RAF Biggin Hill.

Just to the north of Brasted, the M25 motorway passes in a west–east direction; the River Darent has its source near the village.

== Brasted Chart ==
Brasted Chart is a hamlet within the civil parish of Brasted. It lies to the south of Brasted and the north of Four Elms. Its road, Chart Lane, leads to another hamlet called Toys Hill to the south. There is no chapel or church; however, there are numerous Grade II listed buildings, the former stables and coach house and linking wall and mounting block to the south west of the house of Foxwold. Similarly, all the buildings (Cottage, Oast House, Piggery and former dairy, now a base camp for private group bookings and working holidays) at Outridge Farm (owned by the National Trust) have Grade II listed building status. The Oast Houses are unique in that the cowls are octagonal, in comparison to the usual conical shape found in both Kent and Sussex.

== See also ==
- Listed buildings in Brasted
