= Riverhead, Kent =

Village in Kent, England

Coordinates: 51.284655°N 0.169988°E

Riverhead
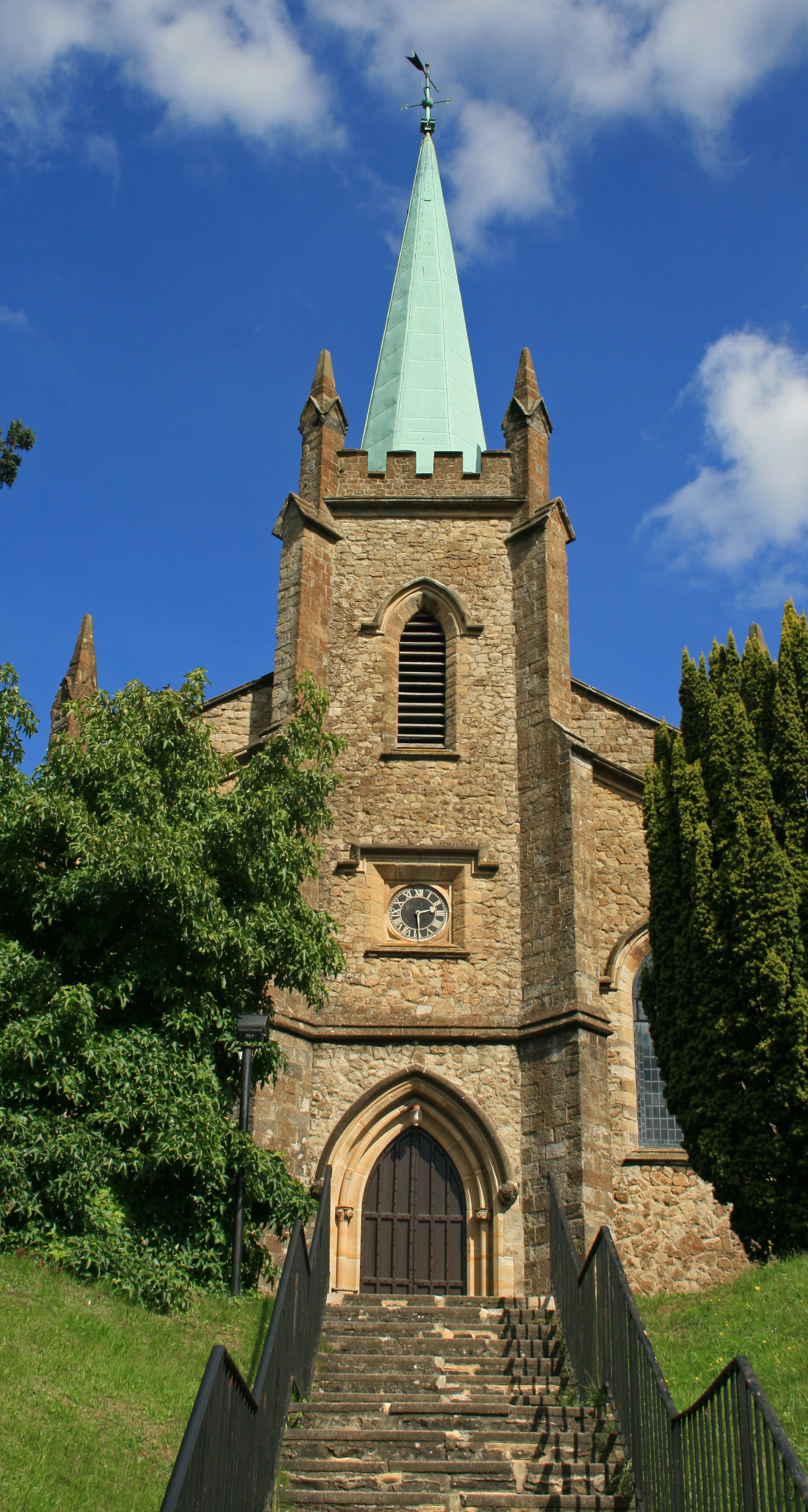
- Church of St Mary, Riverhead

- Location within Kent
- Population: 1,821; 2,634 (2011 Census)
- OS grid reference: TQ 514275
- Civil parish: Riverhead
- District: Sevenoaks
- Shire county: Kent
- Region: South East
- Country: England
- Sovereign state: United Kingdom
- Post town: Sevenoaks
- Postcode district: TN13
- Dialling code: 01732
- Police: Kent
- Fire: Kent
- Ambulance: South East Coast
- UK Parliament: Sevenoaks

Riverhead is a northern countryside village part of the urban area of Sevenoaks in the district of the same name in Kent, England and is also a civil parish. The parish had a population in 2001 of 1821, increasing to 2,634 at the 2011 Census.

The parish stretches from Chipstead Lake and the River Darent in the north through the hamlet of Dibden and A21 to Mill Bank Wood in the south.

== History ==
The origin of the name of the village may lie in the Saxon word 'rither' meaning hill or deriving from the word meaning 'cattle landing place'. Riverhead was an early settlement, part of the Codsheath Hundred. The settlement grew in size during Saxon times as traffic on the pilgrim routes between Canterbury and Winchester increased. The prosperity of the village during Georgian times is indicated by the high proportion of households that had to pay Hearth Tax on their properties, and although the village was of modest size, it was surrounded by several major country estates such as Chipstead Place, Bradbourne and Montreal.

Riverhead had a variety of country industries typical of the area, including a tannery, a timber yard, smithies and the posting house. The economy was based mainly on agriculture, along with some gravel and sand quarrying to the north east of the village that created the lakes around Bradbourne which are now a wildfowl reserve.

The village has a central conservation area that covers some 25 acres (10 ha) and contains about 30 listed buildings. The listed properties in the Conservation Area date from the 17th-18th centuries and the older unlisted properties date mainly from the 19th Century.

The 1831-built C of E church is dedicated to St Mary the Virgin; its architect was Decimus Burton. It is in the late Georgian lancet style, executed in characteristic local materials. The 1882 extension by Arthur William Blomfield shows how Victorian church design developed. The east window was installed in 1905 by Charles Eamer Kempe.

== Today ==
Every year there is the Village Fete and Carnival on the little common, surrounded by residential roads in the west of the village, held by the 3rd Sevenoaks scout group.

There is one pub in Riverhead, The Bullfinch (McMullen & Sons). The village has a butchers on The Square, Batchelors, a small, family-run business, providing its own spicy sausage from a South African recipe called 'Boerewors'.

Shops on the White Hart Parade and London Road include a couple of boutiques, a small art gallery, restaurants, a dry cleaners, barber, and hairdressers. The parade gets its name from a pub that was once there. The village Library offers telecottage services and is open on specific week days. On London Road, along with a coffee shop and boutique, there is also a power-tools, car and machinery hiring shop.

In the north of the village is Tesco and a range of other shops such as Bathstore, a tile store and Majestic Wine. There is also an Aston Martin dealership. The Barratt Lakeside Place estate, built on the former Marley Tiles site in the mid-1990s, sits pleasantly on the banks of Chipstead Lake.

Digital television has been available for aerials pointing east in Riverhead since 2006 from the Blue Bell Hill Transmitter for Kent & Sussex TV transmissions, which is also now broadcasting in HD.

== Education and sport ==
Riverhead contains Amherst Primary School and Riverhead Infants School. On Saturdays, there is Saturday morning football club at the former school, open to the students there. There is a nursery on the former site of Riverhead Infants School until 2002 with the rest of the site now being residential. Holmesdale Cricket Club play in Riverhead at the top of Worship's Hill.

Behind the church is an area known as the sand pits which is popular amongst the young people in Riverhead. The area adjoins a steep sandstone cliff.

The Riverhead parkland is part of the former Montreal Park (the remaining part is an estate of houses) and offers walks and children's recreation areas traversing the Wealden Greensand vale of the Darent Valley between Riverhead Infants School and Brittains Lane, Sevenoaks.

== Governance ==
There is one representative on Kent County Council grouped under Sevenoaks Central, conservative John London first elected in 1997. There are two representatives on Sevenoaks District Council :

Election	Member	Ward
2011	Kim Bayley	Dunton Green & Riverhead
2011	Cameron Brown	Dunton Green & Riverhead

There is also a parish council with nine members.

== Public transport ==
Riverhead is close to Sevenoaks railway station, only 1/2 mile from the village centre and is served by three main bus routes during weekdays (1, 3, 8), all linking the village with Sevenoaks town and station, with about one bus an hour during the day. Buses from Riverhead also connect the village to Westerham (1), Brasted (1), Dunton Green (3), Polhill (3), Orpington (3), St Johns Hill, Sevenoaks (8) and Oak Lane, Kippington. (8). There are currently limited services from Riverhead to Otford, with only the school bus 402A linking the two. Many more villages can be accessed by weekday school buses, such as the 531 (Kemsing), 402W (Westerham), 402B (direct to Tunbridge Wells), 402A (Greatness and Otford) and 403 (Dunton Green). The Go Coach 401 bus is the only service in the village operating on Sundays and Bank Holidays; this runs between Westerham, Sevenoaks, and Tonbridge. Main bus services are provided by Go Coach.

== See also ==
- Listed buildings in Riverhead, Kent
