= Westerham Valley branch line =

Railway line in Kent, England

The Westerham branch in relation to other railway lines in Kent

The Westerham Valley branch line was a short railway line in Kent that connected Westerham, Brasted and Chevening with the village of Dunton Green and the South Eastern Main Line, a distance of 4.5 miles (7.2 km).

== History ==
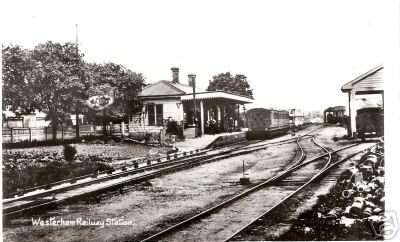
Westerham station in c. 1902

Authorisation for the construction of the line was obtained in 1864, 1867 and 1870 by the South Eastern Railway (SER). No works having been undertaken by 1876, several local inhabitants, aware of the advantages of the railway and impatient for action, rallied together to sponsor a bill similar to the original 1864 bill. The line was to be built in two phases: phase one from Dunton Green via Brasted to Westerham, and phase two covering the 4 miles from Westerham to Oxted, where it would join the Oxted Line, the construction of which had not by then been completed. However, the second phase was never realised due to opposition from the SER.

Westerham Valley Railway Act 1876
- Act of Parliament
- Parliament of the United Kingdom
- Long title: An Act to authorise the construction of a Railway from Dunton Green to Westerham both in the County of Kent and for other purposes connected with the said Railway.
- Citation: 39 & 40 Vict. c. clxvi

Dates
- Royal assent: 24 July 1876

Text of statute as originally enacted

The line was authorised by the Westerham Valley Railway Act 1876 (39 & 40 Vict. c. clxvi) on 24 July 1876 and the Westerham Valley Railway Company was formed to oversee its construction and to take over formal ownership. An agreement was then concluded in 1879 with the South Eastern Railway by which the latter would undertake the construction works and eventually operate the line. The actual cost of construction was in the region of £70,000 and the line opened on 7 July 1881. Initially, the service ran only from Westerham to Dunton Green where passengers wishing to travel to London Charing Cross (via Cannon Street) would have to change. Formal ownership of the line was transferred to the South Eastern Railway in August 1881 at which point the Westerham Valley Railway Company was dissolved.

In 1899, SER merged with its bitter rival, the London, Chatham and Dover Railway (LCDR) to form the South Eastern and Chatham Railway (SECR).

In 1923, the Westerham Valley branch, together with its operators the SECR, became part of the Southern Railway at the grouping.

== Decline ==
The Southern Railway was nationalised in 1948 and became the Southern Region of British Railways.

The line began to suffer competition with buses, notably the 403 route which ran from Croydon via Sanderstead, Chelsham and Westerham to Sevenoaks, and as train fares rose dramatically from 1938, passenger numbers fell. By 1960 the line was reported to be losing £26,000 per year and a proposal was made to close it in April 1960. However, the Central Transport Users' Consultative Committee argued against this move, claiming that 200 passengers per day used the line.

This advice was rejected by the then Minister of Transport, Ernest Marples, and the last day of operation of the line would be 28 October 1961. He rejected a petition against closure signed by almost 2,500 local inhabitants and presented by the MP for Sevenoaks, John Rodgers. The Minister claimed that service was losing £26,000 per year which was equivalent to £150 per passenger. One of the last trains to run was the "Westerham Flyer", a Class H 0-4-4T No. 31518 flying a Union Jack and bearing the notice "Flyer 1881-1961".

== Attempted revival ==
=== Westerham Valley Railway Association ===
Flyer distributed by the Westerham Valley Railway Association in c1963

In 1962, the Westerham Valley Railway Association, born of a merger between two local interest groups, the Westerham Branch Railway Passengers' Association and the Westerham Valley Railway Society, began to investigate the possibility of re-opening the line, staffed by volunteers, for commuters on weekdays and as a heritage railway at weekends between April and October. British Railways offered the ownership of the line for £30,000 on the basis that a commuter service would be provided, thereby allowing it to cease its subsidies of bus services which were now over-subscribed following the closure of the Westerham branch. In July 1962, British Railways granted a lease of Westerham Station building, which became the Headquarters of the Association. A lease of Brasted Station was also later agreed.

=== Offer to purchase the line ===
However, British Railways were later to change their policy regarding the disposal of disused branch lines and, as they had done with the Bluebell Railway, were no longer prepared to simply lease the line to a private operator. Instead, they now required an outright sale of the line to the Association for £53,000. Thanks to the help of an anonymous backer, the Association was able to put forward an offer of £30,000 for the track, buildings, land and branch platform at Dunton Green. British Railways accepted this offer subject to the condition that a commuter service be provided, thereby enabling it to cease its annual subsidy of £8,700 towards the additional bus services laid on following the line's closure.

=== Promoted Inevitability ===
Even during this time of hopeful negotiation, a seeming inevitability of closure was accepted, when, in the 'Look at Life (film series)' ' episode, 'Draw the Fires', from 1963, Westerham Station was shown empty, with a litter-strewn track, and ending symbolically with a signal 'halting' a train service.

=== Intervention of Kent County Council ===
The withdrawal of the backer following the refusal of his planning application to develop land at Westerham Station cast serious doubt on the proposed re-opening. In the Association's Annual General Meeting on 2 November 1963, members were informed that efforts to raise the £30,000 plus £10,000 for equipment had failed. Furthermore, British Railways were now in talks with the Kent County Council regarding the sale of the line to enable the construction of the A21 Sevenoaks bypass which required the demolition of a bridge along the route of the line.

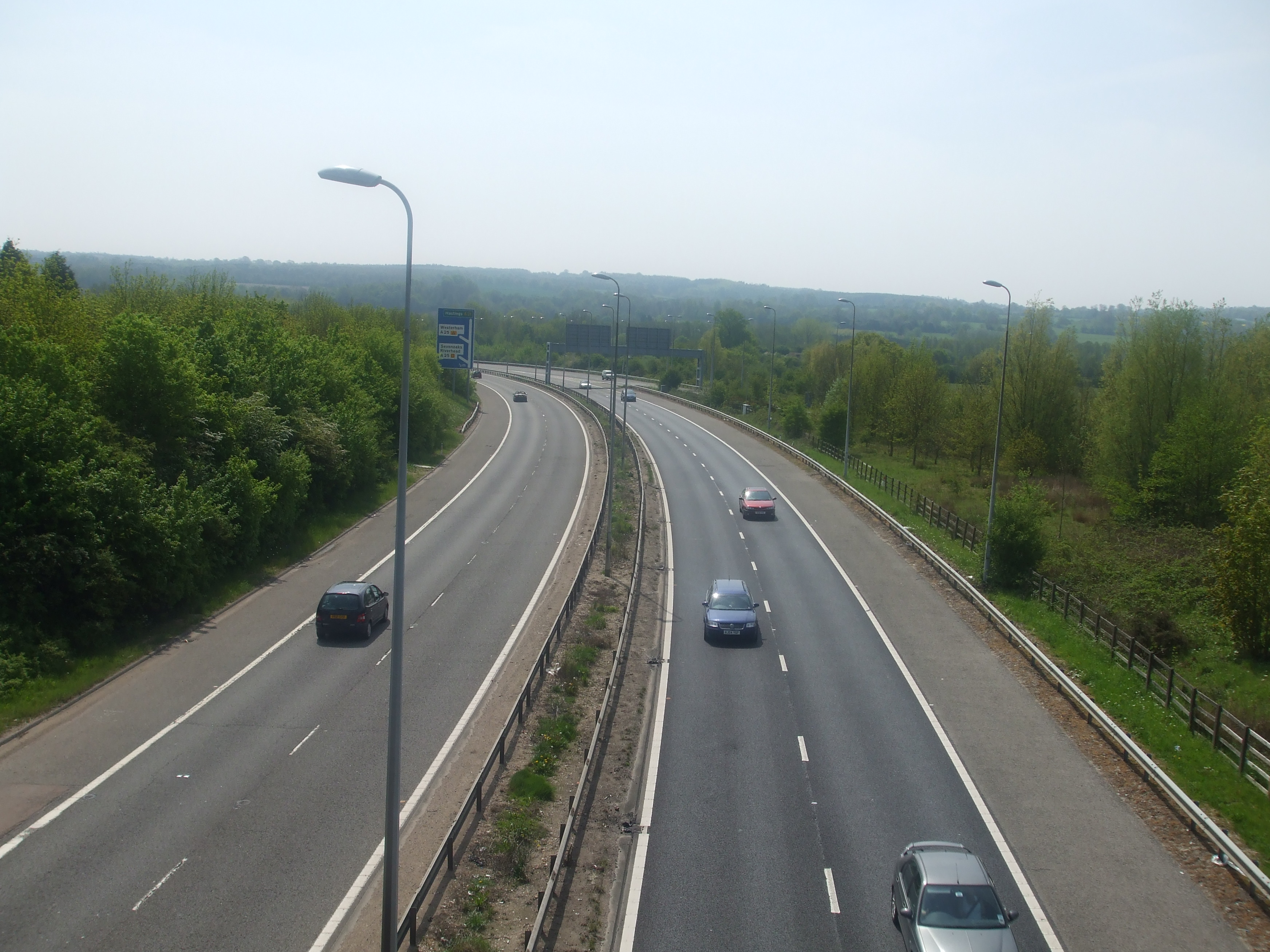
The A21 near Chevening crossing the route of the line running left to right

More positive news was received later in November 1963 when it was revealed that not only had a new backer been found, but also that terms were agreed with British Railways for the sale of the land to the Association. However, one month later, Kent County Council contacted the Association and informed them that the Council's intended purchase of the land would save taxpayers the sum of £120,000 and, furthermore, that in the event British Railways were unwilling to sell the land to it, as had been intimated, compulsory purchase powers would be used. Faced with the prospect of a compulsory sale, British Railways now broke off negotiations with the Association and agreed to sell the line to the Council.

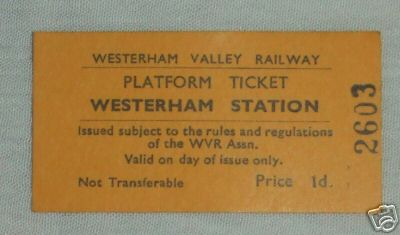
Westerham Valley Railway Association platform ticket

However, in April 1964, the Council indicated their willingness to lease the line to the Association, thereby ensuring the line's continued existence if the Association were to finance the cost of constructing a bridge over the railway cutting at Chevening to enable the Sevenoaks bypass to cross it. The cost of this bridge was estimated by the Council at £14,000, added to which was the annual rent of the line of £3,000. The estimate of £14,000 was revised upwards in August 1964, to a figure of £26,215 (equivalent to £355,800 in modern currency) which was to be paid by 24 August, otherwise works would commence to infill the cutting.

=== Purchase of rolling stock ===
In the meantime, the purchase of several former Metropolitan Railway coaches and a Class H 0-4-4T locomotive No. 31263 had been agreed and were awaiting collection. Initially, British Railways had allowed the stock to be stored at Dunton Green, but since the intervention of the Kent County Council, it became 'reluctant' to allow this and threatened to scrap the stock were it not collected. The coaches were loaned and later sold to the Keighley and Worth Valley Railway and the locomotive to the Bluebell Railway where it remains today.

=== Final days ===
By November 1964 the funds to construct the bridge had still not been found and, following the infilling of the Chevening cutting, the Association realised that their plans to re-open the line could no longer be realised. This was notwithstanding intervention by the MP for Faversham, Terence Boston, who unsuccessfully attempted to persuade the new Labour Minister of Transport, Tom Fraser, to hold an enquiry into the County Council's plans to convert the line into motorway.

In autumn 1965, the Association merged with the Kent & East Sussex Railway Preservation Society. By March 1967 the railway track had been lifted and Westerham Station demolished. Works on the section of the M25 from Sundridge Road to Westerham commenced in December 1976 and were completed in December 1979.

== The line today ==
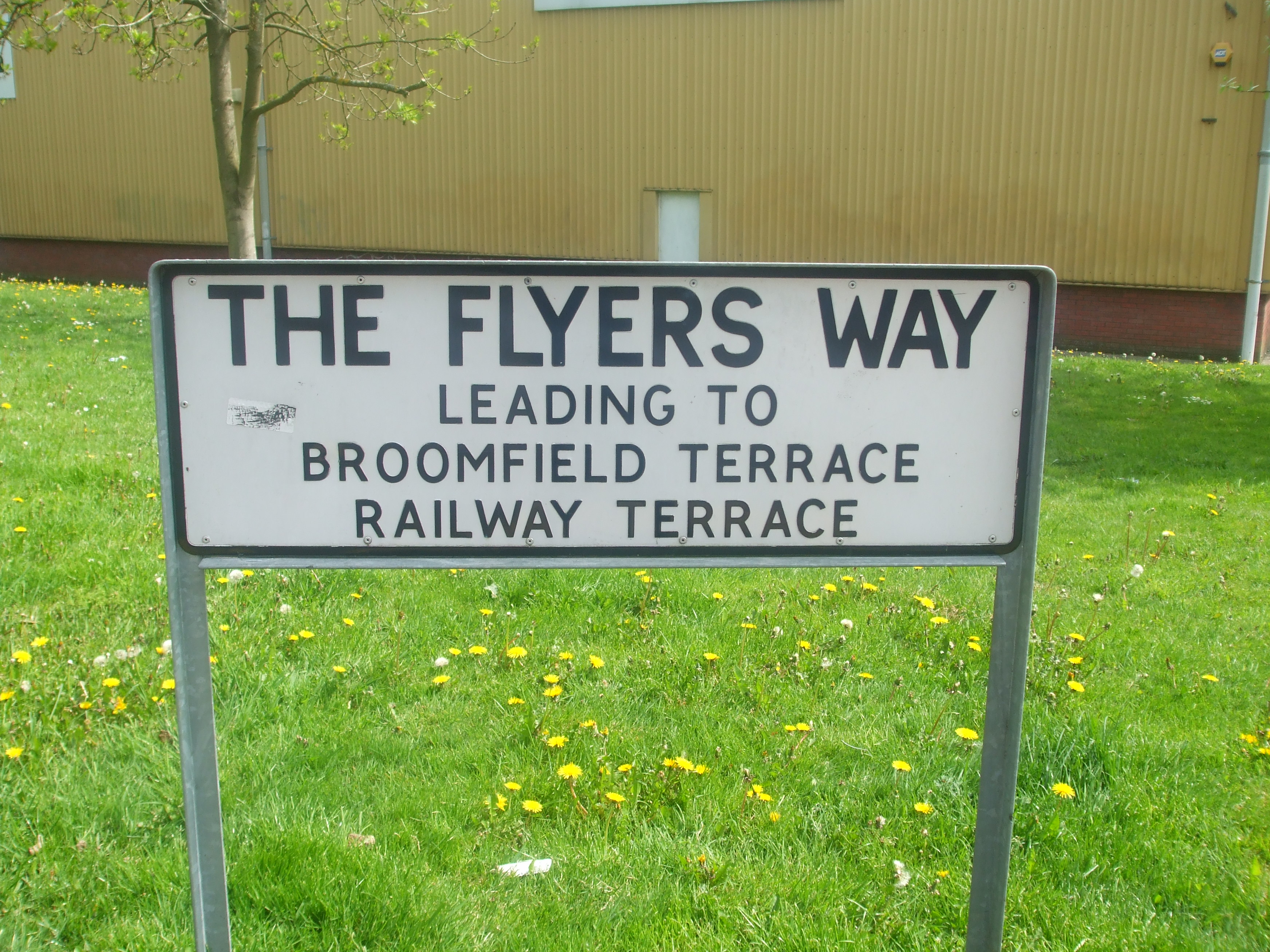
The Flyers Way road

Save for the section taken by the M25, a surprising amount of the line still remains and it is possible to walk from Dunton Green as far as junction 5 on the motorway which is situated near Chevening. Nothing remains of the three stations, save for several houses in Railway Terrace, Westerham, near the site of the old station. The site of Westerham station is now covered by a road known as "The Flyers Way" after the name by which the train was known locally. The site of Brasted station is now under the westbound hard shoulder lane of the M25 although the station approach road and site of the goods yard can be seen alongside the motorway. The site of Chevening Halt is now a field alongside the M25/A21 interchange although it is possible the platform may still exist buried when the cutting was infilled for the M25/A21 roadworks.
