= Grade I listed buildings in Sevenoaks District =

There are over 9,000 Grade I listed buildings in England. This page is a list of these buildings in the district of Sevenoaks in Kent.

== Sevenoaks ==
| Name | Location | Type | Completed (Note: The date given is the date used by Historic England as significant for the initial building or that of an important part in the structure's description.) | Date designated | Grid ref. (Note: Sometimes known as OSGB36, the grid reference is based on the British national grid reference system used by the Ordnance Survey.) Geo-coordinates | Entry number (Note: The "List Entry Number" is a unique number assigned to each listed building and scheduled monument by Historic England.) | Image |
|---|---|---|---|---|---|---|---|
| Parish Church of Saint Peter and Saint Paul | New Ash Green, Ash-cum-Ridley | Parish Church | 13th century | 1 June 1967 | TQ6018264562; 51°21′27″N 0°17′57″E | 1235106 | Parish Church of Saint Peter and Saint Paul More images |
| Brasted Place and Saxon Cross | Brasted | Villa | c. 1784 | 10 September 1954 | TQ4766854996; 51°16′30″N 0°06′56″E | 1336432 | Upload Photo |
| Chevening House | Chevening | House | Second quarter of 17th century | 10 September 1954 | TQ4870857667; 51°17′55″N 0°07′54″E | 1085853 | Chevening House More images |
| Church of St Botolph | Chevening | Church | 12th century | 10 September 1954 | TQ4892057695; 51°17′56″N 0°08′05″E | 1336446 | Church of St Botolph More images |
| Church of St Mary Magdalene | Cowden | Church | 15th century | 10 September 1954 | TQ4662140472; 51°08′41″N 0°05′41″E | 1085906 | Church of St Mary Magdalene More images |
| Church of St Peter and St Paul | Edenbridge | Church | Late C11-early 12th century | 10 September 1954 | TQ4449046130; 51°11′46″N 0°04′00″E | 1085930 | Church of St Peter and St Paul More images |
| Church of Saint Botolph | Lullingstone, Eynsford | Church | Norman | 1 June 1967 | TQ5299264436; 51°21′30″N 0°11′45″E | 1222051 | Church of Saint Botolph More images |
| Church of Saint Martin | Eynsford | Church | 12th century | 1 June 1967 | TQ5404865467; 51°22′03″N 0°12′42″E | 1217157 | Church of Saint Martin More images |
| The Gatehouse to Lullingstone Castle | Lullingstone, Eynsford | Gatehouse | Second half 16th century | 1 June 1967 | TQ5292864411; 51°21′29″N 0°11′42″E | 1217173 | The Gatehouse to Lullingstone Castle More images |
| Church of Saint Peter and Saint Paul | Farningham | Church | 13th century | 1 June 1967 | TQ5471466904; 51°22′48″N 0°13′18″E | 1237990 | Church of Saint Peter and Saint Paul More images |
| Church of Saint Mary | Fawkham | Church | Norman | 1 June 1967 | TQ5970068047; 51°23′20″N 0°17′38″E | 1238236 | Church of Saint Mary More images |
| Church of All Saints | Hartley | Church | 12th century | 1 June 1967 | TQ6131966665; 51°22′34″N 0°18′59″E | 1238242 | Church of All Saints More images |
| Church of St Peter | Hever | Church | 1856 | 16 January 1975 | TQ4765544849; 51°11′02″N 0°06′41″E | 1258341 | Church of St Peter More images |
| Hever Castle | Hever | Castle | Late C13-Early 14th century | 10 September 1954 | TQ4783045188; 51°11′13″N 0°06′50″E | 1273465 | Hever Castle More images |
| Franks Hall | Horton Kirby and South Darenth | Mansion House | 1591 | 1 August 1952 | TQ5550267822; 51°23′17″N 0°14′00″E | 1238914 | Franks Hall More images |
| St Clere | Heaverham, Kemsing | House | Second quarter of 17th century | 10 September 1954 | TQ5769259121; 51°18′34″N 0°15′40″E | 1258564 | St Clere More images |
| Church of St Bartholomew | Otford | Church | Early Norman | 10 September 1954 | TQ5285159308; 51°18′44″N 0°11′30″E | 1273170 | Church of St Bartholomew More images |
| Church of St John the Baptist | Penshurst | Church | 1631 | 10 September 1954 | TQ5273243859; 51°10′25″N 0°11′00″E | 1243204 | Church of St John the Baptist More images |
| Penshurst Place | Penshurst | House | 1392 | 10 September 1954 | TQ5274543976; 51°10′29″N 0°11′01″E | 1243169 | Penshurst Place More images |
| South central entrance tower to Penshurst Place and wall abutting to east | Penshurst Park, Penshurst | Tower | c. 1400 | 16 January 1975 | TQ5277843948; 51°10′28″N 0°11′03″E | 1243044 | South central entrance tower to Penshurst Place and wall abutting to east More images |
| Church of St Peter and St Paul | Seal | Church | 13th century | 10 September 1954 | TQ5504756963; 51°17′27″N 0°13′20″E | 1243497 | Church of St Peter and St Paul More images |
| Garden walls adjoining Knole House | Knole Park | Garden Wall | | 13 April 1951 | TQ5382754067; 51°15′54″N 0°12′12″E | 1204403 | Garden walls adjoining Knole House More images |
| Knole House | Knole | House | Late 15th century | 14 April 1951 | TQ5396854190; 51°15′58″N 0°12′20″E | 1336390 | Knole House More images |
| Church of St Peter and St Paul | Shoreham | Church | Norman | 10 September 1954 | TQ5227961590; 51°19′59″N 0°11′04″E | 1243786 | Church of St Peter and St Paul More images |
| Church of St Mary | Sundridge, Sundridge with Ide Hill | Church | Norman | 10 September 1954 | TQ4861854950; 51°16′28″N 0°07′45″E | 1272651 | Church of St Mary More images |
| Combe Bank | Sundridge, Sundridge with Ide Hill | Villa/School | Second quarter of 18th century | 10 September 1954 | TQ4804455756; 51°16′54″N 0°07′17″E | 1243769 | Combe Bank More images |
| Stable block to north east of Combe Bank | Sundridge, Sundridge with Ide Hill | Courtyard | Early 19th century | 10 September 1954 | TQ4808355817; 51°16′56″N 0°07′19″E | 1272637 | Upload Photo |
| Church of Saint Edmund | West Kingsdown | Church | Saxon | 1 June 1967 | TQ5799263353; 51°20′50″N 0°16′02″E | 1267477 | Church of Saint Edmund More images |
| Chartwell | Chartwell, Westerham | House | 16th century or 17th century | 16 January 1975 | TQ4550451523; 51°14′40″N 0°05′00″E | 1272626 | Chartwell More images |
| Quebec House | Westerham | House | Possibly 1501 | 10 September 1954 | TQ4492254053; 51°16′02″N 0°04′33″E | 1244133 | Quebec House More images |
| Squerryes Court | Westerham | House | Early 18th century | 10 September 1954 | TQ4411453406; 51°15′42″N 0°03′51″E | 1272592 | Squerryes Court More images |
