= Stubbs Wood Country Park =

Park in Kent, England

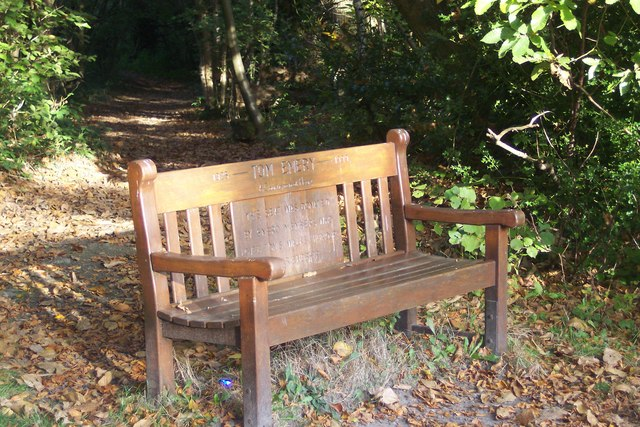
- Stubbs Wood Bench looking towards Bough Beech Reservoir

- Location within Kent
- OS grid: TQ496518
- Coordinates: 51°14′30″N 0°08′41″E
- Area: 102.172 hectares (252.47 acres)
- Operator: Sundridge with Ide Hill Parish Council,
- Open: 7 days a week, dawn until dusk
- Website: Official website

Stubbs Wood Country Park is in Sevenoaks, in Kent, England. It is located on the Greensand Ridge, close to Ide Hill village. The site is owned and managed by Sundridge with Ide Hill Parish Council.

== History ==
In 1769, it was part of Whitley Forest, which has remained largely intact due to the varied geology and poor soil types on the Greensand escarpment, which are unsuitable for intensive farming.

The forest is a Site of Special Scientific Interest as part of the larger Scords Wood and Brockhoult Mount area (which includes Toys Hill). The ancient forest is home to some plants that are scarce in Kent.

The forest suffered badly in the Great Storm of 1987. Replanting was partly funded by the Ide Hill Society with monies given to the National Trust and Kent County Council. Some huge ancient oak and beech trees survived the gales. Holly, whitebeam, ash, chestnut, hazel and rowan trees are present. Bluebells carpet the ground in the spring.

== Ownership ==
On April 4, 2014 Stubbs Wood was put up for sale by Kent County Council, which announced a three-week consultation period. With the intention of keeping public ownership of the woods, a campaign was started. The woodland, which is part of a Site of Special Scientific Interest and also part of the Green Belt, has a number of restrictive covenants which limit its potential future use, it also includes a network of public footpaths, which needed to be retained. Sundridge with Ide Hill Parish Council took over the ownership and management of the site in 2015.

== Hanging Bank ==
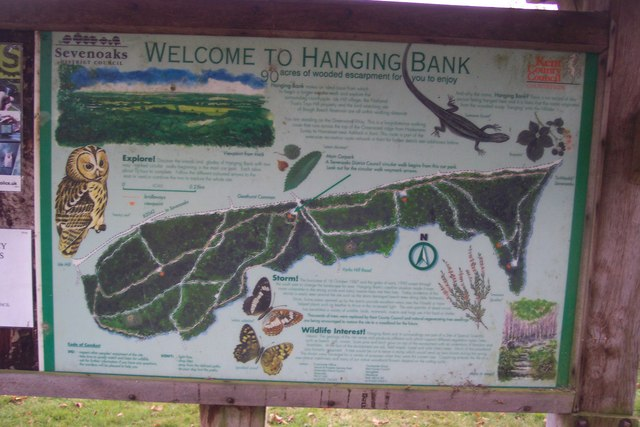
Hanging Bank Information Board

A part of the forest near to Ide Hill is known as Hanging Bank. On 28 January 1554, during Wyatt's rebellion against Queen Mary, a rebel force of about 500 men led by Henry Isley clashed with a similar-sized loyal force led by Lord Abergavenny and Sir Robert Southwell, at Wrotham Hill. After a running battle over about 4 miles (6 km), the rebels made their last stand at Hartley Wood, where they were defeated. A gallows was set up in the wood and many people were hanged.

== Lady Amherst's Drive ==
Sarah Amherst was the first wife of William Amherst, 1st Earl Amherst, who was Governor-General of India from 1823 to 1828. Born William Pitt Amherst, he inherited the Montreal estate on the outskirts of nearby Sevenoaks from his great uncle Jeffrey Amherst, 1st Baron Amherst, who commanded the British forces in Canada who took Quebec (under General Wolfe) and Montreal – hence the name of his estate. While the estate house was long ago demolished, Wolf’s own Quebec House in nearby Westerham is now under the management of the National Trust. The Amhersts were responsible for introducing the Asian game bird known as Lady Amherst's pheasant to Bedfordshire. Lady Amherst was fond of a drive along the Greensand Ridge through Stubbs Wood with its panoramic views of Kent.

The drive follows the line of the ancient road, the route from Bessels Green (near Sevenoaks) and Sundridge leading through Whitley Forest to Ide Hill. In the late 18th century, this track was re-routed via Goathurst Common and made into a road.

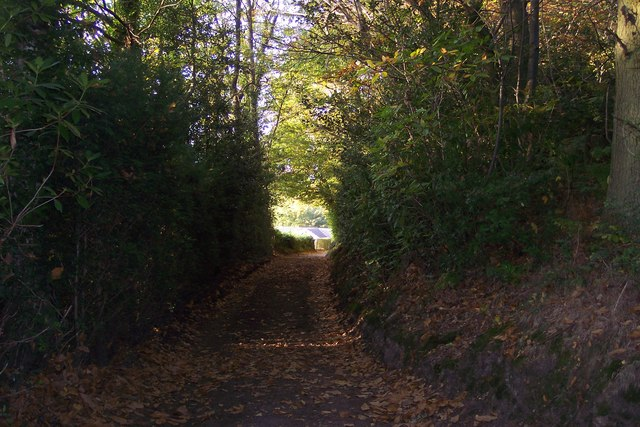
Stubbs Wood Track

== Greensand Way ==
Lady Amherst's Drive (now a track) remains as the footpath through Stubbs Wood from Sevenoaks Weald to Ide Hill. Walk 6 in Walking in Kent (Ide Hill to Manor Farm and then back to Ide Hill) follows the route through the wood.

Parts of the forest are accessible via horseback and bicycle on the public bridleways. Some of the paths at the top of the greensand ridge are suitable for people with walking difficulties, but others (near the Hanging Bank) are very steep.
