= Lectionary 28 =

Lectionary ℓ 28
- New Testament manuscript
- Text: Evangelistarion
- Date: 13th-century
- Script: Greek
- Now at: Bodleian Library
- Size: 25.5 cm by 19.5 cm
- Hand: carelessly written
- Note: ornamented

Lectionary 28, designated by siglum ℓ 28 (in the Gregory-Aland numbering), is a Greek manuscript of the New Testament, on parchment leaves. Palaeographically it has been assigned to the 13th-century.

== Description ==
The codex contains lessons from the Gospels of John, Matthew, Luke lectionary (Evangelistarium), with lacunae. It is written in Greek minuscule letters, on 198 parchment leaves (25.5 cm by 19.5 cm), in 2 columns per page, 20-24 lines per page. It contains musical notes. It is ornamented. The manuscript was written by two careless hands.

== History ==
The codex was examined by Thomas Mangey and Griesbach. C. R. Gregory saw it in 1883.

The manuscript is not cited in the critical editions of the Greek New Testament (UBS3).

Currently the codex is located in the Bodleian Library (Auct. D. inf. 2. 14) in Oxford.

== See also ==
- List of New Testament lectionaries
- Biblical manuscript
- Textual criticism

== Bibliography ==
- Gregory, Caspar René (1900). Textkritik des Neuen Testaments. Vol. 1. Leipzig: J.C. Hinrichs. p. 389.
