= Lectionary 26 =

Lectionary ℓ 26
- New Testament manuscript
- Text: Evangelistarion
- Date: 13th-century
- Script: Greek
- Now at: Bodleian Library
- Size: 21 cm by 15 cm

Lectionary 26, designated by siglum ℓ 26 (in the Gregory-Aland numbering). It is a Greek manuscript of the New Testament, on vellum leaves. Palaeographically it has been assigned to the 13th-century.

== Description ==
The codex contains lessons from the Gospels of John, Matthew, Luke lectionary (Evangelistarium), with lacunae. It is written in Greek minuscule letters, on 180 parchment leaves (21 cm by 15 cm), 1 column per page, 16-28 lines per page. It is a Palimpsest, the lower earlier text was written by uncial hand, it contains another lectionary (ℓ 1954) and text of Mark 3:15-32; 5:16-31 from the 8th century, classified as Uncial 0134. The earlier uncial text is difficult to read. The codex is in wretched condition.

== History ==
The text of lectionary was collated by Thomas Mangey (along with Lectionary 27). The codex was merely examined by Griesbach (Symb. crit., 2,18-23). C. R. Gregory saw it in 1883.

The manuscript is sporadically cited in the critical editions of the Greek New Testament (UBS3).

Currently the codex is located in the Bodleian Library (Selden Supra 2) in Oxford.

== See also ==
- List of New Testament lectionaries
- Biblical manuscript
- Textual criticism

== Bibliography ==
- Gregory, Caspar René (1900). Textkritik des Neuen Testaments. Vol. 1. Leipzig: J.C. Hinrichs. p. 389.
