= Lectionary 30 =

Lectionary ℓ 30
- New Testament manuscript
- Text: Evangelistarion, Apostolos
- Date: 1225
- Script: Greek
- Now at: Bodleian Library
- Size: 21.7 cm by 16 cm
- Hand: elegantly written

Lectionary 30, designated by siglum ℓ 30 in the Gregory-Aland numbering, is a Greek manuscript of the New Testament, on parchment leaves. It is dated by a colophon to the year 1225.

== Description ==
The codex contains lessons from the Gospels of John, Matthew, Luke lectionary (Evangelistarium), and from epistles for great feasts. It is written in Greek minuscule letters, on 105 parchment leaves (21.7 cm by 16 cm), 1 column per page, 15-24 lines per page. It contains musical notes.

== History ==
The manuscript was written by Michael, a calligrapher. The codex was examined by Thomas Mangey and Johann Jakob Griesbach. C. R. Gregory saw it in 1883.

The manuscript is not cited in the critical editions of the Greek New Testament (UBS3).

Currently the codex is located in the Bodleian Library (Cromwell 11, fol. 149-340) in Oxford.

== See also ==
- List of New Testament lectionaries
- Biblical manuscript
- Textual criticism

== Bibliography ==
- Gregory, Caspar René (1900). Textkritik des Neuen Testaments. Vol. 1. Leipzig: J.C. Hinrichs. p. 390.
