= Ide Hill =

Village in Kent, England

Coordinates: 51.247°N 0.129°E

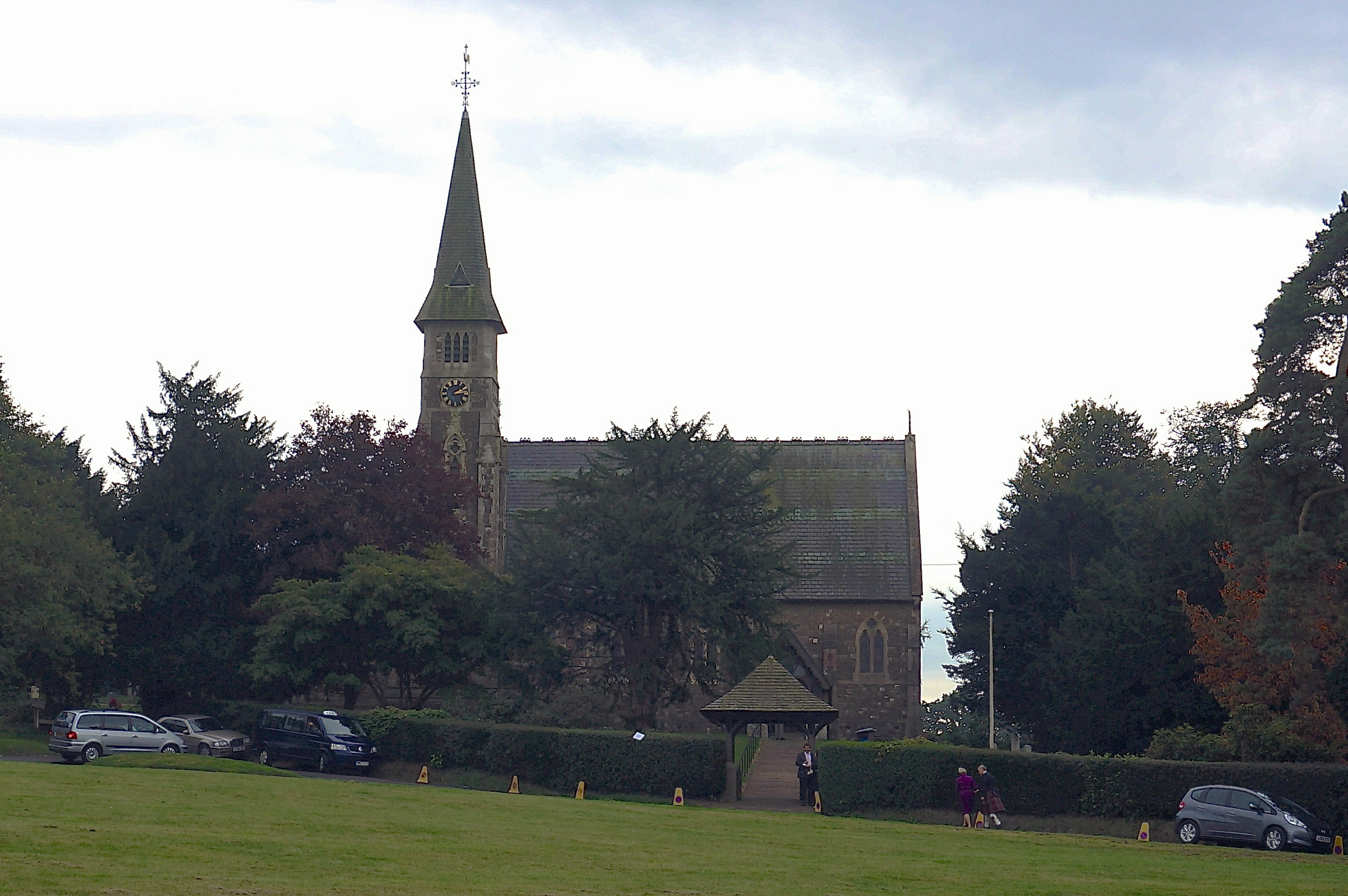
- St Mary's Church, Ide Hill, Kent

- Location within Kent
- OS grid reference: TQ486518
- Civil parish: Sundridge with Ide Hill
- District: Sevenoaks
- Shire county: Kent
- Region: South East
- Country: England
- Sovereign state: United Kingdom
- Post town: SEVENOAKS
- Postcode district: TN14
- Dialling code: 01732
- Police: Kent
- Fire: Kent
- Ambulance: South East Coast
- UK Parliament: Sevenoaks

Ide Hill is a village within the civil parish of Sundridge with Ide Hill, in the Sevenoaks District of Kent, England. It stands on one of the highest points of the Greensand Ridge about three miles south-west of Sevenoaks. Its name first appears on record in 1250 as Edythehelle. It is an eponymic denoting 'Edith's hill', from the Old English hyll 'hill'. The village lies within the Kent Downs Area of Outstanding Natural Beauty.

The church is relatively modern. The village had an Anglican chapel in 1806, built by Beilby Porteus, Bishop of London, who lived in nearby Sundridge; St Mary's church was built in 1865 and "has the distinction of being the highest church in Kent" at 216 metres (709 ft) above sea level. There are several old buildings round the sloping village green, including the 18th-century Cock Inn and the Ide Hill Village School, built in 1856 it is the second home of the school which unusually for a church school predates the church building as the school was formed in 1809.

Ide Hill Football Club, who have teams in the Kent County League, the Sevenoaks & District League and the Crowborough & District Junior League, play their home games on the Ide Hill Recreation Ground (behind the Cock Inn). As per the church, the football pitch "has the distinction of being the highest in Kent".

Ide Hill has a Cricket Ground where the local Cricket team Ide Hill CC, play their home fixtures located on Sundridge Road.

Two of Kent's places of interest are near Ide Hill: Bough Beech Reservoir and Emmetts Garden.

Bough Beech Reservoir was completed in 1969. A large area round it is leased to the Kent Trust for Nature Conservation as a nature reserve.

Emmetts Garden is in the care of the National Trust. It was laid out in the late 19th century. There is a stone seat near the village church to commemorate Octavia Hill, one of the Trust's founders.

In his 1933 memoir Down and Out in Paris and London George Orwell reports that Ide Hill was notorious for being the worst “spike” (a casual ward or homeless shelter) in all of England. Although in a footnote he confesses to finding it 'not so bad'.

== Goathurst Common ==
Goathurst Common is a hamlet within the civil parish of Sundridge with Ide Hill. It lies to the east of Ide Hill. Its road, Bessels Green Road, leads through Whitley Forest to the village of Bessels Green, near Sevenoaks to the south. There is no current chapel or church. The hamlet did have two but they have been converted into houses. It is a mainly residential area consisting of about sixty houses built since the early 1920s. Goathurst Common is separated from Ide Hill by Stubbs Wood.

The playing field in Goathurst Common plays host every August Bank Holiday to the Annual Goat Hurling World Championships. This is a modern invocation of an ancient past time that may have given the Hamlet its name. The event was revived to celebrate Queen Elizabeth the Second's Golden Jubilee on the 2nd of June 2002 and has been held every August Bank Holiday since. Unlike its ancient predecessor, a plush toy goat is hurled across a 30m marked playing area. No goats are harmed during the event.

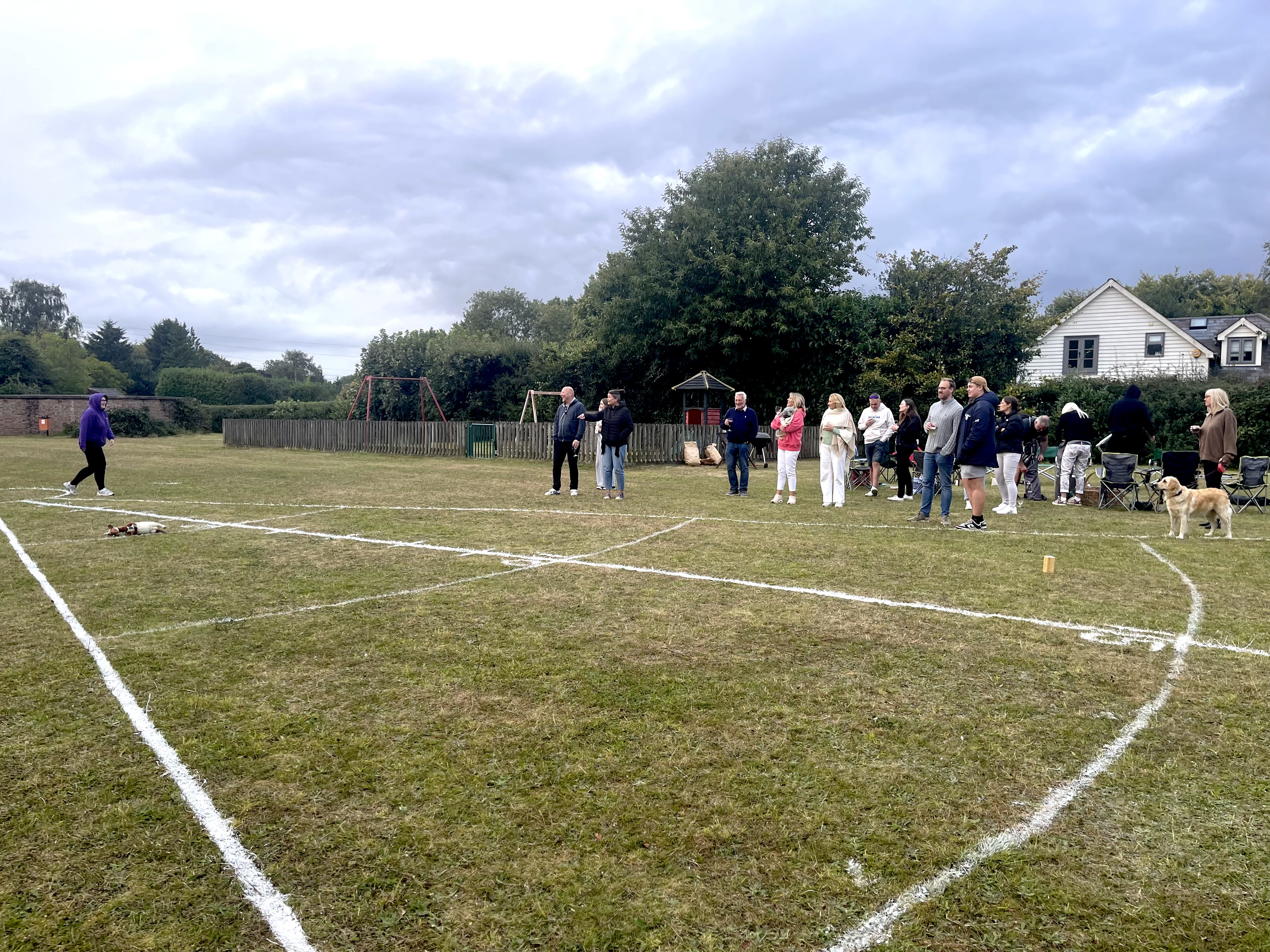
Goathurst Common locals enjoy the ancient tradition of Goat Hurling

The woodlands around Goathurst Common were devastated during the Great Storm of 1987, when many trees were brought down by very high winds.
