= Lectionary 27 =

Lectionary ℓ 27
- New Testament manuscript
- Text: Evangelistarion
- Date: 14th-century
- Script: Greek
- Now at: Bodleian Library
- Size: 23 cm by 18 cm

Lectionary 27, designated by siglum ℓ 27 (in the Gregory-Aland numbering), is a Greek manuscript of the New Testament, on parchment leaves. Palaeographically it has been assigned to the 14th-century.

== Description ==
The codex contains lessons from the Gospels of Matthew, Luke lectionary (Evangelistarium), with lacunae. It is written in Greek uncial and minuscule letters (89-95 folios), on 150 parchment leaves (23 cm by 18 cm), 2 columns per page, 21 lines per page. The uncial letters are large and ill-formed. It has numerous errors. It contains a Palimpsest, the lower earlier text written by uncial hand, it contains Lectionary 1955 from the 9th century.

== History ==
The text of the lectionary was collated by Thomas Mangey in 1749 (together with Lectionary 26).

The codex was merely examined by Griesbach.

The manuscript is not cited in the critical editions of the Greek New Testament (UBS3).

Currently the codex is located in the Bodleian Library (Selden Supora 3) in Oxford.

== See also ==
- List of New Testament lectionaries
- Biblical manuscript
- Textual criticism

== Bibliography ==
- Johann Jakob Griesbach, Symbolae criticae ad supplendas et corrigendas variarum Novi Testamenti lectionum collectiones. T. 1. Accedit Multorum N. T. Codicum Graecorum Descriptio Et Examen. Halle: Curt 1793, pp. 23–26.
