= Edward Tenison =

Irish bishop (1673–1735)

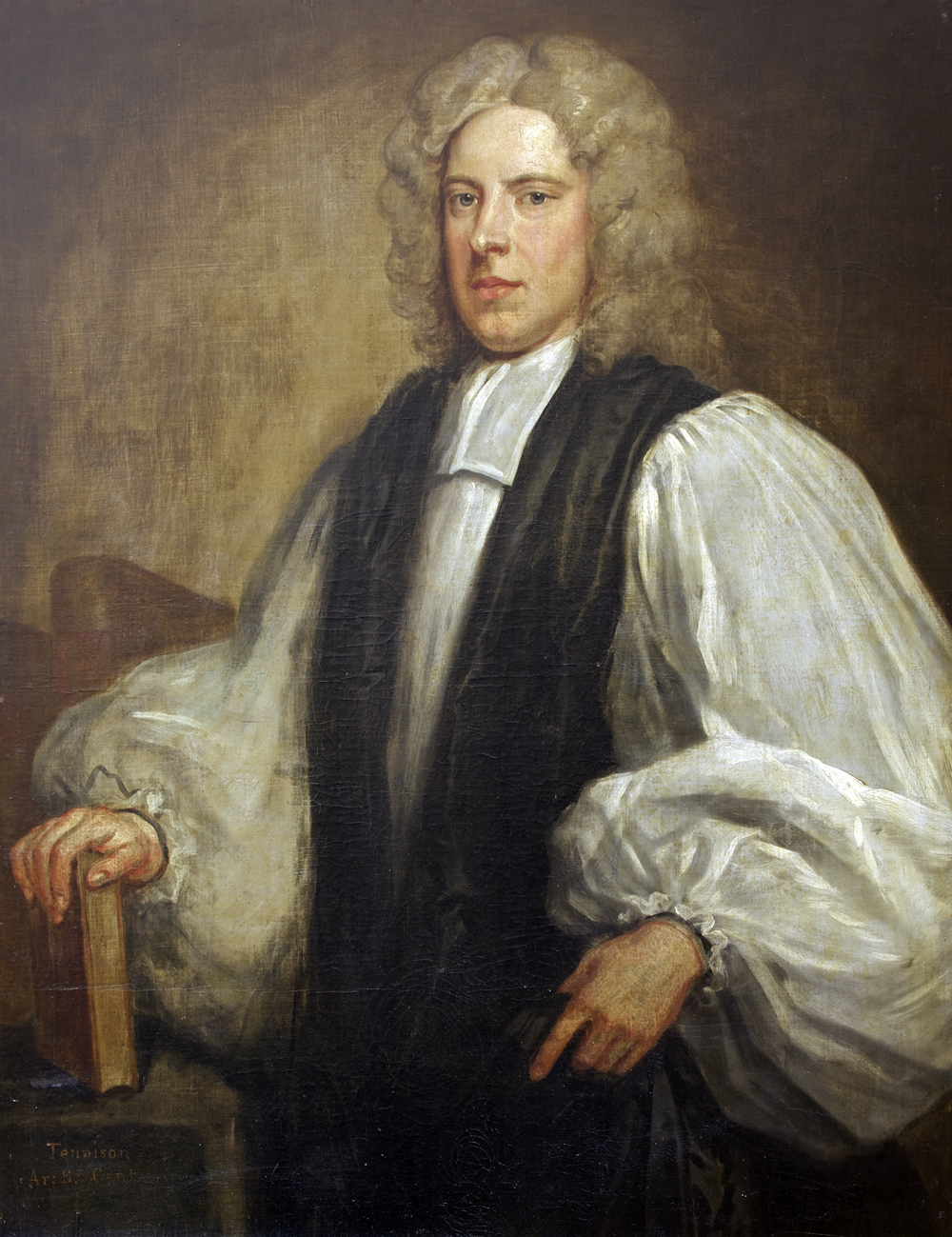
Edward Tenison, portrait by John Vanderbank

Edward Tenison (1673–1735) was an English bishop of Ossory. An example of the workings of the system of patronage in the Church of England, Tenison also was a significant Whig and controversialist.

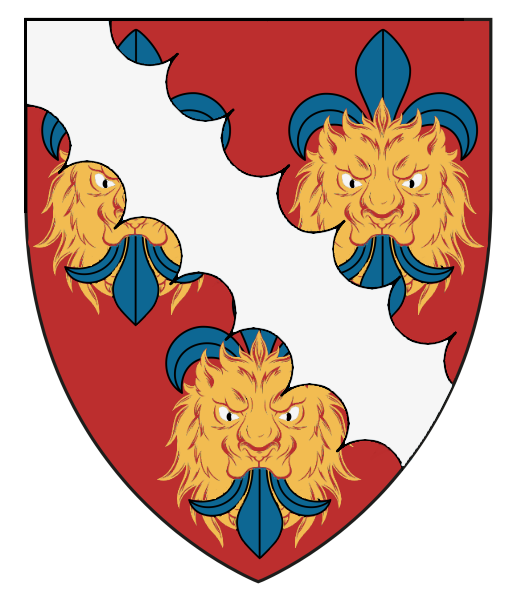
Arms of Tenison: Gules, three leopard's faces or jessant de lys azure overall a bend engrailed argent. A difference of these arms was borne by Tennyson, the family of Alfred, Lord Tennyson (1809–1892) (Baron Tennyson), the poet

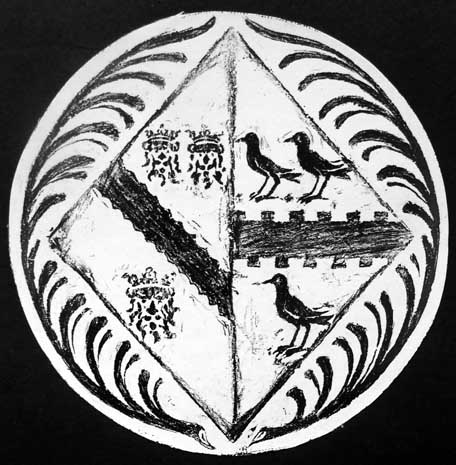
Arms of Tenison impaling Searle (or Sayer), detail from his widow's ledger stone in Canterbury Cathedral. The jessant-de-lys charges in the arms of Tenison have been misinterpreted by the stonemason as leopard's heads ducally crowned, with forked beards

== Early life ==
Baptised at Norwich on 3 April 1673, he was the only surviving child of Joseph Tenison of Norwich by his wife Margaret, daughter of Edward Mileham of Burlingham in Norfolk. Philip Tenison, archdeacon of Norfolk, was his grandfather and Thomas Tenison, Archbishop of Canterbury, a cousin. Thomas Browne who had married another daughter of Mileham was therefore an uncle, and Tenison was in later life on good terms with his daughter Elizabeth Lyttelton, the writer.

After being educated at St Paul's School, London under Thomas Gale, he was admitted a scholar of Corpus Christi College, Cambridge, on 19 February 1691. He graduated B.A. in 1694, and proceeded LL.B. in 1697 and D.D. in 1731, the last two being Lambeth degrees. Tenison was at first intended for law, and was bound apprentice to his uncle, Charles Mileham, an attorney at Great Yarmouth.

== Whig rector in Kent ==
Abandoning the law for the church, he was ordained deacon and priest in 1697, and presented the same year to the rectory of Wittersham, Kent. This he resigned in 1698 on being presented to the rectory of Sundridge in the Diocese of Rochester, which he held with the adjacent rectory of Chiddingstone. On 24 March 1705 he was made a prebendary of Lichfield Cathedral, resigning in 1708 on being appointed archdeacon of Carmarthen, in favour of George Fage, a relation and fellow-student at Corpus.

A Whig supporter, in the minority in Kent in a bitterly contested election, he reported on the derision those in his position endured. The memory of the Kentish Petition of 1701 endured, with David Polhill who had been a petitioner standing for election in 1710; and Tenison wrote to him in October of that year about it. Kent was also a sphere of influence of the Sackville family, Earls of Dorset, later patrons of Tenison.

Tenison became the chaplain to the Prince of Wales immediately after the succession of George I of Great Britain.

== Controversialist ==
In 1714 Tenison inherited considerable estates from his uncle, Edward Tenison of Lambeth, who was steward to Archbishop Tenison and left £12,000; but he subsequently lost most of his wealth in 1720 by investing it in the South Sea Company. In 1715 he acted as executor to his cousin the archbishop, and was in consequence involved in litigation on the question of dilapidations with Archbishop William Wake. Correspondence on the subject was published by him in 1716. The surveyor involved in estimating the dilapidations of the episcopal palaces was John James, who defended himself in print against what he called Tenison's "cavils and misrepresentations". Wake asked for dilapidations of £3469. The claim was referred to Peter King, Chief Justice of the Common Pleas, and John Bettesworth, Dean of the Arches, as arbitrators, with the Bishop of Lichfield as moderator. The arbitrators awarded Wake £2800.

Tenison was a supporter of Benjamin Hoadly in the Bangorian controversy. In February 1718 he clashed with George Stanhope in the lower house of Convocation; Stanhope was prolocutor of the house, and interrupted Tenison who was about to read a speech in favour of Hoadly by reading the formula proroguing the sitting. The incident led to a pamphlet war, and rebounded on Stanhope. Tenison contended that Archbishop Wake had disapproved of moves made against Hoadly; Stanhope replied, and then Thomas Herne in an anonymous pamphlet supported Tenison. The Three Discourses of the Swiss theologian Samuel Werenfels, translated by Herne, were an intervention in the controversy on Hoadly's side, and were addressed to Tenison.

== In Wales ==
Tenison was archdeacon of Carmarthen until 1727. He made a survey of some of Wales on foot. He noted in 1710 that the absence of services in the Welsh language drove local people to the chapels of the Dissenters. There are surviving notes in his handwriting on parishes in the diocese of St Davids where he was given a power of deputy, between the bishops George Bull and Philip Bisse.

He made two attempts to settle in Wales: first, by buying an estate in Anglesey that was in a chancery case, only to lose his deposit on it with the South Sea Bubble; and secondly by living with his family on Anglesey for a period from 1723. In the end he took a job as Proctor at Canterbury, in a deal whereby his son Thomas would become archdeacon, with the living of Chiddingstone, and John Lynch would have the living of Sundridge.

== In Ireland ==
Tenison served as Bishop of Ossory in Ireland from 1730/1 to 1735. He appears to have owed this promotion to the newly appointed Lord Lieutenant, Lionel Sackville, 1st Duke of Dorset, acting in concert with Archbishop Hugh Boulter; Tenison was the Duke's first chaplain.

Tenison introduced a Bill of Residence in the Irish Parliament in December 1731, and became a literary target for Jonathan Swift. Swift found Tenison's politics objectionable, and in his poem On the Irish Bishops attacked Tenison's support for the Bill of Residence, and a Bill of Division, both concerned with Irish clerical livings. The phrase "baboon of Kilkenny" in the poem is taken to be an allusion to Tenison. In February 1732 the Bills passed the Irish House of Lords but were rejected by the Irish House of Commons. Swift left a manuscript giving the case against the Bill.

Tenison was buried in St Mary's Church, Dublin.

== Works ==
Tenison published:

- Visitatio Archidiaconatus Maridunensis, 1710
- The Husbandry of Canary Seed, in Philosophical Transactions, 1713
- A Protestation Made on the 14th day of February 1717/18 on behalf of the King's Supremacy and the Protestant documents. This and the next relate to the Bangorian Controversy.
- A Letter to the Reverend the Prolocutor Being an Answer to That Part of His Letter That Relates to the King's Supremacy.

He edited the De Re Rustica of Columella (2 vols., 1732). Tenison was known as a book collector.

== Family ==
He married Ann Searle or Sayer, a niece of Thomas Tenison, having three sons, and five daughters. The son Thomas (1702–1742) was a churchman, taking over from his father as archdeacon of Carmarthen in 1727; and became prebendary of Canterbury in 1739. Their daughter Henrietta (Margaret) married the Huguenot Peter St. Eloy as his fourth wife.
