= De Bolotoff SDEB 14 =

SDEB 14

General information
- Type: Two-seat utility biplane
- National origin: United Kingdom
- Manufacturer: de Boltoff Aeroplane Works
- Number built: 1

The De Bolotoff SDEB 14 was a British two-seat utility biplane designed by Prince Serge de Bolotoff and one example was built at his de Bolotoff Aeroplane Works at Sundridge Aerodrome, Sundridge, near Sevenoaks, Kent. It was registered G-EAKC on 14 August 1919. The SDEB 14 was powered by a 200 hp (149 kW) Curtiss V-3 V-8 water-cooled piston engine, driving a tractor propeller.

== Specifications ==
Data from British Civil Aircraft since 1919 - Volume 3

General characteristics

- Crew: 2
- Wingspan: 36 ft 0 in (10.98 m)
- Powerplant: 1 × Curtiss V-3 V-8 water-cooled piston engine , 200 hp (149 kW)
