= Sundridge with Ide Hill =

Civil parish in Kent, England

Coordinates: 51.1642°N 0.0739°E

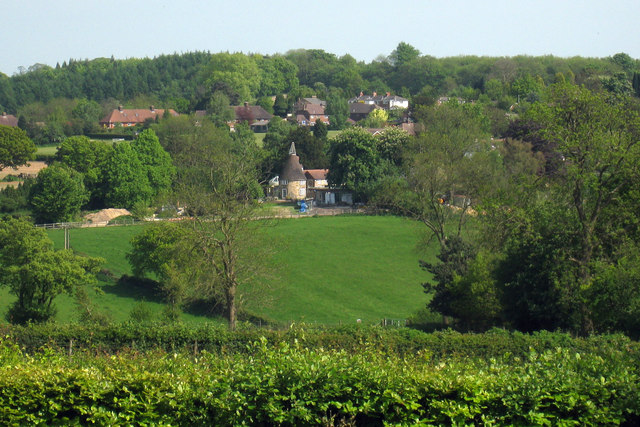
- View to Oast House at Rondavel, Sundridge Road, Ide Hill.

- Location within Kent
- Population: 1,877
- Civil parish: Sundridge with Ide Hill
- Shire county: Kent
- Region: South East
- Country: England
- Sovereign state: United Kingdom
- Post town: Sevenoaks
- Postcode district: TN14
- Police: Kent
- Fire: Kent
- Ambulance: South East Coast

Sundridge and Ide Hill is a civil parish in the Sevenoaks District of Kent, England. It is located in the Darenth valley and lies between Sevenoaks and Westerham. The parish contains the villages of Sundridge and Ide Hill and the hamlet of Goathurst Common. It lies within the Kent Downs Area of Outstanding Natural Beauty and within London's Metropolitan Green Belt. It is approximately 21 miles south of London.

The parish was created in 1973, when the settlements of Sundridge and Ide Hill were merged into a parish. Between the two villages is Emmetts Garden, a National Trust property.

According to the 2011 census, the total population of the parish was 1,877. Of that total, there were 917 males and 960 females living in the parish.

== History ==
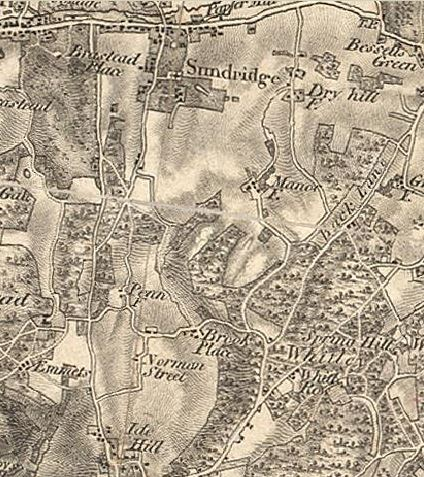
Map showing Sundridge with Ide Hill in the 19th century.

The history of the parish dates back over 1000 years to some of the earliest recorded times in the UK. Sundridge Church was known to have existed in 862, "probably as a wooden structure, and later was recorded in the Domesday Book". The parish is quoted in the Domesday Book (1086) as having "27 villagers with 9 smallholders and 8 slaves". It was also under the lordship of the Archbishop of Canterbury during this time period, due to its location in Kent. Among the many historic buildings located in the parish lies Old Hall on Main Road, which dates all the way back to “1458, is thought to be the oldest original building” in the parish.

In the 19th century, John Marius Wilson's Imperial Gazetteer of England and Wales described the parish as:

Sundridge, "a village and a parish in Sevenoaks district, Kent. The village stands 3¼ miles WSW of Sevenoaks r. station; has a post-office under Sevenoaks; and gives the title of Baron to the Duke of Argyle".

The name Ide Hill first appears on record in 1250 as Edythehelle. It is an eponymic denoting 'Edith's hill', from the Old English hyll 'hill'.

== Demographics ==
=== Population ===
The population of the parish has seen large changes since monitoring of the population began back in 1801. In 1801, they were 373 males and 342 females living in the parish. The population steadily grew over the 19th and 20th century, peaking in 1960 with a total population of 2,248 living in the parish, split between 1,035 males and 1,213 females. Since the 1960s, the total population has begun to gradually decline and the latest population figures from the 2011 census show that the parish has a population of 1,877, a 16% decrease from the peak population in 1960.

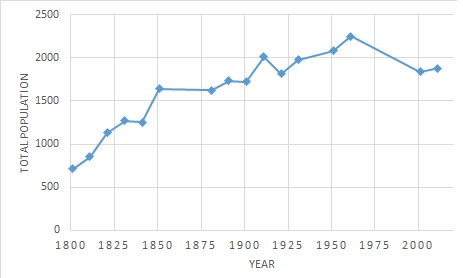
Total Population of Sundridge with Ide Hill from 1801 to 2011.

=== Occupations ===
In 1881, the occupational structure for males in the parish was dominated by the Agricultural sector which was similar to many parishes across the country during this time period. Just under half of the 441 working men in the parish worked in the agriculture sector with a total of 183 in the sector which was no doubt the dominant industry at the time. The 2nd largest male occupation was those that worked in the General or Unspecified Commodities industry which was also closely linked to the Agriculture sector which suggests that the Agriculture industry was indirectly linked to over half of Male Occupations in 1881. The female occupational structure was of a stark contrast to the males in 1881. Women in the UK in the 19th century were prevented and/or looked down upon from working in certain occupations such as agriculture, mining and substance services. This was because the societal view in the 19th century was that a "woman's place was in the home" and it was their duty to look after their children and care for their husband. Of the entire 403 working women, 226 women were listed as having unknown occupations which suggests they were either unemployed or only undertook smaller, unlisted jobs. Domestic Services or Offices was the largest listed female industry in the parish and 103 women worked in this industry.

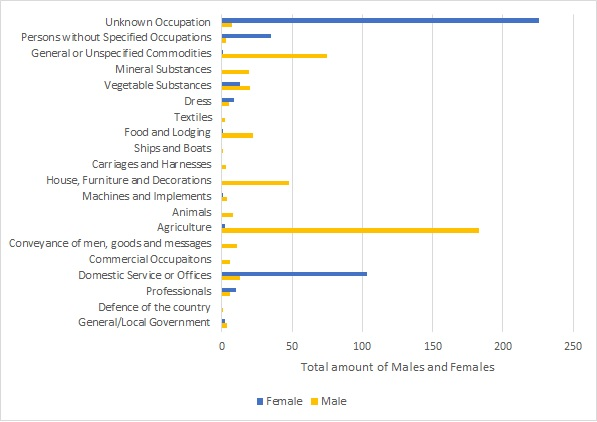
Occupational structure for Sundridge with Ide Hill in 1881.

The 2011 occupational structure in the parish between women and men is much more similar than that of the 1881 occupational structure. The total working men in the parish increased to 528 from the 441 in 1881, a slight increase obviously due to the population rise over the past two centuries. The agriculture industry which dominated the male occupational structure has completely diminished and no one in the parish, male or female works in the industry. The dominant industry for the males in the parish was those working in the skilled trades industry with 112 men working in the sector. Closely followed was those working in professional occupations with 101 men and those serving as managers, directors and senior officials in which 97 men were involved in this type of work. The total number of female workers in the parish also increased from 403 to 459 from 1881 to 2011. The occupational structure for females in the parish saw drastic change from that of the 1881 structure. Women are now able to pursue the same careers as men so the occupational structure is very much similar to the male one. The top female occupation was those in professional occupations, 94 women worked in this industry which is similar to their male counterparts. The 2nd most employed industry was the 90 women working in the administrative and secretarial positions. The proximity to London suggests why the parish has a significantly higher than average percentage of managers and directors living in the parish.

== Churches ==
St Mary's Church in Sundridge is a Grade I listed building, dating from the 12th century and enlarged in the 13th and 15th centuries.

St Mary's Church in Ide Hill was built in 1865–1866. It was designed by C. H. Cooke, and is Grade II* listed.

== Transport ==
The M25 otherwise known as the London Orbital Motorway passes through the parish which gives residents direct access into Central and Greater London by car.

The nearest train station to the parish is Sevenoaks railway station which is around 4.7 miles east in the town of Sevenoaks. The station runs on the South Eastern Main Line, which also provides easy access to London.

== Emmetts Garden ==
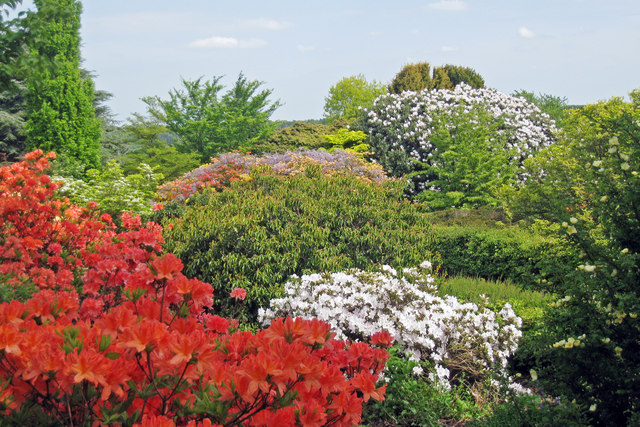
Emmetts Garden

Emmetts Garden is an Edwardian estate located in the parish. The estate "covers an area of about 4 acres at the highest point in Kent on the 600-foot sandstone ridge". On the estate there is a collection of exotic shrubs, a rose garden, a rock garden and an arboretum. It is owned and run by the National Trust because it is considered a place of Historic Interest or Natural Beauty. “The estate was created between 1890-1927 by an Edwardian gentleman named Frederick Lubbock as a weekend retreat for his family”. The estate was privately owned until 1965 when it opened to the public and came under control of the National Trust. In 1987, the estate and the surrounding area was badly damaged by the Great Storm of 1987 in particular the Arboretum. It was estimated that the Estate lost “95% of its mature trees” because of the storm.

== See also ==
- Listed buildings in Sundridge with Ide Hill
