= Listed buildings in Sundridge with Ide Hill =

Civil Parish in Kent, England

Sundridge with Ide Hill is a village and civil parish in the Sevenoaks District of Kent, England. It contains three grade I, four grade II* and 77 grade II listed buildings that are recorded in the National Heritage List for England.

This list is based on the information retrieved online from Historic England.

== Key ==
Grade	Criteria
I	Buildings that are of exceptional interest
II*	Particularly important buildings of more than special interest
II	Buildings that are of special interest

== Listing ==
Name	Grade	Location	Type	Completed (Note: The date given is the date used by Historic England as significant for the initial building or that of an important part in the structure's description.)	Date designated	Grid ref. (Note: The grid reference is based on the British national grid reference system, sometimes known as OSGB36, used by the Ordnance Survey.) Geo-coordinates	Notes	Entry number (Note: The "List Entry Number" is a unique number assigned to each listed building and scheduled monument by Historic England.)	Image	Wikidata
3 Aircraft Hangars to Former Sundridge Aerodrome at Coombe Bank Farm	II	Chevening Road, Coombe Bank Farm			27 April 1988	TQ4848655803; 51°16′55″N 0°07′40″E		1244242	Upload Photo	Q26536871
Little Combe Bank	II	Chevening Road, Sundridge			10 September 1954	TQ4846355552; 51°16′47″N 0°07′38″E		1243920	Upload Photo	Q26536570
Wall Around Courtyard to West of Little Combe Bank	II	Chevening Road, Sundridge			16 January 1975	TQ4844255549; 51°16′47″N 0°07′37″E		1272639	Upload Photo	Q26562462
1, Church Road	II	1, Church Road, Sundridge			16 January 1975	TQ4850155372; 51°16′41″N 0°07′40″E		1243760	Upload Photo	Q26536426
18-22, Church Road	II	18-22, Church Road, Sundridge			10 September 1954	TQ4849455303; 51°16′39″N 0°07′39″E		1243764	Upload Photo	Q26536430
3 and 5, Church Road	II	3 and 5, Church Road, Sundridge			2 July 1974	TQ4850455367; 51°16′41″N 0°07′40″E		1243880	Upload Photo	Q26536533
7-11, Church Road	II	7-11, Church Road, Sundridge			16 January 1975	TQ4850455350; 51°16′41″N 0°07′40″E		1272751	Upload Photo	Q26562565
94-98, Church Road	II	94-98, Church Road, Sundridge			10 September 1954	TQ4848454902; 51°16′26″N 0°07′38″E		1243767	Upload Photo	Q26536433
Birchfield Cottage	II	Church Road, Sundridge			16 January 1975	TQ4842454195; 51°16′03″N 0°07′34″E		1243763	Upload Photo	Q26536429
Boundary Wall to West of Grounds of the Old Rectory	II	Church Road, Sundridge			16 January 1975	TQ4849855234; 51°16′37″N 0°07′39″E		1272721	Upload Photo	Q26562538
Chapman's Farmhouse	II	Church Road, Sundridge			10 September 1954	TQ4847454991; 51°16′29″N 0°07′38″E		1243766	Upload Photo	Q26536432
Church of St Mary	I	Church Road, Sundridge			10 September 1954	TQ4861854950; 51°16′28″N 0°07′45″E		1272651	Church of St Mary More images	Q17529905
Garden Walls to East and North of Sundridge Place	II	Church Road, Sundridge			10 September 1954	TQ4865954876; 51°16′25″N 0°07′47″E		1243896	Upload Photo	Q26536548
Large Barn to South East of Sundridge Place with Outbuildings Adjoining	II	Church Road, Sundridge			10 September 1954	TQ4864954818; 51°16′23″N 0°07′47″E		1272722	Upload Photo	Q26562539
Lych Gate to West of Church of St Mary	II	Church Road, Sundridge			16 January 1975	TQ4858054953; 51°16′28″N 0°07′43″E		1243762	Upload Photo	Q26536428
Sundridge Hospital	II	Church Road			15 April 1999	TQ4822453681; 51°15′47″N 0°07′23″E		1386580	Upload Photo	Q26666272
Sundridge Place	II	Church Road, Sundridge			10 September 1954	TQ4861754844; 51°16′24″N 0°07′45″E		1243895	Upload Photo	Q26536547
The Clock House Stores	II	15 and 17, Church Road, Sundridge			16 January 1975	TQ4850355335; 51°16′40″N 0°07′40″E		1243761	Upload Photo	Q26536427
The Manor House	II	42, Church Road, Sundridge			10 September 1954	TQ4847455217; 51°16′36″N 0°07′38″E		1243765	Upload Photo	Q26536431
The Old Rectory	II*	Church Road, Sundridge			10 September 1954	TQ4852255231; 51°16′37″N 0°07′41″E		1243893	Upload Photo	Q17545609
The Red House	II	Church Road, Sundridge			16 January 1975	TQ4839854812; 51°16′23″N 0°07′34″E		1243914	Upload Photo	Q26536564
The White House	II	Church Road, Sundridge			16 January 1975	TQ4843554797; 51°16′23″N 0°07′36″E		1243768	Upload Photo	Q26536434
Wall to South of the Manor House	II	Church Road, Sundridge			16 January 1975	TQ4848655181; 51°16′35″N 0°07′39″E		1272634	Upload Photo	Q26562458
Well Cottage	II	Church Road, Sundridge			10 September 1954	TQ4846554980; 51°16′29″N 0°07′37″E		1272635	Upload Photo	Q26562459
Stable Block to North East of Combe Bank	I	Combe Bank, Radnor House Sevenoaks School, Combe Bank Drive, Sundridge, TN14 6AE			10 September 1954	TQ4808355817; 51°16′56″N 0°07′19″E		1272637	Upload Photo	Q17529901
Combe Bank	I	Combe Bank Drive, Sundridge, TN14 6AE			10 September 1954	TQ4804455756; 51°16′54″N 0°07′17″E		1243769	Combe Bank More images	Q97655051
Dibgate Farmhouse	II	Combe Bank Road, Sundridge			10 September 1954	TQ4847455738; 51°16′53″N 0°07′39″E		1243921	Upload Photo	Q26536571
Rustic Arch and Bridge	II	Combe Bank Road, Sundridge			25 April 1994	TQ4823255672; 51°16′51″N 0°07′26″E		1272457	Upload Photo	Q26562290
Dry Hill Cottage the Old Cottage	II	Dryhill Lane, Dryhill			16 January 1975	TQ4955655042; 51°16′30″N 0°08′34″E		1243922	Upload Photo	Q26536572
Dryhill Farmhouse	II	Dryhill Lane, Dryhill Farm			10 September 1954	TQ4958454904; 51°16′25″N 0°08′35″E		1272641	Upload Photo	Q26562464
Large Barn to North West of Dryhill Farmhouse	II	Dryhill Lane, Dryhill Farm			16 January 1975	TQ4955254916; 51°16′26″N 0°08′33″E		1243924	Upload Photo	Q26536574
Old Garden Wall to East of Dryhill Farmhouse	II	Dryhill Lane, Dryhill Farm			10 September 1954	TQ4960154904; 51°16′25″N 0°08′36″E		1243925	Upload Photo	Q26536575
Outbuilding to North East of Dryhill Farmhouse	II	Dryhill Lane, Dryhill Farm			16 January 1975	TQ4959554931; 51°16′26″N 0°08′36″E		1272642	Upload Photo	Q26562465
Small Barn to South East of Dryhill Farmhouse	II	Dryhill Lane, Dryhill Farm			16 January 1975	TQ4962154875; 51°16′24″N 0°08′37″E		1243961	Upload Photo	Q26536609
Wellers Farmhouse	II	Dryhill Lane, Wellers Farm			16 January 1975	TQ4956555138; 51°16′33″N 0°08′34″E		1272640	Upload Photo	Q26562463
White Shieling	II	Dryhill Lane, Sundridge			16 January 1975	TQ4951655010; 51°16′29″N 0°08′32″E		1243923	Upload Photo	Q26536573
Henden Manor House	II	Henden Manor, Ide Hill			10 September 1954	TQ4825450460; 51°14′03″N 0°07′20″E		1272749	Upload Photo	Q26562563
The Oast House, Henden Manor	II	Henden Manor, Ide Hill			16 January 1975	TQ4821850384; 51°14′00″N 0°07′18″E		1243758	Upload Photo	Q26536424
Anchor Cottage	II	Ide Hill			16 January 1975	TQ4856351820; 51°14′46″N 0°07′38″E		1243867	Upload Photo	Q26536521
Bridge Over Moat to South of Henden Manor House	II	Ide Hill			16 January 1975	TQ4828850450; 51°14′02″N 0°07′22″E		1243870	Upload Photo	Q26536524
Church of St Mary at South End of Village Green	II*	Ide Hill			10 September 1954	TQ4861651698; 51°14′42″N 0°07′40″E		1272747	Church of St Mary at South End of Village Green More images	Q17545831
Ide Hill Junior School	II	Ide Hill			16 January 1975	TQ4853951858; 51°14′48″N 0°07′37″E		1272748	Upload Photo	Q26562562
Ivy Cottage (hanging Bank)	II	Ide Hill			16 January 1975	TQ4891351475; 51°14′35″N 0°07′55″E		1272750	Upload Photo	Q26562564
K6 Telephone Kiosk	II	Ide Hill			27 September 1991	TQ4866851865; 51°14′48″N 0°07′43″E		1244279	Upload Photo	Q26536908
Old School House	II	Ide Hill			16 January 1975	TQ4847052007; 51°14′52″N 0°07′33″E		1243756	Upload Photo	Q26536422
The Cock Inn	II	Ide Hill			16 January 1975	TQ4867151889; 51°14′48″N 0°07′43″E		1243755	The Cock Inn More images	Q26536421
The Old Vicarage	II	Ide Hill			10 September 1954	TQ4864051624; 51°14′40″N 0°07′41″E		1243864	Upload Photo	Q26536518
Chains Farmhouse	II	Ide Hill Road, Chains Farm			16 January 1975	TQ4893650941; 51°14′18″N 0°07′56″E		1272679	Upload Photo	Q26562500
Gates and Piers to West of Oakwood Lodge	II	Ide Hill Road, Ide Hill			16 January 1975	TQ4876950878; 51°14′16″N 0°07′47″E		1272680	Upload Photo	Q26562501
Oak Lodge Farmhouse	II	Ide Hill Road, Ide Hill			16 January 1975	TQ4888649925; 51°13′45″N 0°07′52″E		1243752	Upload Photo	Q26536418
Oakwood Lodge	II	Ide Hill Road, Ide Hill			16 January 1975	TQ4878250876; 51°14′16″N 0°07′48″E		1243757	Upload Photo	Q26536423
The Red Lion Public House	II	Ide Hill Road, Ide Hill			16 January 1975	TQ4883749753; 51°13′39″N 0°07′49″E		1272745	Upload Photo	Q26562560
118, Main Road	II	118, Main Road, Sundridge			16 January 1975	TQ4848955393; 51°16′42″N 0°07′39″E		1243926	Upload Photo	Q26536576
135 and 137, Main Road	II	135 and 137, Main Road, Sundridge			16 January 1975	TQ4833555339; 51°16′40″N 0°07′31″E		1243964	Upload Photo	Q26536612
199, Main Road	II	199, Main Road, Sundridge			4 July 1986	TQ4809055331; 51°16′40″N 0°07′19″E		1244196	Upload Photo	Q26536828
201 and 203, Main Road	II	201 and 203, Main Road, Sundridge			16 January 1975	TQ4808255330; 51°16′40″N 0°07′18″E		1243965	Upload Photo	Q26536613
221 and 223, Main Road	II	221 and 223, Main Road, Sundridge			16 January 1975	TQ4796755323; 51°16′40″N 0°07′12″E		1243972	Upload Photo	Q26536620
Bishops Court	II	41-47, Main Road, Sundridge			16 January 1975	TQ4881855450; 51°16′44″N 0°07′56″E		1243927	Upload Photo	Q26536577
Judge's Cottages	II	29-33, Main Road, Sundridge			2 July 1974	TQ4886555464; 51°16′44″N 0°07′59″E		1272643	Upload Photo	Q26562466
Retaining Wall and Terrace in Front of Nos 29-33 Odd	II	Main Road, Sundridge			2 July 1974	TQ4884255462; 51°16′44″N 0°07′58″E		1243962	Upload Photo	Q26536610
Spring Cottage	II	175, Main Road, Sundridge			16 January 1975	TQ4819155329; 51°16′40″N 0°07′24″E		1272644	Upload Photo	Q26562467
The Old Hall	II*	Main Road, Sundridge			10 September 1954	TQ4802555326; 51°16′40″N 0°07′15″E		1243928	Upload Photo	Q17545614
Rustic Stone Bridge in Woods to South East of Brasted Place	II	New Road, Sundridge			10 September 1954	TQ4782254942; 51°16′28″N 0°07′04″E		1272645	Upload Photo	Q26562468
Brook Place Farmhouse	II	Norman Street, Brook Place			4 December 1967	TQ4909752900; 51°15′21″N 0°08′07″E		1272668	Upload Photo	Q26562489
Great Norman Street Farmhouse	II	Norman Street, Great Norman Street Farm			16 January 1975	TQ4867052680; 51°15′14″N 0°07′45″E		1243879	Upload Photo	Q26536532
Little Norman Street Farmhouse	II	Norman Street			10 September 1954	TQ4870652864; 51°15′20″N 0°07′47″E		1243759	Upload Photo	Q26536425
Barn to South West of Oveny Green Farmhouse	II	Ovenden Road, Oveny Green Farm			16 January 1975	TQ4771156808; 51°17′29″N 0°07′01″E		1243754	Upload Photo	Q26536420
Oveny Green Farmhouse	II	Ovenden Road, Oveny Green Farm			16 January 1975	TQ4772256838; 51°17′29″N 0°07′02″E		1243753	Upload Photo	Q26536419
Stable Building to South East of Oveny Green Farmhouse	II	Ovenden Road, Oveny Green Farm			16 January 1975	TQ4774556825; 51°17′29″N 0°07′03″E		1272746	Upload Photo	Q26562561
Shootfield House	II	Pilgrims' Way, Shootfield			10 September 1954	TQ4705157643; 51°17′56″N 0°06′28″E		1243862	Upload Photo	Q26536516
Eastemmost of A Pair of Sphinxes to West of Combe Bank	II	Radnor House Sevenoaks School, Combe Bank Drive, Sundridge, TN14 6AE			25 April 1994	TQ4801555772; 51°16′55″N 0°07′15″E		1272466	Upload Photo	Q26562299
Ice House Adjoining Palm House to South East	II	Radnor House Sevenoaks School, Combe Bank Drive, Sundridge, TN14 6AE			25 April 1994	TQ4817355696; 51°16′52″N 0°07′23″E		1244295	Upload Photo	Q26536924
Northernmost Urn to East of Combe Bank	II	Radnor House Sevenoaks School, Combe Bank Drive, Sundridge, TN14 6AE			25 April 1994	TQ4811855775; 51°16′55″N 0°07′21″E		1272465	Upload Photo	Q26562298
Northernmost Urn to West of Combe Bank	II	Radnor House Sevenoaks School, Combe Bank Drive, Sundridge, TN14 6AE			25 April 1994	TQ4787155702; 51°16′53″N 0°07′08″E		1244284	Upload Photo	Q26536913
Southernmost Urn to East of Combe Bank	II	Radnor House Sevenoaks School, Combe Bank Drive, Sundridge, TN14 6AE			25 April 1994	TQ4812255754; 51°16′54″N 0°07′21″E		1244286	Upload Photo	Q26536915
Southernmost Urn to West of Combe Bank	II	Radnor House Sevenoaks School, Combe Bank Drive, Sundridge, TN14 6AE			25 April 1994	TQ4787155691; 51°16′52″N 0°07′08″E		1244285	Upload Photo	Q26536914
Statue of Lion to West of Combe Bank	II	Radnor House Sevenoaks School, Combe Bank Drive, Sundridge, TN14 6AE			25 April 1994	TQ4801655770; 51°16′55″N 0°07′15″E		1244291	Upload Photo	Q26536920
Urn to South East of Combe Bank	II	Radnor House Sevenoaks School, Combe Bank Drive, Sundridge, TN14 6AE			16 January 1975	TQ4807055727; 51°16′53″N 0°07′18″E		1272638	Upload Photo	Q26562461
Urn to South West of Combe Bank	II	Radnor House Sevenoaks School, Combe Bank Drive, Sundridge, TN14 6AE			16 January 1975	TQ4803355714; 51°16′53″N 0°07′16″E		1244283	Upload Photo	Q26536912
Wellhead Approximately 3 Metres North of Gymnasium	II	Radnor House Sevenoaks School, Combe Bank Drive, Sundridge, TN14 6AE			25 April 1994	TQ4801155815; 51°16′56″N 0°07′15″E		1244287	Upload Photo	Q26536916
Westernmost of A Pair of Sphinxes to West of Combe Bank	II	Radnor House Sevenoaks School, Combe Bank Drive, Sundridge, TN14 6AE			25 April 1994	TQ4801255785; 51°16′55″N 0°07′15″E		1244293	Upload Photo	Q26536922
Aime, Sakers Cottages Forge End, Sakers Cottages Sakers Cottages	II	Sakers Cottages, 2, Church Road, Sundridge			16 January 1975	TQ4847555315; 51°16′40″N 0°07′38″E		1272661	Upload Photo	Q26562482
Wall Along Combe Bank Drive	II	Sundridge			27 July 2001	TQ4828455577; 51°16′48″N 0°07′29″E		1389317	Upload Photo	Q26668756
Yorkshill Farmhouse	II*	Yorkshill			16 January 1975	TQ4986651353; 51°14′30″N 0°08′44″E		1243929	Upload Photo	Q17545619

== See also ==
- Grade I listed buildings in Kent
- Grade II* listed buildings in Kent

== Sources ==
- Newman, John (2012) [1969], Kent: West and the Weald, The Buildings of England, New Haven and London: Yale University Press, ISBN 978-0-300-18509-6
