= Thomas Herne =

English academic

Thomas Herne (died 1722) was an English academic and lay participant in religious controversy.

== Life ==
A native of Suffolk, he was admitted as a pensioner at Corpus Christi College, Cambridge, on 29 October 1711. In the following year he was elected to a scholarship, graduated B.A. in 1715, and was incorporated at Oxford 21 February 1716. Not long afterwards the Duchess of Bedford made him tutor to her sons Wriothesley and John, later successively the third and fourth Dukes of Bedford. In 1716 Herne was elected to a vacant fellowship at Merton College, Oxford, and on 11 October 1718 proceeded M.A. He died a layman and unmarried, at Woburn Abbey, Bedfordshire, in 1722.

== Works ==
Herne took part in the Bangorian controversy, and published under the pseudonym ‘Phileleutherus Cantabrigiensis:’

- ‘The False Notion of a Christian Priesthood,’ &c., in answer to William Law, 1717–18;
- ‘Three Discourses on Private Judgment against the Authority of the Magistrate over Conscience, and Considerations concerning uniting Protestants, translated from Professor Werenfels, with a preface to Dr. Tenison,’ London, 1718, translating Samuel Werenfels;
- ‘An Essay on Imposing and Subscribing Articles of Religion,’ 1719; and
- ‘A Letter to Dr. Mangey, on his Sermon upon Christ's Divinity,’ 1719. To Thomas Mangey.

He also wrote:

- ‘A Letter to the Prolocutor, in Answer to one from him to Dr. Tenison,’ 1718, in support of Edward Tenison;
- ‘A Letter to the Rev. Dr. Tenison concerning Citations out of Archbishop Wake's Preliminary Discourse to the Apostolic Fathers,’ London, 1718;
- ‘A Vindication of the Archbishop of Canterbury from being the author of “A Letter on the State of Religion in England,” printed at Zurich,’ London, 1719; and
- ‘A second Letter to Dr. Mangey,’ by ‘A Seeker after Truth,’ on his sermon on Christ's eternal existence, 1719, under the pseudonym of ‘Philanagnostes Criticus.’

Herne issued in 1719 an account of all the major pamphlets issued in the Bangorian controversy to the end of 1718; a continuation of this account to the end of 1719, London, 1720; and a reissue of the whole, London, 1720.
