= Charles Watson Boise =

American-born British mining engineer

- Born: November 9, 1884; Lakota, North Dakota, United States
- Died: November 15, 1964 (aged 80); Kent, England
- Education: University of North Dakota
- Engineering career
- Discipline: Mining engineering
- Employer: Forminière
- Significant advance: Opening up of diamond fields in Southern Africa

Charles Watson Boise (November 9, 1884 – November 15, 1964) was an American-born naturalised British mining engineer.

== Early life ==
Born in Lakota, North Dakota on November 9, 1884, his family soon moved to Hope where he spent his formative years. Boise attended the University of North Dakota where he developed an interest in literature, publishing Varsity verse: A selection of undergraduate poetry written at the University of North Dakota with P.B. Griffith in 1908. After graduation Boise found work with the Santa Rita Mining Company in New Mexico.

== Mining career ==
He gained employment with Forminière in the Belgian Congo in 1911, directing the exploration, mining and research operations at the company's Kasai diamond fields. He received promotion to Chief Engineer of the company and remained in the region throughout the First World War. Boise led prospecting expeditions in Southern Africa in 1914 and published Diamond fields of German South West Africa in the South African Mining Journal in July 1915 and The Vaal River diggings in Griqualand West in the Mining Magazine in 1916.

After the war Boise established himself in London as a diamond mining consultant. In 1920 he made the first investigation of the diamond fields of the Gold Coast which led to the founding of the Consolidated African Selection Trust. He was also involved with opening the diamond fields in Sierra Leone and the exploration of Northern Rhodesia for copper, which resulted in the creation of the Rhodesian Selection Trust. In 1926 he applied for a British patent (with W. R. Degenhardt) for a machine that could disintegrate clay and mix sand, cement and other materials. He received a patent in the US for the machine in 1929.

Boise retired in 1959.

== Emmetts Garden ==
Boise purchased Emmetts Garden, an Edwardian estate in Kent, in 1927. He was particularly fond of the gardens and built a new rock garden, camelia garden and bluebell dell. His experience with malaria-carrying mosquitos, which thrive in standing water, may have been behind his decision to fill in many of the ponds at Emmetts in the 1930s. He left the gardens to the National Trust after his death.

== Leakey expedition and death ==
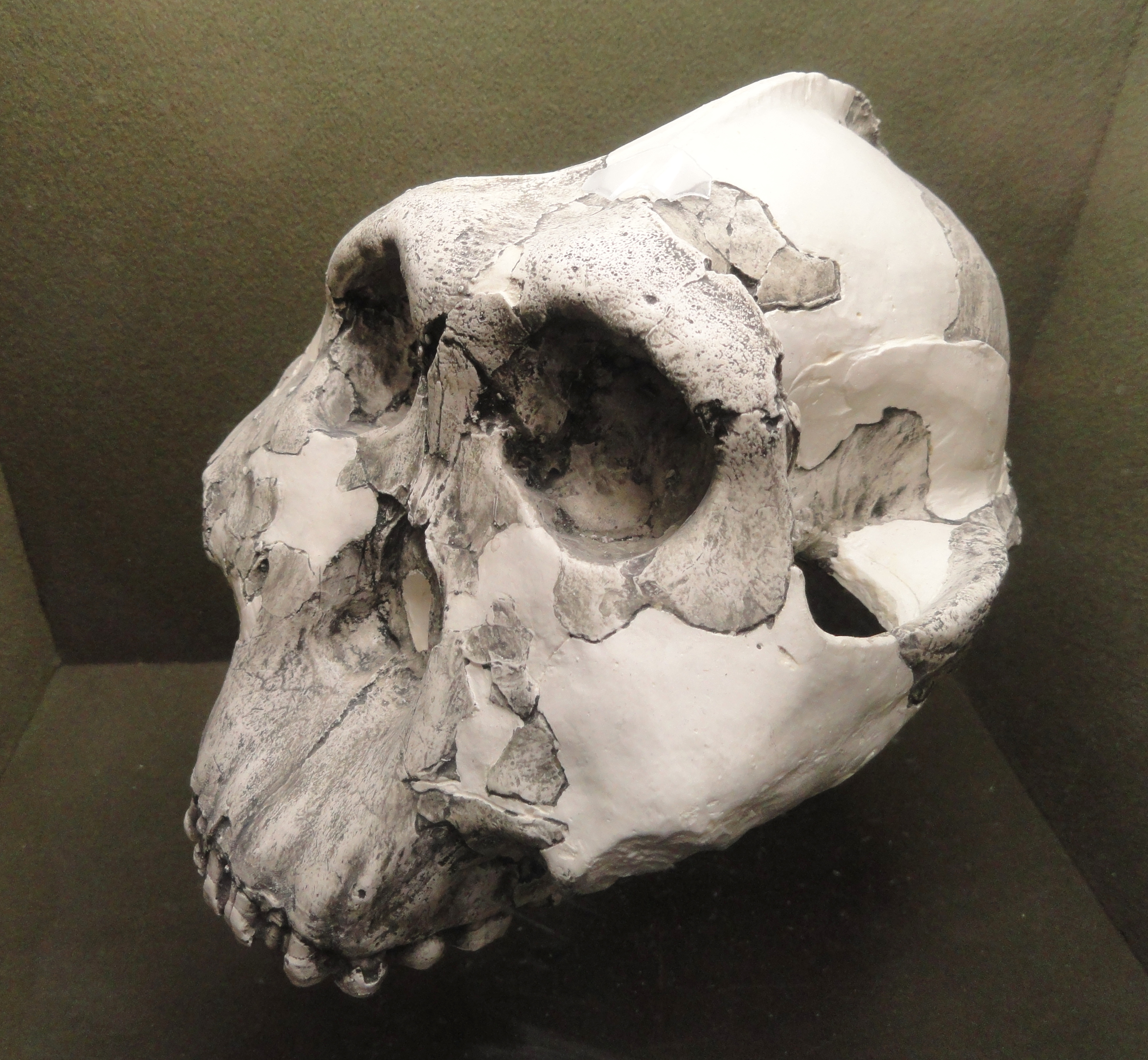
The "Nutcracker Man" skull discovered by Mary Leakey and of a species that was named for Boise

Boise financed an anthropological expedition led by Louis Leakey to Olduvai Gorge, Tanzania in 1959. Leakey's wife, Mary Leakey, discovered a fossil cranium of an unknown species on July 17, 1959. It turned out to be the first known specimen of an early hominin species which she named Zinjanthropus boisei after the expedition's sponsor. The species was later placed in the genus Paranthropus.

Boise died in Kent on November 15, 1964.
