= Radnor House Sevenoaks School =

Co-ed independent school in Kent, England

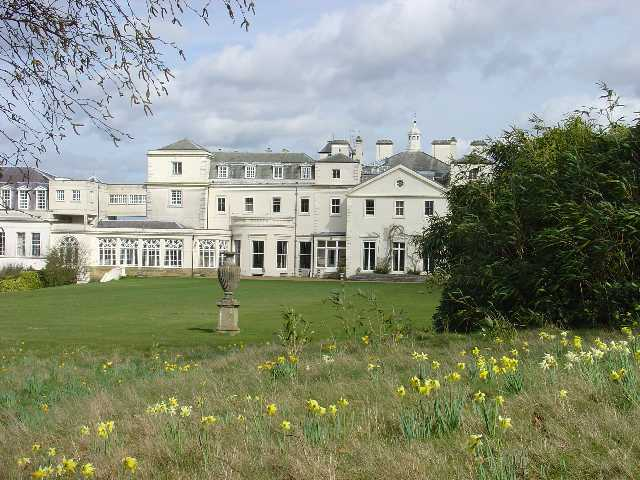

Location
- Combe Bank Drive; Sundridge; Sevenoaks District, Kent, TN14 6AE; England; 51.28171°N 0.12134°E

Information
- Type: Private day school
- Established: 2016 (Radnor House Sevenoaks), 1924 (Combe Bank School)
- Local authority: Kent
- Department for Education URN: 118957 Tables
- Chair of the Governors: C Diggory
- Head: David Paton
- Gender: Coeducational
- Age: 2 to 18
- Enrolment: 510
- Houses: Lullingstone Kites Penshurst Falcons Hever Hawks Eynsford Eagles
- Website: www.radnor-sevenoaks.org

Radnor House Sevenoaks School (formerly Combe Bank School) is a coeducational private day school located in Sundridge (near Sevenoaks) in the English county of Kent.

In 2016, The Radnor House Group officially took over Combe Bank School (a girls-only independent school). The school was re-launched on 1 September 2016 as Radnor House Sevenoaks, a co-educational independent school for boys and girls aged 2–18. It is a member of the ISA and IAPS.

== History ==
The Grade I listed Palladian House by Roger Morris, was built for Col. John Campbell and modelled on the Argyll family seat of Inverary. It became in the early 19th century the boyhood home of Henry, later Cardinal, Manning, and later of William Spottiswoode, the King’s printer. 1907 saw the estate purchased by Ludwig Mond of the British chemical engineering giant ICI. The difficult economic climate of the 1920s saw the 518 acres of the estate sold in seventeen lots, sold in three tranches. For the founding of a convent and school, the House and grounds were purchased by the Society of the Holy Child Jesus. During the World Wars Combe Bank provided convalescence for the wounded, latterly under the British Red Cross and St John of Jerusalem; the school having evacuated first to Torquay and latterly to Coughton Court in Warwickshire. Combe Bank, a convent boarding and day school from the 1920s, was re-founded in 1973 as a private girls' day school.

In the House, the work by Walter Crane of the Arts and Crafts movement in the 1880s can be seen, and that of Walter Cave, President of the Royal Society of British Architects, effecting a design by Adam for a ceiling, again in the 1900s. An extension to the north added the Long Gallery. Wartime needs saw the creation of 9 wards providing 73 recuperation beds. The Order's major extension was completed in 1931 and provided a dining room, hall, and classrooms above. The Order made the Long Gallery their chapel; it is now the sixth form common room. Subsequent developments have included a gym, swimming pool, sports hall, STEM Centre and Performing Arts theatre.

== Curriculum ==
The 2015 ISI report scored the school as ‘Excellent’ (highest grading, equivalent to the Ofsted ‘Outstanding’) for the areas linked to their teaching and learning, achievement, pastoral care and personal development.

This year ( 2026 ) the school got an excellent score by ISI highlighting the school on its student voice
