= Emmetts Garden =

Edwardian house and gardens at Ide Hill, Kent, England

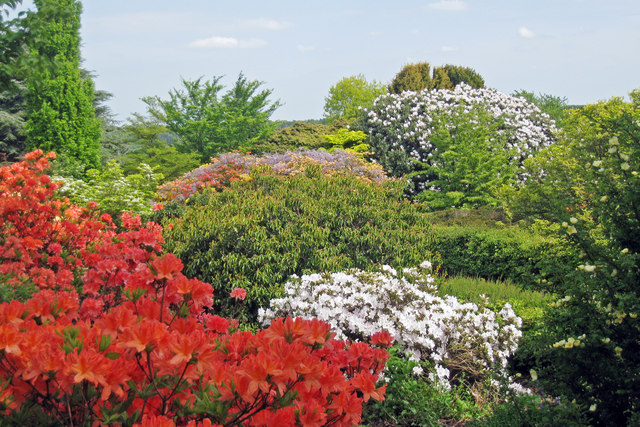
- Interactive map of Emmetts Garden
- Location: Ide Hill, nr Sevenoaks, UK
- Coordinates: 51.2515°N 0.1193°E
- Area: 6 acres (24,000 m^{2})
- Opened: 1965
- Owner: National Trust
- Status: Open All Year except 24–25 December, 7 days per week.
- Collections: Arboretum, exotic shrubs, rose garden, rock garden
- Website: www.nationaltrust.org.uk/emmetts-garden

Emmetts Garden is an Edwardian estate located at Ide Hill, near Sevenoaks in Kent, UK. It is now owned by the National Trust.

== History ==
Emmetts Garden was open farmland until 1860 when the present house was built. The name 'emmett' is a local word for ant and refers to the giant anthills that covered the area until the 1950s. The house and land was purchased in 1890 by Frederic Lubbock, a banker and passionate plantsman. Lubbock's elder brother was John Lubbock, 1st Baron Avebury, a world expert on ants, which may have influenced his decision to purchase the property.

The gardens were initially laid out between 1893 and 1895 under the influence of Lubbock's friend William Robinson in the fashionable Edwardian style popularised by Gertrude Jekyll. The shrub garden was added later in 1900–1908.

After Lubbock's death (1927), the estate was acquired by an American geologist Charles Watson Boise. He made various alterations to both house and garden but retained the original character of the gardens.

In 1964 Charles Boise bequeathed Emmetts to the National Trust. Since then the trust has sought to maintain the botanical diversity of the garden developed by the two men.

Many of the old trees and shrubs planted by Lubbock were brought down in the Great Storm of 1987. Following the storm, which had the benefit of bringing more light to the gardens, the National Trust has undertaken a sympathetic replanting programme.

== Description ==
The garden, which covers an area of about six acres (approximately 2.5 hectares), occupies a commanding site on a 600-foot (180 m) sandstone ridge, overlooking the Weald. One of the highest points in Kent, it offers expansive views towards the North Downs.

It is mainly planted with trees and shrubs in the form of an arboretum; a magnificent 100-foot (30 m) Giant Sequoia (Sequoiadendron giganteum) fortunately survived the Great Storm. There is also a rose garden located next to the Victorian house to which the gardens once belonged. The house is not open to the public.

== See also ==
- List of tourist attractions in Kent
