= Bangorian Controversy =

18th-century theological argument in the Church of England

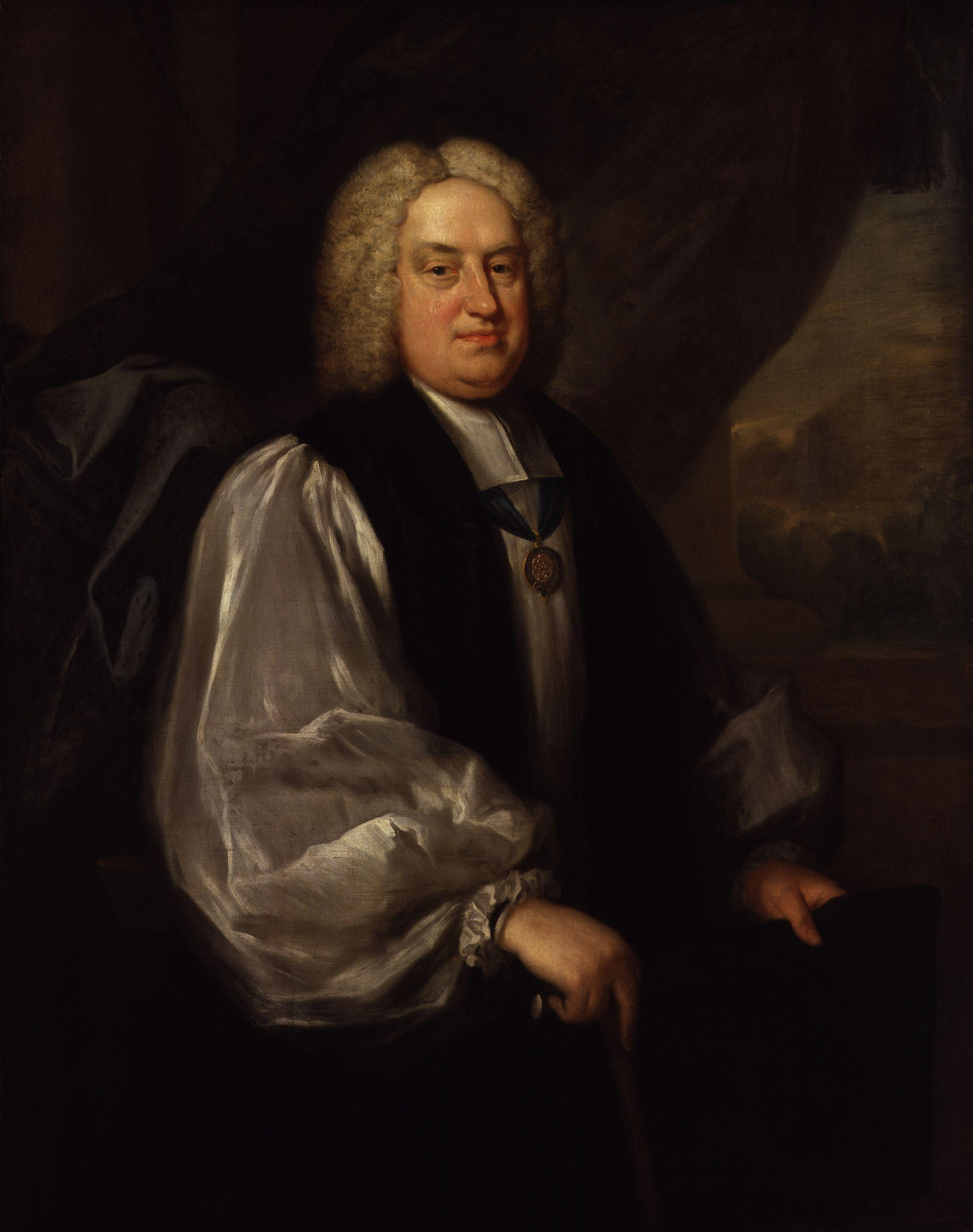
Benjamin Hoadly by Sarah Hoadly

The Bangorian Controversy was a theological controversy within the Church of England in the early 18th century, with strong political overtones. Its origins lay in the 1716 posthumous publication of George Hickes's Constitution of the Catholic Church, and the Nature and Consequences of Schism. In it, Hickes, as Bishop of Thetford, on behalf of the minority non-juror faction that had broken away from the Church of England after the Glorious Revolution, excommunicated all but the non-juror churchmen. Benjamin Hoadly, the Bishop of Bangor, wrote a reply, Preservative against the Principles and Practices of Non-Jurors; his own Erastian position was sincerely proposed as the only test of truth.

The controversy itself began very visibly and vocally when Hoadly delivered a sermon on 31 March (O.S.) 1717 to George I on The Nature of the Kingdom of Christ. His text was John 18:36, "My kingdom is not of this world" and from that, Hoadly deduced, supposedly at the request of the king himself, that there is no biblical justification for any church government of any sort. He identified the church with the Kingdom of Heaven. It was therefore not of this world, and Jesus had not delegated his authority to any representatives.

== Background ==
Two competing visions of government were in play. On the one hand, there was a vision of God appointing the king and the bishops to be leaders, selecting them from all others and imbuing them with special characters, either through grace or in creation. That view held that the king, as the head of the Established Church, was not only a secular leader of a state but also a religious primate. Power and regulation flowed downward from God to the people. That was the aristocratic model that was favoured by the Tory party and had been used to propose the divine right of kings.

The other view was that power flowed up from the people to the leaders, that leaders were no more intrinsically better than those led, and God gives out revelation freely. That Whig view was also the view of the Puritans and the "Independents" (the various Congregational and Baptist churches, Quakers etc.).

George I favoured the Whigs in Parliament and favoured a latitudinarian ecclesiastical policy in general. That was probably not by any desire to give up royal prerogative but to break the power of the aristocracy and the House of Lords. A significant obstacle to all kings of England had been the presence of bishops in the Lords. While a king could create peers, it was much more difficult for him to move bishops into and out of the Lords.

== Sermon and aftermath ==
The sermon was immediately published and instantly drew counterattacks. William Law (Three Letters to the Bishop of Bangor) and Thomas Sherlock (dean of Chichester), in particular, gave vigorous defences of church polity. Hoadly himself wrote A Reply to the Representations of Convocation to answer Sherlock, Andrew Snape, provost of Eton, and Francis Hare, then dean of Worcester. The three men, and another opponent, Robert Moss, dean of Ely, were deprived of their royal chaplaincies by the king. Hoadly did not, however, attempt to answer William Law. It has been claimed that in all, over 200 pamphlets linked to the controversy were published by 53 writers. Of those, 74 were published in July 1717.

In May 1717, the Convocation appointed a committee to study the sermon. When the report was ready for synodal sanction against Hoadly, the king dismissed the convocation, which did not meet again for over 130 years.

== Timeline of publications ==
| Year | Author | Publication | Position | Replies |
|---|---|---|---|---|
| 1716 | George Hickes (died 1715), posthumously published by Thomas Deacon | The Constitution of the Catholick Church and the Nature and Consequences of Schism | Non-juror | Benjamin Hoadly, A Preservative against the Principles and Practices of the Nonjurors both in Church and State, 1716. |
| 1717 | Andrew Snape | Letters to the Bishop of Bangor | High Church | |
| 1717 | Thomas Sherlock | Remarks on the Bishop of Bangor's Treatment of the Clergy and Convocation and other works | High Church | |
| 1717 | William Law | Three Letters to the Bishop of Bangor, from 1717 | Non-juror of the Hanoverian succession | |
| 1718 | Robert Moss | The Report Vindicated from Misreports | High Church | |
| 1718 | Thomas Herne | A letter to the Reverend Dr. Edward Tenison, concerning some citations made from ... the Arch-Bishop of Canterbury's preliminary discourse to the Apostolical fathers, in a paper lately published, intituled, A letter to the Reverend the Prolocutor: being an answer to a paper, &c. By the author of that letter | Supporter of Hoadley and Tenison | |
| 1719 | Francis Hare | Church Authority Vindicated | High Church | Hoadly, An Answer to Dr. Hare's Sermon, intituled "Church Authority vindicated," 1720. |

== See also ==
- 1716 in literature
- 1717 in literature
- 1718 in literature
