= Franks Hall =

Elizabethan country house completed in 1591

Coordinates: 51°23′17″N 0°14′01″E

Franks Hall in Horton Kirby, Kent, (grid reference TQ 555 677) is a large Elizabethan country house, completed in 1591. The Grade I listed building remains a private house.

== History ==
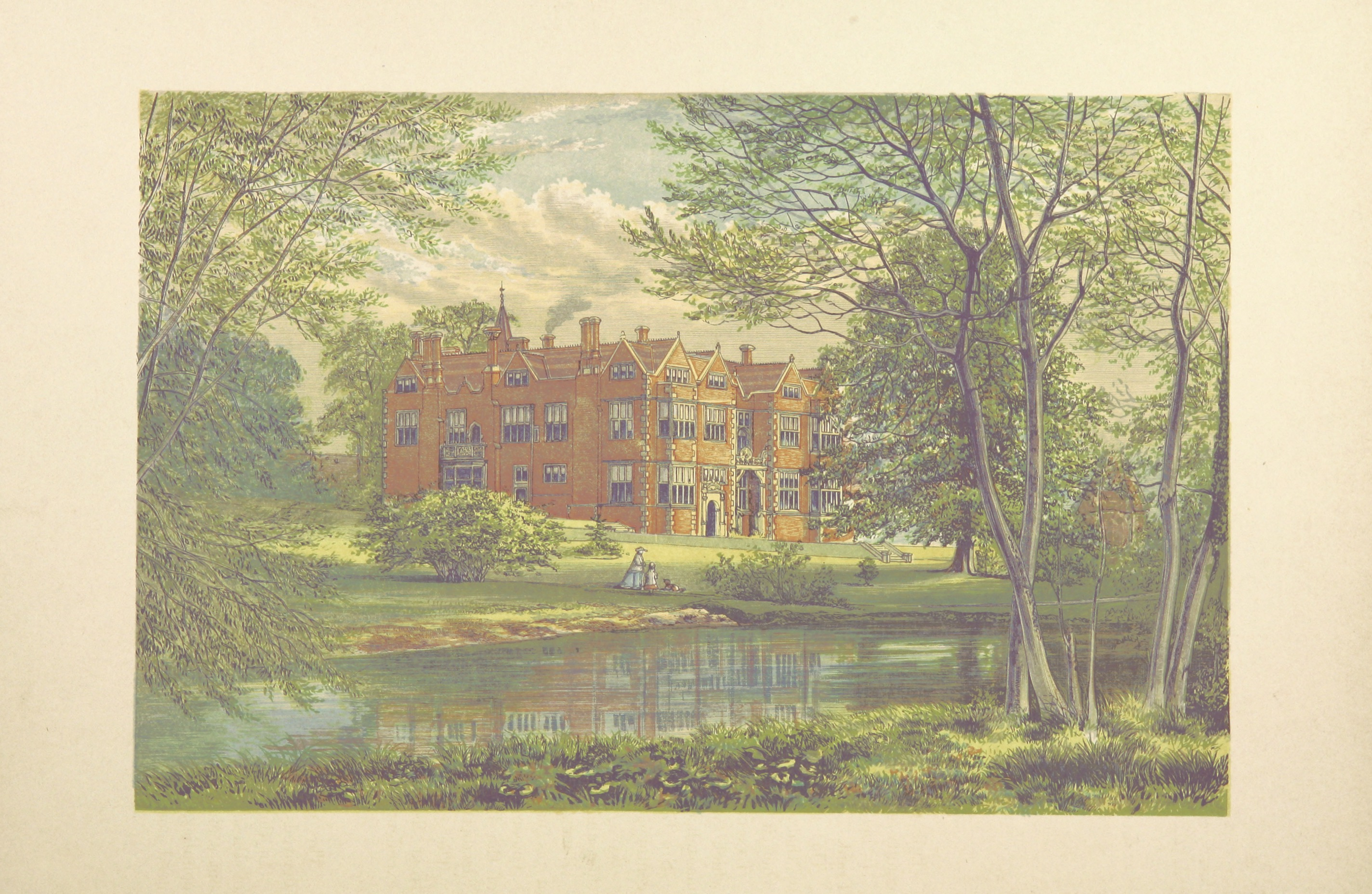
Franks Hall pictured in Francis Orpen Morris's County Seats of the Noblemen and Gentlemen of Great Britain and Ireland (1867)

A former manor house had been built on the opposite bank of the River Darent in 1220 by the Frankish family. When the Frankish family died out in the fifteenth century the property passed to the Martin family. The house was inherited by Lancelot Bathurst in the reign of Elizabeth I. Bathurst built the surviving building on a new site in 1591. Bathurst died in 1594, and the house passed to his son Randolph and then to his son Sir Edward Bathurst. The house passed to Sir Thomas Bathurst and on his death in 1688 passed to his son Francis Bathurst and then on the death of Francis in 1738 to his daughter Beronice. She died in 1748 and the house was left to her daughter Susan, and via her to her husband John Tasker, a solicitor from Dartford. The Taskers had no children.

After Susan died, Tasker remarried and lived in Franks Hall until his death in 1796. The house passed to his wife, who lived in it until her death in 1814. At this date, the house passed to Tasker's niece, a Yorkshirewoman who took little interest in the property. In the 1850s, Franks Hall was sold to a farmer by the name of Nicholas Ray. Under Ray's ownership, the building was used as a barn, and it soon began to decay. Ray died in 1860 and in 1861 Robert Bradford became the owner. Bradford had the house rebuilt, and changed internally. In 1877, Franks Hall was put up for auction. It was withdrawn at £65,000 as the reserve of £75,000 had not been met. It was later sold by private treaty for £70,000 to Frederick Power. The estate at this time was 446 acres (180 ha) in extent.

In 1883, the property was sold to Vavasour Earle. He built a picture gallery at the end of the lime avenue. This building was largely destroyed by incendiary bombs during the Second World War and only the walls remain now. Earle emigrated to United States in 1910, and the house was bought by Lord Bathurst, thus returning to the family 153 years after it was lost to the Bathursts. Lord Bathurst gave Franks Hall to his son Lord Apsley in 1923 as a wedding present. The Apsleys only lived in Franks Hall for a few months and it then stood empty for about ten years. It was sold to Morris Wheeler, a wealthy draper and property owner from Bexley. During the Second World War, Franks Hall was used as a maternity home. Wheeler died in 1962 and his widow lived in the house until her death in 1977.

The house was purchased by Michael Berry, who lived in it until 1980 when it was sold to Findlay Publications Ltd who restored it for use as their headquarters. The estate by this time had been reduced to 88 acres (36 ha) in extent. The stable block was also purchased and converted to offices. The house has since been sold and has reverted to a private residence.
