= Sundridge, Kent =

Village in Kent, England

Sundridge
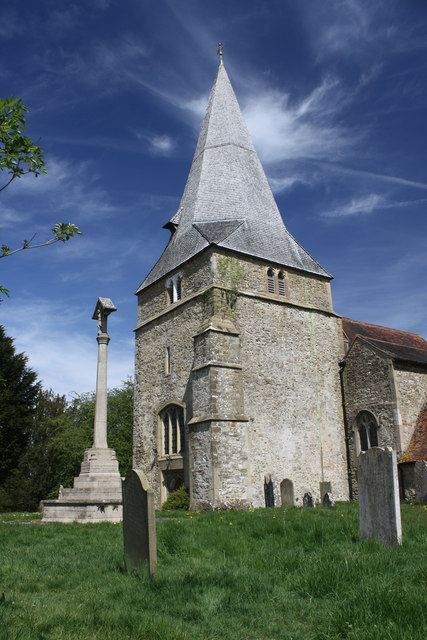
- St Mary's Church, Sundridge

- Location within Kent
- Civil parish: Sundridge with Ide Hill
- District: Sevenoaks
- Shire county: Kent
- Region: South East
- Country: England
- Sovereign state: United Kingdom
- Post town: SEVENOAKS
- Postcode district: TN14
- Police: Kent
- Fire: Kent
- Ambulance: South East Coast
- UK Parliament: Sevenoaks

Sundridge is a village within the civil parish of Sundridge with Ide Hill, in the Sevenoaks district of Kent, England. The village is located on the A25 road to the east of Westerham. It lies within the Kent Downs Area of Outstanding Natural Beauty and within London’s Metropolitan Green Belt. It is approximately 21 miles south of London. Its church is Anglican and dedicated to St Mary.

== History ==
Sundridge appears in the Domesday Book of 1086 as Sondresse, held by the Archdiocese of Canterbury. King Henry III granted the manor to Sir Ralph de Fremingham in the 1340s: it remained in the Fremingham and Isley family until the 17th century. The manor was then sold to the Hyde family.

The Parish Church of St Mary dates from the 12th century and is Grade I listed. It was restored in the 19th century and further repaired after a fire in 1882.

Radnor House, previously known as Combe Bank, is a Grade I listed Palladian mansion dating from 1728; it was designed by Roger Morris and built for Colonel John Campbell, later Duke of Argyll. It was later the home of the banker Sir William Manning MP, whose son Cardinal Henry Manning grew up there. Radnor House remained a private home until the 1920s, and then became a convent, an independent school and a wedding venue.

== Notable residents ==
- Beilby Porteus (1731–1809), Bishop of London and leading abolitionist, who spent several weeks in the autumn of each year at his small country home at Bishop's Court, Sundridge. He died at Fulham Palace and was buried at St. Mary's Church, where his tomb lies in the churchyard.
- Anne Seymour Damer (1748–1828), the daughter of Field Marshal Henry Seymour Conway and Caroline Conway, who would become a noted sculptor and the owner of Horace Walpole's famous estate, Strawberry Hill.
- Christopher Wordsworth (1807–1885), the youngest brother of the famous poet William Wordsworth. Christopher would later become Bishop of Lincoln.
- William Spottiswoode (1825-1883), President of the Royal Society, lived at Combe Bank
- Ludwig Mond (1839-1909), industrial scientist, lived at Combe Bank
- Rt Hon Michael Fallon, MP (born 1952), Secretary of State for Defence, 2014–2017.

== Sundridge Aerodrome ==
Around 1910 an aerodrome with a three-bay timber-framed corrugated-iron clad hangar was opened north of Chevening Road, 51°16′55″N 0°07′40″E, by Russian Prince Serge de Bolotoff, a sales representative for Albatros Flugzeugwerke, Berlin, who had gained experience of aircraft design at the Voisin works, Billancourt, France and at Brooklands in Surrey. He set up a small aircraft factory at Sundridge Aerodrome shortly before World War One in the three-bay hangar. A two-seat De Bolotoff SDEB 14 biplane was built there and registered to the de Bolotoff Company in August 1919. Around 1927 the factory building became a bus depot, but during World War II it reverted to military use with the Royal Air Force, providing storage and salvage facilities for crash-damaged aircraft. The aerodrome closed in 1945 but the hangar survives today in commercial use; it is believed to be the oldest aircraft hangar in the country and was designated as a Grade II listed building in 1988.

== See also ==
- Radnor House Sevenoaks School
