= Bessels Green =

Area of Sevenoaks, Kent, England

Coordinates: 51.279°N 00.156°E

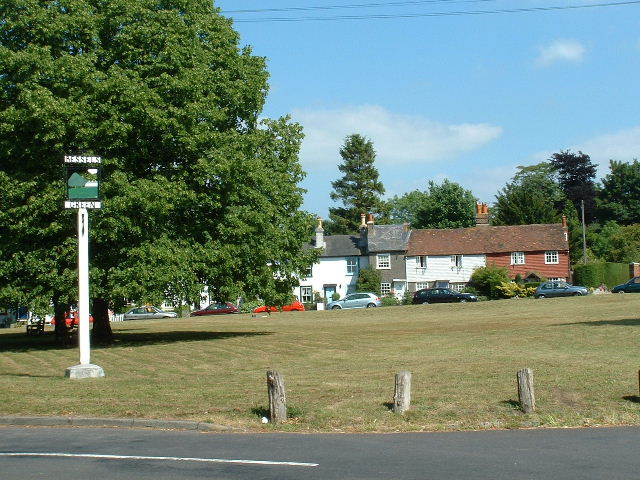
- Part of the village green, 2005

- Location within Kent
- OS grid reference: TQ5055
- Civil parish: Chevening
- District: Sevenoaks
- Shire county: Kent
- Region: South East
- Country: England
- Sovereign state: United Kingdom
- Post town: Sevenoaks
- Postcode district: TN14
- Police: Kent
- Fire: Kent
- Ambulance: South East Coast
- UK Parliament: Sevenoaks
- Website: www.cheveningparishcouncil.gov.uk

Bessels Green is a village now incorporated into the built-up area of Sevenoaks in Kent, England. It is on the north-western outskirts of Sevenoaks, in the parish of Chevening. A busy trunk route, the A25, runs through the centre of the village.

Bessels Green has a village green and a public house, the King's Head. There are two churches: the Bessels Green Unitarian Meeting House (built 1716) and the Bessels Green Baptist Church (c. 1771). Three primary schools are nearby: Chevening C.E.P. Primary school, Riverhead Infants School and Amherst Junior School.
