= St Mary's Church, Sundridge =

Church of St Mary
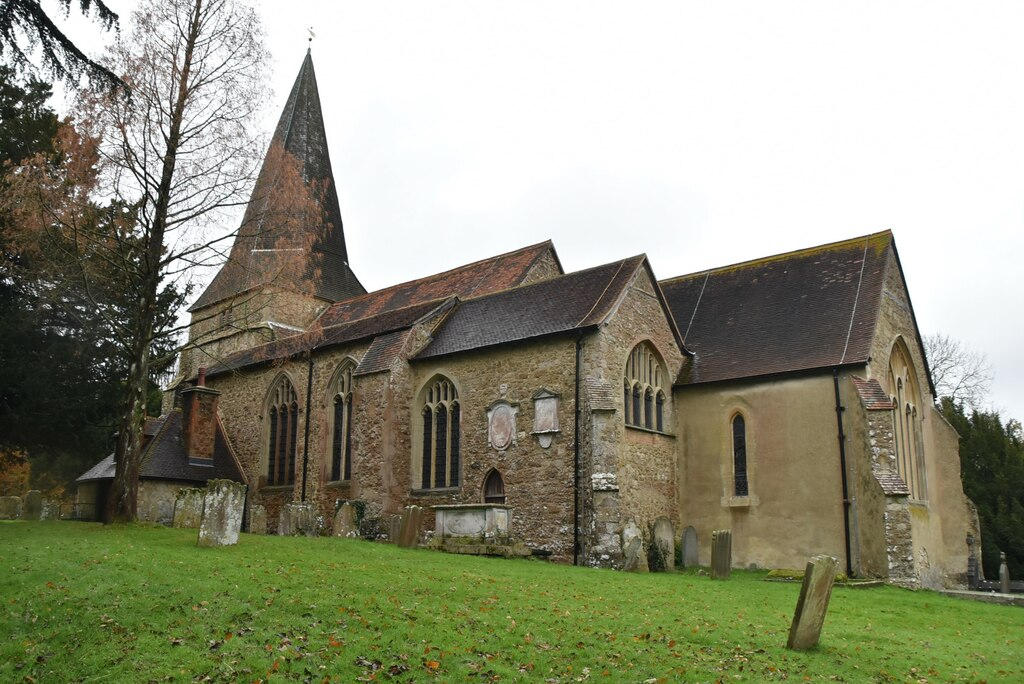
- Church of St Mary
- 51°16′27.480″N 0°7′45.232″E
- OS grid reference: TQ 48618 54950
- Country: England
- Denomination: Church of England
- Website: lifedrawingbromley.co.uk

Architecture
- Heritage designation: Grade I listed
- Designated: 10 September 1954

Administration
- Diocese: Rochester

St Mary's Church is an Anglican church in Sundridge, Kent, England, and in the Diocese of Rochester. It is Grade I listed. The building, originally of the 12th century, was enlarged in the 13th and 15th centuries, and restored in the 19th century.

== History and description ==
Sundridge was mentioned in the Domesday Book of 1086: the land was held by the Archbishop of Canterbury, and there was a church. It was probably built of timber, being replaced by a two-cell church in the 12th century.

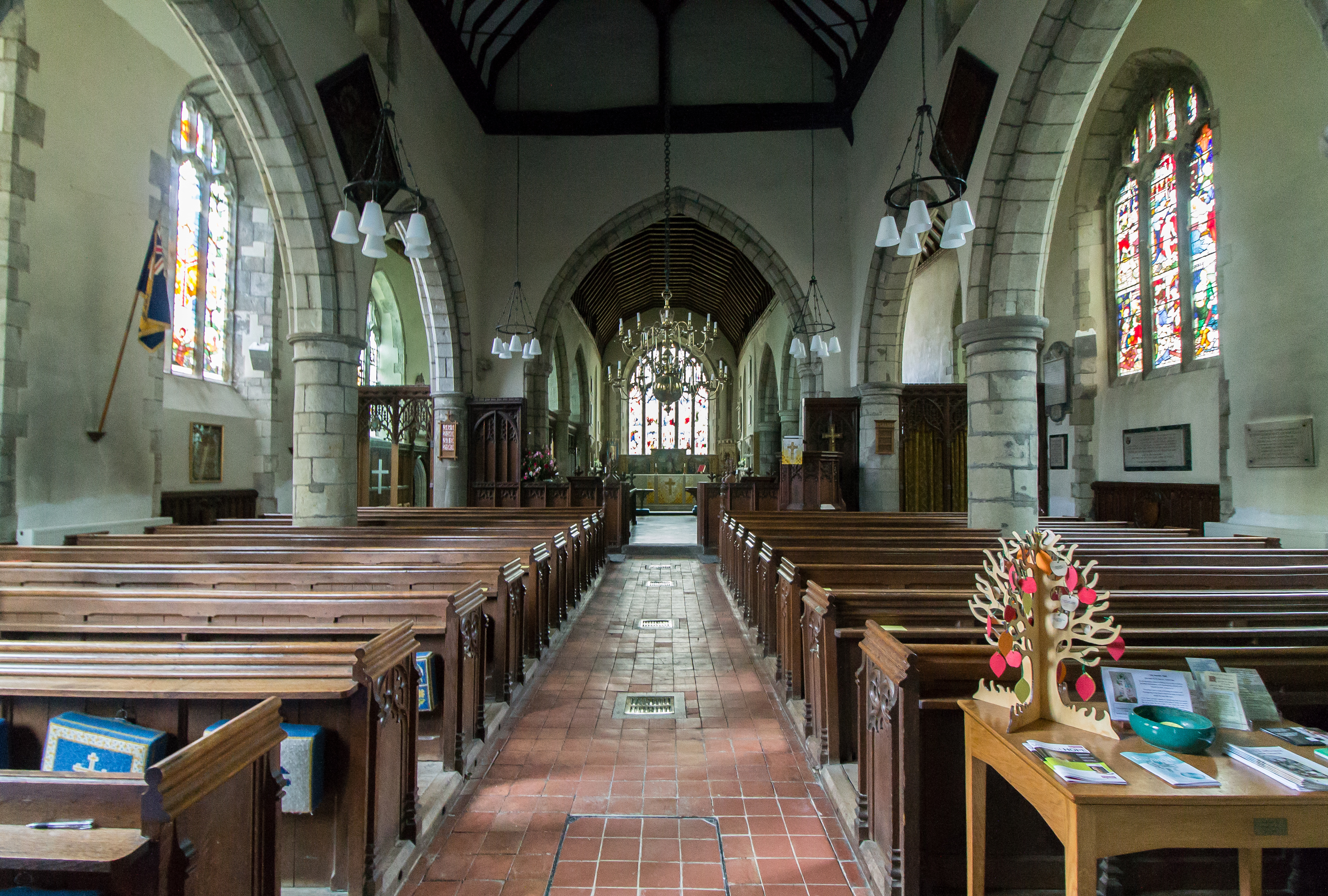
Looking towards the chancel

It was enlarged in the 13th century, perhaps because of its location near Pilgrim's Way. North and south aisles were added, and chapels north and south of the chancel, and probably also the tower.

The aisles were heightened in the 15th century, resulting in tall, narrow aisles, with the earlier clerestory windows above the arcades becoming internal features. The chancel chapels were also heightened, and the chancel arch was rebuilt. The aisles and chapels each have separate pitched roofs. The tower was modified with the addition of buttresses, the stair turret, west door and west window. It has a shingled spire.

The chancel was remodelled about 1808 by J. Carter, the work funded by Lord Frederick Campbell. There was restoration by G. E. Street in 1848–1849. After a fire in 1882, the chancel was repaired and its roof was rebuilt. There was further restoration to the church in the early 20th century by W. D. Caröe.

=== Interior ===
There is a brass chandelier dated 1726, given by Edward Tenison, at one time Rector of Sundridge. The timber pulpit and choir stalls are of the late 19th century. The carved reredos, of Caen stone, dates from 1877. There is stained glass of the late 19th and early 20th century, including in the south aisle a depiction of the Annunciation by Charles Eamer Kempe.

There is a brass of Roger Isley (died 1429), lord of the manor of Sundridge, and a brass of Thomas Isley (died 1518), lord of the manor, and his wife with their ten sons and three daughters. There are marble busts of Elizabeth Campbell, Duchess of Argyll and Lady Caroline Conway, by Anne Damer, daughter of Caroline. Anne Damer was buried at the church.
