= Thomas Mangey =

English clergyman and scholar (1688 – 1755)

Thomas Mangey (1688 – 6 March 1755) was an English clergyman and scholar, known for his edition of Philo.

== Life ==
He was son of Arthur Mangey, a goldsmith of Leeds, and was educated at the Leeds free school. He was admitted as sub-sizar to St. John's College, Cambridge, 28 June 1704, at the age of sixteen. He graduated B.A. in 1707 and M.A. in 1711, and was admitted a fellow of St. John's 5 April 1715. In 1716 he is described on the title-page of one of his sermons as chaplain at Whitehall.

In 1718 he resigned his fellowship. In 1719 or earlier he was chaplain to the Bishop of London, John Robinson . In 1719 he also proceeded LL.D., and in July 1725 D.D., being one of the seven who then received their doctorate at the hands of Richard Bentley. As deputy to William Lupton, preacher of Lincoln's Inn (who died in December 1726), he delivered a series of discourses on the Lord's Prayer, of which a second edition appeared in 1717.

From 1717 to 1720 he was the Rector of St. Nicolas' Church, Guildford, and subsequently the vicarage of Ealing, Middlesex, which he resigned in 1754, and the rectory of St. Mildred's, Bread Street, which he retained till his death. In May 1721 he was presented to the fifth stall in Durham Cathedral, and promoted from that to the first in January 1722. Mangey died at Durham, 6 March 1755, and was buried in the east transept of the cathedral.

== Works ==
His major work was his edition of Philo of Alexandria (Philo Judaeus), Philonis Judaei Opera . . . typis Gulielmi Bowyer, 2 vols. London, 1742. He also made collations of the text of the Greek Testament, and critical notes and adversaria on Diodorus Siculus and other classical authors.

His other printed works are mainly sermons, and polemical treatises against John Toland and William Whiston. One volume of collected sermons by him was published in 1732. His 'Remarks upon "Nazarenus," wherein the Falsity of Mr. Toland's Mahometan Gospel. &c., are set forth,' 1719, called forth more than one answer. Toland replied to it the year after in his Tetradymus. Another of his treatises, Plain Notions of our Lord's Divinity, also published in 1719, was answered the same year by 'Phileleutherus Cantabrigiensis,' i.e. Thomas Herne.

== Family ==
He married Dorothy, daughter of John Sharpe, archbishop of York, by whom he left a son, John, afterwards vicar of Dunmow, Essex, and prebendary of St. Paul's, who died in 1782. His widow survived him till 1780.
