= Robert Amadas =

British goldsmith (1490–1532)

- Born: Before 1490
- Died: 7 April 1532
- Occupations: Goldsmith, master of the jewel house, deputy master of the mint
- Spouse: Elizabeth Bryce
- Children: Elizabeth Amadas; Thomasine Amadas
- Parent: William Amadas

Robert Amadas (before 1490 – 7 April 1532) was a London Goldsmith whose clients included King Henry VIII and his courtiers. He was Master of the King's Jewel House, and one of the Deputy Masters of the Mint.

== Family ==
Robert Amadas was the son of William Amadas, a London Goldsmith. His father's will, made in 1491, names his sons Robert, John, Thomas and William. Robert Amadas is also mentioned in the will, proved in 1490, of his uncle, John Amadas, also a London goldsmith.

== Career ==
Amadas was trained as a goldsmith by his father. He was a lowys of the Goldsmiths' Company in 1492, and 'fully sworn to the Company in 1494'. In 1503 he was admitted to the livery. He was one of the Company's Wardens in 1511 and 1515, and Prime Warden in 1524 and again in 1530. The last mention of him in the Company's records was on 15 January 1532 when his apprentice, Brian Berwycke, was sworn to the Company.

Amadas is said to have been the 'chief supplier of gold and silver to the King and his courtiers'; numerous entries in the State Papers record payment to him for gold and silver plate, including plate given by the King as New Year's gifts. In January 1532 the King's New Year's gift to Amadas was 36.75 ounces of plate, while Amadas in turn gave the King 'six sovereigns in a white paper'. It has been conjectured that Amadas marked his work as a goldsmith with a heart, a play on his name.

Robert Adamas, John Twistleton, and William Holland probably supplied the numerous gifts which Henry VIII gave to Francis I of France at the Field of the Cloth of Gold in 1520. Amadas served as acting Master of the King's Jewel House as early as 1524, and on 20 April 1526 was formally appointed Master, an office which he retained until his death in April 1532, when he was succeeded by Thomas Cromwell. After Amadas' death, commissioners appointed to take an inventory of the King's jewels which had been in Amadas' custody. Two of the three books of inventory were signed by the King, and all three by Amadas' widow, Elizabeth.

At some time before 1526 Amadas was appointed one of the deputies to the Master of the Mint, William Blount, 4th Baron Mountjoy. In 1526 the coinage was altered, and a new contract was entered into between Mountjoy and his two deputies, Robert Amadas and Ralph Rowlett, and Amadas' deputy, Martin Bowes. Shortly thereafter allegations were made of wrongdoing in the administration of the Mint, and in June 1527 a commission of inquiry was set up. The commission reported in February 1528, and was highly critical of Amadas and Rowlett. In 1530 Lord Mountjoy, disturbed by the declining revenues from the Mint, and suspecting corruption, instituted a lawsuit in the High Court of Chancery against his two deputies. Unfortunately the outcome of the lawsuit is unknown; however in December 1530 Mountjoy appointed a new deputy for the Mint, the London goldsmith Hugh Welshe or Walshe, who had been one of the members of the commission which had earlier been critical of the work of Amadas and Rowlett.

Amadas refused election as Sheriff of London in 1531. He made his will on 3 July 1531, requesting burial in his parish church of St Mary Woolnoth, and appointing his wife, Elizabeth, as his sole executrix, and Thomas Howard, 3rd Duke of Norfolk, Sir Thomas More, and Richard Rich as overseers. He bequeathed the King a gold cup of £100 value. Among his other bequests was £5 to John Freeman, who had been apprenticed to him in 1507 and admitted to the livery in 1528. The will was proved 28 November 1533. His stock was inventoried after his death, and put up for sale.

In July 1533, an Elizabeth Amadas claimed that she had earlier been solicited to become Henry VIII's mistress. She predicted that Anne Boleyn would be burned as a harlot, and said that men should not be able to set aside their wives, as the King was attempting to do with Catherine of Aragon. Elizabeth Amadas claimed that her own husband had left her. She was arrested for her treasonous comments, and it is said that Robert Amadas was ordered to pay several hundred pounds for 'missing plate' owned by the King.

However Virgoe and others consider this identification to be mistaken, and conclude that the Elizabeth Amadas who made these allegations was likely Elizabeth (née Buttockshide) Amadas, the daughter of Anthony Buttockshide of St Budeaux, Devon, and wife of John Amadas (c.1489–1554/5), sergeant-at-arms to Henry VIII:

Cromwell seems to have treated [John Amadas] circumspectly, perhaps because the Mistress Amadas who prophesied against the King and Anne Boleyn and predicted a Parliament of Peace to be held in the Tower may have been his first wife...Elton's identification of the prophetess of 1533 with Elizabeth, widow of Robert Amadas, is unacceptable as she married Sir Thomas Neville soon after the goldsmith's death in 1532.

== Marriage and issue ==
Amadas married Elizabeth Bryce, the daughter of James Bryce (d. before 1496) by his wife, Elizabeth Chester (d.1504), and the granddaughter of Sir Hugh Bryce (d. 22 November 1496), Goldsmith, and Lord Mayor of London in 1485, and his wife, Elizabeth (née Ranfield), by whom he had two daughters, Elizabeth and Thomasine:

- Elizabeth Amadas married Richard Scrope (d. December 1572) of Castle Combe, Wiltshire, and is said to have left as her sole heir a daughter, Frances Scrope, who married Martin Bowes (d.1573), son of Sir Martin Bowes (d.1566) who had been her grandfather's deputy at the Mint. According to the Diary of Henry Machyn, she was buried 29 December 1566. Martin Bowes (d.1573) married secondly, Frances Clopton (d.1619), the daughter of Richard Clopton and Thomasine Knyvet. After his death, Frances (née Clopton) married secondly, as his third wife, Matthew Hutton, Archbishop of York.
- Thomasine Amadas was the first wife of Sir Richard Stapleton (d. 11 January 1585) of Burton Joyce, Nottinghamshire, by whom she had a son, Brian Stapleton (d. 13 December 1606), who married firstly Eleanor Neville, daughter of Ralph Neville, 4th Earl of Westmorland, and secondly Elizabeth Darcy, the daughter of George Darcy, 2nd Baron Darcy de Darcy.

After Amadas' death, his widow, Elizabeth, married, on 28 August 1532, as his second wife, the lawyer and Speaker of the House of Commons, Sir Thomas Neville, (d. 29 May 1542), fifth son of George Neville, 2nd Baron Bergavenny (1436–1492), by his first wife Margaret, daughter of Hugh Fenn. Neville had earlier been married to Katherine (née Dacre), widow of George, 8th Baron FitzHugh (d. 28 January 1513), and daughter of Humphrey Dacre, 1st Baron Dacre of Gilsland, by whom he had an only child, Margaret Neville, who on 1 May 1536 married Sir Robert Southwell. Elizabeth predeceased her second husband.
