= Thomas Nevill =

English politician (died 1542)

Sir Thomas Neville
- Born: in or before 1484
- Died: 29 May 1542
- Buried: Mereworth, Kent
- Spouses: Katherine Dacre; Elizabeth Bryce
- Issue: Margaret Neville
- Father: George Neville, 4th Baron Bergavenny
- Mother: Margaret Fenn

Sir Thomas Neville or Nevill (in or before 1484 – 29 May 1542) was a younger son of George Neville, 4th Baron Bergavenny. He was a prominent lawyer and a trusted councillor of King Henry VIII, and was elected Speaker of the House of Commons in 1515.

== Family ==
Neville was the fifth son of George Neville, 4th Baron Bergavenny (1436–1492), by his first wife, Margaret Fenn (d. 28 September 1485), the daughter and heir of Hugh Fenne.

== Career ==
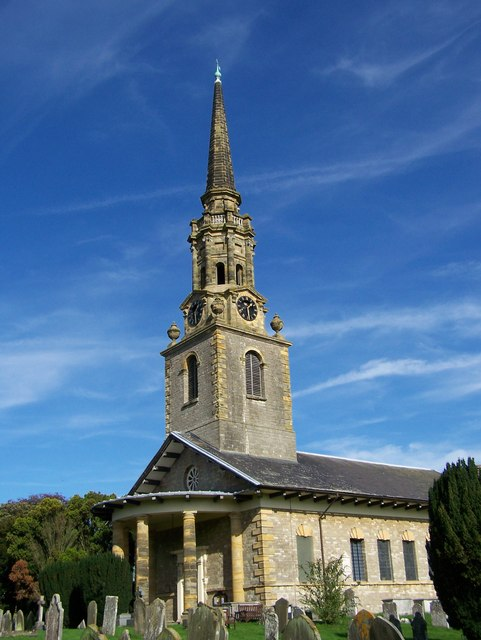
Mereworth church, where Sir Thomas Neville is buried

Although there is no formal record of his legal education, Neville was a member of Gray's Inn, and by 1514 had begun to oversee the legal process by which tenants in chief of the Crown sued out their liveries to obtain possession of their estates. In 1529 he was appointed to supervise the suing out of all liveries involving lands in England, Wales and Calais. Between the years 1516 and 1527 he was also in frequent attendance at meetings of King Henry VIII's council, and was active in both Star Chamber and the Court of Requests. It is said that by 1522, of the Masters of Requests only he and Sir Thomas More had access to the King.

Details of Neville's early Parliamentary career are unclear, although it is likely he represented a constituency in Kent. On 8 February 1515, he was chosen Speaker of the House of Commons, and knighted by Henry VIII in the presence of both houses, 'a mark of distinction thought to be without precedent'. After his term as Speaker, he appears to have left Parliament, but continued to serve at court, where he had livery in Henry VIII's household in 1519. He was a signatory to at least two treaties, and was present at both the Field of Cloth of Gold and Henry VIII's meeting with Emperor Charles V. He is recorded as having received a New Year's gift from the King in 1533, and was among the courtiers present when Anne of Cleves was welcomed at Dover.

In 1521 his eldest brother, George Neville, 5th Baron Bergavenny, was disgraced, and was compelled to sell his principal manor of Birling in Kent to the Crown. In 1538 another of his brothers, Sir Edward Neville, was executed. However the misfortunes which befell his brothers appear to have had no effect on Neville's own career.

In 1535, he was involved in unsuccessful negotiations to marry his only child, Margaret, to Gregory Cromwell, the son of Henry VIII's chief minister, Thomas Cromwell. Thomas Cromwell is said to have chosen Margaret's eventual husband, Sir Robert Southwell.

Although he did not acquire extensive lands, Neville was wealthy enough to lend money to other courtiers, including the King's brother-in-law, Charles Brandon, 1st Duke of Suffolk, and Henry Percy, 5th Earl of Northumberland.

Neville made his will on 23 May 1542, appointing as executors his cousin, Sir Thomas Willoughby, Chief Justice of the Common Pleas, and Sir John Baker. He died six days later, and was buried in Mereworth church in Kent, where he is commemorated by a memorial brass.

== Marriages and issue ==
Neville married firstly Katherine (née Dacre), widow of George FitzHugh, 7th Baron FitzHugh, d. 28 January 1513, and daughter of Humphrey Dacre, 1st Baron Dacre of Gilsland and Mabel Parr, the daughter of Sir Thomas Parr, d. 24 November 1464, by whom he had an only child, Margaret Neville, who on 1 May 1536 married Sir Robert Southwell. After the death of Sir Robert Southwell, Margaret married William Plumbe. She died 25 December 1575, and was buried in the Church of St Giles at Wyddial, Hertfordshire, where there is a memorial brass commemorating her.

Neville married secondly Elizabeth (née Bryce), widow of Robert Amadas (d. 7 April 1532), a London goldsmith and Master of Henry VIII's Jewel House, who predeceased him, and by whom he left no issue.

== Notes ==
Political offices
Preceded by Robert Sheffield	Speaker of the House of Commons; 1515	Succeeded by Thomas More
