= Elizabeth Brice =

Elizabeth Brice may refer to:

- Elizabeth Brice, later Elizabeth Amadas (died 1532), lady at the royal court of King Henry VIII of England
- Elizabeth Brice (1957–2011), cannabis activist who wrote as Clare Hodges
- Elizabeth Brice (performer) (1883–1965), American musical-comedy singer and dancer
- Liz May Brice (born 1975), English actress
