= George Nevill, 5th Baron Bergavenny =

English courtier (1469–1535)

The Right Honourable The Lord Bergavenny KG PC
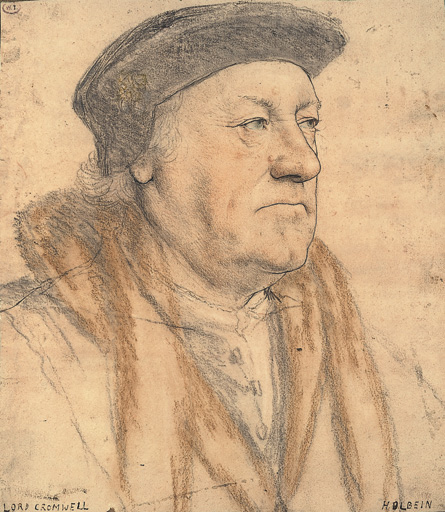
- George Nevill, 5th Baron Bergavenny, by Hans Holbein the Younger (collection of the Earls of Pembroke)

Lord Warden of the Cinque Ports
- In office 1534–1534
- Preceded by: Sir Edward Poyning
- Succeeded by: Sir Edward Guilford

Personal details
- Born: c.1469
- Died: June 1535 (about 66)
- Resting place: Birling, Kent
- Spouse(s): Joan FitzAlan; Margaret Brent; Mary Stafford; Mary Brooke
- Children: Henry Nevill, 6th Baron Bergavenny; John Nevill; Thomas Nevill; Elizabeth Nevill; Jane Nevill; Mary Nevill; Katherine Nevill; Margaret Nevill; Dorothy Nevill; Ursula Nevill daughter whose name is unknown
- Parents: George Nevill, 4th Baron Bergavenny (father); Margaret Fenn (mother)

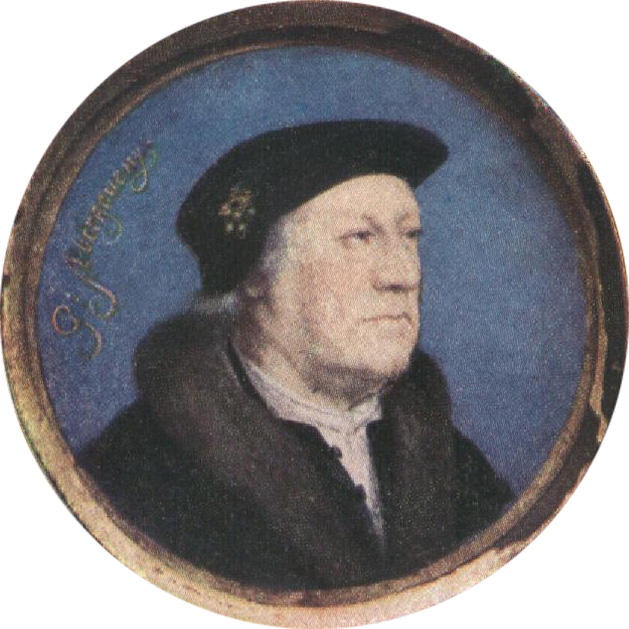
Miniature by Hans Holbein the Younger (Duke of Buccleuch collection)

George Nevill, 5th Baron Bergavenny (c.1469 – 1535), the family name often written Neville, was an English nobleman and courtier who held the office of Lord Warden of the Cinque Ports.

== Origins ==
He was the son of George Nevill, 4th Baron Bergavenny (died 20 September 1492) and his first wife, Margaret (died 28 September 1485), daughter of Hugh Fenn, Under-Treasurer of England.

His younger brother Sir Thomas Nevill was a trusted councillor of King Henry VIII and Speaker of the House of Commons. His youngest brother, the courtier Sir Edward Nevill, was executed by Henry in 1538 for treason.

== Career ==
As a second cousin of the new Queen, Anne Nevill, he attended the coronation of King Richard III in 1483 when, despite his young age, he was knighted. Having succeeded to his father's peerage and estates in 1492, he achieved prominence fighting against the Cornish rebels in 1497 at the Battle of Blackheath. In 1497 he took his place in the House of Lords and became involved in national affairs, being appointed to the privy council and in regular attendance at court. However, in 1506 he fell into serious trouble for keeping an illegal private army, being fined the immense amount of £100,000 and subjected to a travel ban. When Henry VIII became king in 1509, the fine was cancelled and a pardon granted. By 1512, he was back on the council and in 1513 was elected to the Order of the Garter. In that year he served in the expedition to capture Tournai and then to relieve Guînes.

At the coronation of Henry VIII, he held the office of Chief Larderer and in 1512 he was granted the castle and lands of Abergavenny. He was a keen jouster and accompanied both King Henry VII and King Henry VIII on state occasions, including the meetings in 1520 with King Francis I of France at the Field of Cloth of Gold and with Charles V, Holy Roman Emperor, at Gravelines.

The trial and execution in 1521 of his father-in-law Edward Stafford, 3rd Duke of Buckingham, led to his own imprisonment for a year in the Tower of London. After admitting he had concealed the duke's treason, he was stripped of all his offices, fined 10,000 marks and had to sell his house to the king. He was then pardoned, being allowed to continue serving at court, in Parliament and in war, but regarded with suspicion. In 1530 he signed the petition asking Pope Clement VII to dissolve Henry VIII's marriage to Katherine of Aragon and was allowed to buy back his house. At the coronation of Anne Boleyn in 1533, he once again was Chief Larderer and was allowed to officiate.

On 4 June 1535, he made his will at Eridge in Sussex and died on 13 or 14 June. He was buried at Birling, Kent, with his heart interred at Mereworth.

== Marriages and children ==
He first married Joan (died 14 November 1508), the daughter of Thomas FitzAlan, 17th Earl of Arundel, and his wife Margaret, the second daughter of Richard Woodville, 1st Earl Rivers and younger sister of Queen Elizabeth, wife of King Edward IV. According to Hawkyard, the marriage was childless; however according to Cokayne, Richardson and Cracroft, there were one or two daughters:

- Elizabeth Nevill, who married Henry Daubeney, 1st Earl of Bridgewater.
- Jane Nevill, who married Henry Pole, 1st Baron Montagu, elder brother of Cardinal Reginald Pole, executed for treason on 9 January 1539.

He married secondly, before 5 September 1513, Margaret, daughter of William Brent of Charing in Kent, without any children.

He married thirdly, about June 1519, Mary, youngest daughter of Edward Stafford, 3rd Duke of Buckingham, and his wife Eleanor Percy, with whom he had three sons and five daughters:

- Henry Nevill, 6th Baron Bergavenny.
- John Nevill.
- Thomas Nevill.
- Mary Nevill, who married first Thomas Fiennes, 9th Baron Dacre; secondly John Wootton (the brother of Henry Wotton), of Tuddenham; and thirdly Francis Thursby (the son of Thomas Thursby), of Congham.
- Katherine Nevill, who married Sir John St. Leger.
- Margaret Nevill, who married first John Cheyne (died 1544), eldest son of Sir Thomas Cheyne, and secondly Henry Poole, of Ditchling.
- Dorothy Nevill (died 1559), who married, as his first wife, William Brooke, 10th Baron Cobham, with whom she had a daughter, Frances Brooke, who married first Thomas Coppinger (1546–1580), and secondly Edward Becher.
- Ursula Nevill, who married Sir Warham St. Leger, second cousin once removed of her brother-in-law Sir John St. Leger.

Mary, Katherine, Margaret and Dorothy were married to heirs, whose wardships their father had acquired.

He married fourthly his mistress Mary Brooke, the aunt of his son-in-law William Brooke, who was pregnant at his death. with a daughter whose name is unknown. Mary was the daughter of Thomas Brooke, 8th Baron Cobham, and his first wife Dorothy, daughter of Sir Henry Heydon, of Baconsthorpe, and his wife Anne, daughter of Sir Geoffrey Boleyn, of Hever. This made her a second cousin of Queen Anne Boleyn.

== Arms ==
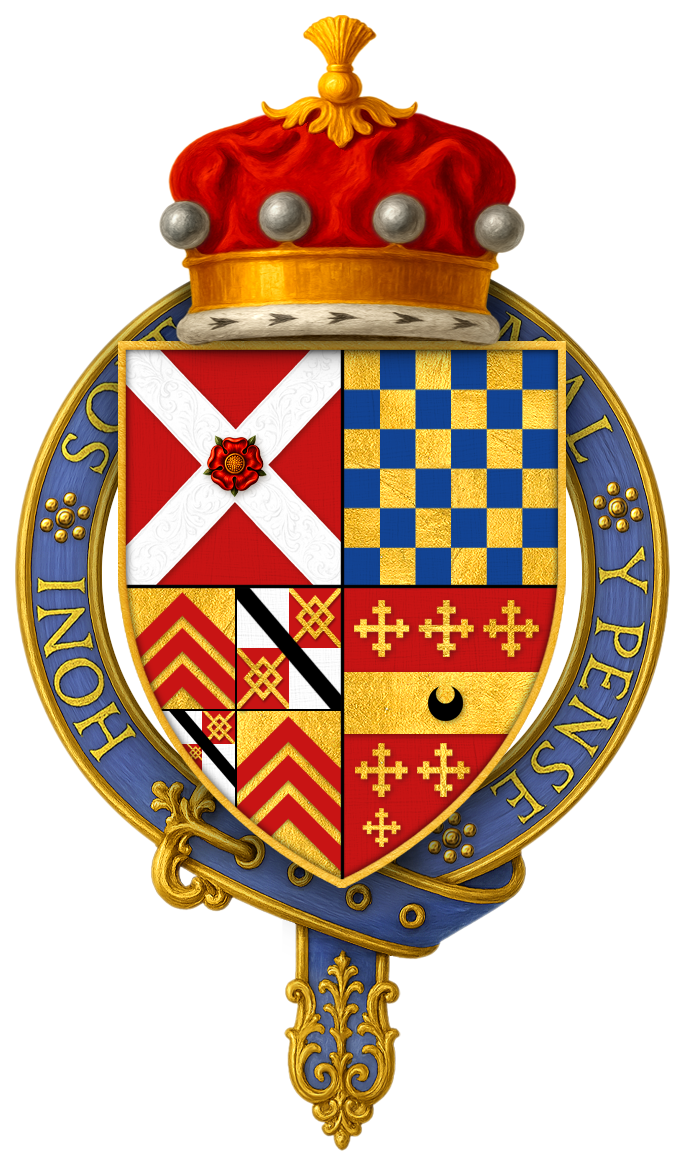
Quartered arms of Sir George Nevill, 5th Baron Bergavenny, KG, PC, as displayed on his stall plate in St. George's chapel - 1st, Nevill; 2nd, Warren; 3rd, quarterly Clare and Despencer; 4th, Beauchamp

Arms of Nevill, Barons Bergavenny: Gules, a saltire argent charged with a rose of the field (barbed and seeded proper). These are the ancient arms of Nevill differenced by a rose, the symbol of a 7th son, in reference to Sir Edward Nevill, 1st Baron Bergavenny (d.1476), husband of Elizabeth Beauchamp & 7th son of Ralph Nevill, 1st Earl of Westmorland. These arms have descended to the Nevill Marquesses of Abergavenny

== Ancestry ==
Ancestors of George Nevill, 5th Baron Bergavenny

8. Ralph Nevill, 1st Earl of Westmorland
4. Edward Nevill, 3rd Baron Bergavenny
9. Joan Beaufort
2. George Nevill, 4th Baron Bergavenny
10. Richard de Beauchamp, 1st Earl of Worcester
5. Elizabeth Beauchamp
11. Isabel Despenser
1. George Nevill, 5th Baron Bergavenny
12. Thomas Fenn
6. Hugh Fenn
3. Margaret Fenn
7. Eleanor

== Notes ==
Honorary titles
| Preceded by Sir Edward Poyning | Lord Warden of the Cinque Ports; 1534 | Succeeded by Sir Edward Guilford |
Peerage of England
| Preceded by George Nevill | Baron Bergavenny; 1492–1535 | Succeeded by Henry Nevill |
