= Richard Southwell (courtier) =

English Privy Councillor

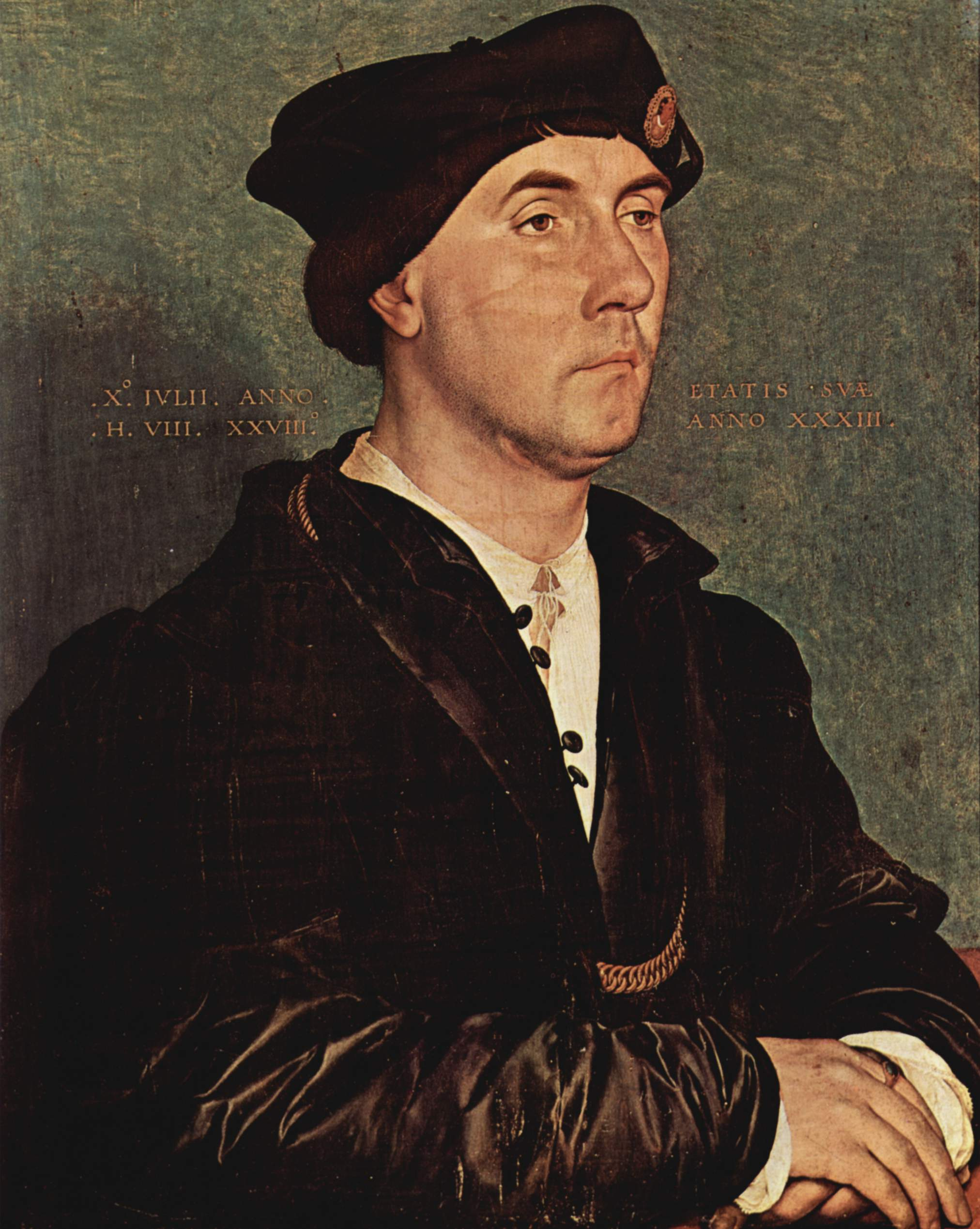
Portrait of Sir Richard Southwell by Hans Holbein the Younger

Arms of Southwell of Woodrising, Norfolk: Argent, three cinquefoils gules each charged with six annulets or

Sir Richard Southwell PC (c.1502/03 – 11 January 1564) was an English Privy Councillor.

== Biography ==
Southwell was born at Windham Manor in Norfolk, in 1502 or 1503. His parents were Francis Southwell, an auditor of the exchequer, and Dorothy Tendring, daughter of William Tendring. He was the eldest brother of Robert Southwell, Francis Southwell, and Anthony Southwell.) Richard's father died in 1512, and he inherited the estate. In 1514, his uncle Robert Southwell died, and the younger Southwell inherited that estate also. In 1515, he became the ward of his uncle's widow, Elizabeth Calthorpe (d. 1517), and William Wootton. In 1519, Thomas Wyndham acquired the wardship.

Wyndham married Southwell to his stepdaughter Thomasin, who was the daughter of Roger Darcy of Danbury in Essex and sister of Thomas Darcy, Baron Darcy. They had a daughter. He later married Mary, the daughter of Thomas Darcy of Danbury, and the widow of Robert Leeche of Norwich, Norfolk. They had one legitimate daughter who was born after their marriage and two illegitimate sons, who were born while Mary was still married to Leeche.

In 1526, Southwell entered Lincoln's Inn. He became tutor to Gregory Cromwell, son of Thomas Cromwell. For a while, Gregory lived with Southwell in Woodrising Manor in Norfolk. In 1531, Southwell became a Justice of the Peace for Norfolk and Suffolk. In 1532, he was involved in the murder of William Pennington, and the following year, he paid a fine of £1000 to obtain a pardon.

From 1534 to 1535, Southwell was High Sheriff of Norfolk and Suffolk. In 1536, his portrait was painted by Hans Holbein the Younger. He was a witness in the trial of Thomas More, where he claimed not to have heard the details of the damning conversation between Richard Rich and the accused. He was elected to the House of Commons in 1539 as knight of the shire for Norfolk and knighted in 1540. After the death of James V of Scotland, Southwell went to Edinburgh in January 1543 to negotiate with the Scottish lords.

Southwell was a principal accuser of Henry Howard, Earl of Surrey, who was arrested in December 1546 on charges (very likely trumped up) of threatening the succession of Prince Edward by displaying the lions of England in his personal coat of arms. Following the arrest of Surrey's father, Thomas Howard, third duke of Norfolk, Southwell was one of three royal commissioners (along with John Gates and Wymond Carew) sent to seize and inventory the Howards' possessions. (Note: Although Gates was the principal author, Southwell assisted him in inventorying Norfolk's mansion at Kenninghall as well as Surrey's house at St. Leonard's, Norwich. The manuscript inventory is National Archives (Kew) LR 2/117, with LR 2/116 and 115 accompanying follow-up accounts.) He was one of the assistants to the executors of the will of Henry VIII.

Southwell was one of the signatories of The Will of King Edward the Sixth, and His Devise for the Succession to the Crown. He was appointed to the Privy Council on 12 March 1547, although he was removed from the full council the following year. He was reappointed by Mary I. Southwell was described as the driving force behind the plan to marry Elizabeth I to Edward Courtenay, 1st Earl of Devon. He was re-elected to represent Norfolk again in 1542, 1553, and twice in 1554.

Southwell was Master of the Armoury from 1554 to 1559.

Southwell died on 11 January 1564.

== Notes ==
Military offices
Preceded by Sir Philip Hoby	Master-General of the Ordnance; 1554–1559	Succeeded by Ambrose Dudley
Political offices
Preceded by ?	Custos Rotulorum of Norfolk bef. 1544 – aft. 1547	Succeeded by Sir James Boleyn
