= Francis Southwell =

16th-century English politician

Francis Southwell (died 1581) was an English politician.

== Biography ==
Southwell was the third son of Francis Southwell and Dorothy, daughter and co-heiress of William Tendring. He was born about 1510. His eldest brother was Richard Southwell. Another brother was Robert Southwell.

In 1536 Southwell served on the royal commission that set the values of monasteries in Norfolk and Suffolk during the dissolution of the monasteries. After this, he acquired a series of royal leases during the late 1530s and early 1540s, before becoming an auditor of the Exchequer in November 1542. He continued to serve as a royal official in other commissions through the end of the 1540s. He served as member of parliament (MP) for Hertfordshire in 1554 and was MP for St. Albans in 1558.

Southwell first married Alice, daughter of William Standish. She died childless. On 6 August 1560, he married Barbara, daughter of John Spencer of Rendlesham Suffolk, who was the widow of Richard Catlyn (d. 1556) of Norwich and Honingham, Norfolk.

Southwell died on 19 Nov 1581, with his heir being his eldest son Miles. His will mentioned a daughter and other sons.
