= Wyatt's rebellion =

1554 popular uprising in England

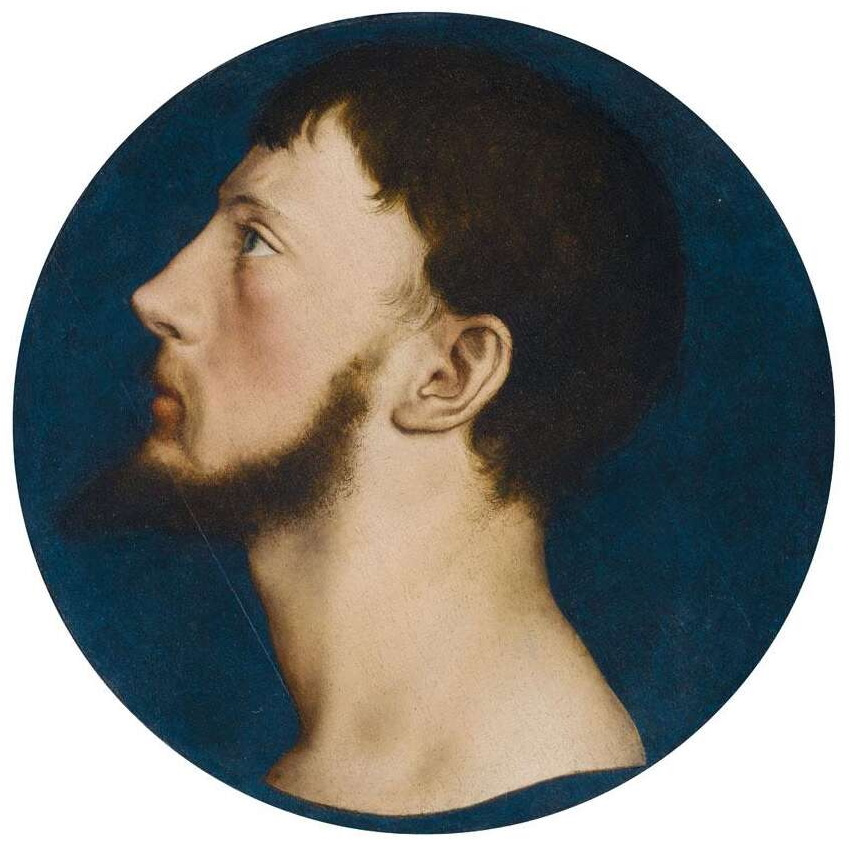
Portrait of Thomas Wyatt the Younger by Hans Holbein the Younger, circa 1540–42

Wyatt's Rebellion was a limited and unsuccessful uprising in England in early 1554 led by four men, one of whom was Thomas Wyatt the Younger. It was given its name by the lawyer at Wyatt's arraignment, who stated for the record that "this shall be ever called Wyatt's Rebellion". The rebellion arose out of concern over Queen Mary I's determination to marry a foreigner, Philip II of Spain, and to return England to the Catholic Church and papal authority. The uprising failed, with consequences for the rebels that ranged from death to forgiveness.

== Causes ==
David Loades states that “the main reasons which lay behind the rising were secular and political", but on the other hand Malcolm Thorp notes that “With but few exceptions, the leading conspirators were Protestants, and religious concerns were an important part of their decision to oppose Mary”. This difference of opinion is not surprising, given the complex interrelationship between religion and politics in 16th-century England.

=== Politics ===
Apart from the contested reign of Empress Matilda, Lady of the English and the brief and disputed reign of Lady Jane Grey, Queen Mary was the first woman to (successfully) reign in England in her own right. While the English expected her to marry, there was a general consensus that the queen should not marry a foreigner, since that could lead to the interference of a foreign power in English affairs. On 16 November 1553, a Parliamentary delegation went to the Queen and formally requested that she choose an English husband, with its obvious although tacit candidate being her kinsman Edward Courtenay, recently created Earl of Devon. But Mary’s cousin the Emperor Charles V, also king of Spain, saw that an alliance with England would give him supremacy in Europe; he sent his minister to England to propose his son Philip as a person whom the religious and political interests of the world recommended for Mary.

Mary was convinced that the safety of England required her to form a closer relationship with Charles's family, the Habsburgs, and she decided to marry Philip. A marriage treaty was presented to the Privy Council on 7 December 1553, and even though the terms clearly favoured England and included several safeguards, many still thought that England would be drawn into Philip's wars and become a mere province of the Habsburg Empire. This was of particular concern to the landed gentry and parliamentary classes, who foresaw having to pay greater subsidies to cover the cost of England's participation in foreign wars. Most also knew the stories of the torture and cruelty endured by prisoners of the Spanish Inquisition, and there were even those "who had suffered from the rack of the inquisitors" themselves.

It was not just the English who were alarmed by the pending marriage of Mary and Philip. France, too, feared an alliance between England and Spain. Antoine de Noailles, the French ambassador to England, "threatened war and began immediate intrigues with any malcontents he could find". The Venetian ambassador Giacomo Soranzo formed an alliance with Noailles, and was later accused of taking an active part in the rebellion. Before Christmas in 1553, anti-Spanish ballads and broadsheets were circulating in the streets of London.

=== Religion ===
Mary I was known to be devoted to the Roman Catholic faith, and many feared she would restore the pope as the head of the Church of England and reverse the anti-papal religious policies put in place by her father, Henry VIII, and continued under his successor, Mary's half-brother Edward VI. Mary had “bitterly disapproved of the changes made in the form of worship” by Henry, and “regarded the cause of the pope as her own”. Mary’s convictions were so strong that when Edward’s parliament passed an Act of Uniformity that required all church services to be in English, she continued to have the traditional Latin mass celebrated in her private chapel. When this was expressly forbidden, Mary appealed to Charles, who “went to the extreme of threatening England with war if Mary's religion was interfered with”.

Mary assumed the throne in July 1553 and on August 18 she issued a proclamation that was a major step toward reestablishing papal authority as it “strictly forbade Protestant preaching”. This not only confirmed the fears of Protestants, it raised the concern of most others who were opposed to Rome and did not want to see the pope at the head of the English church again.

Those fears of papal restoration were heightened by Mary's pending marriage to Philip, who was considered “the most powerful and the ‘most Catholic’ sovereign in Europe”, although his father did not make him King of Spain until 1556.

=== Other ===
Beyond the beliefs of the leaders, the rebellion acted as a way for the lower classes to voice their frustrations. Specifically, yeomen, husbandmen, and urban workers were able to express social and economic frustrations through the rebellion. Though the unrest was not universal, it was symptomatic of a wide range of discontent among the English population.

== Participants ==
The key insurgents were Thomas Wyatt, Sir James Croft, Sir Peter Carew, and Henry Grey, Duke of Suffolk.

=== Sir Thomas Wyatt ===
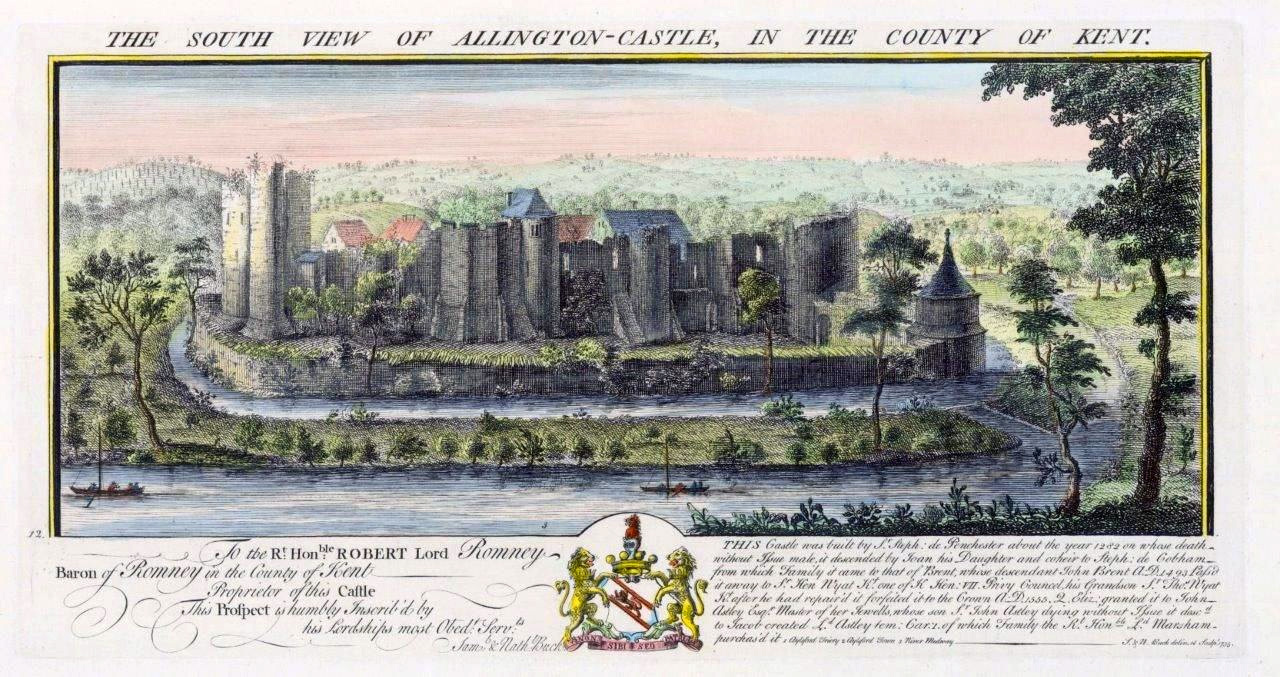
Allington Castle, Wyatt's home in Kent, as it looked in the 18th century

Wyatt owned large areas of land in Kent and had great influence there. Although Wyatt initially seems to have supported Mary and did declare her to be queen, he was against her marriage to Philip, saying that it would lead to the “most miserable servitude, and establish popish religion”. However, Wyatt cautioned against using religion as the reason for the rebellion “for that wil withdraw from us the heartes of manye: you must only make your quarrel for ouerrunninge by straungers”. As an apparent aside, he did go on to say, "in counsel, as unto my friend", that the sole goal was a return to Protestantism.

Wyatt has been described as “hot-headed" with a reputation for being wild and impetuous, and once spent a month in the Tower of London for participating in a street riot in London. At one point, he and his neighbours in Kent had put together a plan for a local militia, and that gave Wyatt a way to quickly mobilise armed forces. Wyatt, like many, depended on the Privy Council for offices and income; under Mary, not being a Roman Catholic could put that in jeopardy, and that may also have been a reason why he chose to rebel.

=== Sir James Croft ===
James Croft came from an influential Herefordshire family. Unlike Wyatt, Croft appears not to have made the same kind of strong statements regarding Mary's marriage to Philip, so his motivation for participating in the rebellion is less clear. He was not particularly strong in his religious beliefs but probably favoured Protestantism as he did not have any problem supporting Protestant efforts when they were part of his duties while Lord Deputy of Ireland in 1551 and 1552. While there, he was to “set forth God's service, according to our ordinances” including imposing the Anglican Prayer Book in the Irish Church. Croft's military career and service are likely to have informed his decision to participate in the rebellion, and he would have had the same concerns as Wyatt with respect to his future financial well-being. This concern would have been even greater for Croft since he was clearly out of favour with Mary well before the rebellion.

=== Sir Peter Carew ===
Carew (an MP for Devon) was a maritime adventurer, and according to his contemporary biographer, he was "an earnest promoter of God's true religion" and “constant in advancing the Protestant cause”. The Spanish ambassador reported to Philip that Carew was "the greatest heretic and rebel in England" and noted how in Parliament, he supported Courtenay as Mary's potential husband (the Courtenays were a Devon family) and opposed the restoration of the Catholic religion. Like Wyatt and Croft, Carew also feared a Spanish marriage would endanger his career.

=== Henry Grey, Duke of Suffolk ===
The list of conspirators also includes the Duke of Suffolk (based for part of his life in Leicestershire) who was "an hearty Friend unto the Gospel" and continued to profess it until his death" He was the father of Lady Jane Grey, who had been proclaimed queen by the Privy Council after the death of Edward VI in an abortive attempt to prevent the accession of Mary.

=== William Thomas ===
William Thomas was an avowed Protestant who was known as a “hot gospeller” and is viewed by some historians as the original leader of the rebellion.

=== Edward Courtenay ===
Edward Courtenay was the great-grandson of Edward IV. He also was the imprisoned son of the Marquis of Exeter and the grandchild and last living Plantagenet. In the eyes of his countrymen, Courtenay’s long confinement had given him “graces of mind and body” and he was the preference of many who wanted Mary to marry an Englishman.

=== Other rebels ===
Although the total number of insurrectionists is known to have been much higher, the names of some 750 have been found in various records, often with their status or trade and their parish. The roles they played in the rebellion are mostly subject to conjecture, but some of the more well-known are Sir Nicholas Throckmorton, who is quoted as saying he "wished it Were lawfull for all of ech Religion to live safelie according to their conscience,” along with Sir Henry Isley, Lords John and Thomas Grey (brothers of Suffolk), Sir Nicholas Arnold, and Leonard Digges, a mathematician.

== Plan ==
A number of historians have named Thomas as the original leader of the rebellion, with his plan involving the assassination of Mary by John FitzWilliams. There are differences in the chain of who told whom about the plot, but Wyatt ended up learning of it. He was so against the idea that he set out to beat FitzWilliams (or Thomas, depending on the historian).

Around 26 November 1553, a different plan began to evolve, led by Wyatt, Croft, Carew and Suffolk. The first idea was for there to be an uprising in Devonshire where Philip was expected to land and where Carew and Courtenay had resources to call upon. By Christmas of 1553, however, it was decided that each of the four leaders would raise rebellion forces in their respective counties, and together they would converge on London, on 18 March 1554, which was shortly before Philip was expected to leave from Spain. They would then replace Mary with her half-sister Elizabeth, who would then marry Courtenay. Meanwhile, a fleet of French ships would prevent Philip of Spain from reaching England.

Several historians mention a “voice in the wall” in connection with the rebellion. There is no agreement as to whether this was a planned part of Wyatt’s Rebellion or something done by others coincident with it. In each case, however, it involves a young girl, Elizabeth Croft, hidden in the wall of a house in London and pretending to be a spirit. Among other things, she would denounce Mary and Philip, Catholic mass and confession. She was ultimately discovered and confessed to her role. It does not appear that Elizabeth was related to Sir James Croft, as there is no-one named Elizabeth who would have been of the right age in the genealogy in O. G. S. Croft's "The House of Croft of Croft Castle."

== Rebellion ==
To be successful, the rebellion needed many participants, and rumours quickly spread with varying degrees of accuracy. As early as 29 December 1553, Simon Renard, Spain’s ambassador to England, informed Mary of a suspected plot in which “certain persons are trying to persuade Courtenay to seize the Tower of London”.

=== Carew flees ===
Some of the rumours would have come from Devon where Carew was making little effort to hide his efforts to raise support for the rebellion. He was able to gain enough support to take over Exeter Castle, but Carew lacked sufficient influence in Devon to fulfil his part in the rebellion, at least in part due to his role in suppressing the Prayer Book Rebellion in 1549. Carew's activities attracted the attention of the Privy Council, and on 7 January 1554, it sent a “lettre of apparaunce” to him with the intention of either confining him in the Tower of London, if he appeared, or causing him to show his hand by not appearing. Carew did not appear, leading the Council to send a letter to the sheriff of Devon to bring Carew to the Council. The sheriff told Carew about the letter and gave him time to sell his farm and flee to France on 25 January 1554. Carew was readily received in France and was given the task of encouraging others to come to help France’s support of the rebellion. The French supplied them with arms, ships, and money, and they plundered Flemish and Spanish ships, swearing that they would not let Philip set foot on English soil. Mary was alarmed by the number of desertions and their potential threat and demanded that King Henry II of France capture them and hand them over to her, which he refused. But as time went on, the insurgents in France “found their leisure very heavy on their hands, and their purses very light in their pockets” and they began to return to England. Carew, however, stayed in France until the summer of 1554 when he went to Italy.

=== Courtenay arrested ===
Shortly before Carew fled, Courtenay was arrested and admitted to having been approached by individuals concerning "several things touching religion and the marriage." His revelations on 21 January were followed by the arrests of two or three men who had committed to the cause, and it became clear that the rebellion could not wait until 18 March. The next day, Wyatt called a meeting of his key supporters, and the decision was made to start the rebellion in three days' time.

=== Suffolk hides ===
Coincident with 25 January as a start date for the rebellion, a messenger from Mary arrived to tell Suffolk that he was to come to court. He hid his true intentions by saying, "I was comyng to her grace. Ye may see I am booted and spurred redy to ryde.” He gave the messenger a reward and drink and escaped. Suffolk gathered up as much money as he could and rode without stopping to Lutterworth, where others joined him. On the morning of 29 January, Suffolk read Wyatt’s proclamation in Leicester, and on the next day, he led his troops toward Coventry where there were others who believed in the rebellion and were expected to open the gates for him. But with the rebellion having been exposed, the gates were closed and the walls defended.

Suffolk was ill, and learning that he was now a wanted man, he took refuge with his brother, Lord John Grey. They hid in the cottage of one of Lord Grey's gamekeepers, intending to lie low until they could escape abroad. Deciding that the cottage was not safe, Suffolk hid in the hollow of a nearby old decaying tree. He stayed there for two days and a night in the cold of winter and without food. Either because of the reward, or fear of retribution for aiding Suffolk, the gamekeeper betrayed Suffolk’s hiding place. When troops arrived, they found Suffolk warming himself by a fire, unable to endure the cold any longer. His brother was found buried under some bundles of hay. The two were arrested and imprisoned in the Tower of London.

=== Croft surrenders ===
Croft was somewhat more successful than the Duke of Suffolk, leaving London to raise forces in Wales. Several trained local forces and their leaders joined with Croft, but that caught the attention of the Council, which sent orders to the Lord President of the Council of the Marches to stop the rebels. Unable to defeat the troops from the Council, Croft and his forces set up camp on the bank of a stream to wait for reinforcements that were supposed to be coming from Wales. However, the Council troops surrounded the camp, preventing the insurgents from getting food. Croft's forces tried to fight their way out, but most were either killed or taken prisoner. Without the ability to continue the fight, Croft surrendered and was imprisoned in the Tower of London.

=== Wyatt perseveres ===
Wyatt started the uprising on 25 January 1554 by raising his standard at Maidstone and with the ringing of church bells and the reading of a proclamation there and elsewhere saying that Mary’s marriage to Philip would "bring upon this realm most miserable servitude, and establish popish religion". Setting up his headquarters at Rochester, Wyatt had gained a force of about 2,000 by 27 January with men coming from other towns.

On 28 January, a rebel force of about 500 was heading to Rochester to join up with Wyatt when they were met by a force of about 600 supporters of Mary led by Lord Abergavenny and Sir Robert Southwell, the High Sheriff of Kent. The rebel forces were routed, leaving behind 60 prisoners. About the same time, a force of 500 Whitecoats (so called because their uniforms were all white) was sent from London under the command of the elderly Duke of Norfolk. But instead of attacking the insurgents as they were supposed to do, the Whitecoats came down the hill to Rochester shouting "We are all Englishmen", deserting to the rebels. Wyatt had been able to seize some of Mary's ships waiting to escort Philip and some cannon, and with the addition of the Whitecoats, his forces had grown to about 3,000. The Whitecoats urged him to move quickly on London saying, "London longed sore for their coming".

Three days later, the insurgents were on the road to London when they were met by delegates sent by Mary with instructions to discuss Wyatt’s grievances with him. The delegates told Wyatt that Mary wanted to understand the cause of the rebellion, which would make him a traitor, since in his proclamations he had called himself true to the Crown. On the surface, this would seem to have been an attempt at opening negotiations, but the real purposes were to gain time for Mary to increase the strength of her forces and to hear Wyatt state the reasons for the rebellion to help her plan a course of action. If Wyatt refused to negotiate, Mary would be able to say that Wyatt was "aiming at the crown, and intended to overthrow religion, shed blood, sack London, ruin the kingdom and bring in the French". Wyatt answered the delegates saying that he was no traitor, and the purpose of the rebellion was to defend against being overrun by strangers which would surely occur if the marriage took place. The delegates then extended Mary's offer for Wyatt to come to her and be heard, to which Wyatt agreed stating "I wyll rather be trusted than trust" and adding the requirements that he be given control of the Tower of London, with Mary in it, and sole discretion for replacing certain members of the Council.

Wyatt's answer reached Mary the next day (1 February). Noailles, the French ambassador, noted that if Wyatt had been able to reach London at the same time as his answer did, the gates would have been open and "the whole population eager to give him welcome". Instead, Wyatt’s delay gave Mary time to use his words against him, which she did in a speech later that day at the Guildhall which was full due to it being Candlemas. Mary delivered a rousing speech, telling of her desire to quell the rebellion by mercy instead of justice of the sword. She shared Wyatt's "insolent and proud answere" and addressed the issue of her marriage to Phillip saying that she was already married to the people of England and that nothing was "more acceptable to my hart, nor more aunswerable to my wyl, then youre aduauncement in wealthe and welfare". Mary’s speech was tremendously successful, as the next day there were some 25,000 ready to protect her and London from Wyatt and his forces, which had grown to about 15,000 men. Mary also issued a proclamation declaring Wyatt a traitor and offering a reward of £100 for his capture, dead or alive.

Wyatt arrived at Southwark on 2 February, intending to cross the River Thames and enter London by way of London Bridge. But the gates were closed and "the drawbridge flung down into the water". The residents of Southwark saw the guns of the Tower of London aimed at Southwark and begged Wyatt to leave. On 6 February, he headed to Kingston, marching at night with the goal of surprising Mary at daybreak. The bridge there (the next one upstream at this time) was broken, but Wyatt’s men repaired it and crossed over and continued on for London. Wyatt lost time repairing a cannon that had broken down and which he refused to leave. He also lost the element of surprise and many of his men lost hope of success and deserted him. As Wyatt continued on, he and his remaining rebels encountered artillery fire and attacks from horse brigades. When the remaining force arrived at Ludgate, they found it defended. Wyatt turned and headed back towards Westminster only to be met by other forces loyal to Mary and a brief skirmish ensued. Wyatt met with a herald who urged him to earn the queen's pardon by avoiding further bloodshed. Wyatt surrendered, and he and his chief supporters were taken to the Tower of London.

=== Elizabeth summoned ===
Although Elizabeth was not an active participant in the rebellion, Mary did not know that, and acted on the assumption that she was. Mary had Elizabeth watched continuously, but became concerned that Elizabeth might go into hiding before there was enough evidence to arrest her. Under the guise of keeping her from harm, Mary sent a letter to Elizabeth on 26 January 1554 for her to come and stay with Mary for her own protection. The intent, however, was to arrest Elizabeth as soon as she arrived. Perhaps sensing the trap, Elizabeth declined, saying that she was too ill to travel.

== Final crushing of the rebellion ==
=== General ===
The end of the rebellion might be said to have begun on 5 February 1554 with the deciphering of an intercepted letter from Noailles to the king of France. It identified the purpose of the rebellion as the dethroning of Mary in favour of Elizabeth. There was nothing in it to indicate any complicity on the part of Elizabeth, but it did include Courtenay’s role, which had not been included in his “confession” at his earlier arrest which put the blame on everyone except himself. Two days later, a proclamation was issued that forbid the sheltering of any insurgent under pain of death. Hundreds of fugitives were given up; so many that prisons could not hold them all, and churches were used to house them while they waited for what they assumed would be their deaths by hanging, the punishment for treason. A general execution of the common prisoners began on 12 February 1554 with gallows that had been erected all over London. For weeks, prisoners were tried on a daily basis with hanging, often with the body then beheaded, quartered or both, and displayed. But out of some 3,000 captured insurgents, only about 150 were executed with the rest only receiving a few days in prison. Those kept in prison longer were ultimately freed on 20 January 1555 at the request of Philip. Lady Jane Grey and her husband Lord Guildford Dudley were also executed, even though they had no part in the rebellion. In addition, Mary rewarded her key supporters with large pensions. Charles V was reluctant to give these because of the amounts, but many of the recipients were old so the pensions to them would not be paid for long, and he agreed to them.

The small number of executions together with the lack of incriminating evidence against Elizabeth led Renard to conclude that Mary was being too lenient with the rebels, making it unsafe for Philip to be in England. Charles also believed that the alliance between England and Spain would fail if Elizabeth remained alive. But because Elizabeth had powerful friends and was widely popular, Renard did not believe that action could be taken against her without conclusive proof of her complicity in the rebellion. In an attempt to get incriminating evidence against Elizabeth, those suspected of having information on Elizabeth's role were held without knowing what might happen to them so that they could incriminate her in the hope of being pardoned. During this time, torture also was used in the attempt to get the desired evidence. Those examining the leaders are also reported as having used “trick” questions to get the answers they wanted, accurate or not.

=== Wyatt ===
As a leader in the rebellion, Wyatt's trial was delayed from his 7 February 1554 surrender until 15 March. Despite being "travailed with" during that time, he did provide some information, but it was limited and somewhat infrequent. He named Sir William St. Loe, Elizabeth’s servant, as the one who initiated the rebellion, an indirect implication of Elizabeth's involvement. He also said that Croft knew more about it. When Wyatt finally was brought to trial, he pleaded guilty to treason, asserting that he never intended any harm to Mary and only wanted to prevent the "comyng in of strandgers and Spanyerds". He offered to provide “great discoveries” if his life were spared, claiming that Courtenay was the originator of the rebellion and that it was planned for Courtenay's benefit. Wyatt also accused Elizabeth of having been involved in the conspiracy. Whatever conclusions the court drew from Wyatt’s testimony, it was not enough to keep him from being sentenced to death by hanging, with his body to be drawn and quartered. However, it was some time before the sentence would be carried out, in the hope that more could still be learned from him. Wyatt's sentence was finally carried out on 11 April 1554 without his having provided anything of significance to incriminate Elizabeth. Before he was hanged, however, he avowed that neither Elizabeth nor Courtenay were involved with the rebellion. He admitted that he had testified differently at his trial, and said, "That which I said then I said", answered Wyatt, "but that which I say now is true." Shortly after, Wyatt’s estate was forfeited with most of it distributed among those who had been active in suppressing the rebellion.

=== Croft ===
After surrendering, Croft was imprisoned in the Tower of London on 21 February 1554. Like Wyatt, Croft's trial was delayed by well over a month, to 17 April but then postponed until 28 April. As was the case for Wyatt, Croft was "marvellously tossed and examined" with respect to Elizabeth. At his trial, Croft confirmed Wyatt's accusation of Elizabeth's servant, St. Loe, as the originator of the plot. At some point, he also confessed that the French ambassador Noailles had agreed to French support of the rebellion. Croft was found guilty of "high treason" and "bad judgement", but the Earl of Arundel spoke on Croft’s behalf and he was pardoned and released from the Tower on 18 January 1555, "bounde" over to a "good abearinge" and fined £500. Despite the many credible sources that corroborate the treatment of Croft, there is one that states, without any apparent basis, "Not only does it seem that Sir James Crofts was never arrested, but that they did not even summon him, which rejoices everybody, by reason of his universal good character".

=== Carew ===
Carew remained in Italy until the spring of 1556 when his wife was able to get the Council to obtain a pardon for him from Philip. With a friend, he started out for Antwerp first, but the two were ambushed, blindfolded, taken to the coast and put into a fishing boat. They had no idea of where they were being taken and feared for their lives. When they heard a bell that Carew recognised as the Tower Bell, their hopes were raised. Carew was soon set free upon the payment of a fine.

=== Suffolk ===
Because of Suffolk’s participation in the rebellion, his daughter Lady Jane Grey, and her husband Guildford Dudley were beheaded on 12 February, five days before Suffolk's trial on 17 February 1554. Suffolk was haughty in defending himself, immediately challenging the judge by asking if it was treason for a peer like himself to make a proclamation and raise support to keep strangers out of the realm, but the judge did not answer the question. When the issue of his resistance to the forces sent against him was raised, Suffolk again made an arrogant reply which gave the court what it needed to convict him. He was sent back to the Tower, his arrogance gone, and was beheaded six days later.

=== Elizabeth ===
With the rebellion over, Charles V sent word to Mary in March that he was relying upon her to protect his son Philip in England. He specifically wanted “immediate and summary” judgement for both Courtenay and Elizabeth, pointing out that Mary now had an opportunity to fulfil her duty to the church and should not neglect that. But Elizabeth had wide popularity and powerful friends, such as the Lord Admiral of England, leading Charles to conclude that proof of Elizabeth’s complicity was needed before any judgement could be imposed. Mary again summoned Elizabeth to come to London, but assuming Elizabeth’s previous claim of illness was a ploy, she sent two of her own physicians and three Privy Council members. The physicians determined that although the illness was real, it need not prevent Elizabeth from travelling to London despite her fears that it could cause her death. They had brought Mary’s litter for her and made the trip in stages of not more than eight miles a day. Elizabeth arrived in London on 23 February, with the curtains of her litter opened. She was pale and dressed in white, with a proud, haughty expression. Mary refused to see Elizabeth, and put her in a secluded part of her palace where no one could pass without encountering a guard.

The Council was divided with respect to Elizabeth, with many members supportive of her. This led to bitter arguments and disagreement as to her fate. On 16 March, Elizabeth was examined again and this time, those on the Council that were against her claimed the evidence sufficient to send her to the Tower. While Elizabeth’s friends on the Council argued against it, they acquiesced when the question was raised as to who would be responsible for her if she were not in the Tower, since whoever took on such a responsibility would be in great danger and the subject of much suspicion. Elizabeth was not moved immediately, however. Fearing the Tower could end up meaning her death, Elizabeth made one last appeal to Mary which was in writing since Mary still would not see her. In it, Elizabeth swore her innocence and her loyalty to Mary. Mary did not answer, and on 18 March, Palm Sunday, Elizabeth was imprisoned in the Tower. A few days after her imprisonment in the Tower, Elizabeth was again examined. This time Croft was present since the questioning was in regard to an intercepted letter to her from Croft recommending that she move to a different one of her properties. Elizabeth protested against the continued attempts to link her to the insurgents and questioned why she needed to justify moving between her own houses. As Croft was being led away, he knelt down in front of Elizabeth and expressed sadness that he should be thought of as a witness against her. He said he was sorry to see the day in which he should be brought as a witness against her, and that he had been ”marvellously tossed” when being examined about her. He further denied any attempt to involve Elizabeth in the rebellion, on pain of death. In April, letters were distributed throughout London “as seditious as possible and in favour of the Lady Elizabeth” as well as letters that specifically said: “Stand firm and gather together, and we will keep the Prince of Spain from entering the kingdom”. These letters may or may not have helped Elizabeth’s situation, but she was released from the Tower on 19 May 1554 although still kept confined.

=== St. Loe ===
Being accused by both Wyatt and Croft, St. Loe was arrested and questioned in March 1554. Although he strongly denied the allegations and affirmed his loyalty, the examination led to his imprisonment in the Tower but he was later released.

=== Courtenay ===
Courtenay was imprisoned in the Tower on 12 February 1554 where he was confronted by Wyatt in front of three witnesses. Wyatt asserted that Courtenay was involved in the plot which had been planned for his benefit. Although Courtenay denied it, there were other prisoners who also accused him of involvement and provided information on his role. However, established law did not prescribe the death penalty for someone who had only consented to treason and not committed any overt act. Instead, the person was to be sentenced to life in prison with all of their property to be confiscated. Unable to find any credible evidence that Courtenay had committed acts of treason, the government exiled him to Italy where he lived until his death two years later.

=== Thomas ===
While in the Tower awaiting trial, Thomas stabbed himself in the stomach with a bread knife. It was not fatal, and he was arraigned on 9 May 1554. Thomas was charged with putting his plot to murder Mary in writing, found guilty and sentenced to death. On 18 May, he was hanged, beheaded and quartered but not before vehemently declaiming against Mary and declaring that he "died for his country".

=== Throckmorton ===
On 17 April 1554, Throckmorton was brought to trial and charged with high treason for “imagining the death of the Queen, levying war in the realm, and adhering to the Queen's enemies” as well as conspiring to “deprive the Queen of her royal estate” and devising a plan to take control of the Tower of London. His trial is notable because he was the only insurgent to be acquitted. Treason trials in the sixteenth century were very one-sided with the normal rules of evidence and procedure ignored as judges, barristers and others involved in the prosecution vied with one another in abusing the accused. For them, it was a way to show loyalty to, and gain favour with, the crown. Throckmorton was aware of this and addressed it directly, going so far as to reference the word of God as spoken by his prophet, “Cursed be he that doth his office craftily, corruptly, and maliciously.” Throckmorton also challenged second-hand testimony, demanding that the accusers be brought to court to present their testimony in person to give him a chance to cross-examine them. He was refused. Testimony that he gave while in the Tower was read, but selectively. Throckmorton asked that it be read in full, but was refused. Throughout his trial, he fought the charges brought against him and “dissected the depositions with the skill of a practised pleader.” At one point, Throckmorton commented that he perceived the many questions put to him as “a trap to catch others greater than himself." At the end of Throckmorton’s trial, the jury’s unanimous verdict was " Not guilty." The jury was encouraged to rethink its decision, but the foreman answered that they had reached the verdict “agreeably to all our consciences.” Despite the verdict, Throckmorton was kept in custody for “other matters to be charged against him.” As he left the court, the waiting crowd threw up their caps and shouted. However, the jurors were not so fortunate. They were arrested and kept in prison until winter and then only released by payment of an exorbitant fine. After the death of Mary, Throckmorton served Elizabeth as an ambassador to France and Scotland. The complete transcript of Throckmorton’s trial can be found in Howell and Hollinshed.

== Legacy ==
Despite the limited immediate impact of Wyatt’s Rebellion, it had some lasting effects. Many, including some of his adversaries, were sympathetic to his daring and gallantry, and at the time of Wyatt’s execution, people crowded to dip their handkerchiefs in his blood. “His legend was quickly being established.” Many began to view Wyatt as a martyr, and those who disliked Mary’s marriage to Philip regarded Wyatt and his followers as patriots and not heretics. Christopher Goodman, a 16th century clergyman, wrote the following: “If it is treason to defend the Gospel and his country from cruel strangers and enemies, then was Wyatt a traitor and rebel. But if this was his duty, and all others that professed Christ amongst you, then are all such traitors, as did deceive him: and such as took not his part also, when time and occasion by him was justly offered.”

== Note on names ==
Spelling variations are common in early writings, both between documents and within them. Here are some name variations that appear:

- Wyatt: Wyat, Wyet, Wyatte, Wyate, Wiat
- Croft: Crofts, Croftes
- Carew: Carewe, Carow
- Mary: Marie

== Sources ==
- Aikin, Lucy (1818). Memoirs of the Court of Queen Elizabeth. Vol. I. Longman, Hurst, Rees, Orme, and Brown.
- Ainsworth, William Harrison (1863). Cardinal Pole: or, The days of Philip and Mary. Vol. I. Chapman and Hall.
- Brewer, J. S.; Bullen, William, eds. (1867). Calendar of the Carew Manuscripts, 1515-1574. Longmans, Green, Reader & Dyer.
- Brown, Rowdan, ed. (1877). Calendar of State Papers Relating To English Affairs in the Archives of Venice. Vol. 6, 1555–1558.
- Cooke, William Henry (1882). Collections Towards the History and Antiquities of the County of Hereford. Vol. III. John Murray, Albemarle Street.
- Croft, O. G. S. (1949). The House of Croft of Croft Castle. E. J. Thurston. ASIN B001PHODVY.
- Cruden, Robert Peirce (1823). The History of the Town of Gravesend and of the Port of London. William Pickering.
- Flaherty, William Edward (1862). The Annals of England: An Epitome of English History. Vol. II. John Henry & James Parker & Co.
- Flaherty, William Edward (1876). The Annals of England: An Epitome of English History (Library ed.). James Parker and Co.
- Fletcher, Anthony (1970). Tudor Rebellions (Second ed.). Longman Group Limited. ISBN 9780582313897.
- Foxe, John (1838). Cattley, Rev. Stephen Reed (ed.). The Acts and Monuments of John Foxe. Vol. VI. R. B. Seeley and W. Burnside.
- Foxe, John (1875). Foxe's Book of Martyrs. Charles Foster Publishing Company.
- Foxe, John (1903). Seccombe, Thomas (ed.). Tudor Tracts 1532-1588. The Imprisonment of the Princess Elizabeth: E. P. Dutton and Co.
- Froude, James Anthony (1910). The Reign of Mary Tudor. London: J. M. Dent & Sons, New York: P. Dutton & Co.
- Goodman, Christopher (1558). How Superior Powers Ought To Be Obeyed By Their Subjects: And Wherein They May Lawfully By God's Word Be Disobeyed And Resisted (PDF) (Modern by Patrick S. Poole ed.).
- Guiseppi, M. S., ed. (1936). Calendar of the Patent Rolls Preserved in the Public Record Office, Phillip and Mary 1554-1555. Vol. II. His Majesty’s Stationery Office. pp. 4 v.
- Harbison, E. Harris (1940). Rival Ambassadors at the Court of Queen Mary. Princeton University Press; Oxford University Press. ISBN 978-1597403832.
- Heard, Nigel (2000). Edward VI and Mary: A Mid-Tudor Crisis? (Second ed.). Hodder & Stoughton. ISBN 9780340743171.
- Holinshed, Raphaell (1808). Holinshed's Chronicles of England, Scotland and Ireland.
- Howell, T. B., ed. (1816). A Complete Collection of State Trials and Proceedings for High Treason and Other Crimes and Misdemeanors. Vol. I. T. C. Hansard.
- Lemon, Robert, ed. (1856), Calendar of State Papers, Domestic Series, of the Reigns of Edward VI., Mary, Elizabeth, 1547-1580, Longman, Brown, Green, Longmans & Roberts
- Loades, David M. (1992). Two Tudor Conspiracies (Second ed.). Headstart History. ISBN 1873041233.
- Loades, David M. (1999). Politics and Nation, England 1450-1660 (Fifth ed.). David Loades.
- Loades, David (2012). Mary Tudor. Amberley Publishing. ISBN 9781445608181.
- Mackie, J. D. (1952). The Earlier Tudors 1485-1558. The Oxford History of England. Oxford University Press.
- MacLean, John (1857). The Life and Times of Sir Peter Carew. Bell & Daldy.
- Miller, Helen (1982). "WYATT, Sir Thomas II (by 1521-54), of Allington Castle, Kent".
- Nares, Edward, ed. (1828). Memoirs of the Life and Administration of the Right Honourable William Cecil, Lord Burghley. Vol. I. Saunders and Otley.
- Nichols, John Gough, ed. (1850). "A Resident in the Tower of London". The Chronicle of Queen Jane, Two Years of Queen Mary, and Especially of the Rebellion of Sir Thomas Wyat. Camden Society.
- Phillipps, Samuel March, ed. (1826). State Trials; or, A Collection of the Most Interesting Trials, Prior to the Revolution of 1688. Vol. I. W. Walker.
- Prescott, H. F. M. (1953). Mary Tudor: The Spanish Tudor (1953 Reissue ed.). Phoenix. ISBN 9781842126257.
- Proctor, John (1808). Grose, Francis; Astle, Thomas (eds.). The Antiquarian Repertory. Vol. III. "The Historie of Wyate's Rebellion".
- Seton-Watson, R. W., ed. (1924). Tudor Studies. Longmans Green & Co.
- Southern, Henry; Nicolas, Nicholas Harris, eds. (1827). The Retrospective Review and Historical and Antiquarian Magazine. Vol. Second Series, Vol. I. Baldwin, Cradock and Joy.
- Stevenson, Rev. Joseph, ed. (1863). Calendar of State Papers, Foreign Series, of the Reign of Elizabeth, 1558-1559. Longman, Brown, Green, Longmans & Roberts.
- Stow, John (1631). Annales or a General Chronicle of England. Augmented by Edmund Howes. Richardi Meighen.
- Strype, John (1816). Ecclesiastical Memorials. Vol. Fourth. Samuel Bagster.
- Strype, John (1822). Ecclesiastical Memorials, Relating Chiefly To Religion, And The Reformation Of It. Vol. III (Part I ed.). Clarendon Press.
- Thorp, Malcolm R. (1978). "Religion and the Wyatt Rebellion of 1554". Church History: Studies in Christianity and Culture. 47 (4): 363–380. doi:10.2307/3164313. JSTOR 3164313.
- Tittler, Robert; Loach, Jennifer, eds. (1980). Mid-Tudor Polity c. 1540-1560. Rowman and Littlefield. ISBN 9780847662579.
- Tittler, Robert (1987). The Reign of Mary I (Fifth ed.). Longman Group UK Limited. ISBN 0582353335.
- Turnbull, William R., ed. (1861). Calendar of State Papers, Foreign Series, of the Reign of Mary, 1553-1558. Longman, Green, Longman, & Roberts.
- Tyler, Royall, ed. (1916). "Calendar of State Papers, Spain". British History Online.
- Tyler, Royall, ed. (1949). "Calendar of State Papers, Spain". British History Online.
- Tytler, Patrick Fraser (1839). England Under the Reigns of Edward VI. and Mary. Vol. II. Richard Bentley.
- Weikel, Ann (1980). Tittler, Robert; Loach, Jennifer (eds.). The Mid-Tudor Polity c.1540-1560. The Marian Council Revisited: Rowman and Littlefield. ISBN 9780333245286.
