= Robert Southwell (lawyer) =

English civil servant

Sir Robert Southwell (c. 1506 in Windham Manor, Norfolk – 1559 in Mereworth) was an English civil servant during the reigns of Henry VIII, Edward VI, and Mary I. He was elected Member of Parliament from Kent in October 1553 and in 1555. In January–February 1554 Southwell, then the High Sheriff of Kent, was one of the key loyalist officers engaged against the Wyatt's rebellion. According to D. M. Loades, "Sir Robert Southwell and Lord Abergavenny were almost the only significant gentlemen in the country whose loyalty was never in doubt. So resolute was Southwell's opposition to Wyatt that it is tempting to regard them as personal enemies, but .. there is no evidence for this."

== Early life ==
Robert Southwell belonged to a wealthy family from Norfolk. He was the son of Francis Southwell and the younger brother of Privy councillor Sir Richard Southwell and the elder brother of Francis Southwell and Anthony Southwell who married Anne Le Strange, daughter of Sir Thomas Le Strange. On 1 May 1536, he married Margaret Neville (d. 25 December 1575), the daughter of Sir Thomas Neville, MP from Kent, fifth son of George Neville, 2nd Baron Bergavenny Through the marriage he acquired Mereworth in Kent, which became his principal residence and where he was buried. Southwell was Catholic.

He settled on a career in law, became a reader at the Middle Temple and served at the Court of Augmentations, making a fortune through speculation in former monastery lands. In 1543, he was granted the manor of Hoxne in Suffolk, which was later inherited by his son, Thomas. He temporarily controlled estates at Leveland, Ditton, West Peckham and Swanton Hall near Mereworth. D. M. Loades noted that "there was nothing to choose between Southwell and Wyatt", his future enemy, when it came to monastic lands. Southwell supported his brother Richard in his rivalry with the Howards; after their fall Southwell was rewarded with lands in Badlesmere, Kent.

He was elected Member of Parliament for the constituency of King's Lynn in 1529, 1536, and 1539. He was knighted in 1537.

He served as Common Serjeant of London from 1535 to 1536 and Master of Requests in 1540. In 1543–1550 he was appointed Master of the Rolls although, according to D. M. Loades, he then lived in Kent where he gained "some influence" through his marriage connection. Michael Zell wrote that it was customary to have at least one high-ranking judge permanently living in Kent.

== Wyatt's rebellion ==
In the first year of the reign of Queen Mary I Southwell was appointed High Sheriff of Kent. According to James Anthony Froude, he was a vocal opponent of the proposed Spanish marriage of Mary and Philip II. This made him and his faithful in-law Henry Neville, Lord Abergavenny, valuable potential assets to Thomas Wyatt the Younger and his conspiracy circle. Whether Southwell and Abergavenny would join the revolt remained uncertain until it broke out in earnest on 25 January 1554. According to D. M. Loades, Southwell remained unconditionally loyal to Mary. He was not aware of the rebel's council held at Allington Castle on 22 January, but had other signals of the brewing revolt and actively spied upon the rebel Henry Isley. On 24 January, one day before the revolt, Southwell and Abergavenny began recruitment of the loyalist forces, although with little success. Eastern Kent countryside, influenced by loyalist families, remained largely unaffected by Wyatt's rebellion, but the larger towns leaned to Wyatt. On 26 January Wyatt declared Southwell and Abergavenny "traitors to God, the Crown and the Commonwealth" for "stirring up the Queen's most loyal subjects of the realm."

According to Froude, on 25 January Abergavenny raised two thousand men and attacked rebel Henry Isley at Wrotham. Abergavenny's men prevailed over the rebels and then deserted to Wyatt's army. According to D. M. Loades, on 25 January Southwell reported to the Council in London that recruitment made only "some headway" and advised that the Queen must leave London for a safer place. By 27 January the loyalists's position improved, and their combined forces in Kent matched the numbers of Wyatt's force in Rochester, at around two thousand men on each side. However, the loyalists were scattered, and Wyatt could rely on additional forces held by the Isleys in nearby Tonbridge and Sevenoaks. According to D. M. Loades, Southwell and Abergavenny with six hundred men blocked the road from Tonbridge to Rochester to prevent consolidation of the rebels. On 27 January Southwell realised that the townsfolks stood for Wyatt and did not dare to engage the rebels. On the next day Henry Isley marched from Sevenoaks to Rochester. This time, Southwell was compelled to fight, and managed to defeat Isley's company at Wrotham, taking around sixty prisoners.

On the same 28 January Duke of Norfolk boldly led his unstable army into Kent. He did not notify Southwell and Abergavenny of his plans, and his forces deserted to Wyatt at the earliest convenience. After the defeat of Norfolk at Rochester Southwell fled to London. Wyatt marched to London himself with around three thousand men, but lost the initiative; Southwell and Thomas Cheney managed to raise another loyalist company in his rear. On 4 February Southwell and Abergavenny marched to Greenwich. Londoners rumoured that their force reached three thousand men (actual strength of the loyalists is unknown). Wyatt was cut off from his base in Kent, and could not count on reinforcements while the loyalists' forces gained strength every day.

By 7 February Wyatt's army disintegrated. Southwell was dispatched to mop up the rebels remaining in Kent and on 10 February set up his headquarters in Wyatt's Allington Castle. His men, supported by Earl of Pembroke's cavalry, tracked the rebels and soon filled the local jails to the point "that serious disruption was threatened to the life of the county". He interrogated the prisoners himself and reported their statements and his own opinions to Stephen Gardiner in London. He requested the formation of a special court for speedy handling of his prisoners. This court, the Kent Commission, was formed on 24 February. Of 230 prisoners indicted before the Kent Commission, only 42 were convicted. D. M. Loades wrote that the blunt of Marian justice mostly hit Londoners: 45 of 76 convicted Londoners were sentenced to death, compared to 30 out of 350 for the Kentish men. Southwell was obliged to execute the rebels convicted in London and sent to die in their home county. The first group of 18 men was executed on 18 February, followed by two on 24 February and eight (including the Isley brothers) on 28 February. More "transfers to Southwell" followed until the middle of March.

On the occasion of the marriage of Mary and Philip Southwell was rewarded with a pension of five hundred pounds per annum.

== Marriage and issue ==
On 1 May 1536 Southwell married Margaret Neville, the daughter of Sir Thomas Neville, fifth son of George Neville, 2nd Baron Bergavenny, and Katherine (née Dacre), widow of George FitzHugh, 7th Baron FitzHugh (d. 28 January 1513), and daughter of Humphrey Dacre, 1st Baron Dacre of Gilsland, and Mabel Parr, the daughter of Sir Thomas Parr (d. 24 November 1464). The birth dates of five of their children are recorded in a Book of hours:

- Thomas Southwell (b. 24 March 1537 – 1568), who married firstly, Mary, daughter of Sir Henry Jerningham of Costessey, Norfolk, by whom he had no issue; secondly Mary Mansell, the daughter of Sir Rice Mansell of Glamorganshire, Wales, by whom he had a son and heir, Sir Robert Southwell, and thirdly Nazareth Newton (d. 1583), daughter of Sir John Newton, of Hawtrey, Somerset, by whom he had a daughter, Elizabeth, who married Sir Barentyne Molyns of Clapcot by Wallingford in Berkshire (now Oxfordshire) (son of Michael Molyns MP). After Thomas Southwell's death his widow, Nazareth, married Thomas Paget, 4th Baron Paget.
- Francis Southwell (b. 14 December 1538).
- Anne Southwell (b. 18 March 1540).
- Dorothy Southwell (b. 21 September 1542).
- Henry Southwell (b. 4 September 1543).

Although the birth of Southwell's fourth son, Robert, is not recorded in the Book of Hours, he is mentioned in connection with the manor of Merstham in 1569.

Sir Robert Southwell died 26 October 1559, and on 13 November 1561 Margaret married William Plumbe. She died 25 December 1575, and was buried in the Church of St Giles at Wyddial, Hertfordshire, where she is commemorated by a memorial brass.
