= Windham Manor =

Windham Manor was a manor house in Norfolk, England. It was owned by the Southwell family and was the birthplace of Richard Southwell and Robert Southwell.

== See also ==
- Felbrigg Hall
