= Henry Isley =

English nobleman involved in Wyatt's Rebellion

Sir Henry Isley was an English nobleman involved in Wyatt's Rebellion.

The Isley family were established landowners of Kent county. Henry Isley owned Sundridge manor estate in Brasted, his brother Thomas Isley (Jr.) in Vinters Park near Maidstone. He was appointed sheriff of Kent for 1542 and 1550. 1542 he was appointed to be master of the hunt and overseer of all the deer in Northfrithe park in the manor, honor, or lowy of Tunbridge [now Tonbridge], Kent; keeper of Northfrith and chief steward and bailiff of the lordship or manor of Hadlow. The Lowy of Tunbridge had previously belonged to the Dukes of Buckingham.

Between 1547 and 1550 protestants George Harper, Thomas Culpepper, Thomas Wyatt the younger and Henry Isley, all strongly associated with King Edward VI's regency council, had followed each other as sheriffs of Kent. Immediately after the accession of Queen Mary I Isley was arrested, but managed to make peace with the new regime, accepting the changes in the established religion and was released.

On 22 January 1554 Henry Isley attended a meeting of thirty key conspirators at Wyatt's Allington Castle. On 25 January Wyatt took control of Maidstone in an open revolt; brothers Thomas and Henry Isley operated their own detachments separately from Wyatt's main forces. On 27 January 1554, when Wyatt occupied Rochester, Henry Isley and his men stayed at Sevenoaks. On the next day, however, Henry Isley and his five hundred men marched out of Sevenoaks to join Wyatt at Rochester. Loyalist sheriff Robert Southwell intercepted Henry Isley at Wrotham and defeated the rebels, taking around sixty men prisoners. Isley himself fled to Hampshire. The Crown offered pardon to all rebels, excluding Isley, Wyatt, Harper and Rudstone, and offered a £100 bounty for the capture of each ringleader.

By the end of February all the rebels were apprehended and imprisoned in the Tower of London. The trials began on 10 February and were largely over by 22 February. The case against the leaders was examined by the Westminster Commission. Henry Isley was sentenced to death and executed. The overwhelming majority of noble rebels were fined and set free, and some released without fine.
