= Moatenden Priory =

Priory in Headcorn, Kent, England

Coordinates: 51°11′16″N 0°36′5″E

Moatenden Priory was a priory located at Headcorn, about six miles south of Maidstone in Kent, England.

== History ==
Founded in 1224 by Robert de Rokesley, seneschal to King Henry III, Moatenden was the first priory in England of the Trinitarian Order. The original moat (enclosing an area of 120m x 110m) and fishponds are still extant but after the priory was dissolved in 1536 a farmhouse was built on the site and only a fragment of the medieval structure survives.

During the Reformation, a patent was issued to Thomas Cromwell confirming his estate, possession and interest in the site of the late priory, of Mottenden, and the manors of Mottenden, Plushenden, Plomford, and Delmynden in Kent; the rectory of Lancing, Sussex, and all tithes thereto belonging; the advowson of the parish church of Lancing and the vicarage of the same church; a saltmarsh in Canwynden alias Derwishop, Essex; and all lands, &c., in the counties of Kent, Sussex, and Essex, late of John Gregory alias John Harietsham, late minister of the Trinitarian priory of Mottenden.
