= Elizabeth Amadas =

Elizabeth Amadas (née Bryce) (died 1532) was a lady at the royal court of King Henry VIII of England who was accused of treason, and who claimed to have been the target of the King's advances.

== Life ==
Elizabeth Bryce was the daughter of James Bryce by his wife, Elizabeth Chester (d.1504), and the granddaughter of Sir Hugh Bryce (d. 22 November 1496), Goldsmith, and Lord Mayor of London in 1485. She married a London Goldsmith, Robert Amadas, whose talents quickly made him the richest goldsmith in England. By Robert Amadas she had two daughters, Elizabeth and Thomasine. Elizabeth Amadas married Richard Scrope of Castle Combe, Wiltshire, and is said to have left as her sole heir a daughter, Frances Scrope (d.1566), who married Martin Bowes. Thomasine Amadas was the first wife of Sir Richard Stapleton (d. 11 January 1585), by whom she had a son, Brian Stapleton (d. 13 December 1606), who married Eleanor Neville, daughter of Ralph Neville, 4th Earl of Westmorland. After Eleanor Neville's death, Sir Brian Stapleton married Elizabeth Darcy, the daughter of George Darcy, 2nd Baron Darcy de Darcy.

Robert Amadas made his will in 1531, and had died by 14 April 1532.

In 1532 Elizabeth Amadas was arrested for treason. She had described Anne Boleyn as a harlot, and said that she should be burnt. She also said that the king, by setting aside Catherine of Aragon for a younger woman, was encouraging the men of England to do the same. Elizabeth's husband had recently left her. She described herself as a "witch and prophetess". She was released, but the couple got into debt and did not recover their position at court.

She also stated that Henry VIII had asked her many times to join her at the house of William Compton in Thames Street. She alleged that Compton and Dauncy had brought messages from the King to her. She did not state when this was, although Compton died in 1528 so it must have been before this. She also did not state if she gave in to the King's advances.

In July 1533, an Elizabeth Amadas claimed that she had earlier been solicited to become Henry VIII's mistress. She predicted that Anne Boleyn would be burned as a harlot, and said that men should not be able to set aside their wives, as the King was attempting to do with Catherine of Aragon. Elizabeth Amadas claimed that her own husband had left her. She was arrested for her treasonous comments, and it is said that Robert Amadas was ordered to pay several hundred pounds for 'missing plate' owned by the King.

However Virgoe and others consider this identification to be mistaken, and conclude that the Elizabeth Amadas who made these allegations was likely Elizabeth (née Buttockshide) Amadas, the daughter of Anthony Buttockshide of St Budeaux, Devon, and wife of John Amadas (c.1489–1554/5), sergeant-at-arms to Henry VIII:

Cromwell seems to have treated [John Amadas] circumspectly, perhaps because the Mistress Amadas who prophesied against the King and Anne Boleyn and predicted a Parliament of Peace to be held in the Tower may have been his first wife...Elton's identification of the prophetess of 1533 with Elizabeth, widow of Robert Amadas, is unacceptable as she married Sir Thomas Neville soon after the goldsmith's death in 1532.
