= George Nevill, 4th Baron Bergavenny =

English nobleman (c. 1440 – 1492)

George Neville
- Baron Bergavenny
- Born: c. 1440
- Died: 20 September 1492 (about 52)
- Noble family: House of Neville
- Spouses: Margaret Fenn; Elizabeth Warde
- Issue: George Neville, 5th Baron Bergavenny; John Neville; William Neville; Sir Edward Neville; Sir Thomas Neville; Sir Richard Neville; Elizabeth Neville
- Father: Edward Neville, 3rd Baron Bergavenny
- Mother: Elizabeth Beauchamp

George Neville, or Nevill, 4th and de jure 2nd Baron Bergavenny (c. 1440 – 20 September 1492), was an English nobleman.

== Career ==
George Neville was the son of Edward Neville, 3rd Baron Bergavenny and Elizabeth Beauchamp. He was knighted by Edward IV on 9 May 1471, after fighting for the king, who was his cousin, at the Battle of Tewkesbury. He succeeded his father in 1476.

== Marriages and issue ==
Neville married firstly, before 1 May 1471, Margaret Fenn (d. 28 September 1485), the daughter and heiress of Hugh Fenn, by whom he had six sons and a daughter:

- George Neville, 5th Baron Bergavenny (c. 1469 – c. 1535)
- John Neville
- William Neville
- Sir Edward Neville (1471–1538), who married, before 6 April 1529, Eleanor (née Windsor), widow of Ralph Scrope, 9th Baron Scrope (d. 17 September 1515), and daughter of Andrew Windsor, 1st Baron Windsor
- Sir Thomas Neville (c. 1484 – 1542), Speaker of the House of Commons, who married, firstly, Katherine Dacre, and, secondly, Elizabeth Bryce
- Sir Richard Neville (bef. 1485 – c. 1515)
- Elizabeth Neville, who married, firstly, Thomas Berkeley, esquire, of Avon, Hampshire, and, secondly, Richard Covert, esquire, of Slaugham, Sussex

He married, secondly, Elizabeth Warde. She was the widow, successively, of Richard Naylor, Sir Robert Basett and John Stokker. There were no issue with his second marriage.

Bergavenny was a captain in the English forces at Calais in 1490, and died in 1492.

== Ancestry ==
Ancestors of George Nevill, 4th Baron Bergavenny

16. Ralph Neville, 2nd Baron Neville de Raby
8. John Neville, 3rd Baron Neville de Raby
17. Alice Audley
4. Ralph de Neville, 1st Earl of Westmorland
18. Henry de Percy, 2nd Baron Percy
9. Maud Percy
19. Idoine de Clifford
2. Edward Neville, 3rd Baron Bergavenny
20. Edward III of England
10. John of Gaunt, 1st Duke of Lancaster
21. Philippa of Hainault
5. Lady Joan Beaufort
22. Payne de Roet
11. Katherine Swynford
1. George Nevill, 4th Baron Bergavenny
24. Thomas de Beauchamp, 11th Earl of Warwick
12. William de Beauchamp, 1st Baron Bergavenny
25. Katherine Mortimer
6. Richard de Beauchamp, 1st Earl of Worcester
26. Richard Fitzalan, 11th Earl of Arundel
13. Lady Joan FitzAlan
27. Elizabeth de Bohun
3. Elizabeth de Beauchamp
28. Edward le Despencer, 1st Baron le Despencer
14. Thomas le Despenser, 1st Earl of Gloucester
29. Elizabeth de Burghersh
7. Isabel le Despenser, Countess of Worcester and Warwick
30. Edmund of Langley, 1st Duke of York
15. Constance of York
31. Infanta Isabella of Castile

== Notes ==
Peerage of England
Preceded by Edward Nevill	Baron Bergavenny; 1476–1492	Succeeded by George Nevill
