= Edward Neville, 3rd Baron Bergavenny =

English noble (died 1476)

Edward Neville
- Baron Bergavenny
- Died: 18 October 1476
- Noble family: Neville
- Spouses: Elizabeth de Beauchamp; Katherine Howard
- Issue: Richard Nevill; George Nevill, 4th Baron Bergavenny; Alice Nevill; Catherine Nevill; Margaret Nevill; Anne Nevill
- Father: Ralph Neville, 1st Earl of Westmorland
- Mother: Joan Beaufort

Arms of Edward Nevill, Baron Bergavenny: Gules, a saltire argent charged with a rose of the field (barbed and seeded proper). These are his paternal arms of Neville differenced by a rose, the symbol of a 7th son. These arms are borne today by his descendants the Neville Marquesses of Abergavenny

Edward Neville, de facto 3rd (de jure 1st) Baron Bergavenny (died 18 October 1476) was an English nobleman.

== Family ==
He was the 7th son of Ralph Neville, 1st Earl of Westmorland, and Joan Beaufort, daughter of John of Gaunt and Katherine Swynford).

In 1436 he married Elizabeth de Beauchamp (died 18 June 1448), daughter of Richard de Beauchamp, 1st Earl of Worcester, and the former Isabel le Despenser, who later succeeded as de jure 3rd Baroness Bergavenny. They had four children:

- Richard Nevill (before 1439 – before 1476), eldest son and heir apparent, predeceased his father;
- George Nevill, 4th Baron Bergavenny (c. 1440–1492), 2nd and eldest surviving son and heir;
- Alice Nevill, who married Sir Thomas Grey;
- Catherine Nevill (born c. 1444), who married John Iwardby.

Shortly after his first wife's death, in the summer or autumn of 1448, he married Katherine Howard, a daughter of Sir Robert Howard and sister of John Howard, 1st Duke of Norfolk. His second wife bore him three additional daughters:

- Catherine Nevill (b. c. 1452/bef. 1473) married Robert Tanfield (b. 1461), son of Robert Tanfield and Elizabeth Brooke, daughter of Edward Brooke, 6th Baron Cobham, and Elizabeth Touchet, born c. 1433, and had children.
- Margaret Nevill (b.bef. 1476–1506), who married John Brooke, 7th Baron Cobham; John and Margaret are the grandparents of Elizabeth Brooke, Lady Wyatt;
- Anne Nevill (b.bef 1476-1480/81) did not long survive her father.

== Career ==
Neville was knighted sometime after 1426.

In 1438, Bergavenny, as he was now styled, was a justice of the peace for Durham.

He was a captain in the embattled Duchy of Normandy in 1449. His eldest son Richard was one of the hostages given to the French when the English surrendered the city of Rouen in that year.

After the death of his first wife, he was summoned to Parliament in 1450 as "Edwardo Nevyll de Bergavenny", by which he is held to have become Baron Bergavenny. At the time, however, this was considered to be a summons by right of his wife, and so he was considered the 3rd, rather than the 1st, Baron.

In 1454, he was appointed to the Privy Council assembled by the Duke of York as Lord Protector, along with his more prominent Neville kinsmen. He was a commissioner of array in Kent in 1461, and was a captain in Edward IV's army in the North the following year. He was again a commissioner of array in 1470, remaining loyal to Edward IV, unlike his nephew, the Earl of Warwick.

== Ancestry ==
Ancestors of Edward Neville, 3rd Baron Bergavenny

16. Ralph Neville, 1st Baron Neville
8. Ralph Neville, 2nd Baron Neville
17. Euphemia de Clavering
4. John Neville, 3rd Baron Neville
18. Hugh de Audley, 1st Baron Audley of Stratton Audley
9. Alice Audley
19. Iseude Mortimer
2. Ralph Neville, 1st Earl of Westmorland
20. Henry de Percy, 1st Baron Percy
10. Henry de Percy, 2nd Baron Percy
21. Eleanor Fitzalan
5. Maud Percy
22. Robert Clifford, 1st Baron Clifford
11. Idoine de Clifford
23. Maud de Clare
1. Edward Neville, 3rd Baron Bergavenny
24. Edward II of England
12. Edward III of England
25. Isabella of France
6. John of Gaunt
26. William I, Count of Hainault
13. Philippa of Hainault
27. Joan of Valois
3. Joan Beaufort
14. Payne de Roet
7. Katherine Swynford

Peerage of England
New creation	Baron Bergavenny; 1447–1476	Succeeded by George Nevill
