= Hugh Fenn (died 1476) =

English official (d. 1476)

Hugh Fenn (about 1418–1476), also written Fenne or atte Fenn, was an English official from Norfolk who rose to a high position in the Exchequer during the reigns of King Henry VI and Edward IV.

== Career ==
Born about 1418, the son of Thomas Fenn, a leading citizen of Great Yarmouth, and grandson of the MP Hugh Fenn, he may have had some education at Cambridge University and at Gray's Inn. By 1444 he was an official in the Exchequer and in 1450 as clerk to John Somer, an Auditor, had to report to Parliament on the state of the nation's finances.

As a royal official, he took charge of properties falling into Crown hands. For example, in 1450 he was keeper of lands at Wratting forfeited by William de la Pole, 1st Duke of Suffolk and in 1451 of lands at Swaffham. On John Somer's death in 1453, Fenn was appointed to succeed him as Auditor by John Tiptoft, 1st Earl of Worcester, the Lord High Treasurer of England. At the age of about 35, he became one of the most senior officials in the department and was well placed, over and above his official business, to help friends, neighbours and relations in their legal and financial affairs.

Two influential Norfolk connections of his were the Paston family and Sir John Fastolf, a possible relation for whom he stood guarantor in 1452. His name occurs frequently in the Paston Letters as using his knowledge and contacts to advance that family's interests, with Margaret Paston noting that: he is called right feythfull and trosty to his frendes that trost hym. Another service was to be executor of a will, acting for instance for Sir Geoffrey Boleyn in 1463 and for the sheriff of Essex, Sir John Clay, in 1464.

In addition to his responsibilities at Westminster, he was appointed escheator of Norfolk and Suffolk in 1456 and a justice of the peace for Norfolk from 1457, as well as sitting on other Norfolk commissions. The victory of the Yorkist faction in 1460 ended these posts in East Anglia but enhanced his standing in the Exchequer, where in 1463 he was promoted to the major office of Under-Treasurer of England. When at a dinner next year the Lord Mayor of London, Sir Matthew Phillip, was not given the seat of honour and walked out insulted, it was a delegation led by the Speaker of the House of Commons, Sir John Say, and including the Under-Treasurer, Hugh Fenn, that went to Guildhall to apologise.

From 1464 he started attending meetings of the Privy Council, and remained active in national affairs for the rest of his life, being appointed to a commission to survey royal property in the Windsor area on 24 February 1476, only days before his death.

Working in London, he had chambers in Holborn, properties in Smithfield and Kentish Town and a house with land in Hackney. However, in common with many pursuing successful urban careers, he also invested in the prime status symbol of rural landholdings and their associated rights. For example, by about 1466 he was lord of the two manors of Herringby, known as Herringby Spencers and Herringby Fenns, and was patron of the church. Another enterprise was acquiring a wardship, with the right to choose the spouse of an under-age heir, which in 1466 he did in partnership with William Essex (later one of his executors) for Nicholas Carew. A further area was advowsons, where in 1468 he acquired the right of presentation to the Suffolk churches of Ufford and Combs together with the chantry of the Blessed Virgin Mary in the church of St Andrew at Brundish. In 1471 he bought the patronage of Castle Acre Priory.

== Family and legacy ==
He made his will on 24 February 1476, asking to be buried next to his mother's tomb in the chancel of Herringby church, and presumably died a few days later. He left a widow called Eleanor and one child, a daughter called Margaret. Margaret was already the wife of Sir George Nevill, heir to the 3rd Baron Bergavenny, and had the first four of their eventual eight children. His widow lived until 28 September 1485, and was buried at St Bartholomew-the-Great, Smithfield.

The first concern of his will was taking care of his widow, his daughter and his grandchildren. Then there were bequests to friends and relations, to the parish church (100 marks for the roof) and to Norwich Cathedral (500 marks for the steeple), but then mainly to founding and endowing a charity in Herringby. The two manors he owned there, with other lands and rights, were to be settled on an almshouse, sometimes called Herringby College, as its source of income. It was to have a master, three priests, eight poor people and two servants, all overseen by a committee of county notables. Beyond the social purpose of sheltering indigent people, the prime purpose of the establishment was religious, for as bedesmen the inmates would say daily prayers for the soul of Hugh Fenn while the priests would celebrate masses for him. Like many religious foundations in England, it did not survive the upheavals under King Henry VIII. Its assets were first appropriated by Cardinal Wolsey to fund a charitable project in Ipswich, which collapsed with his fall from power. Then in 1546 the site and all its lands in Herringby were sold by the Crown to Sir Thomas Clere.

An interesting feature of his will for that time is that he named some of his books and specified who they were to go to. For example, his Lives of the Saints was to go to his wife and on her death to his granddaughter Elizabeth. To his eldest grandson George, future 5th Baron Bergavenny, he left the primer he wrote out himself, his psalter, and his copy of De Regimine Principum.
