= Squerryes Estate =

Estate including vineyard in Kent

Coordinates: 51.2616°N 0.0641°E

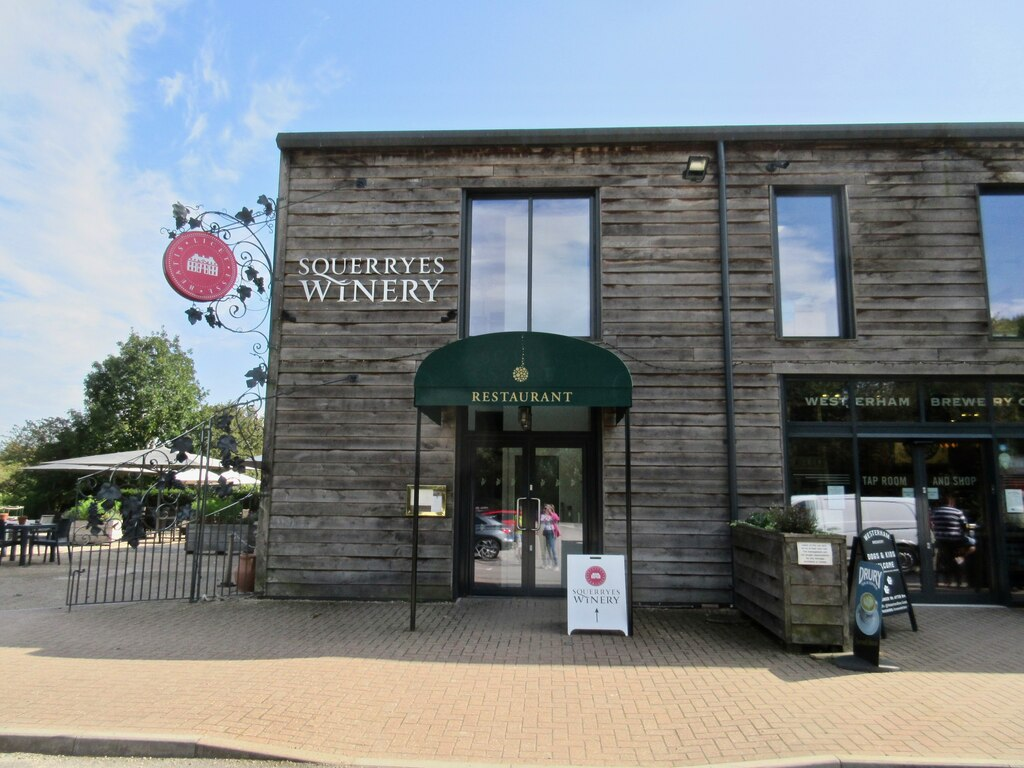
Winery Restaurant

Squerryes Estate is a vineyard, estate, and location of Squerryes Court, a grade I listed building in Kent, England. It is a producer of English sparkling wine.

== Estate ==
The Squerryes Estate consists of 2,500 acres and borders Surrey to the west and Greater London to the north.

All the farms on the estate have been amalgamated into a single agricultural unit. There is a 200-head dairy herd which produces milk for Marks & Spencer. The calves are reared on the farm; the Friesian heifers join the herd, while the bull calves and cross-bred heifers are grown for beef using the natural grazing in the park. The arable land produces millet, wheat, malting barley, and oilseed rape, together with oats, barley and beans for the cattle.

One third of the estate is woodland. Almost all of the traditional farm buildings have been restored and converted into offices or workshops, which are let to local businesses. Some farm houses and cottages have been refurbished and let to tenants.

== Squerryes sparkling wine ==
In 2004, a champagne house visited the estate to research the possibilities of expanding their English production, finding that the lower chalk band and upper greensand bore similarities to the Côte des Blancs region of Champagne. When the house pulled out of negotiations, the Warde family decided to continue with the endeavour, planting 35 acres of grapes in 2006. The initial Champagne clones planted were Chardonnay, Pinot noir and Pinot Meunier. In 2008 the vines began to fruit, and the estate took its first reserves in 2010. Squerryes is one of the last vineyards in Europe to harvest its crop, and the wine is left on the lees for at least 30 months.

In May 2015, Squerryes' 2010 Brut won two gold medals in two of the most competitive and esteemed international blind tasting competitions, the Sommelier Wine Awards and International Wine Challenge. In 2016, Squerryes Brut 2011 won the National Trophy for Best English Sparkling Wine in Tom Stevenson's 'Champagne and Sparkling Wine World Championships'. The label currently sells two styles of the sparkling wines: brut and rosé. The brut is composed of 45% Chardonnay, 35% Pinot noir, and 20% Pinot Meunier. The rosé is composed of 75% Pinot noir and 25% Pinot Meunier.

== Brewery ==
In 2013, the Westerham Brewery announced its plans to relocate to the Squerryes estate, expanding its production area to 6,000 square feet. The brewery produces the Scotney range of beers using hops from the National Trust's only hop garden at Scotney Castle, Lamberhurst, Kent. The Westerham Brewery Co. Ltd was established in 2004 to make craft beer in Kent. Established at the National Trust's Grange Farm in Crockham Hill, the brewery has won multiple awards and supplies over 300 pubs in Kent, London, and the South East. In a press release, the brewery indicated its intention to continue supplying spent hops from the brewery to the gardeners at Chartwell and spent brewers grains to feed the Squerryes dairy herd.
