= Listed buildings in Westerham =

Civil Parish in Kent, England

Westerham is a town and civil parish in the Sevenoaks District of Kent, England. It contains three grade I, eleven grade II* and 142 grade II listed buildings that are recorded in the National Heritage List for England.

This list is based on the information retrieved online from Historic England

== Key ==
Grade	Criteria
I	Buildings that are of exceptional interest
II*	Particularly important buildings of more than special interest
II	Buildings that are of special interest

== Listing ==
Name	Grade	Location	Type	Completed (Note: The date given is the date used by Historic England as significant for the initial building or that of an important part in the structure's description.)	Date designated	Grid ref. (Note: Sometimes known as OSGB36, the grid reference is based on the British national grid reference system used by the Ordnance Survey.) Geo-coordinates	Notes	Entry number (Note: The "List Entry Number" is a unique number assigned to each listed building and scheduled monument by Historic England.)	Image	Wikidata
Charmans Farmhouse	II	Beggars Lane, Charmans Farm			16 January 1975	TQ4566755099; 51°16′35″N 0°05′13″E		1243974	Upload Photo	Q26536622
Grange Cottage	II	Crockham Hill			16 January 1975	TQ4476049960; 51°13′50″N 0°04′19″E		1272619	Upload Photo	Q26562444
Larksfield	II	Crockham Hill			16 January 1975	TQ4428451350; 51°14′35″N 0°03′56″E		1243935	Upload Photo	Q26536583
Lewins	II	Crockham Hill			13 January 1995	TQ4425550314; 51°14′02″N 0°03′53″E		1272467	Upload Photo	Q26562300
Pootings Road	II	Crockham Hill			10 September 1954	TQ4485750121; 51°13′55″N 0°04′24″E		1272620	Upload Photo	Q26562445
Willy's At Heath	II	Crockham Hill			16 January 1975	TQ4427450540; 51°14′09″N 0°03′55″E		1243994	Upload Photo	Q26536642
Cart Shed And Granary To South West Of Crockham Grange Farmhouse	II	Crockham Hill, Crockham Grange			16 January 1975	TQ4495150024; 51°13′52″N 0°04′29″E		1243938	Upload Photo	Q26536586
Crockham Grange	II	Crockham Hill, Crockham Grange			10 September 1954	TQ4486050012; 51°13′51″N 0°04′24″E		1243937	Upload Photo	Q26536585
Crockham House	II*	Crockham Hill, Crockham House			10 September 1954	TQ4461752030; 51°14′57″N 0°04′15″E		1272646	Upload Photo	Q17545825
Oasthouse To West Of Crockham House	II	Crockham Hill, Crockham House			10 September 1954	TQ4459652042; 51°14′57″N 0°04′14″E		1243992	Upload Photo	Q26536640
Two Cottages To North Of Hurst Farmhouse	II	Crockham Hill, Hurst Farm			16 January 1975	TQ4333950304; 51°14′02″N 0°03′06″E		1243940	Upload Photo	Q26536588
1, Croydon Road	II*	1, Croydon Road			10 September 1954	TQ4444353970; 51°16′00″N 0°04′08″E		1244079	Upload Photo	Q17545639
Hurst Farmhouse	II	Dairy Lane, Crockham Hill			16 January 1975	TQ4334750233; 51°14′00″N 0°03′07″E		1272621	Upload Photo	Q26562446
Old Dairy Farmhouse	II	Dairy Lane, Crockham Hill			16 January 1975	TQ4362850122; 51°13′56″N 0°03′21″E		1243939	Upload Photo	Q26536587
Duncan's Cottages	II	3-6, Duncan's Yard			16 January 1975	TQ4453554087; 51°16′03″N 0°04′13″E		1243949	Upload Photo	Q26536597
Earlylands	II	Edenbridge Road, Earlylands			16 January 1975	TQ4388349347; 51°13′31″N 0°03′33″E		1243981	Upload Photo	Q26536629
Earlylands Cottage	II	Edenbridge Road, Earlylands			16 January 1975	TQ4380049117; 51°13′23″N 0°03′28″E		1243930	Upload Photo	Q26536578
Barn At Redland Farm To North Of Redlands House	II	Edenbridge Road, Redlands			16 January 1975	TQ4402349799; 51°13′45″N 0°03′41″E		1243931	Upload Photo	Q26536579
Boundary Walls To Garden Shared By Little Rosings (modern Bungalow) And Old Rosings	II	Farley Lane			16 January 1975	TQ4400953703; 51°15′51″N 0°03′46″E		1244011	Upload Photo	Q26536659
Apple Tree Cottage	II	French Street			16 January 1975	TQ4586452739; 51°15′19″N 0°05′20″E		1243941	Upload Photo	Q26536589
April Cottage	II	French Street			16 January 1975	TQ4588252749; 51°15′19″N 0°05′21″E		1272623	Upload Photo	Q26562448
Frenchstreet House	II	French Street			16 January 1975	TQ4598952513; 51°15′11″N 0°05′26″E		1272622	Upload Photo	Q26562447
Buttles Steps Cottage	II	Froghole Lane, Froghole			16 January 1975	TQ4485750970; 51°14′22″N 0°04′25″E		1243942	Upload Photo	Q26536590
Froghole Farmhouse	II	Froghole Lane, Froghole			16 January 1975	TQ4484451107; 51°14′27″N 0°04′25″E		1243999	Upload Photo	Q26536647
Ivy Cottage	II	Froghole Lane, Froghole			16 January 1975	TQ4491950973; 51°14′22″N 0°04′29″E		1243943	Upload Photo	Q26536591
Oast Houses At Froghole Farm	II	Froghole Lane, Froghole			10 July 1985	TQ4480051177; 51°14′29″N 0°04′23″E		1244187	Upload Photo	Q26536819
3, Fuller's Hill	II	3, Fuller's Hill			16 January 1975	TQ4458454120; 51°16′04″N 0°04′16″E		1272591	Upload Photo	Q26562417
The Manse At Westerham Congregational Church	II	Fuller's Hill			16 January 1975	TQ4454854064; 51°16′03″N 0°04′14″E		1243950	Upload Photo	Q26536598
Westerham Congregational Church	II	Fuller's Hill			16 January 1975	TQ4453854078; 51°16′03″N 0°04′14″E		1243951	Westerham Congregational Church More images	Q26536599
Gaysham Farmhouse	II	Gaysham			16 January 1975	TQ4311855467; 51°16′49″N 0°03′02″E		1272582	Upload Photo	Q26562408
Gazebo About 330 Yards West Of Squerryes Court On Top Of Hill At Other Side Of Road	II	Goodley Stock			10 September 1954	TQ4379953378; 51°15′41″N 0°03′34″E		1244015	Upload Photo	Q26536663
Memorial Stone Urn South West Of Squerryes Court	II	Goodley Stock			10 September 1954	TQ4407953305; 51°15′39″N 0°03′49″E		1244012	Upload Photo	Q26536660
Orchard House	II	Goodley Stock			16 January 1975	TQ4375053288; 51°15′38″N 0°03′32″E		1244016	Upload Photo	Q26536664
Squerryes Court	I	Goodley Stock			10 September 1954	TQ4411453406; 51°15′42″N 0°03′51″E		1272592	Upload Photo	Q7582234
Stable Buildings To South West Of Squerryes Court Including Stable Flat And Stable Cottage	II	Goodley Stock			16 January 1975	TQ4398353338; 51°15′40″N 0°03′44″E		1244014	Upload Photo	Q26536662
Spencely House	II	Goodley Stock Road, Crockham Hill, Edenbridge, TN8 6TA			23 January 2023	TQ4380951983; 51°14′56″N 0°03′33″E		1483893	Upload Photo	Q122214030
Brewery Cottages	II	1-4, High Street			10 September 1954	TQ4431453734; 51°15′52″N 0°04′01″E		1272596	Upload Photo	Q26562421
Farthing Cottage	II	24, High Street			7 July 1989	TQ4434153864; 51°15′56″N 0°04′03″E		1244253	Upload Photo	Q26536882
49 And 51, High Street	II*	49 And 51, High Street			10 September 1954	TQ4441053884; 51°15′57″N 0°04′07″E		1272573	Upload Photo	Q17545813
53 And 55, High Street	II	53 And 55, High Street			16 January 1975	TQ4440353877; 51°15′57″N 0°04′06″E		1244031	Upload Photo	Q26536677
Old Rose House	II	65, High Street			16 January 1975	TQ4437053864; 51°15′56″N 0°04′05″E		1272574	Upload Photo	Q26562401
No 101 Including Former Stables	II	101, High Street			10 September 1954	TQ4433653712; 51°15′51″N 0°04′03″E		1244032	Upload Photo	Q26536678
Brewery House	II	High Street			26 February 1986	TQ4428153726; 51°15′52″N 0°04′00″E		1244195	Upload Photo	Q26536827
Brook House	II	High Street			16 January 1975	TQ4412953674; 51°15′50″N 0°03′52″E		1244099	Upload Photo	Q26536739
Corner Cottage	II	High Street			10 September 1954	TQ4446553961; 51°15′59″N 0°04′10″E		1244030	Upload Photo	Q26536676
Farley	II*	High Street			10 September 1954	TQ4403753683; 51°15′51″N 0°03′47″E		1272571	Upload Photo	Q17545806
Garden Wall To South Of Farley And Wolfelands And Continuing East In Front Of The Next Property	II	High Street			16 January 1975	TQ4408853681; 51°15′51″N 0°03′50″E		1244029	Upload Photo	Q26536675
Great Moretons	II	High Street			10 September 1954	TQ4415853704; 51°15′51″N 0°03′53″E		1272553	Upload Photo	Q26562384
Moreton Cottage	II	High Street			10 September 1954	TQ4419453705; 51°15′51″N 0°03′55″E		1272597	Upload Photo	Q26562422
Park Cottage	II	High Street			16 January 1975	TQ4410753670; 51°15′50″N 0°03′51″E		1244033	Upload Photo	Q26536679
Pitts Cottage	II	High Street			10 September 1954	TQ4412753696; 51°15′51″N 0°03′52″E		1244027	Upload Photo	Q26536673
Spring Ardens	II	High Street			16 January 1975	TQ4422853710; 51°15′52″N 0°03′57″E		1244080	Upload Photo	Q26536722
Springfield Cottage	II	High Street			16 January 1975	TQ4411053698; 51°15′51″N 0°03′51″E		1244028	Upload Photo	Q26536674
Winterton House	II	High Street			16 January 1975	TQ4453153997; 51°16′01″N 0°04′13″E		1272572	Upload Photo	Q26562400
Former General Wolfe Inn	II	High Street, TN16 1RQ			10 September 1954	TQ4421053720; 51°15′52″N 0°03′56″E		1244026	Upload Photo	Q26536672
Horns Hill Lodge	II	Horns Hill			16 January 1975	TQ4508352152; 51°15′00″N 0°04′39″E		1272624	Upload Photo	Q26562449
Chart's Edge Cottages	II	1 And 2, Hosey Common			16 January 1975	TQ4521753202; 51°15′34″N 0°04′47″E		1272575	Upload Photo	Q26562402
Little Stakes	II	Hosey Hill			8 April 1974	TQ4497453964; 51°15′59″N 0°04′36″E		1244034	Upload Photo	Q26536680
Stakes Edge	II	Hosey Hill			16 January 1975	TQ4497453965; 51°15′59″N 0°04′36″E		1272539	Upload Photo	Q26562370
Keeper's Cottage	II	Hosey Lane, Puddledock			16 January 1975	TQ4618651033; 51°14′23″N 0°05′34″E		1244009	Upload Photo	Q26536657
Dovecote South West Of Squerryes Court	II	In Grounds Of Squerryes Home Farm, Goodley Stock			10 September 1954	TQ4401653285; 51°15′38″N 0°03′45″E		1244013	Upload Photo	Q26536661
The Old House	II	Kent Hatch			10 September 1954	TQ4379451628; 51°14′45″N 0°03′32″E		1244002	Upload Photo	Q26536650
3 And 4, Lodge Lane	II	3 And 4, Lodge Lane			16 January 1975	TQ4449753928; 51°15′58″N 0°04′11″E		1244037	Upload Photo	Q26536683
Bank Cottage	II	Lodge Lane			16 January 1975	TQ4450753922; 51°15′58″N 0°04′12″E		1244112	Upload Photo	Q26536752
Bibury	II	Lodge Lane			16 January 1975	TQ4448653966; 51°16′00″N 0°04′11″E		1244111	Upload Photo	Q26536751
Carter's Cross	II	Lodge Lane			16 January 1975	TQ4447353949; 51°15′59″N 0°04′10″E		1272540	Upload Photo	Q26562371
Squerryes Lodge	II*	Lodge Lane			10 September 1954	TQ4459853890; 51°15′57″N 0°04′16″E		1244038	Upload Photo	Q17545633
Tudor Cottage	II	Lodge Lane			16 January 1975	TQ4446853957; 51°15′59″N 0°04′10″E		1244035	Upload Photo	Q26536681
Wall Along Entrance Drive To Squerryes Lodge	II	Lodge Lane			16 January 1975	TQ4456053894; 51°15′57″N 0°04′14″E		1272542	Upload Photo	Q26562373
White House	II	Lodge Lane			16 January 1975	TQ4448353939; 51°15′59″N 0°04′11″E		1244036	Upload Photo	Q26536682
Squerryes Lodge	II	Lodge Lane, TN16 1RJ			25 July 2022	TQ4452953871; 51°15′56″N 0°04′13″E		1474011	Upload Photo	Q122213531
3-9, London Road	II	3-9, London Road			16 January 1975	TQ4458854147; 51°16′05″N 0°04′16″E		1244040	Upload Photo	Q26536685
43 And 45, London Road	II	43 And 45, London Road			16 January 1975	TQ4470654283; 51°16′10″N 0°04′23″E		1244116	Upload Photo	Q26536756
Corner Cottage	II	London Road			16 January 1975	TQ4458654096; 51°16′04″N 0°04′16″E		1244039	Upload Photo	Q26680925
Court Lodge	II*	London Road			10 September 1954	TQ4464054637; 51°16′21″N 0°04′20″E		1272576	Upload Photo	Q17545819
Lych Gate And Front Wall To Moreton Almshouses	II	London Road			16 January 1975	TQ4471254243; 51°16′08″N 0°04′23″E		1244041	Upload Photo	Q26536686
Moreton Almshouses	II	London Road			16 January 1975	TQ4472554229; 51°16′08″N 0°04′23″E		1272543	Upload Photo	Q26562374
Pollards Cottage	II	Mapleton Road, Mapleton			16 January 1975	TQ4596649994; 51°13′50″N 0°05′21″E		1243944	Upload Photo	Q26536592
Close Farmhouse	II	Mariners Hill			16 January 1975	TQ4498150680; 51°14′13″N 0°04′31″E		1243945	Upload Photo	Q26536593
Front Garden Wall To Mariners	II	Mariners Hill			16 January 1975	TQ4532451120; 51°14′27″N 0°04′50″E		1272584	Upload Photo	Q26562410
Mariners	II	Mariners Hill			10 September 1954	TQ4529051140; 51°14′27″N 0°04′48″E		1244005	Upload Photo	Q26536653
Steps And Gates To West Of Mariners	II	Mariners Hill			16 January 1975	TQ4526951112; 51°14′27″N 0°04′47″E		1243946	Upload Photo	Q26536594
Chartwell	I	Mariners Hill, Chartwell			16 January 1975	TQ4550451523; 51°14′40″N 0°05′00″E		1272626	Chartwell More images	Q1067909
Forecourt Wall To West Of Chartwell	II	Mariners Hill, Chartwell			16 January 1975	TQ4549251523; 51°14′40″N 0°04′59″E		1244007	Upload Photo	Q26536655
Oast Houses And Drying Shed At Chartwell Farm	II	Mariners Hill, Chartwell Farm			16 January 1975	TQ4560951387; 51°14′35″N 0°05′05″E		1243947	Upload Photo	Q26536595
The Farm Shop	II	12, Market Square			16 January 1975	TQ4457354052; 51°16′02″N 0°04′15″E		1272577	Upload Photo	Q26562403
Brunswick House	II	16, Market Square			16 January 1975	TQ4456554056; 51°16′02″N 0°04′15″E		1244119	Upload Photo	Q26536759
18, Market Square	II	18, Market Square			16 January 1975	TQ4455154054; 51°16′02″N 0°04′14″E		1244121	Upload Photo	Q26536761
18a, Market Square	II	18a, Market Square			16 January 1975	TQ4454854050; 51°16′02″N 0°04′14″E		1244043	Upload Photo	Q26536688
2 And 4, Market Square	II	2 And 4, Market Square			10 September 1954	TQ4462554050; 51°16′02″N 0°04′18″E		1272544	Upload Photo	Q26562375
22, Market Square	II	22, Market Square			16 January 1975	TQ4454254039; 51°16′02″N 0°04′14″E		1272578	Upload Photo	Q26562404
24, Market Square	II	24, Market Square			16 January 1975	TQ4453054039; 51°16′02″N 0°04′13″E		1244122	Upload Photo	Q26536762
26 And 28, Market Square	II	26 And 28, Market Square			10 September 1954	TQ4452054032; 51°16′02″N 0°04′13″E		1244044	Upload Photo	Q26536689
7, Market Square	II	7, Market Square			16 January 1975	TQ4463754015; 51°16′01″N 0°04′19″E		1244124	Upload Photo	Q26536764
9, Market Square	II	9, Market Square			16 January 1975	TQ4462754015; 51°16′01″N 0°04′18″E		1272579	Upload Photo	Q26562405
The George And Dragon Hotel	II	Market Square			10 September 1954	TQ4459754063; 51°16′03″N 0°04′17″E		1244042	Upload Photo	Q26536687
The King's Arms Hotel	II	Market Square			10 September 1954	TQ4459454011; 51°16′01″N 0°04′16″E		1244045	The King's Arms Hotel More images	Q26536690
Two K6 Telephone Kiosks	II	Market Square			11 January 1989	TQ4458554043; 51°16′02″N 0°04′16″E		1244252	Upload Photo	Q26536881
Mill Cottage	II	Mill Lane			16 January 1975	TQ4439053713; 51°15′51″N 0°04′05″E		1244127	Upload Photo	Q26536767
Dale Cottages	II	1 And 2, Mill Street			16 January 1975	TQ4488353994; 51°16′00″N 0°04′31″E		1272547	Upload Photo	Q26562378
Grosvenor House Cottages	II	Mill Street			16 January 1975	TQ4488254002; 51°16′00″N 0°04′31″E		1244046	Upload Photo	Q26536691
Church Of Holy Trinity	II	Oakdale Lane, Crockham Hill			10 September 1954	TQ4442450719; 51°14′15″N 0°04′03″E		1243936	Upload Photo	Q85767100
Rysted With Attached Garage, Fuel Stores, Pergola, Terrace Walling, Gatepiers And Gates	II	Pilgrims Way			21 July 1998	TQ4301655827; 51°17′01″N 0°02′58″E		1375719	Upload Photo	Q26656471
Coakham Farmhouse	II	Pootings			16 January 1975	TQ4468249570; 51°13′37″N 0°04′14″E		1272586	Upload Photo	Q26562412
Pootings Manor	II	Pootings			16 January 1975	TQ4543149102; 51°13′21″N 0°04′52″E		1272627	Upload Photo	Q26562451
The Old Cottage	II	Pootings			16 January 1975	TQ4542349125; 51°13′22″N 0°04′52″E		1243948	Upload Photo	Q26536596
Quebec Cottages	II	1-5, Quebec Square			16 January 1975	TQ4492354008; 51°16′01″N 0°04′33″E		1244136	Upload Photo	Q26536775
Quebec House	I	Quebec Square			10 September 1954	TQ4492254053; 51°16′02″N 0°04′33″E		1244133	Upload Photo	Q7269776
Cottage Behind Quebec House To The North	II	Quebec Square			16 January 1975	TQ4491654074; 51°16′03″N 0°04′33″E		1244134	Upload Photo	Q26536773
Front Garden Wall To South Of Quebec House	II	Quebec Square			16 January 1975	TQ4493854041; 51°16′02″N 0°04′34″E		1272529	Upload Photo	Q26562361
Westerham Lodge	II	Quebec Square			16 January 1975	TQ4495954014; 51°16′01″N 0°04′35″E		1244135	Upload Photo	Q26536774
The Old House	II	Quebec Square, Kent, TN16 1TD			10 September 1954	TQ4489554038; 51°16′02″N 0°04′32″E		1272531	Upload Photo	Q26562363
1-4, Squerryes Park Cottages	II	1-4, Squerryes Park Cottages, Goodley Stock Road, TN16 1RD			16 January 1975	TQ4403553631; 51°15′49″N 0°03′47″E		1244102	Upload Photo	Q26536742
1, The Green	II	1, The Green			16 January 1975	TQ4464554048; 51°16′02″N 0°04′19″E		1244017	Upload Photo	Q26536665
10, The Green	II	10, The Green			10 September 1954	TQ4471054059; 51°16′02″N 0°04′22″E		1272593	Upload Photo	Q26562418
11, The Green	II	11, The Green			10 September 1954	TQ4471554061; 51°16′02″N 0°04′23″E		1244022	Upload Photo	Q26536670
12, The Green	II	12, The Green			10 September 1954	TQ4471954062; 51°16′02″N 0°04′23″E		1244069	Upload Photo	Q26536712
13, The Green	II	13, The Green			10 September 1954	TQ4472454064; 51°16′03″N 0°04′23″E		1272594	Upload Photo	Q26562419
Kirkgate Cottage	II	14, The Green			10 September 1954	TQ4472854064; 51°16′02″N 0°04′23″E		1244073	Upload Photo	Q26536716
Church Gate House	II	15, The Green			10 September 1954	TQ4473554069; 51°16′03″N 0°04′24″E		1244023	Upload Photo	Q26536671
16, The Green	II	16, The Green			16 January 1975	TQ4474454048; 51°16′02″N 0°04′24″E		1272595	Upload Photo	Q26562420
2, The Green	II	2, The Green			16 January 1975	TQ4465354044; 51°16′02″N 0°04′19″E		1244018	Upload Photo	Q26536666
Yew Tree Cottage	II	22, The Green			5 November 1990	TQ4474754010; 51°16′01″N 0°04′24″E		1244259	Upload Photo	Q26536888
3, The Green	II	3, The Green			16 January 1975	TQ4465854046; 51°16′02″N 0°04′20″E		1244019	Upload Photo	Q26536667
9, The Green	II	9, The Green			10 September 1954	TQ4470354057; 51°16′02″N 0°04′22″E		1272570	Upload Photo	Q26562399
Church Of St Mary The Virgin	II*	The Green			10 September 1954	TQ4475954083; 51°16′03″N 0°04′25″E		1244024	Church Of St Mary The Virgin More images	Q17545624
Cobbled Courtyard At Back Of Church Gate House And East Boundary Wall	II	The Green			16 January 1975	TQ4472754075; 51°16′03″N 0°04′23″E		1244074	Upload Photo	Q26536717
Cottage In Yard To Rear Of The Grasshopper Inn And Wall Linking Cottage With Inn	II	The Green			16 January 1975	TQ4466954062; 51°16′02″N 0°04′20″E		1272569	Upload Photo	Q26562398
Statue Of General Wolfe	II*	The Green			10 September 1954	TQ4466854028; 51°16′01″N 0°04′20″E		1244025	Upload Photo	Q17545629
Statue Of Sir Winston Churchill	II	The Green			16 January 1975	TQ4471354035; 51°16′02″N 0°04′23″E		1272558	Upload Photo	Q26562389
The Grasshopper Inn	II	The Green			16 January 1975	TQ4467354052; 51°16′02″N 0°04′20″E		1244020	Upload Photo	Q26536668
West Wall On Boundary Of Property Of Grasshopper Inn	II	The Green			16 January 1975	TQ4466954074; 51°16′03″N 0°04′20″E		1244021	Upload Photo	Q26536669
Churchyard Of The Church Of St Mary	II	The Green, Kent, TN16 1AS			12 September 2018	TQ4477554068; 51°16′03″N 0°04′26″E		1458814	Upload Photo	Q66479881
The Tower	II	Tower Wood			16 January 1975	TQ4487352621; 51°15′16″N 0°04′29″E		1272628	Upload Photo	Q26562452
Lockyer Place	II	1 And 2, Vicarage Hill			10 September 1954	TQ4489854016; 51°16′01″N 0°04′32″E		1272537	Upload Photo	Q26562368
Wolfe Cottages	II	1-4, Vicarage Hill			10 September 1954	TQ4485554010; 51°16′01″N 0°04′30″E		1244155	Upload Photo	Q26536789
Bank Flat	II	Vicarage Hill			27 July 1993	TQ4467054006; 51°16′01″N 0°04′20″E		1244281	Upload Photo	Q26536910
Church Cottage	II	Vicarage Hill			16 January 1975	TQ4481254059; 51°16′02″N 0°04′28″E		1244138	Upload Photo	Q26536776
Copthall Cottage	II	Vicarage Hill			10 September 1954	TQ4483254003; 51°16′00″N 0°04′29″E		1244141	Upload Photo	Q26536778
Darenth Cottage	II*	Vicarage Hill			10 September 1954	TQ4487154046; 51°16′02″N 0°04′31″E		1244137	Upload Photo	Q17545644
Former Barn To Rear Of The London Arts Vaults And Exchange Limited	II	Vicarage Hill			27 July 1993	TQ4466353992; 51°16′00″N 0°04′20″E		1272455	Upload Photo	Q26562288
Garden Wall To South West Of The Vicarage	II	Vicarage Hill			16 January 1975	TQ4476453962; 51°15′59″N 0°04′25″E		1244153	Upload Photo	Q26536788
Grosvenor House	II*	Vicarage Hill			10 September 1954	TQ4488254014; 51°16′01″N 0°04′31″E		1244143	Upload Photo	Q17545653
Monks Way Cottage	II	Vicarage Hill			16 January 1975	TQ4475253990; 51°16′00″N 0°04′24″E		1244151	Upload Photo	Q26536786
Old Forge Cottage	II	Vicarage Hill			16 January 1975	TQ4483754047; 51°16′02″N 0°04′29″E		1272532	Upload Photo	Q26562364
The Breaches	II	Vicarage Hill			10 September 1954	TQ4473653971; 51°15′59″N 0°04′24″E		1244150	Upload Photo	Q26536785
The Pheasantry	II	Vicarage Hill			10 September 1954	TQ4468553998; 51°16′00″N 0°04′21″E		1244139	Upload Photo	Q26536777
The Red Cow House	II	Vicarage Hill			10 September 1954	TQ4484354007; 51°16′01″N 0°04′29″E		1244142	Upload Photo	Q26536779
The Vicarage And Vicarage Flat Above	II*	Vicarage Hill			10 September 1954	TQ4477553979; 51°16′00″N 0°04′26″E		1244140	Upload Photo	Q17545649
Outer Garden Walls To North	II	West And South Of Westerham Lodge, Quebec Square			16 January 1975	TQ4494754035; 51°16′01″N 0°04′35″E		1272530	Upload Photo	Q26562362
Betsoms Hill Farmhouse	II	Westerham Hill, Betsoms Hill			16 January 1975	TQ4415455804; 51°16′59″N 0°03′56″E		1243933	Upload Photo	Q26536581
Former Threshing Barn To South West Of Little Bettsoms Hill Farmhouse	II	Westerham Hill, Bettsoms Hill			16 January 1975	TQ4308756291; 51°17′16″N 0°03′02″E		1243932	Upload Photo	Q26536580
Little Bettsoms Hill Farmhouse	II	Westerham Hill, Bettsoms Hill			16 January 1975	TQ4311156315; 51°17′17″N 0°03′03″E		1243983	Upload Photo	Q26536631
Force Green Farm Cottage	II	Westerham Hill, Force Green			16 January 1975	TQ4480655361; 51°16′44″N 0°04′29″E		1243934	Upload Photo	Q26536582
Force Green Farmhouse	II	Westerham Hill, Force Green			16 January 1975	TQ4483355314; 51°16′43″N 0°04′31″E		1243984	Upload Photo	Q26536632
Covers Farmhouse	II	Westerham Road, Covers Farm			10 September 1954	TQ4336153704; 51°15′52″N 0°03′12″E		1243989	Upload Photo	Q26536637

== See also ==
- Grade I listed buildings in Kent
- Grade II* listed buildings in Kent

== Sources ==
- Newman, John (2012) [1969], Kent: West and the Weald, The Buildings of England, New Haven and London: Yale University Press, ISBN 978-0-300-18509-6
