= Westerham =

Town and civil parish in Kent, England

Coordinates: 51.27134°N 0.07005°E

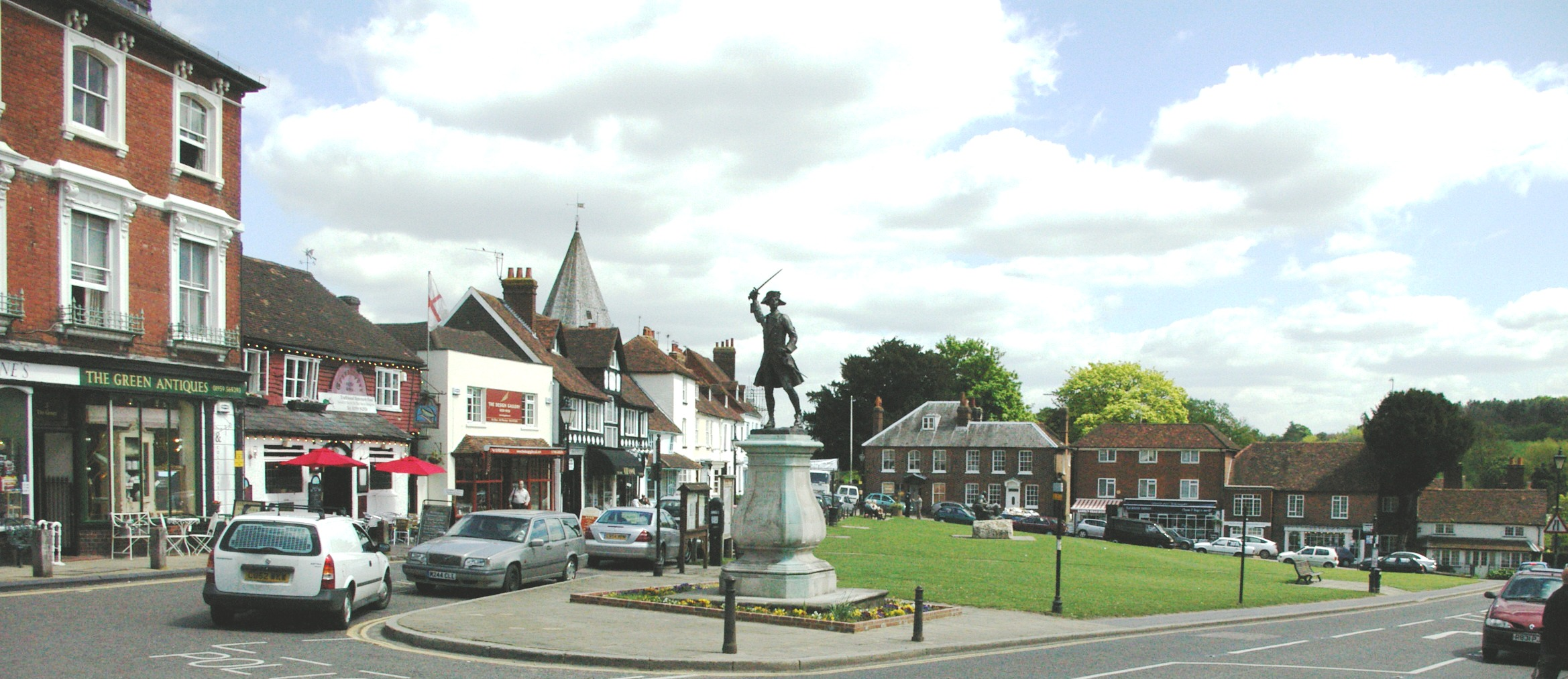
- A view across Westerham Green

- Location within Kent
- Population: 4,498 (2021)
- OS grid reference: TQ445545
- Civil parish: Westerham
- District: Sevenoaks
- Shire county: Kent
- Region: South East
- Country: England
- Sovereign state: United Kingdom
- Post town: WESTERHAM
- Postcode district: TN16
- Dialling code: 01959
- Police: Kent
- Fire: Kent
- Ambulance: South East Coast
- UK Parliament: Sevenoaks

Westerham is a town and civil parish in the Sevenoaks District of Kent, England. It is located 3.4 miles east of Oxted and 6 miles west of Sevenoaks, adjacent to the Kent border with both Greater London and Surrey. It is recorded as early as the 9th century, and was mentioned in the Domesday Book of 1086 in a Norman form, Oistreham (compare Ouistreham in Normandy, Oistreham in 1086). Hām is Old English for a village or homestead, and so Westerham means a westerly homestead. The River Darent flows through the town, and formerly powered three watermills. The total population in 2021 was 4,498.

== History ==
View of Westerham, Kent ca. 1831, from W. H. Ireland's History of Kent.

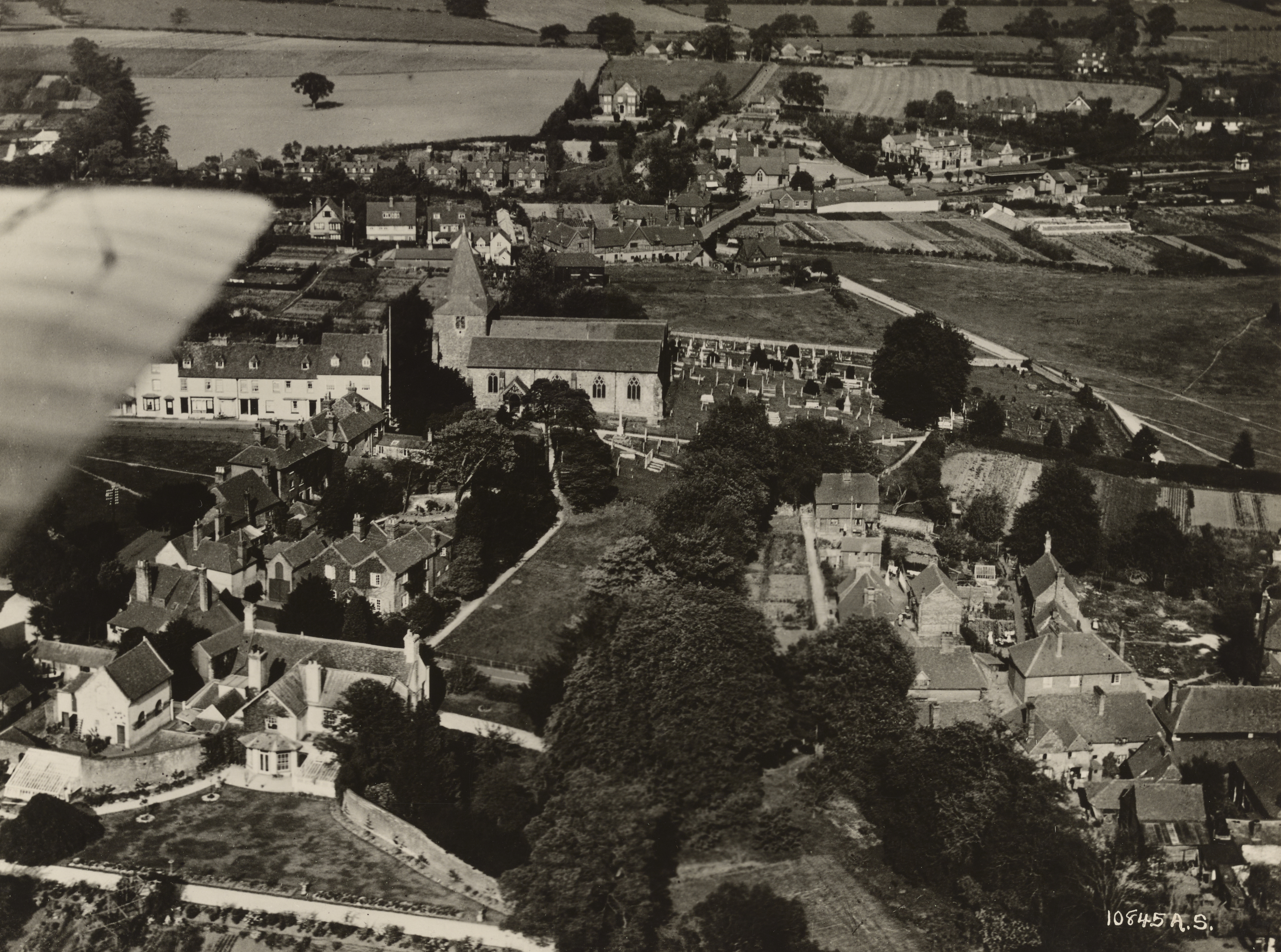
View of the Church, 1922

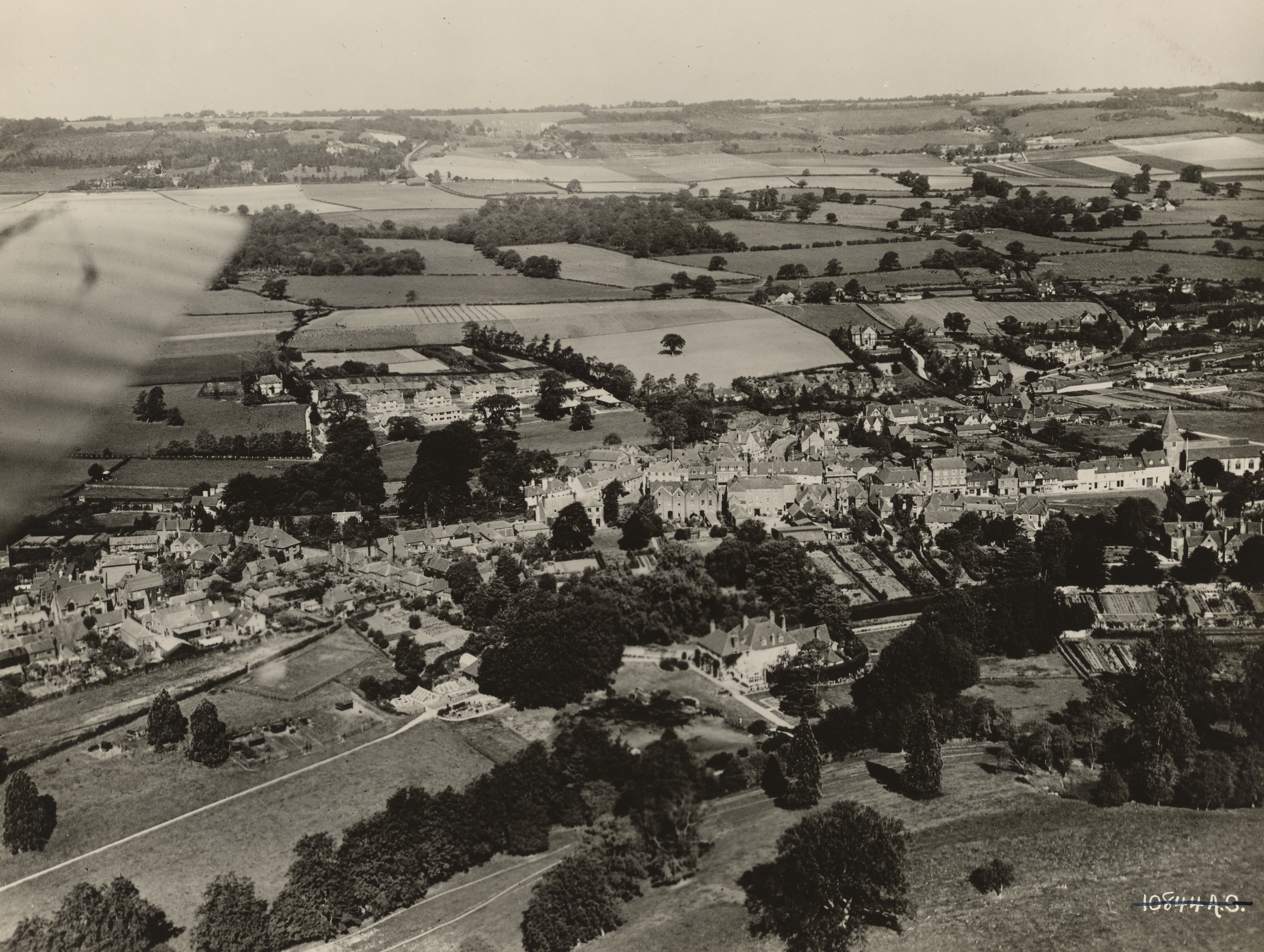
View of the Town, 1922

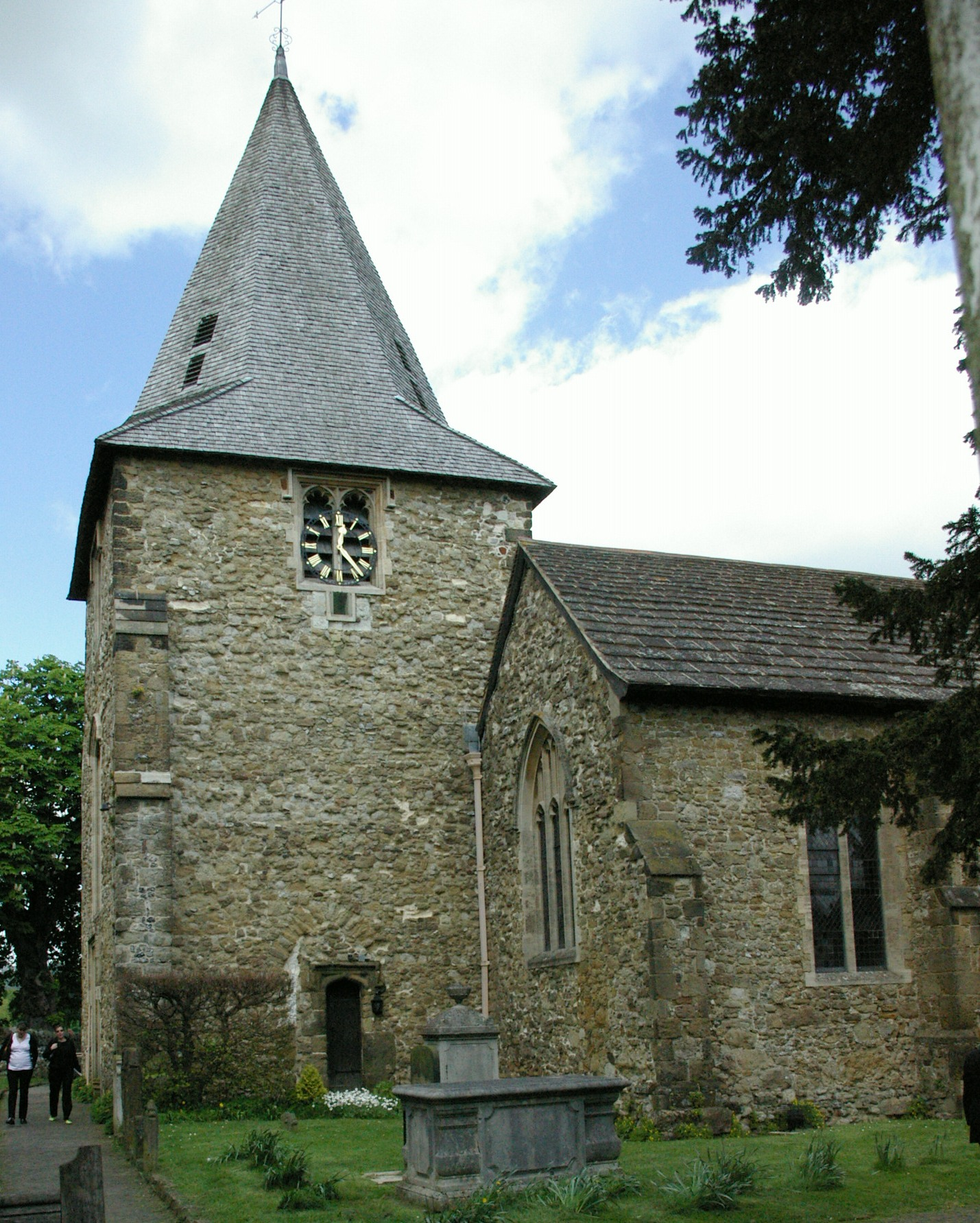
Church of St Mary the Virgin

There is evidence that the area around Westerham has been settled for thousands of years: finds such as a Celtic fortification (c 2000 BC) and a Roman road are close by, along with the remains of a Roman encampment just past the ruins of a tower south of the town at the summit of Tower Woods.

The tower dates back to the 18th century, and was originally constructed by the owners of Squerryes Court as a folly for their children's amusement.

The manor was originally run by Godwin, Earl of Wessex and later by his son Harold Godwinson the last Saxon King of England. The first Norman lord of Westerham was Eustace II of Boulogne, and the town appears in the Domesday Book as Oistreham. By 1227 Henry III granted Westerham a market charter, making the new village a major player in the buying and selling of cattle in Kent, a tradition that survived to 1961 when the last cattle market was held. St Mary's Church is thought to date from the 13th century, although it was much altered in Victorian times. In 1503 the Protestant martyr John Frith was born in the town.

The church is unusual in that it displays the only known representation of a royal arms of King Edward VI (reigned 1547–1553) in a church. There is little doubt that it is the king's arms as the supporters are a lion and a dragon, and there is a curious Latin phrase beside the arms: "VIVAT REX CURAT LEX" (Long live the King, custodian of the law). England did not have another male monarch until the Union of the Crowns in 1603.

In 1596, there was a peculiar subsidence of a hill measuring 80 by 28 perches, which was transformed into a dale.

James Wolfe was born in the town in 1727 at what is now known as the Old Vicarage due to a terrible storm on the night he was born. He lived in Quebec House—many streets and buildings are named after him and St Mary's contains not only the font in which he was baptised but also a memorial window to him by Edward Burne-Jones. The town square contains statues to both Wolfe and Churchill.

Interior and exterior scenes for the 2009 BBC mini-series Emma were shot at Squerryes Court with the house appearing as Emma Woodhouse's home Hartfield, while exterior scenes were shot at Chilham, Kent.

Alice Liddell, cited as the inspiration for Lewis Carroll's children's book Alice's Adventures in Wonderland, lived in the vicarage for a brief period. Alice rented 'The Breaches' not long before she died, but when she became very ill she went to stay with her sister Rhoda at Hoseyrigge in Westerham. She was born in Westminster, and when she died aged 82 a memorial service was held for her at St Mary's Church. She was not buried in Westerham.

Record producer Brian Higgins, whose Xenomania production team produced hit singles and albums for artists such as Girls Aloud, Kylie Minogue, Sugababes, Pet Shop Boys, Texas and Franz Ferdinand, now occupy what used to be known as the Old Vicarage.

BBC Children's TV founders Freda Lingstrom and Maria Bird lived together in Westerham and named their production company Westerham Arts which was commissioned by the BBC to create The Woodentops, Andy Pandy and the Flower Pot Men.

During a January 1967 visit to Knole Park in Sevenoaks to shoot a promotional film for Strawberry Fields Forever and Penny Lane, John Lennon stopped at a Westerham antiques shop and purchased a poster for Pablo Fanque's Circus Royal, which later inspired the song, "Being for the Benefit of Mr. Kite!"

As well as the parish church (a Grade II*-listed building), there are a Grade II-listed chapel associated with the Congregational Federation and a Roman Catholic church. Westerham Evangelical Congregational Church dates from 1839 and St John the Baptist's Catholic Parish Church opened in 1955.

== Economy ==
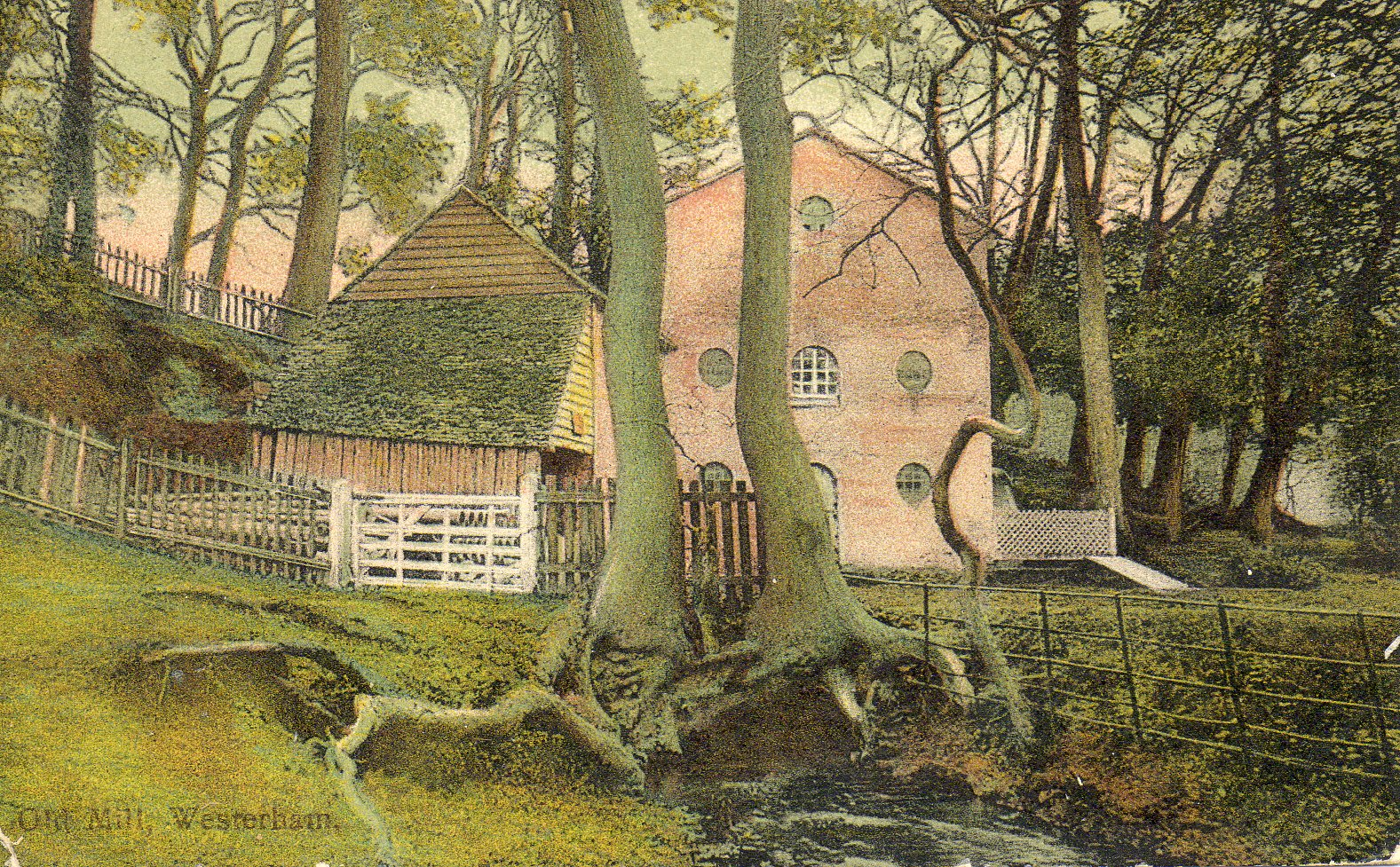
Westerham Mill c. 1912

Westerham was home to the Black Eagle Brewery, which was taken over by Taylor Walker & Co in the 1950s, becoming part of Ind Coope in 1959 and closing in 1965. Yeast from the brewery was preserved at the National Collection of Yeast Cultures and is now used by the present day Westerham Brewery which was established in 2004.

Westerham was home to Crayford Engineering, a successful car conversion company, from 1962 to the 1980s, working from a workshop at Squerryes Mede.

== Chartwell ==
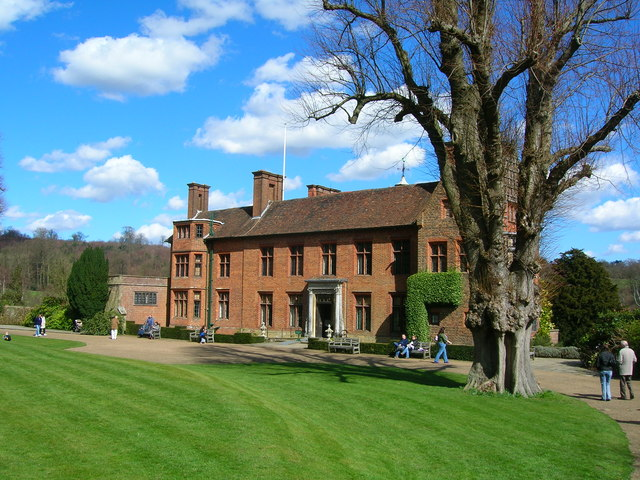
Chartwell House facade, Westerham

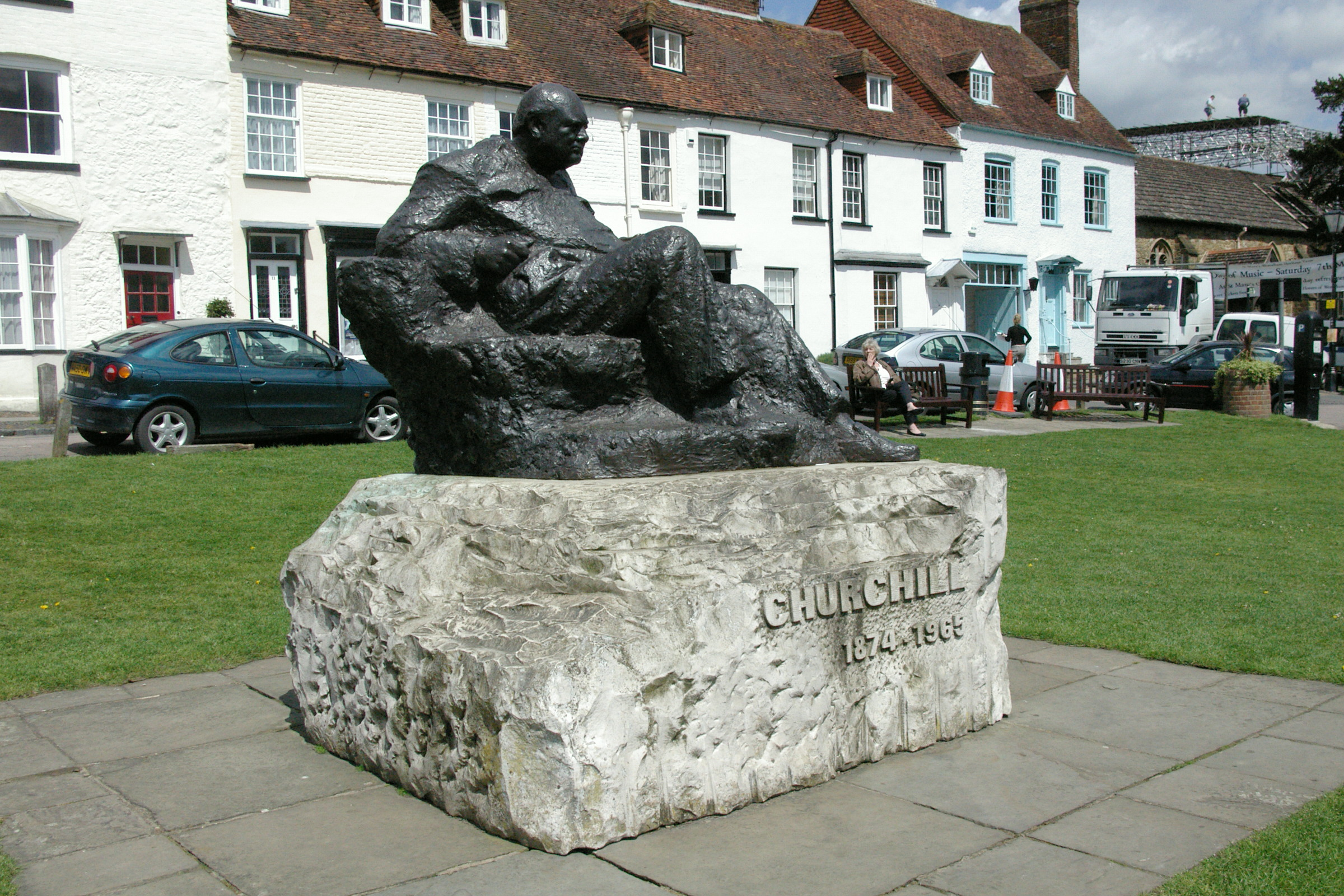
The Churchill statue

In 1922 Winston Churchill MP purchased Chartwell Manor on the outskirts of Westerham, which, apart from the time he spent at 10 Downing Street and 28 Hyde Park Gate (his London home), was his home for the rest of his life. Chartwell is now administered by the National Trust.

There is a statue of Sir Winston Churchill on the village green at Westerham. It was sculpted by Oscar Nemon and stands on a base of Yugoslavian stone, the gift of Marshal Josip Broz Tito.

== Transport ==
=== Rail ===
The nearest National Rail station to Westerham is Oxted station, located 4 miles away.

=== Buses ===
Westerham is served by London Buses route 246, GoBus routes 1 and 401, and Metrobus routes 236, 594 and 595 which provide connections to Bromley, Sevenoaks, Tonbridge, Oxted and East Grinstead. Westerham is also within the operating area of GoBus' demand responsive Go2 Sevenoaks service that allows passengers to order a bus via an app or phone number to destinations in the region including Otford, Pratt's Bottom and Ightham.

=== Roads ===
Westerham lies south of the M25 motorway. The A25 road goes west to Oxted, Redhill and Guildford and east to Sevenoaks and Wrotham. The A233 road goes north to Biggin Hill and Bromley. The B2026 road goes south to Edenbridge.

== Media ==
Since the town is close to London, television signals are received from the Crystal Palace TV transmitter, placing Westerham in the BBC London and ITV London areas. BBC South East and ITV Meridian can also be received from the Bluebell Hill TV transmitter.

Local radio stations are: BBC Radio Kent (96.7 FM), Heart South (103.1 FM), Gold (603 AM) and KMFM West Kent, which broadcasts from its studios in Strood on 96.2 FM.

== In Film ==
London's Country (1952) - (British Transport Films) - narrated by Howard Marion Crawford, reference number: 2016/1859. Morris Dancing shown on Westerham green, before the Winston Churchill statue was erected.

The former Westerham Railway is briefly shown in Look at Life episode, 'Draw the Fires', from 1963.

== Newspapers ==
The town is served by these local newspapers, Westerham County Border News and Sevenoaks Chronicle.

== Local sports clubs ==
Westerham Cricket Club was founded in 1831, folded in 2004 and reformed in 2019. Previous home grounds: 1831 to 1874 Farley Common, Westerham; 1875 to 1987 Squerryes Park, Westerham; 1988 to 2004 Costell's Meadow, Westerham. In 1990, the cricket club invited the football, rugby and netball clubs to join them in forming the Westerham Sports Association (WSA) which secured a grant to build a new clubhouse which opened in 1990 and still exists. The Cricket Club now plays its home matches at Valence Park, a picturesque cricket ground on the outskirts of Westerham.

Sir Winston Churchill Boxing club was located at the Royal Standard Public House (now demolished).

Westerham is also home to a football team, Westerham Football Club, which was founded in 1888. Westerham Junior Football Club provide football for 5-18 year olds playing in the Tandridge and Crowborough leagues. Both clubs are located at King George V Playing Field.

Westerham has two ladies netball teams that compete in the Tunbridge Wells League. Westerham also hosts a weekly parkrun on part of the Squerryes Estate.

== See also ==
- List of places of worship in Sevenoaks (district)
- Listed buildings in Westerham
