= Squerryes Court =

Country house in Westerham, Kent, England

Coordinates: 51.2616°N 0.0641°E

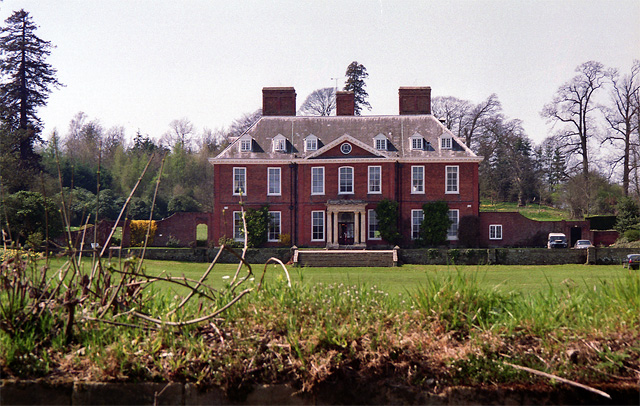
- Interactive map of the Squerryes Court area

General information
- Architectural style: Queen Anne style architecture
- Location: Squerryes, Westerham TN16 1SJ, UK, Westerham, England
- Year built: 1680s
- Owner: Warde family

Technical details
- Size: 2,500 acres

Squerryes Court is a late 17th-century manor house that stands just outside the town of Westerham in Kent. The house, which has been held by the same family for over 280 years, is surrounded by extensive gardens and parkland and is a grade I listed building.

== History ==
The site has been inhabited for at least 800 years. According to the Domesday Book, in 1086 the Manor of Westerham was held by Earl Eustace de Boulogne, granted to him by William the Conqueror. Before that it was held by Earl Godwin under Edward the Confessor.

A substantial timber-framed hall house stood on this site before the present house was built between 1681 and 1685. From before 1272 it was owned by the Squery family, whose arms were A squirrel browsing on a hazelnut, until Sir Thomas Squery died in 1439 without male descendants (however, a John Squery, esquire, of London, son of a deceased Thomas Squery, of Kent, in mentioned in a suit in the court of Common Pleas, in 1446). The property was inherited by his daughter Margaret, who had been married to William Cromer (d. 1434), and on her death in 1448 the estate went to their son, also called William, who died in 1450 during Jack Cade's Rebellion.

The land changed hands many times; in the 1680s, the previous house was torn down and the present house built by Sir Nicholas Crispe. The house is set on a terrace and has a two-storey central block of seven bays under a steep, hipped slate roof with pedimented gables and dormers. It is a compact, oblong house, constructed of mellow orange brick. The original building was built flanked by two small wings forming a forecourt, but these were demolished and replaced in the 19th century. The replacement wings were themselves torn down after the Second World War and only the main block now remains.

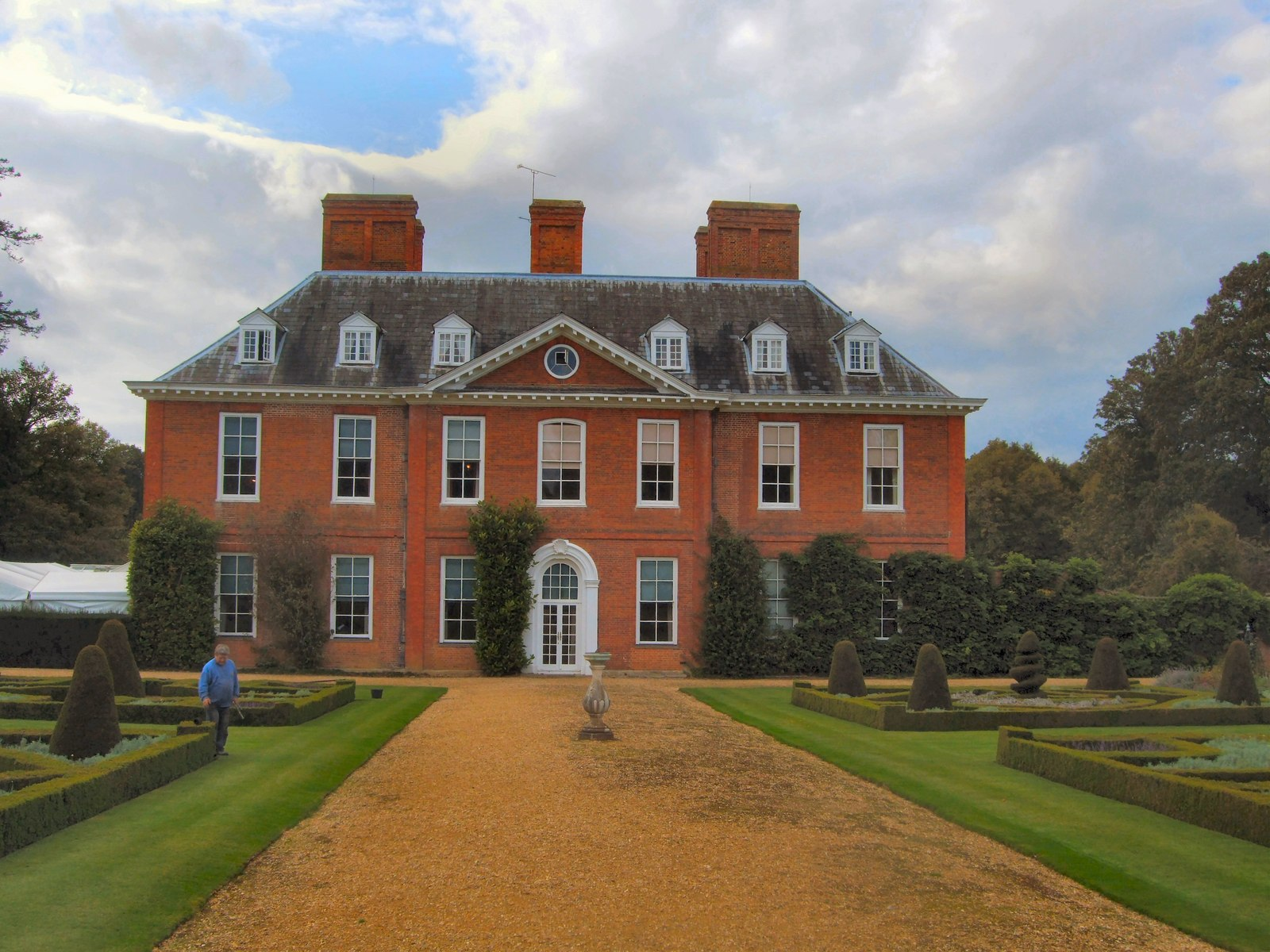
Squerryes Court

In 1700, the property was sold by Sir Nicholas's son to Edward Villiers, 1st Earl of Jersey. The third earl sold it in 1731 to John Warde, whose great uncle Sir Patience Warde had been Lord Mayor of London in 1680. Subsequently, his father also achieved that office as well as becoming one of the first Governors of the Bank of England.

The building, which is in the Queen Anne style, houses a fine collection of Old Master paintings from the Italian, 17th century Dutch and 18th century English schools, together with furniture, porcelain and tapestries, all of which were acquired or commissioned by the family in the 18th century. Items connected with General James Wolfe, victor of the Battle of the Plains of Abraham and a friend of the Warde family, are also on display.

The house and gardens were open to the public for tours from 1952 until September 2012, when the Warde family moved into the house.

== Gardens ==
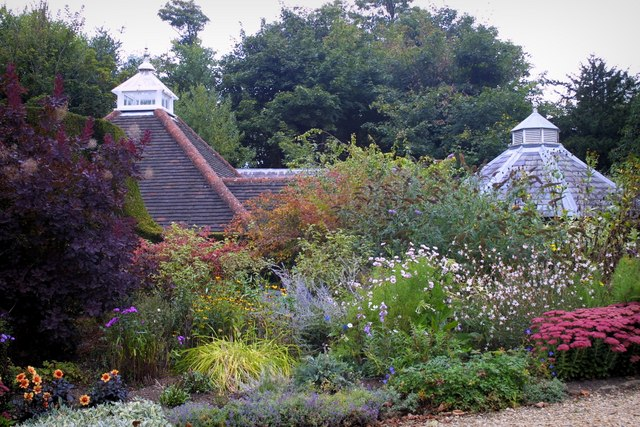
Squerryes Court Gardens

The gardens at Squerryes Court cover some 10 acres (around 4 hectares) and include a dovecote, lake, gazebo, and parterres. Just after the house was built, they were laid out in formal style. When the Warde family acquired the estate in 1731, they reshaped the garden to adhere to the more fashionable natural landscape style. During the Great storm of 1987, 147 trees fell in the garden, after which the Warde family began redesigning the garden in the old formal style based on the original plans and a print dated 1709.

== Estate ==
The Squerryes Estate consists of 2,500 acres and borders Surrey to the west and Greater London to the north.

All the farms on the estate have been amalgamated into a single agricultural unit. There is a 200-head dairy herd which produces milk for Marks & Spencer. The calves are reared on the farm; the Friesian heifers join the herd, while the bull calves and cross-bred heifers are grown for beef using the natural grazing in the park. The arable land produces millet wheat, malting barley, and oilseed rape, together with oats, barley, and beans for the cattle.

One third of the estate is woodland. Almost all of the traditional farm buildings have been restored and converted into offices or workshops, which are let to local businesses. Some farm houses and cottages have been refurbished and let to tenants.

Between 1875 and 1987 (112 years) Squerryes Park was the home of Westerham Cricket Club until the club was asked to relocate by the Warde family. The club was planning to leave the Park in 1990 but the Great Storm in October 1987 caused three large trees to fall on the pavilion and the club had to relocate to King George's Field, Westerham earlier than expected.

== Sparkling wine ==
The Squerryes Estate began planting its vineyards in 2006, and the first vintage was produced in 2010. The label currently sells two styles of sparkling wine: brut and rosé.

== Popular culture ==
Squerryes Court has been used as an exterior and interior location for many films, serving as:

- Hartfield the home of the Woodhouses for the 2009 BBC adaptation of Emma
- the home of minister Dormandy (Kenneth Branagh) in the 2009 film The Boat That Rocked
- the Battle of Agincourt in the 2012 TV film Henry V, part of the BBC series The Hollow Crown
- the home of Henry Beaumont (Robert Hardy) in episode one of Foyle's War, The German Woman.

In 2015, a production of A Midsummer Night's Dream was put on at the house, directed by Ian Hughes and with a cast drawn from classical theatre companies.

Most recently, in 2021 it featured in the ITV comedy drama The Larkins.

== See also ==
- List of tourist attractions in Kent
- List of country houses in the United Kingdom
