= Westerham Brewery =

Brewery in Westerham, Kent, England

- Industry: Alcoholic drinks
- Headquarters: Westerham, Kent, England
- Products: Beer
- Website: www.westerhambrewery.co.uk

The Westerham Brewery Company is a real ale producer in Westerham in Kent that has now moved from Crockham Hill a village a couple of miles to the south, to Beggars Lane in Westerham. Westerham Brewery use locally sourced malt and hops with a stated aim to produce ales with a distinct, traditional flavour. The local hard water, having percolated through the Lower Greensand Ridge to the south of Westerham, is highly rated for the brewing of ales such as the IPA (India Pale Ale) for which Westerham was once famous. Westerham Brewery uses the same yeast as previously used by the Black Eagle Brewery in Westerham until 1965, and follows some of the original brewery recipes. It was founded by Robert Wickes, in 2004. The brewery makes traditional Ale, Stout, pilsner and lager. The Black Eagle Brewery was taken over by 'Taylor Walker & Co'., in the 1950s, became part of 'Ind Coope', in 1959, and closed in 1965. Yeast from the brewery was preserved at the National Collection of Yeast Cultures.

In 2015 Westerham Brewery joined forces with Anno Distillers to make Kent's first malt whisky.
