= HMS Royal Sovereign =

Seven ships of the Royal Navy have been named HMS Royal Sovereign, while another was planned but renamed before being launched:

- English ship Sovereign of the Seas was a 102-gun first rate ship of the line launched in 1637. She was renamed Sovereign in 1650 and Royal Sovereign in 1660. Burnt by accident in 1697.
- HMS Royal Sovereign (1701) was a 100-gun first-rate launched in 1701. She underwent a "great repair" (1722–1725) so extensive that the result might be considered a new ship. She was finally broken up in 1768.
- HMS Royal Sovereign (1786) was a 100-gun first-rate launched in 1786. She was at the Battle of Trafalgar, renamed HMS Captain after being reduced to harbour service in 1825, and was broken up in 1841.
- HMS Royal Sovereign (1804) was a yacht launched in 1804 and broken up in 1849.
- HMS Royal Sovereign was to have been a 110-gun first-rate. She was ordered in 1833, renamed HMS Royal Frederick in 1839, then HMS Frederick William in 1860, before being launched later that year. She became a training ship named Worcester in 1876, was sold in 1948 and foundered that year.
- HMS Royal Sovereign (1857) was a 121-gun screw first-rate launched in 1857. She was converted between 1861 and 1863 into the first turret ship of the Royal Navy. She was sold for breaking in 1885.
- HMS Royal Sovereign (1891) was a Royal Sovereign-class battleship launched in 1891 and scrapped in 1913.
- HMS Royal Sovereign (05) was a Revenge-class battleship launched in 1915. She was transferred to the Soviet Navy in 1944 and renamed Arkhangelsk, and in 1949 sent back to Britain and scrapped.

== See also ==
- MV Royal Sovereign, a cross-channel passenger boat owned by the New Medway Steam Packet Company, was requisitioned for use as a troop transport in 1939 and participated in the Dunkirk evacuation in May 1940. Renamed HMS Royal Scot, she struck a mine and sank in the Bristol Channel in December 1940.

== Battle honours ==
Ships named Royal Sovereign have earned the following battle honours:

- Kentish Knock, 1652
- Orfordness, 1666
- Sole Bay, 1672
- Schooneveld, 1673
- Texel, 1673
- Barfleur, 1692
- Vigo, 1702
- First of June, 1794
- Cornwallis's Retreat, 1795
- Trafalgar, 1805
- Dunkirk, 1940^{1}
- Calabria, 1940
- Atlantic, 1940−41

1: Awarded to merchant vessel MV Royal Sovereign
