= The Marine Society =

British charity for seafarers

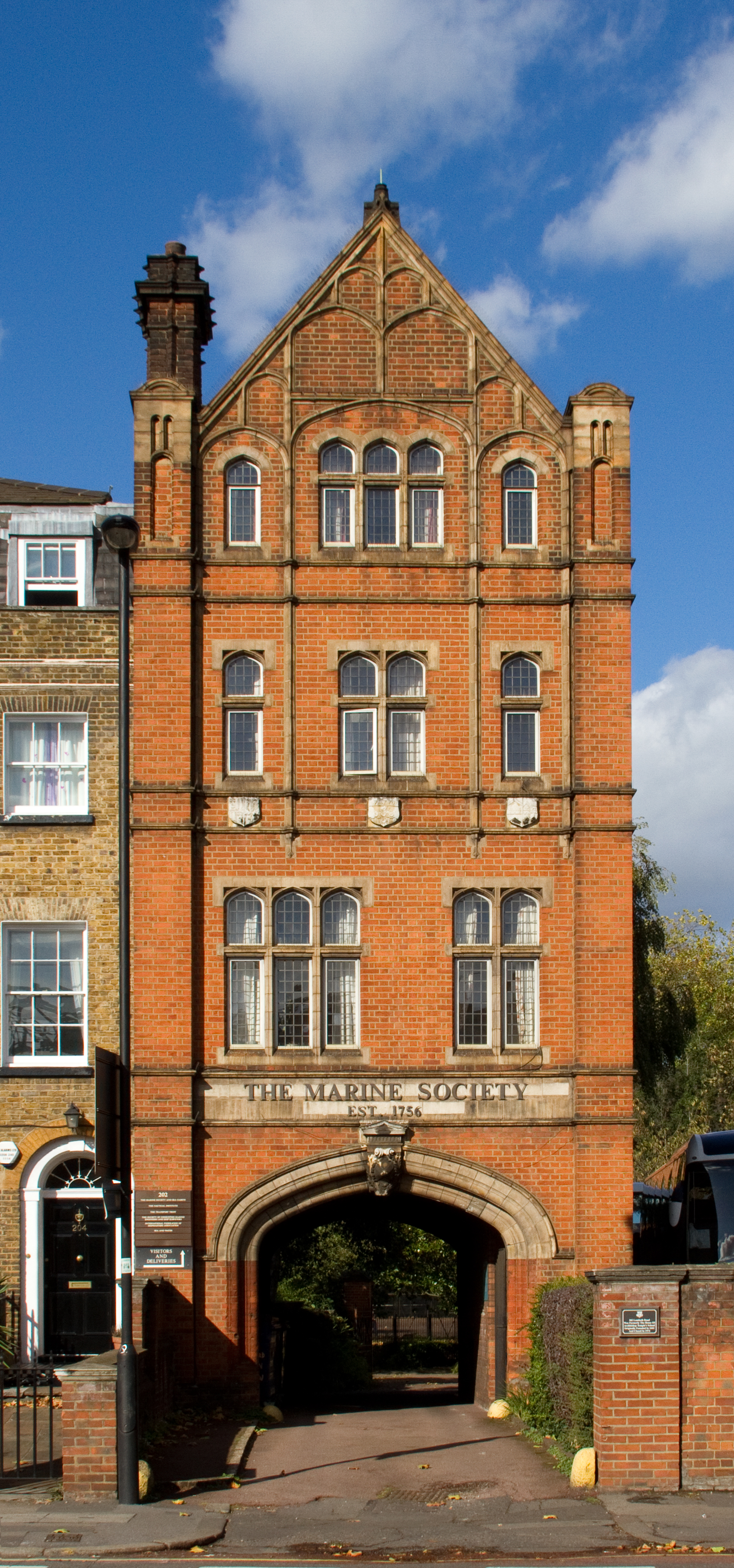
The Marine Society College of the Sea

The Marine Society is a British charity, the world's first established for seafarers. In 1756, at the beginning of the Seven Years' War against France, Austria, and Saxony (and subsequently the Mughal Empire, Spain, Russia and Sweden) Britain urgently needed to recruit men for the navy. Jonas Hanway (1712–1786), who had already made his mark as a traveller, Russia Company merchant, writer and philanthropist, must take the chief credit for founding the society which both contributed to the solution of that particular problem, and has continued for the next two and a half centuries to assist many thousands of young people in preparing for a career at sea.

In 2004, in a merger with the Sea Cadet Association, the Marine Society & Sea Cadets was formed.

== Formation ==
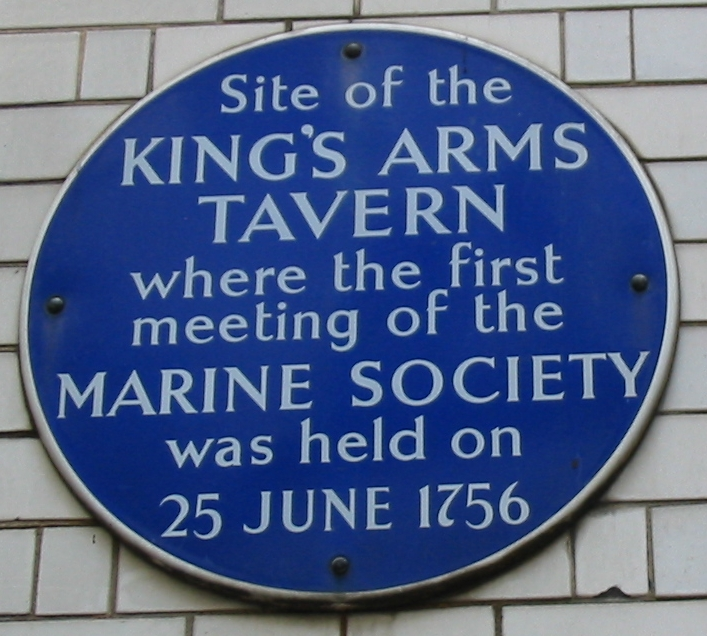
Plaque marking site of the foundation of the Marine Society

The Marine Society, the world's oldest public maritime charity, was an initiative of a group of London merchants and gentlemen, who first met at the King's Arms Tavern, Cornhill, London on 25 June 1756 to discuss a plan to supply two or three thousand seafarers for the navy. Recruitment began immediately. Sponsors were sought and advertisements for volunteers appeared in newspapers and on the street:

"Notice is hereby given, that all stout lads and boys, who incline to go on board His Majesty’s Ships, with a view to learn the duty of a seaman, and are, upon examination, approved by the Marine Society, shall be handsomely clothed and provided with bedding, and their charges born down to the ports where His Majesty’s Ships lye, with all other proper encouragement."

Ten men were duly clothed and delivered to ships of the King's navy. In this small way began the work of the Marine Society. The main object of the charity when founded was sending unemployed or orphaned teenagers to sea as officers' servants. The Royal Navy was estimated to need about 4,500 boys as servants during wartime. Approximately a thousand were 'young gentlemen' intending to be officers, and many of the remainder were supplied by the society. As the boys were for the most part from non-seafaring families the society probably provided a real increase of several thousand to the pool of naval recruitment. The society also provided over ten thousand naval recruits with free clothing, which helped reduce the typhus problem.

== Incorporated by act of Parliament ==
The scheme really took off. By 1763, the society had recruited over 10,000 men and boys; in 1772, such was its perceived importance in the life of the nation, it was incorporated in an act of Parliament, the Marine Society Act 1772 (12 Geo. 3. c. 67).

Admiral Nelson became a stalwart supporter and trustee of the charity, such that by the time of the Battle of Trafalgar (1805) at least 15% of British manpower was being supplied, trained and equipped by the Marine Society. The relative professionalism of these men, the great British naval hero readily acknowledged, played a part in his victories.

== Hostilities cease, education starts ==
But the end of hostilities meant that naval recruitment was no longer the nation's first priority, although Admiral Boscawen was later to write: "No scheme for manning the navy, within my knowledge, has ever had the success as the Marine Society’s."

Hanway now formulated plans for transferring boys to the merchant service on their discharge from naval ships and from then on, the Society was equally involved with both Royal and Merchant navies.

Early reports from commanding officers had indicated that the number of desertions might be reduced if boys equipped by the Society were given a period of training before being sent to sea.

Initially the Society hired a schoolmaster and bandmaster to teach some of the boys and in 1786 purchased a merchant ship the Beatty, which was converted to a training ship and renamed Marine Society. The Society thus became the first organisation in the world to pioneer nautical training for boys in its special school ship which was moored in the Thames between Deptford and Greenwich.

This example was followed in the nineteenth century by many other organisations in ports round the British Isles. From 1799 until 1918 The Admiralty provided a succession of training ships, the last two of which were renamed Warspite; starting with Warspite in 1846, and later HMS Conqueror renamed in 1876. In 1922 the Society commissioned HMS Hermione as the third Warspite. However the outbreak of the Second World War forced the Society to evacuate the ship owing to the probability of air attack.

From 1756 to 1940 the Society recruited over 110,000 men and boys for the Royal Navy, the British East India Company and Merchant service. Records show that from 1756 to 1815 the charity provided some twelve percent of naval manpower, all the more valuable to the nation since each one was a volunteer.

In February 1945 the vice-president of the Society, Frederick Mead, retired from the chairmanship of the Society, following 51 years as a committee member. Mead was 97 years old.

== After the Second World War ==
After the Second World War, the society concluded that there were by then sufficient facilities for sea-training provided by national authorities. It continued to provide sea-kits for many young seafarers and, where necessary, offered grants for their education, but in the 1950s the Society began to insist that cadets thus helped should have completed a good general education, obtaining a minimum of four GCE passes at O level. In this way the Marine Society pioneered what was subsequently accepted as standard practice for the entry of officers into the Merchant Navy.

Between 1940 and 1987, as the society's reserves increased, it was not only able to help individual seafarers but also to make grants to many maritime charities. In 1981 it provided the base funds for the Marine Adventure Sailing Trust, a limited life investment trust fund, which enabled it to make further substantial grants to the Sea Cadet Corps, TS Foudroyant, Ocean Youth Club and other maritime youth charities.

In 1976 the society amalgamated with various other maritime charities with similar aims, including the Incorporated Thames Nautical Training College (ITNTC, located on a succession of ships renamed HMS Worcester), the Seafarers Education Service (SES), the Sailors' Home and Red Ensign Club, the Merchant Navy Comforts Service Trust and the British Ship Adoption Society. The merger of the SES with the Marine Society at this time was hugely significant and helped to ensure the continued relevance of both of their operations. The SES consisted of the Marine Society College of the Sea and the Seafarers Library service, and had been inaugurated in 1919 by Albert Mansbridge who had earlier founded the Workers Educational Association. Both the College of the Sea and the ships' library service continue to flourish today.

For the past 30 years, the principal objectives of the Marine Society have been to facilitate and to provide practical and financial support for the education, training and well-being of all professional seafarers and to encourage young people to embark on maritime careers.

== Marine Society & Sea Cadets ==
For many years the Marine Society has had strong ties with the Sea Cadet Corps, not only as benefactor and landlord to the Sea Cadet Association but also by providing sea training opportunities for hundreds of sea cadets each year. It was because of the complementary objectives of the two charities and, more specifically, the mutual desire to introduce an element of Merchant Navy ethos to the Sea Cadet Corps, that a merger of the Sea Cadet Association with the Marine Society came about on 30 November 2004. The new charity created thereby, known as The Marine Society & Sea Cadets (MSSC), is the holding brand for the two distinct organisations and is the UK's largest non-profit maritime organisation. It is based in a Victorian building close to the river Thames and adjacent to Lambeth Palace in south London.

Within the MSSC organisation, the Marine Society continues as a charity involved in lifelong learning for maritime professionals.
