= List of ship launches in 1843 =

The list of ship launches in 1843 includes a chronological list of some ships launched in 1843.

Date	Ship	Class / type	Builder	Location	Country	Notes
10 January	Dasher	Brig	Oliver Chapman	Chepstow	United Kingdom	For private owner.
11 January	British Hero	East Indiaman	Thomas Royden	Liverpool	United Kingdom	For private owner.
31 January	Indian Queen	Barque	Joseph Wheeler	Cork	United Kingdom	For Messrs. Hardy.
January	Magician	Paddle steamer		River Thames	United Kingdom	For private owner.
January	Mercury	Clipper			United Kingdom	For private owner.
15 February	William Fraser	Brig	Messrs. George Ross & Son	Inverkeithing	United Kingdom	For private owner.
16 February	Mary Holland	Brig	J. Henry Jones	Port Madoc	United Kingdom	For Messrs. Menish & Co.
17 February	Maria	Sloop	Hugh Jones	Beaumaris	United Kingdom	For Hugh Jones.
21 February	Mohawk	Steamship		Kingston	(United Kingdom of Great Britain and Ireland) Province of Canada	For private owner.
9 March	Duke of Cornwall	Chinaman	Messrs. Hilhouse & Hill	Bristol	United Kingdom	For private owner.
9 March	Liverpool	Packet ship		New York	United States	For private owner.
10 March	Commodore	Merchantman	Messrs. Denny & Rankine	Dumbarton	United Kingdom	For private owner.
18 March	Hugh Matthie	Full-rigged ship	Messrs. K. Woods & Sons	Maryport	United Kingdom	For Joseph Sparks.
21 March	Duchess of Leinster	Brig	Fagan	Kingstown	United Kingdom	For private owner.
30 March	Agile	Brig		Cherbourg	France	For French Navy.
March	Bzyb	Barque	J. Crown	Sunderland	United Kingdom	For Imperial Russian Government.
3 April	Fairy	Schooner yacht	Michael Ratsey	Cowes	United Kingdom	For Mr. Perreth.
4 April	Rossignol	Brig		Cherbourg	France	For French Navy.
12 April	Anjer	Full-rigged ship	Messrs. Wilmet & Hall	Newport	United Kingdom	For Messr. Wilmet & Hall
13 April	Rattler	Sloop-of-war		Sheerness Dockyard	United Kingdom	For Royal Navy.
13 April	Zephyr	Merchantman	Coulson	Sculcoates	United Kingdom	For private owner.
17 April	Gloriana	Full-rigged ship	Messrs. T. & W. Smith	Newcastle upon Tyne	United Kingdom	For private owner.
25 April	Victoria and Albert	Royal yacht		Pembroke Dockyard	United Kingdom	For Queen Victoria.
April	Ann Mills	Snow	H. Carr	Sunderland	United Kingdom	For J. Ritson.
April	James and Emma	Schooner	Messrs. Parkinson, Brown & Co.	Hull	United Kingdom	For private owner.
April	Liberty	Brigantine		Fatamagouche	(United Kingdom of Great Britain and Ireland) Colony of Nova Scotia	For private owner.
16 May	Eurydice	Corvette		Portsmouth Dockyard	United Kingdom	For Royal Navy.
18 May	Isabella	Snow	W. Byers	Sunderland	United Kingdom	For T. Crozier.
31 May	Infernal	Driver-class sloop		Woolwich Dockyard	United Kingdom	For Royal Navy.
31 May	Prince of Wales	Paddle steamer	Messrs. Miller & Ravenhill	Blackwall	United Kingdom	For Old Margate Steam-boat Company.
31 May	Rosamond	Steamship		Woolwich Dockyard	United Kingdom	For Royal Navy.
May	Perry	Brig		Norfolk Navy Yard	United States	For United States Navy.
May	Four Sisters	Barque	Ralph Hutchinson	Monkwearmouth	United Kingdom	For S. Mease.
May	Saville	Snow	W. Spowers	Sunderland	United Kingdom	For McColl & Co.
May	Till	Snow	Austin & Mills	Sunderland	United Kingdom	For Pow & Co.
1 June	Dublin	Merchantman	James Edwards	South Shields	United Kingdom	For private owner.
13 June	Raritan	Raritan-class frigate		Philadelphia Navy Yard	United States	For United States Navy.
14 June	Argoed	Schooner	John Arthur Prichard	Pwllheli	United Kingdom	For private owner.
24 June	Amazone	Corvette	Carmesins Werft	Grabow	Prussia	For Prussian Navy.
29 June	Breadalbane	Barque	Hedderwich & Rowan	Kelvinhaugh	United Kingdom	For McNeil & Co.
29 June	Vanguard	Steamship		Govan	United Kingdom	For Dublin, Glasgow and Cork Steam Packet Company.
June	Chusan	Barque	Thomas H. Oliver	Quebec	(United Kingdom of Great Britain and Ireland) Province of Canada	For private owner.
June	Maria	Sloop	Hugh Morris	Pwllheli	United Kingdom	For private owner.
3 July	The Lady Burgoyne	Steamship		Killaloe	United Kingdom	For private owner.
11 July	Helena	Helena-class brig-sloop		Pembroke Dockyard	United Kingdom	For Royal Navy.
12 July	Chichester	Southampton-class frigate		Woolwich Dockyard	United Kingdom	For Royal Navy.
13 July	Helen MacGregor	Paddle steamer	John Laird	Birkenhead	United Kingdom	For Mr Gee.
19 July	Great Britain	Passenger ship	William Patterson	Bristol	United Kingdom	For Great Western Steamship Company. The first ocean-going ship that had both an iron hull and a screw propeller.
27 July	Maria	Schooner	Robert Johnson	Bideford	United Kingdom	For Mr. Hinks and others.
27 July	Sealark	Pandora-class brig-sloop		Portsmouth Dockyard	United Kingdom	For Royal Navy.
29 July	Martha Jaggers	East Indiaman	Messrs. Clarke & Sons	Liverpool	United Kingdom	For private owner.
July	Indus	Brig		River John	(United Kingdom of Great Britain and Ireland) Colony of Nova Scotia	For private owner.
1 August	Lawrence	Brig	Langley B. Culley	Baltimore, Maryland	United States	For United States Navy.
5 August	Queen of the West	Packet ship		New York	United States	For Messrs. Woodhill and Minturn.
10 August	Orénoque	Steam frigate			France	For French Navy.
26 August	Miss Maddocks	Sloop	Henry Jones	Port Madoc	United Kingdom	For private owner.
28 August	Templeman	Full-rigged ship	Messrs Mulvey	Chester	United Kingdom	For Messrs. Prowse & Co.
August	Kate	Schooner			United Kingdom	For private owner.
August	Red Rose	East Indiaman	Messrs. Spence & Son	River Tees	United Kingdom	For private owner.
August	Ross-shire	Brig		River John, Nova Scotia	(United Kingdom of Great Britain and Ireland) Colony of Nova Scotia	For private owner.
3 September	Darien	Steamship		Cherbourg	France	For French Government.
5 September	Princeton	Sloop-of-war		Philadelphia Navy Yard	United States	For United States Navy.
9 September	Hirondelle	Iris-class schooner		Toulon	France	For French Navy.
9 September	Princess Alice	Paddle steamer	Messrs. Tod and MacGregor	Glasgow	United Kingdom	For North Lancashire Steam Navigatio Co.
11 September	Princess Royal	Schooner	Taylor	Woodbridge	United Kingdom	For private owner.
12 September	Pluto	Steamship		Bombay	India	For P&O.
17 September	Iagudiil	Sultan Makhmud-class ship of the line	I. S. Dimitriev	Nicholaieff	Russia	For Imperial Russian Navy.
21 September	Vulture	Cyclops-class frigate		Pembroke Dockyard	United Kingdom	For Royal Navy.
23 September	Chevrette	Tactique-class gun-brig		Cherbourg	France	For French Navy.
25 September	Nimrod	Paddle steamer	Messrs. Thomas Fearnon & Co	Liverpool	United Kingdom	For Cork Steamship Co. Ltd.
26 September	Fire Queen	Paddle steamer	Messrs. Davenport, Grindrod, and Patrick	Liverpool	United Kingdom	For private owner.
26 September	Nimrod	Steamship	Messrs. Vernon & Co.	Liverpool	United Kingdom	For City of Cork Steamship Company.
27 September	Gefion	Frigate			Denmark	For Royal Danish Navy.
29 September	Magnet	Paddle steamer	Messrs. Coates & Young	Belfast	United Kingdom	For private owner.
7 October	Harriett	Schooner	Thomas Cliff	Knottingley	United Kingdom	For John Burnitt.
7 October	Opyt	Schooner	Arsenal de la Carracca	Cádiz	Spain	For Imperial Russian Navy.
10 October	Laffak	Merchantman	Messrs. John & Thomas Johnson	Runcorn	United Kingdom	For private owner.
10 October	Worcester	Southampton-class frigate		Deptford Dockyard	United Kingdom	For Royal Navy.
22 October	Dom Fernando II e Glória	Frigate		Daman	(Portugal) Portuguese India	For Portuguese Navy.
23 October	Belle	Full-rigged ship	Messrs. Robinson & Hall	Stockton-on-Tees	United Kingdom	For private owner.
23 October	Portsmouth	Sloop-of-war		Portsmouth Navy Yard	United States	For United States Navy.
24 October	Dart	Brig			United Kingdom	For private owner.
25 October	Yorkshire	Ocean liner		New York	United States	For private owner.
October	Panama	Steam frigate		Rochefort, Charente-Maritime	France	For French Navy.
6 November	Iris	Corvette		Lisbon	Portugal	For Portuguese Navy.
11 November	The Dove	Steamship	John Laird	North Birkenhead	United Kingdom	For Baptist Missionary Society.
22 November	Harriett	Merchantman	Messrs. Brundritt and Whiteway	Runcorn	United Kingdom	For Joseph Coyne.
22 November	Pandour	Brig		Lorient	France	For French Navy.
5 December	Michigan	Paddle steamer	Stackhouse and Tomlinson	Erie, Michigan	United States	For United States Navy.
23 December	Glenelg	full-rigged ship	Messrs. Evans & Cox	Bideford	United Kingdom	For Messrs. Evan, Baillie, Sons & Co.
29 December	Iron Duke	Steamship	Thomas Wilson	Liverpool	United Kingdom	For City of Dublin Steam Navigation Company.
December	Dundalk	Steamship	Robert Napier and Sons	Govan	United Kingdom	For private owner.
Unknown date	Active	Cutter		Sackets Harbor, New York	United States	For United States Revenue Cutter Service.
Unknown date	Alert	Snow		Sunderland	United Kingdom	For Stevens & Co.
Unknown date	Ancud	Schooner		San Carlos de Ancud	Chile	For Chilean Navy.
Unknown date	Anenome	Snow	Rodham & Todd	Sunderland	United Kingdom	For Mr. Cropton.
Unknown date	Arthur	Schooner	Ralph Hutchinson	Sunderland	United Kingdom	For private owner.
Unknown date	Aurora	Barque		Sunderland	United Kingdom	For Mr. Ryan.
Unknown date	Barleycorn	Merchantman	Bowman and Drummond	Blyth	United Kingdom	For private owner.
Unknown date	Charles	Sloop			United Kingdom	For private owner.
Unknown date	Commerce	Mersey flat	Bridgewater Trustees, or Bridgewater Navigation Company	Runcorn	United Kingdom	For private owner.
Unknown date	Countess of Bective	Barque	J. Crown	Sunderland	United Kingdom	For Mr. Nicholson.
Unknown date	Cresswell Packet	Schooner	J. Bell	Sunderland	United Kingdom	For J. Bell.
Unknown date	Cressy	Full-rigged ship	Laing & Simey	Sunderland	United Kingdom	For Duncan Dunbar & Co.
Unknown date	Crown	Snow	J. Crown	Sunderland	United Kingdom	For J. Crown.
Unknown date	Dido	Brig		Sunderland	United Kingdom	For Mr. Burrell.
Unknown date	Duchess of Buccleuch	East Indiaman	James Edwards	South Shields	United Kingdom	For J. Edwards.
Unknown date	Duncan Ritchie	Barque		Aberdeen	United Kingdom	For private owner.
Unknown date	Desirée	Man of war			Sweden	For Royal Swedish Navy.
Unknown date	Ebenezer	Merchantman	J. Todd	Sunderland	United Kingdom	For R. Oliver.
Unknown date	Elizabeth	Brig	W. Chilton	Sunderland	United Kingdom	For Wood & Co.
Unknown date	Empire	Paddle steamer			United States	For Troy Line.
Unknown date	Ferret	Schooner	Laing & Simey	Sunderland	United Kingdom	For P. Laing.
Unknown date	George & Richard	Snow	J. Brown	Sunderland	United Kingdom	For J. Hay.
Unknown date	Gertrude	Brig			(United Kingdom of Great Britain and Ireland) Colony of Newfoundland	For private owner.
Unknown date	Golconda	Barque		Southwick	United Kingdom	For Mr. Richardson.
Unknown date	Guide	Pilot vessel		Liverpool	United Kingdom	For Iron Company.
Unknown date	Henderson	Snow	Stafford & Forster	Sunderland	United Kingdom	For Milne & Co.
Unknown date	Henry & Ann	Snow	H. Dixon	Sunderland	United Kingdom	For Mr. Longstaff.
Unknown date	Hercules	Paddle steamer		Cincinnati, Ohio	United States	For Ocean Towing Co.
Unknown date	Home	Schooner		Black River, Ohio	United States	For W. D. Winslow, Robert White and Thomas Jones.
Unknown date	Independence	Steamboat	James M. Averill	Chicago, Illinois	United States	For private owner.
Unknown date	Isabella	Sloop	George Barker	Sunderland	United Kingdom	For private owner.
Unknown date	James M. Waterbury	Pilot boat		Williamsburgh, New York	United States	For Ornen & Roberts.
Unknown date	Jane Alice	Snow	W. Potts	Sunderland	United Kingdom	For J. Potts.
Unknown date	John & Ann	Schooner	Hylton Carr	Hylton Ferry	United Kingdom	For S. Fletcher.
Unknown date	Lady Kingsale	Sloop	William Bonker	Salcombe	United Kingdom	For Samuel Pearce.
Unknown date	Lady Ridley	Schooner	Bowman and Drummond	Blyth	United Kingdom	For Mr. Marfitt.
Unknown date	Lansier	Full-rigged ship		Dunkerque	France	For Royal Netherlands Navy.
Unknown date	Leda	Snow	James Robinson	Sunderland	United Kingdom	For Mr. Errington.
Unknown date	Lord Ashburton	Barque	Joshua Briggs	St. Andrews	(United Kingdom of Great Britain and Ireland) Colony of New Brunswick	For Nehemiah Marks.
Unknown date	Lucy Walker	Paddle steamer		Cincinnati, Ohio	United States	For private owner.
Unknown date	Mary Jane	Schooner	Brundrit & Whiteway	Runcorn	United Kingdom	For private owner.
Unknown date	Mary Queen of Scots	Barque		Sunderland	United Kingdom	For Mr. Fairfield.
Unknown date	Newbottle	Snow	W. Wilkinson	Sunderland	United Kingdom	For private owner.
Unknown date	Pallas	Barque	Bartram & Lister	Sunderland	United Kingdom	For Mr. Henley.
Unknown date	Patriot Queen	Full-rigged ship	T. & J. Brocklebank	Whitehaven	United Kingdom	For T. & J. Brocklebank.
Unknown date	Paul Jones	Clipper	Waterman & Ewell	Medford, Massachusetts	United States	For Daniel C. Bacon, Robert Bennet Forbes, John Murray Forbes and Russell & Co.
Unknown date	Primus	Barque		Suomenlinna	(Russian Empire) Grand Duchy of Finland	For private owner.
Unknown date	Queen of the Tyne	Merchantman	Kirkbride & partners	Sunderland	United Kingdom	For R. Wright.
Unknown date	Seneca	Steamship		New York	United States	For private owner.
Unknown date	Sprite	Snow	John M. Gales	Sunderland	United Kingdom	For Mr. Thompson.
Unknown date	Swallow	Snow	G. Thompson	Sunderland	United Kingdom	For Mr. Thompson.
Unknown date	Thorndale	Snow	Bartram & Lister	Sunderland	United Kingdom	For W. Burnett.
Unknown date	Uncas	Steamship		location	United States	For private owner.
Unknown date	Van Speyk	Sixth rate		Dunkerque	France	For Royal Navy.
Unknown date	Vertumnus	Barque	S. & P. Mills	Sunderland	United Kingdom	For S. Mills.
Unknown date	Vulcano	Paddle steamer		Venice	Austrian Empire	For Austrian Navy.
Unknown date	William Thompson	Schooner	William Thompson	Dumfries	United Kingdom	For William Thompson.
Unknown date	Zephyr	Snow	W. Wilkinson	Sunderland	United Kingdom	For Mr. Lumsdon.
Unknown date	Zior	Merchantman	Peter Austin	Sunderland	United Kingdom	For Mr. Blackett.
