= ICME =

ICME may refer to:

- Integrated computational materials engineering, a product design technique
- Institute of Cast Metals Engineers, a British professional engineering institution
- International Congress on Mathematical Education, held every four years under the auspices of the International Commission on Mathematical Instruction
- Interplanetary coronal mass ejection, disturbance from Sun's corona that launches electromagnetic waves and accelerating particles
- International Conference on Materials Engineering
- International Council on Metals and the Environment
- İçme, Elâzığ
