= Java-class frigate =

Java-class frigate may refer to:

- Java-class frigate (1813), a series of sailing frigates of the United States Navy built during the War of 1812
- Southampton-class frigate (1820), sometimes known as the Java-class, built by the Royal Navy during the Napoleonic Wars
- Java-class frigate (1828), a series of sailing frigates of the Royal Netherlands Navy
- Java-class frigate (1863), a series of steam frigates of the United States Navy built during the American Civil War
