= Ingress Abbey =

- Ingress Abbey
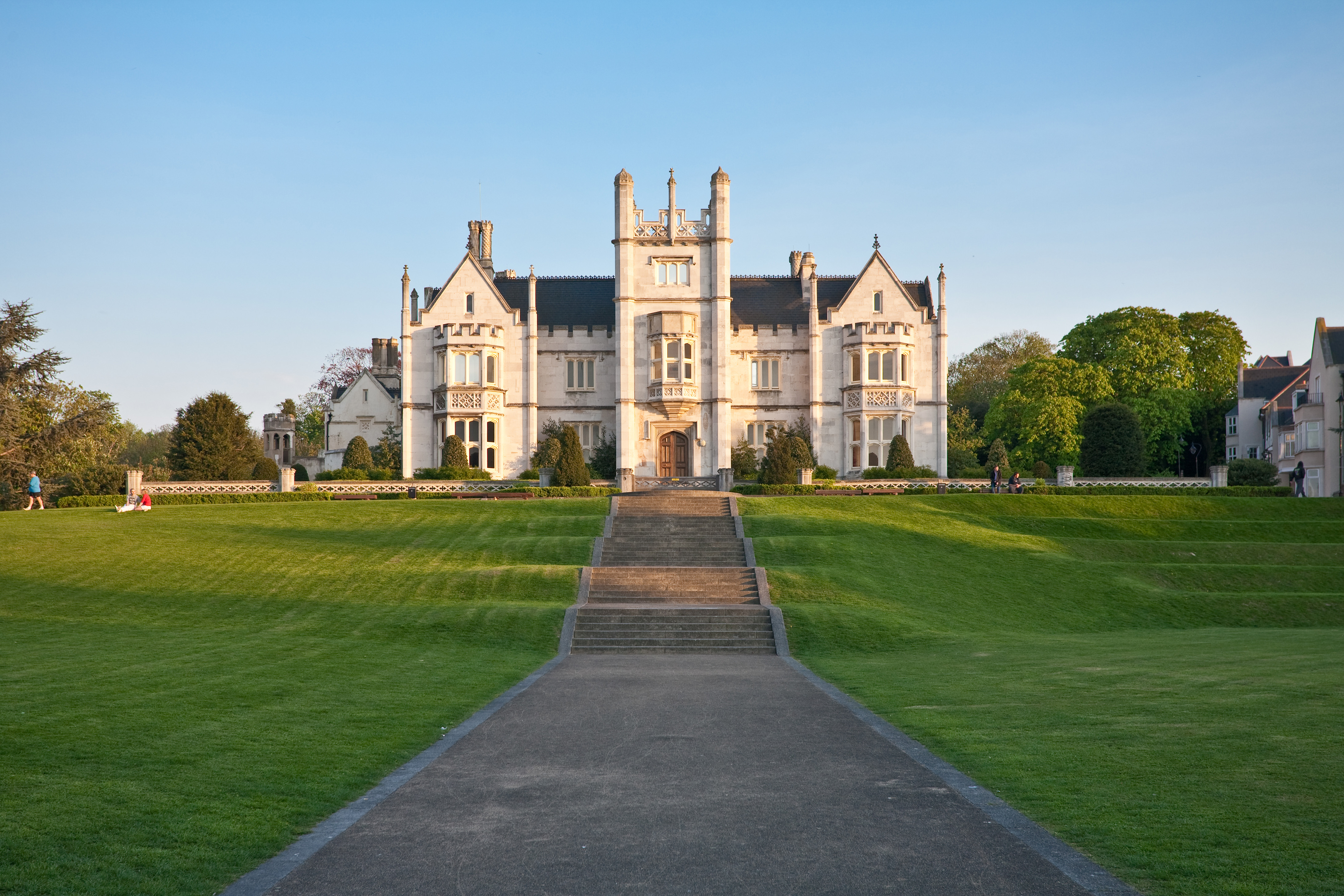
- Ingress Abbey, front facade

- Location within Kent

General information
- Status: Grade II listed
- Type: Stately home
- Architectural style: Jacobethan
- Location: Greenhithe, Kent, England, UK
- Coordinates: 51.4521°N 0.2890°E
- Construction started: 1833

Ingress Abbey is a Neo-Gothic Jacobean-style country house in Greenhithe, Kent, England, built in 1833 on the site of an earlier Palladian-style house.

== History of the Ingress Estate ==
The Ingress Estate was a manor in the hamlet of Greenhithe. In 1363, the manor was endowed upon the Priory Abbess in Dartford, Kent, by Edward III (1307–1377). The priory of Dartford was the only house of Dominican nuns in England. The sisterhood was placed under the care of the Friars Preachers of Kings Langley, Hertfordshire, and a community of sisters commenced religious observance at Dartford in 1356 under the friars already there. The original intention of the founder, Edward II, was to establish a convent of forty nuns, which with the sixty friars of Kings Langley would make up the hundred religious he contemplated when he founded the friary of Kings Langley, but it is doubtful whether this number was ever reached.

During the Dissolution of the Monasteries in the 16th century, the estate was confiscated and sold, with the proceeds used to finance the wars of King Henry VIII. According to legend, the Abbess of Dartford, Jane Fane, put a curse on Henry VIII and all of his male descendants as a punishment for confiscating the estate. This curse was supposedly passed onto all future owners of the estate, such that pipes would burst in the property at random intervals.

Henry VIII kept the site and rebuilt it to use it as a country retreat whilst visiting the coast. In 1540, Sir Richard Long was paid £8 per day to be keeper of the site. In 1548, the King, in consideration of the compulsory surrender of certain lands in Surrey, granted the priory and manor of Dartford to Anne of Cleves.

After Henry VIII's death, seven nuns, who had already been permitted by Queen Mary to return to Dartford, re-established the convent at Kings Langley Priory, Hertfordshire, with Elizabeth Cressener as prioress. However, in 1559, visitors from the Privy Council came to Dartford and tendered the oaths of supremacy and uniformity, first to the provincial prior, and then to each of the nuns separately; all refused to take the oaths. The visitors then sold the goods of the convent at low prices, paid the debts of the house, divided what little remained among the sisters, and ordered them to leave within twenty-four hours. The band of Dominican exiles, consisting of two priests, a prioress, four choir-nuns, four lay sisters, and a young girl not yet professed, joined the nuns of Syon House, Middlesex (now London), and crossed to the Netherlands. Queen Elizabeth then granted the estate to Edward Darbyshire and John Bere, who purchased much of the lands of Dartford Priory made available by the dissolution of the monasteries.

In 1649 during the English Civil War, the estate, including the mansion house, manor, farm, lime kiln, wharf, and land (including the chalk cliffs and salt and freshwater marshes) were passed to Captain Edward Brent of Southward for £1122. It was sold in 1748 to William, Viscount Duncannon, an Anglo-Irish aristocrat, who on his father's death succeeded him as Earl of Bessborough and Baron Ponsonby of Sysonby. He lived at Ingress with his wife Carolina, the eldest daughter of William, Duke of Devonshire. He greatly improved the seat, and reputedly commissioned Capability Brown to landscape the grounds (though evidence for this is lacking). In 1760, Carolina died at Ingress. The property was then sold to John Calcraft, MP for Rochester.

On John Calcraft's death in 1772, the estate passed to his son John, who sold it in 1788 to John Disney Roebuck, on whose death in 1796 it passed to his son Henry Roebuck. The estate then passed to William Havelock (1757-1837) shipbuilder and ship-owner, father of Sir Henry Havelock (1795-1857), army officer, who spent his early childhood at the Ingress Estate and attended Dartford Grammar School. William Havelock lost his money through solicitors' fraud and loss of uninsured ships. Ingress Park estate was sold to the Crown. At that point, owing to the contemporary conflict with France, plans were drawn up for a large dockyard to be built from Northfleet to Greenhithe (which would have included the Ingress Estate). The house was demolished (1820) and the site cleared. However, instead docks were built at Greenwich and the plans for Greenhithe-Northfleet were dropped.

=== Construction, development and occupants ===
In 1831, a wealthy solicitor named James Harmer purchased the land, and in 1833 built his Elizabethan-style mansion, which he called Ingress Abbey, on the banks of the Thames. He provided his architect, Charles Moreing, with £120,000 for the construction of follies, grottoes, and hermit's caves. Some of the stone from the Old London Bridge was used in building Ingress Abbey.

Harmer served as a model for Jaggers, the Charles Dickens character from Great Expectations, and in the mid-1800s he also owned the Weekly Dispatch to which the poet Eliza Cook was a longterm contributor, living and writing some of her works at Ingress Abbey.

In the 1880s, the Shah of Persia sailed up the Thames and noted that "the only thing worth mentioning at Greenhithe was a mansion standing amid trees on a green carpet extending down to the water's edge".

During the First World War, Ingress Abbey was used as an army hospital. By 1922 both house and grounds had been purchased by the Thames Nautical Training College whose training ship HMS Worcester was moored in the River Thames.

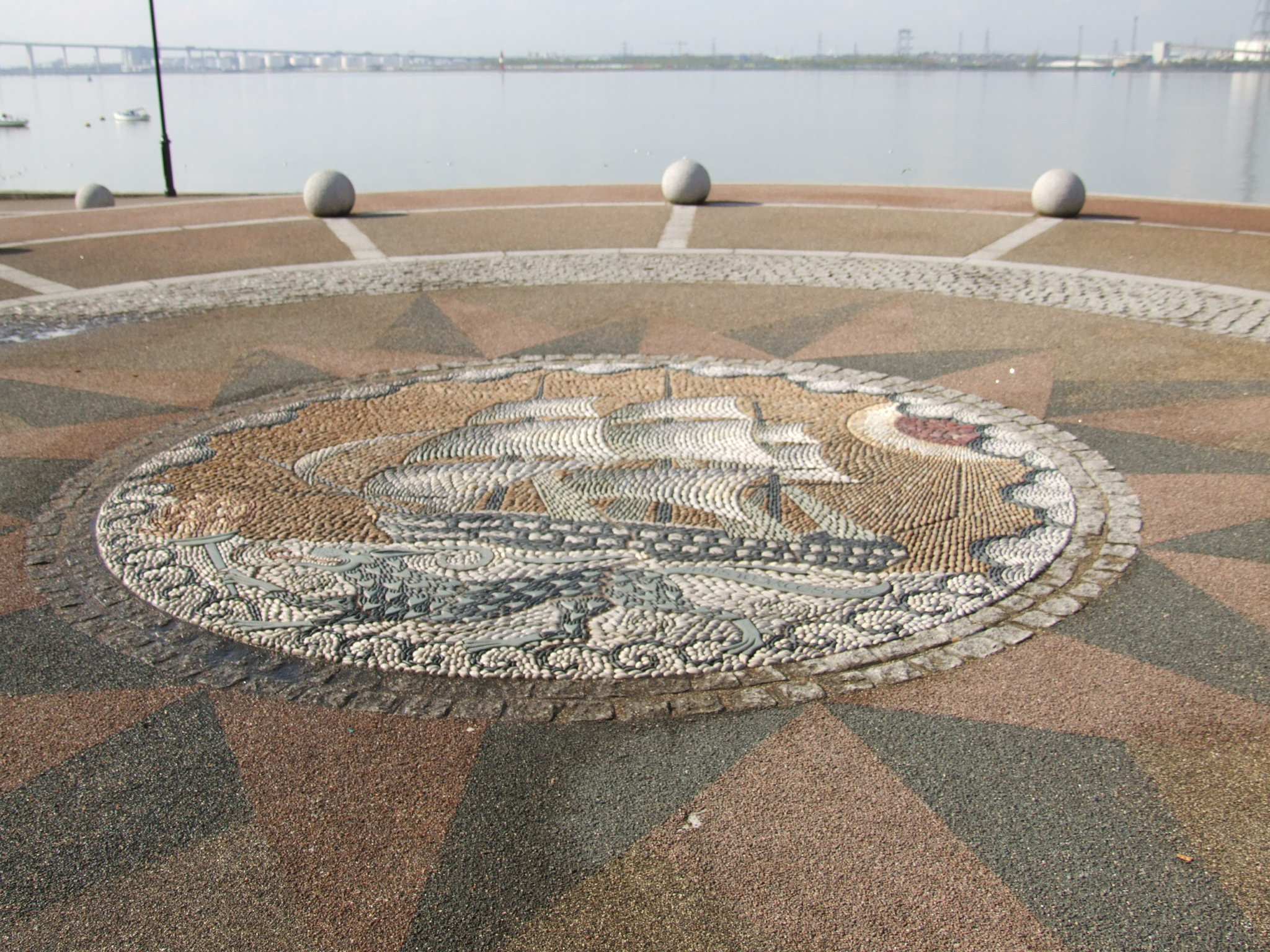
Piazza memorial to Thames Nautical Training College on the shore of Ingress Park.

By 1998 the site had been sold for redevelopment into modern housing, with the first phase completed in 2001. Crest Nicholson spent £6 million restoring the abbey, follies and grounds as part of the redevelopment scheme. This included a nautical themed piazza inspired by the estate's past nautical training and linked to the Abbey by a tree-lined boulevard. Ingress Abbey was bought in 2001 by Pandora International, and then by Irène Major in 2012 and converted back to a family home. In May 2016, the Abbey became an official honorary consulate of the Republic of Lithuania.

=== Follies ===
There are a number of follies on the Ingress estate, including:

The Cave of the Seven Heads abuts and is under the Fastrack bus road that runs through a tunnel, under the gatehouse which still stands, at the location of the original main gate to the estate, between the Ingress estate and Greenhithe railway station.

The Georgian Garden Bridge is a late 18th or early 19th flint and brick garden bridge on the eastern edge of the Ingress Estate.

The Georgian Wall Tunnel, the entrance to which is bricked up for safety reasons, is set in the chalk cliffs overlooking the Ingress Estate.

The Grange and adjacent tunnel is on the heritage path a couple of hundred yards south of Ingress Abbey. It is a large folly arch in the shape of a gatehouse with attached storage chambers and a dog-legged flint lined tunnel with five rectangular chambers carved out of the chalk. Also adjacent is a flint four-centred arch about 8 feet in height with a splayed chamber cut out of the hillside.

The Grotto comprises a number of small flint lined caves set in a semi-circle. Originally these were next to the driveway to the Abbey just down from the gatehouse at the original main gate to the estate. They can now be accessed on the other side of the Fastrack bus road from the Cave of the Seven Heads.

There are supposedly a number of tunnels leading from Ingress Abbey. One certainly exists, situated between the Ingress Abbey Coach House and Ingress Abbey.

The Lovers Arch is a flint-lined alcove south-east of Ingress Abbey which now houses a bench.

The Monkswell comprises a short tunnel with leading to a semicircular vaulted roofed chamber with well shaft.

The Prioress Tomb is to the left of the path leading to the Grange near the gate to the car park behind Ingress Abbey.

=== Events and filming ===
It is theorized that Ingress Abbey may have been one of the inspirations for Carfax, Count Dracula's fictional home in England in Bram Stoker's 1897 novel, Dracula. Ingress Abbey has been used as one of the filming location for a number of television and motion picture productions including:

- "The Kidnapped Prime Minister", an episode of the ITV television drama Agatha Christie's Poirot.
- "He Who Dares: Downing Street Siege", feature film
