= Hughes Bolckow =

English shipbreaking company

- Formerly: Hughes Bolckow Shipbreaking Company, Ltd; Messrs, Hughes, Bolckow, and Co., Limited
- Industry: Ship breaking
- Headquarters: Blyth, Northumberland, England
- Services: Scrap recycling
- Parent: Metal Industries Group subsidiary

Hughes Bolckow formerly Messrs, Hughes, Bolckow, and Co., Limited was a well-known shipbreaking company based in Blyth, Northumberland.

== Background ==
Intending to create an industrial park for dismantling obsolete warships in 1911, the company leased 6 acres (2.4 ha) of land from Lord Ridley and the Blyth Harbour Commissioners.

The company was responsible for scrapping a number of famous Royal Navy ships including HMS Britannia (previously HMS Prince of Wales). Their first ship was the former Certified Industrial Training Ship, HMS Southampton, which was sent to Blyth in June 1912 to be broken up. In response to requests from customers, the company created a series of "choice Antiques" from the fine old seasoned timber they possessed from Britannia. The company even had a Ship Timber Department that would create articles manufactured from teakwood taken from obsolete battleships and preserved in "Solignum."

During World War I, Messrs, Hughes, Bolckow, and Co. Limited experimented with employing women in jobs that were traditionally reserved for men. By 1916 13% of the workforce were women; the UK Ministry of Labour approved the work provided the women did not have to lift a sledgehammer weighing more than 5 pounds (2.3 kg).

In 1921, the company acquired four huge concrete hangars at the Marske-by-the-Sea Aerodrome in North Yorkshire. The hangars also had an attached 30 acres (12 ha) of land that the company announced would be used to store and to dispose of material purchased by the company from dumps in France.

Over the course of its existence the company bought up a number of other companies such as the Worth, Mackenzie ft Company, Limited, which was purchased in 1935. By 1952 it had become a subsidiary of Metal Industries, Limited and was listed on their books. In 1960 The Hughes Bolchow Shipbreaking Co., Ltd., of Blyth changed its name to Hughes Bolckow Ltd. so as to serve notice that, although its main activity was still shipbreaking, the company was branching out.

== Contributions to Railway Preservation ==
They also scrapped locomotives en masse during the 1960s, one locomotive purchased from this area being NER Class T2 (BR Class Q6) No. 63395, which has been preserved.

== See also ==
- Blyth Shipbuilding Company
- Bolckow, Vaughan

== Bibliography ==
=== References ===
- Institute of British Foundrymen, Welsh Engineers' and Founders' Association; Foundry Trades' Equipment & Supplies Association (1935). "Hughes Bolckow". The Foundry Trade Journal. 52. Institute of Cast Metals Engineers.
- The Daily Telegraph (15 February 1915). "H.M.S. Britannia – The Passing of an Historic Ship". The Daily Telegraph. ISSN 0307-1235. OCLC 49632006.
- Mechanical World and Metal Trades Journal (1911). "Mechanical World". Mechanical World and Metal Trades Journal. 50.
- Shipping World (1960). "Shipping World". Shipping World. 142.
- Spooner, Stanley (January 1921). "Marske by the sea Aerodrome Acquired". Flight – the Aircraft Engineer & Airships. XIII (631). Royal Aero Club of The United Kingdom. ISSN 0015-3710.
- Studio International Art (1918). "Antiques". Studio International Art. 75–76. National Magazine Company.
- Woollacott, Angela (1994). On Her Their Lives Depend: Munitions Workers in the Great War. University of California Press. ISBN 9780520914650. - Total pages: 241
- The Timber Trades Journal and Saw-mill Advertiser (1913). "The Timber Trades Journal and Saw-mill Advertiser". The Timber Trades Journal and Saw-mill Advertiser. 74 (1936–1948). W. Rider & son.
- The Times (4 September 1952). "The Times". The Times. London, UK. ISSN 0140-0460.
