= HMS Southampton (1820) =

Frigate of the Royal Navy

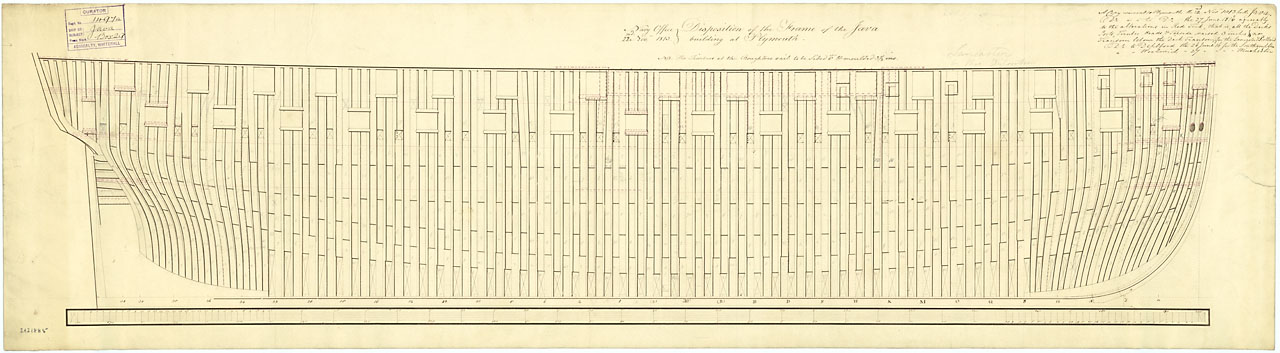
- Southampton

History

United Kingdom
- Name: HMS Southampton
- Builder: Deptford Dockyard, Kent, England
- Laid down: March 1817
- Launched: 7 November 1820
- Acquired: 11 May 1821
- Decommissioned: 26 June 1912
- Fate: Sent to Blyth in June 1912 to be broken up by the Hughes Bolckow company

HMS Southampton was the third ship of the Royal Navy to carry the name Southampton. She was a fourth-rate, 52-gun ship. She was one of the six Southampton-class frigates.

== Construction and early years ==
HMS Southampton was built at Deptford Dockyard and laid down in March 1817. The ship was launched on 7 November 1820 and completed on 11 May 1821. On completion she went into ordinary.

The early 1830s see her making a voyage to India, Ceylon, and travelling as far as Singapore before returning to England.

The 1840s and 1850s see her at various times mainly in Rio de Janeiro, Montevideo and Cape Town.

In 1860 she went into ordinary at Sheerness, and she served as a Coastguard ship in Harwich until 1867.

== Certified Industrial Training Ship at Sammy's Point, Hull ==
In 1867 Southampton left Harwich and moved to Hull and, on 18 June 1867, began service as a certified industrial training ship.

Certificated industrial training ships were special kinds of certified industrial schools which were set up to attempt to solve the problem of destitute children who, before the Elementary Education Act 1870, were largely neglected and consequently often drifted into crime as a result of squalid living conditions and criminal associates. In 1846 the Education Department had offered grants to build workshops, workhouses or kitchens, and to provide schools, and the Committee of Council extended these industrial grants in 1856 and 1857. The aims were to prevent boys from falling into bad company and to give industrial training. However, the whole national picture was changed in 1860 when industrial schools were transferred to the charge of the Home Secretary, and they became allied with reformatory schools. The scope of industrial schools was widened when previous legislation was consolidated by the Industrial Schools Act 1866 (29 & 30 Vict. c. 118). Under this act, children under 14 years could be sent by two justices to an industrial school if not under proper control and guardianship, if an orphan, or in danger of adopting a criminal life. Children under 12 years could be committed if found guilty of an offence punishable by imprisonment but had not previously been found guilty of a felony. Later acts allowed children to be committed if their mothers were convicted of a crime, if they were living with common or reputed prostitutes, or if under 16 years and had been assaulted or neglected likely to cause injury. The Elementary Education Act 1870 allowed school boards to take over the powers of the prison authorities; they could contribute to the upkeep of voluntary industrial schools, build new ones, or enter into an agreement with managers which resulted in children being committed for persistent truancy. However, following the Education Act 1876 these children were largely accommodated in Truant Schools and Day Industrial Schools.

While at Hull Southampton was moored off Sammy's Point. Sammy's Point is on the east bank of the River Hull at the confluence with the Humber. It takes its name from the Martin Samuelson Shipyard, which once occupied the site.

Southampton, moored on the River Humber at Hull, was established as a training ship in 1866. On 31 July 1868, the ship was officially certified as an industrial school ship, allowing it to take boys committed by magistrates. The vessel could accommodate 240 boys aged from 11 to 15. On 26 November 1879, three inmates set fire to the ship. Another inmate informed the officer on watch and the fire was extinguished. Those responsible were charged with arson. By the end of 1909, Southampton had trained 2,600 boys, 57 per cent of whom had gone into the Merchant Service, and 5 per cent to the Royal Navy.

From 1879 to 1900, she was under the command of Captain George Doherty Broad. Those present on the ship at the time of the United Kingdom census, 1881 are listed on "1881 Ships in Port in the UK". At the time of the United Kingdom census, 1911, there were 175 inmates aboard the ship, less than the capacity of 240. The ship was under the command of the captain, Henry Jeffreys De Winton Kitcat. His wife, son, and six members of staff were also present.

== Disposal ==
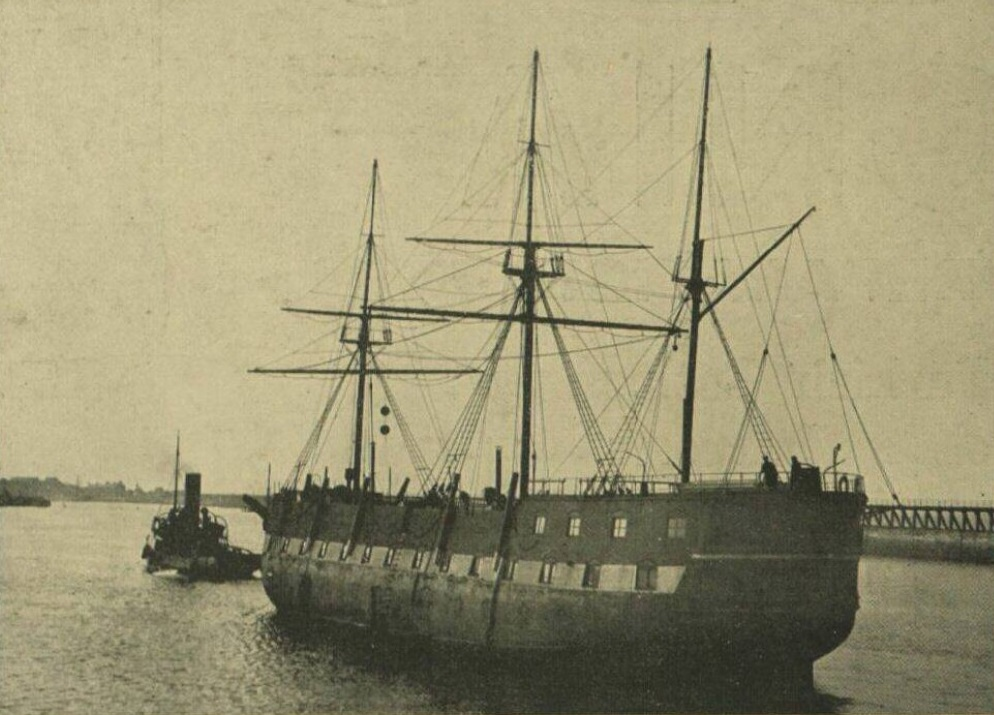
Southampton arriving at Blyth port in 1912 for demolition. Illustrated London News 1912

The ship was closed on 28 March 1912. The boys were transferred to the training ship Mount Edgcumbe, which was the renamed HMS Winchester, anchored in the River Tamar at Devonport. Southampton was sold on 26 June 1912 and sent to Blyth to be broken up by the Hughes Bolckow company. She was towed from the Humber and on arrival, a Luncheon was held on board for 50 or so local notables. Lord Ridley knocked out the first bolt. Hughes Bolckow paid £2,655 for her and many people trooped to Blyth to see her. One commented: "Her seasoned timbers will be turned scientifically into enduring articles of furniture, which will defy the worst efforts of railway porters or furniture removers to demolish."
