= Irène Major =

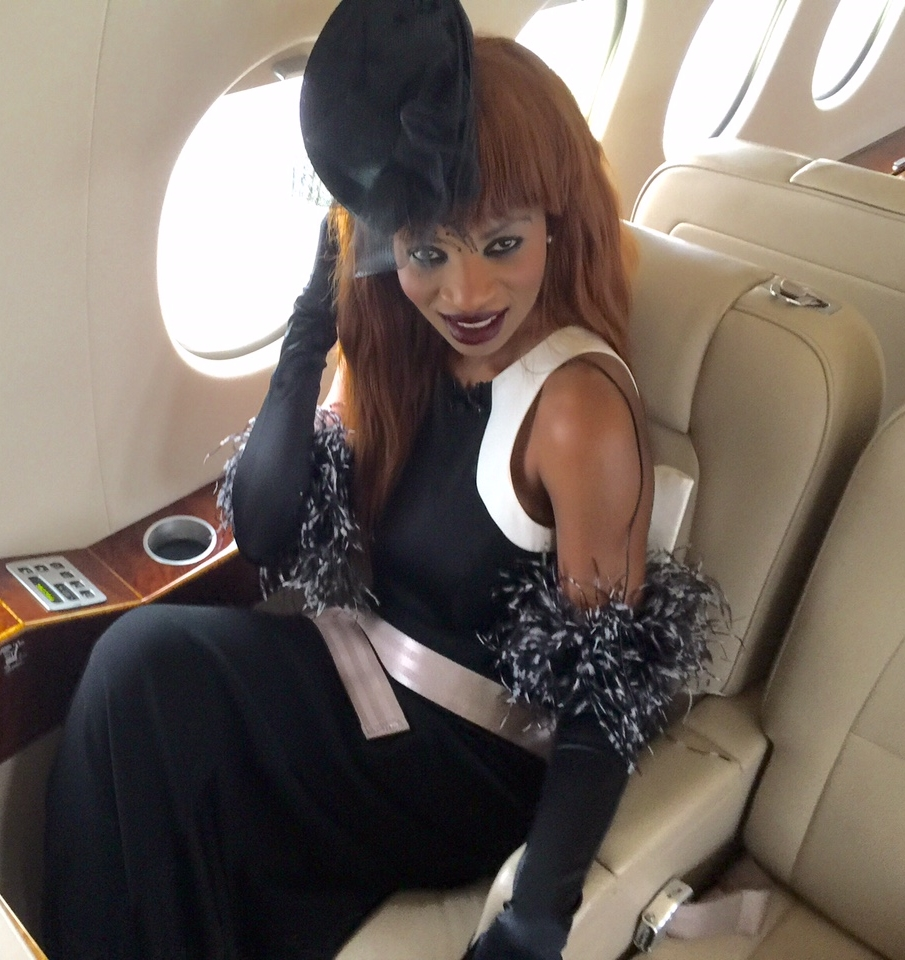
- Major in 2015
- Born: 22 October 1979 (age 47); Cameroon
- Occupations: Singer; businesswoman; model; human rights activist
- Years active: 1994–present
- Spouse: Sam Malin
- Children: 9
- Musical career
- Genre: Pop

Irène Major (born 22 October 1979) is a British-Cameroonian singer, model and activist.

== Personal life ==
Major was born in Yaoundé, Cameroon to a soldier father and seamstress mother; the family was "middle-class but poor".

Major is married to oil and gas tycoon Sam Malin who is of dual Canadian and British citizenship. She has nine children. In 2012, the couple purchased Ingress Abbey, subsequently converted for use as a family home.

== Career ==
From Cameroon, Major moved first to Paris, France and then to the United Kingdom.

Major has appeared as the presenter of Ess'mode par Irene Major, a guest judge on The One, and as an on-screen hostess on the V Graham Norton show. In 2015, she appeared in Britain's Flashiest Families, and in 2016, in Shock Docs: Britain's Pushiest Parents. Major is the model for a display mannequin in the Drama Diva collection by Rootstein.

Major set up the pop group Major in 2012 with her sister Elsa. They have released a number of songs and videos:

- Love Me Boy (written by Pete Kirtley)
- Romeo (written by Pete Bellotte and Sylvester Levay, original performer: Donna Summer)
- Birds (written by Irene Major)
- Cannes Cannes Cannes (written by Pete Hammond and Jeff Chegwin)
- Umqombothi - African Heroes (original version written by Sello "Chicco" Twala and Attie van Wyk and performed by Yvonne Chaka Chaka)

== Philanthropy ==
Major is involved with various philanthropic and human rights causes. In 2008, she founded IM Life, a charity with a focus on sub-Saharan Africa and the western Indian Ocean, to provide support, including food, shelter, training and logistics support, to those in desperate need. She is also the founder of the Gay in Africa Foundation, a campaign which exists to boost awareness of the persecution and suffering of the African LGBT community and fight against homophobia and discrimination against the LGBT in Africa.

Major is an ambassador for International Harbor, a charity founded by former US special operations veterans dedicated to eliminating human trafficking and abduction through advocacy and action.
