= HMS Royal Frederick =

Two ships of the Royal Navy built at Portsmouth Royal Dockyard were intended to be HMS Royal Frederick, but renamed before being launched:

- Royal Frederick was ordered in 1827 as a 120-gun Caledonia-class ship of the line, but re-ordered 3 September 1833 to a 110-gun Queen-class design. On 12 April 1839 the designated name was changed, shortly before her launch, to HMS Queen in honour of the new monarch.
- A second 110-gun Queen-class ship of the line was ordered on 12 September 1833 under the name Royal Sovereign, suspended in 1834, and later renewed. On 12 April 1839, in consequence of the above change, the designated name was changed to Royal Frederick and she was laid down on 1 July 1841. After slow progress, she was re-ordered as a Modified-Queen-class ship, but again the order was changed to an 86-gun screw battleship. The ship was renamed a second time on 28 January 1860, shortly before her launch as HMS Frederick William.
