= HMS Winchester (1822) =

Frigate of the Royal Navy

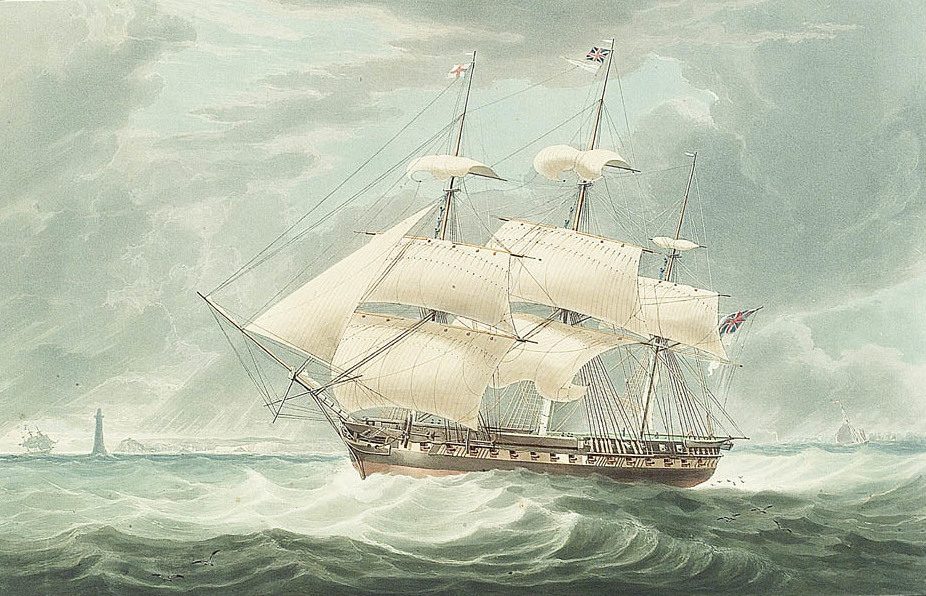
- HMS Winchester

History

United Kingdom
- Name: HMS Winchester
- Ordered: 23 May 1816
- Builder: Woolwich Dockyard
- Laid down: November 1818
- Launched: 21 June 1822
- Commissioned: 16 September 1822
- Renamed: Training ship Conway (1861); HMS Mount Edgcumbe (1876); Training ship Mount Edgcumbe (1877)
- Fate: Sold for breaking 8 April 1921

General characteristics
- Class & type: 60-gun Southampton-class frigate
- Tons burthen: 1,468 11/94 bm (as designed)
- Length: 172 ft (52 m) (gundeck); 144 ft 9 in (44 m) (keel)
- Beam: 44 ft 3.25 in (13 m)
- Depth of hold: 14 ft 6 in (4 m)
- Sail plan: Full-rigged ship
- Complement: 450
- Armament: Designed for 60 guns, fitted with 52 guns; As built: UD: 30 × 24-pdr guns; QD & FC: 16 × 42-pdr carronades and 6 × 24-pdr guns; Re-armed: UD: 26 × 32-pdr guns; QD & FC: 20 × 32-pdr guns and 4 × 8-inch shell guns

HMS Winchester was a 60-gun Southampton-class sailing frigate of the Royal Navy. She was laid down in 1816 at Woolwich Dockyard, and launched on 21 June 1822. Although designed for 60 guns, she and the rest of her class carried 52 guns. From 1831 to 1861 she served in North America and Southeast Asia. In 1861 she became the training ship Conway at Liverpool, and from 1876 she was the training ship Mount Edgcumbe. She was sold in 1921.

== Operational service ==
=== Flagship in North America, Cape of Good Hope and the East Indies ===
Although ordered in 1816 and laid down in 1818, Winchester was not launched until 21 June 1822, and commissioned on 16 September later that year.

In October 1829 Captain Charles Austen, brother of the novelist Jane Austen, took command in Bermuda where Winchester was the flagship on the North America and West Indies Station.

In 1832 Lord Willeam Paget commanded her until June 1833 when she was paid off.

Between 1834 and 1838 she was on the East Indies station and under the command of Captain Edward Sparshott.

From 1842 she served as the flagship on the Cape of Good Hope Station, under the command of Captain Charles Eden.

In 1852 Captain Granville Gower Loch commissioned Winchester to relieve Hastings as flagship in China and the East Indies. During 1852 and 1853 she took part in military operations on coast of Burma during the Second Burmese War. Shortly after arriving at Rangoon Rear-Admiral Charles Austen died; Commodore George Lambert was off the coast, and the command on the Irrawaddy River devolved on Loch. The subsequent action resolved itself into keeping the river clear and driving the Burmese out of such positions as they occupied on its banks.

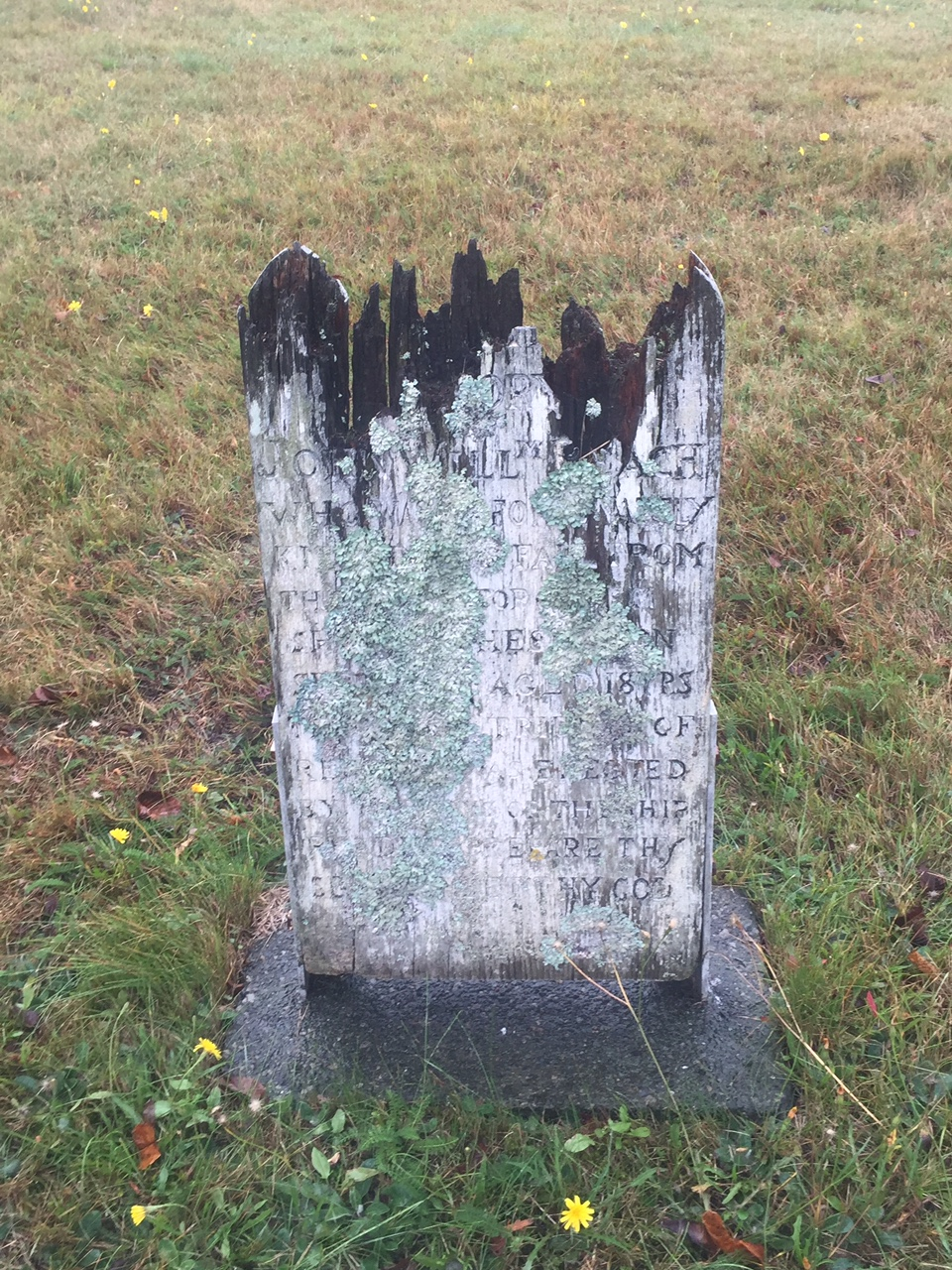
Grave marker of crew that died on HMS Winchester while at Halifax, Royal Navy Burying Ground (Halifax, Nova Scotia)

Rear Admiral Fleetwood Pellew raised his flag aboard Winchester in April 1853, and by September 1854 he was off Hong Kong to take command of the East Indies and China Station. Here he seems to have decided that he would not allow shore leave until the dangerous season for fevers and infections had passed, but neglected to make his reasoning known to his men. The crew were apparently in a mutinous mood, so Pellew ordered them to beat to quarters. When they refused, he sent the officers onto the lower deck to force them up at sword point. Several of the crew were wounded and the nascent mutiny was quashed.

From 11 May 1854 Winchester was the flagship of Rear Admiral Sir James Stirling. Shortly afterwards news arrived that war had been declared on Russia. Stirling was anxious to prevent Russian ships from sheltering in Japanese ports and menacing allied shipping and led a squadron of four vessels to Nagasaki where he concluded the Anglo-Japanese Friendship Treaty with representatives of the Tokugawa shogunate. Winchester subsequently was involved in the Second Opium War, when her boats and some of her ship's company were used in the attack on Canton.

=== Discovery of Russian coast ===
In August 1855, during the Crimean War, Winchester and Barracouta entered and first charted the waters of Peter the Great Gulf, while searching for the Russian squadron commanded by Vasily Zavoyko.

== Training ship Conway ==
From 1861 Winchester replaced the 26-gun sixth-rate HMS Conway as the training ship in the port of Liverpool, and was renamed Conway that year. She was used as an educational vessel for homeless and destitute children. She was replaced in 1876 by HMS Nile, which in turn was renamed Conway. The former Winchester was returned to the Admiralty on 1 September 1876, and was renamed HMS Mount Edgcumbe.

== Training ship Mount Edgcumbe ==
The Devon and Cornwall Industrial Training Ship Association was formed in 1874 to provide a training ship for the homeless boys of Plymouth, and Mount Edgcumbe was anchored in the River Tamar off Saltash. On 28 March 1912 another training ship, HMS Southampton, based in Hull, closed down. The boys aboard HMS Southampton were transferred to Devonport to continue their training aboard Mount Edgcumbe.

The training ship was closed down on 4 December 1920.

== Fate ==
Mount Edgcumbe was sold on 8 April 1921, and was towed to Queen Anne's Battery for breaking.
