= Thames Nautical Training College =

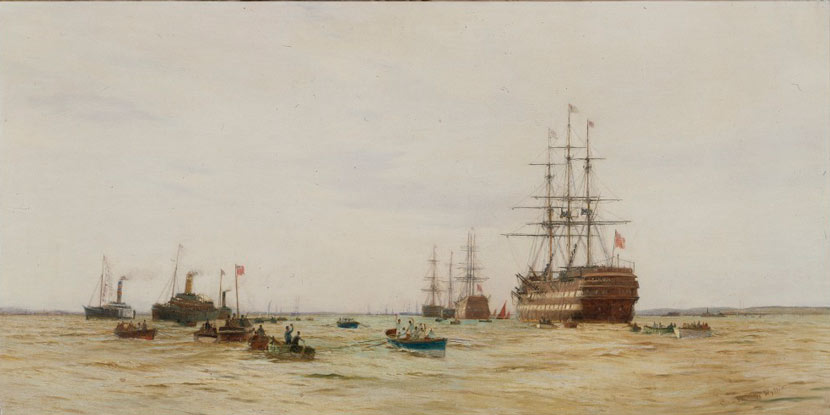
First boat race on the Mersey between cadets of HMS Conway and HMS Worcester, 11 June 1891; by Charles W. Wyllie

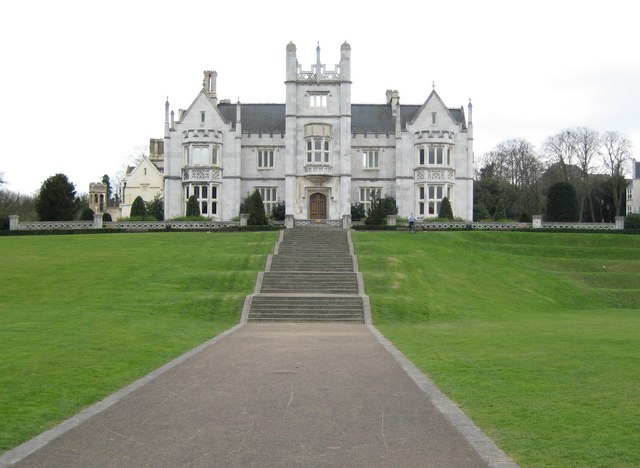
Ingress Abbey at Greenhithe provided shore facilities from 1922.

The Thames Nautical Training College, as it is now called, is a school that trains officers for a seagoing career. It was, for over a hundred years, situated aboard ships named HMS Worcester. London shipowners, marine insurance underwriters and merchants subscribed to its founding. It was the London maritime interests' answer to HMS Conway, which had been established in 1859 on the River Mersey as a training ship for Liverpool's burgeoning merchant fleet. Throughout their history, Worcester and Conway were competitors, and the two met regularly on playing fields and in boats in keen sporting rivalry.

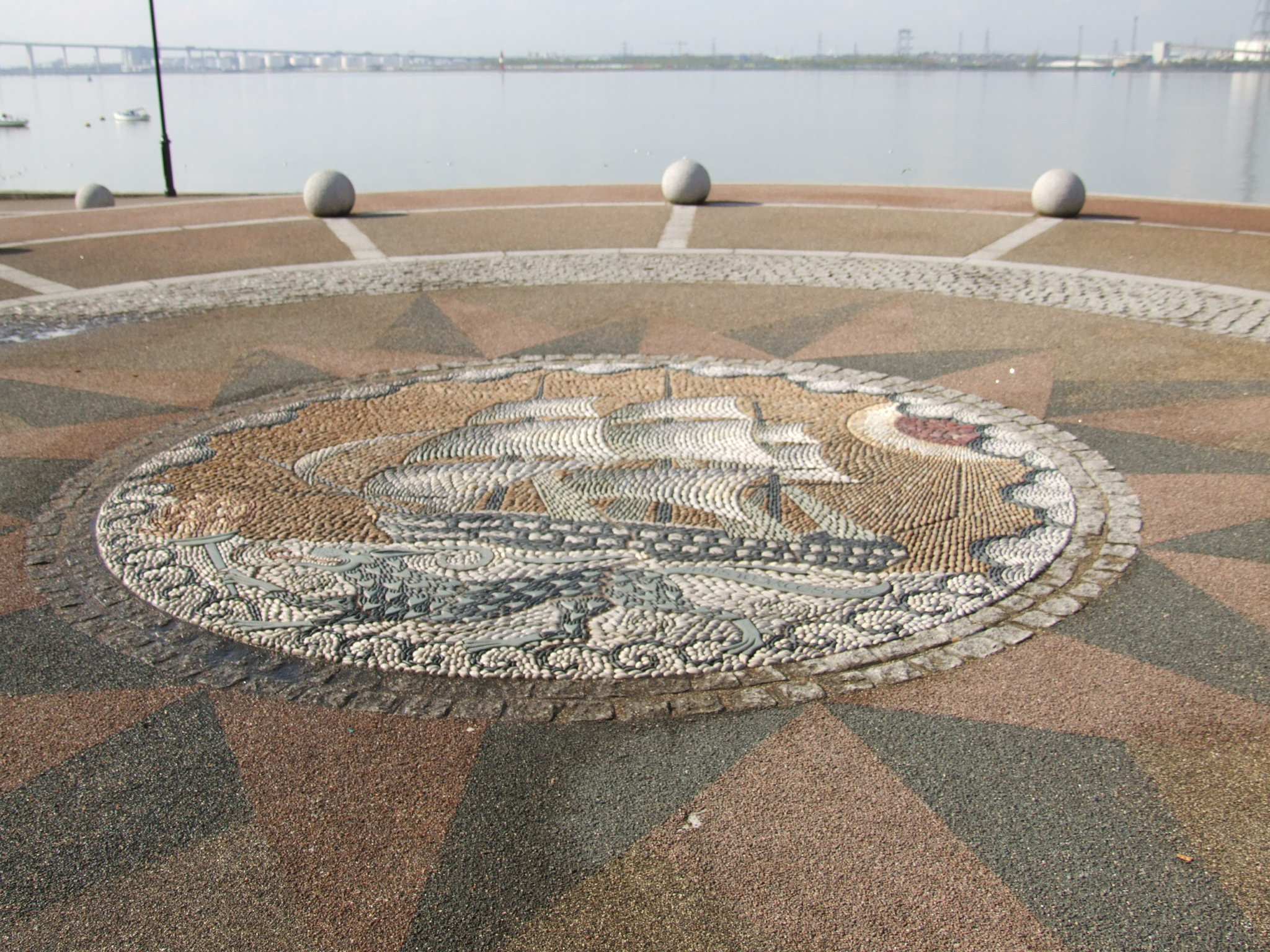
Memorial to the college on the shore of Ingress Park, Greenhithe

The British Admiralty loaned the 50-gun, 1,500-ton frigate HMS Worcester for the scheme, and in 1862 the Thames Marine Officer Training School was opened. She was to find her eventual home off Greenhithe, in the Thames, in 1871, after temporary berths at Blackwall, Erith and Southend. The college expanded, and the Admiralty provided HMS Frederick William (originally laid down as Royal Frederick), a ship-of-the-line of 86 guns with screw propulsion. She was renamed Worcester and refitted in the Victoria Docks before being brought to Greenhithe in 1876. About this time the name of the school was changed to the Incorporated Thames Nautical Training College, HMS Worcester (ITNTC).

David Barker was Captain-Superintendent of the Nautical Training College from 1892 until 1919 and was knighted in 1920.

By 1922 the college had purchased the house and grounds of Ingress Abbey in Greenhithe to provide shore facilities. In 1938, the clipper Cutty Sark was acquired by the college and berthed alongside Worcester and during the Second World War, some seamanship classes were held in her. In 1954 Cutty Sark left Greenhithe to be docked permanently at Greenwich, where she is now a museum ship. With the onset of war in 1939, Worcester cadets moved to Foots Cray Place near Sidcup, and the ship was handed back to the Admiralty. The third Worcester (formerly HMS Exmouth) arrived at Greenhithe in January 1946. She had previously been used as an accommodation ship at Scapa Flow. In 1968 the ITNTC became part of the Merchant Navy College at Greenhithe. Worcester became redundant and was sold to be broken up in Belgium in 1978.

Many Worcester cadets, who automatically became cadets of the Royal Naval Reserve during their time in the ship, entered the Royal Navy and British merchant navy. On leaving Worcester a number rose to the highest ranks of their profession, including those who became commodores of leading merchant fleets. In the period up to 1946, two Victoria Crosses and one George Cross were awarded to former Worcester cadets.

Notable among the college graduates of 1874 was Admiral Tōgō Heihachirō OM GCVO, renowned as the victorious commander-in-chief at the Battle of Tsushima in 1905 and later promoted to Admiral of the Fleet of the Imperial Japanese Navy. Togo credited his victory to the education he received at Thames Marine Officer Training School, and donated his 1905 battle flag to HMS Worcester when he attended the coronation of George V in 1911.

In 1876 Queen Victoria confirmed her interest in the ship by establishing the award of an annual Gold Medal to the cadet who, in the opinion of his shipmates, was most likely to make the best officer.

== See also ==
- School ship
- HMS Worcester for other ships of the same name
- The Marine Society College of the Sea
