= English ship Sovereign of the Seas =

17th-century warship of the English Navy

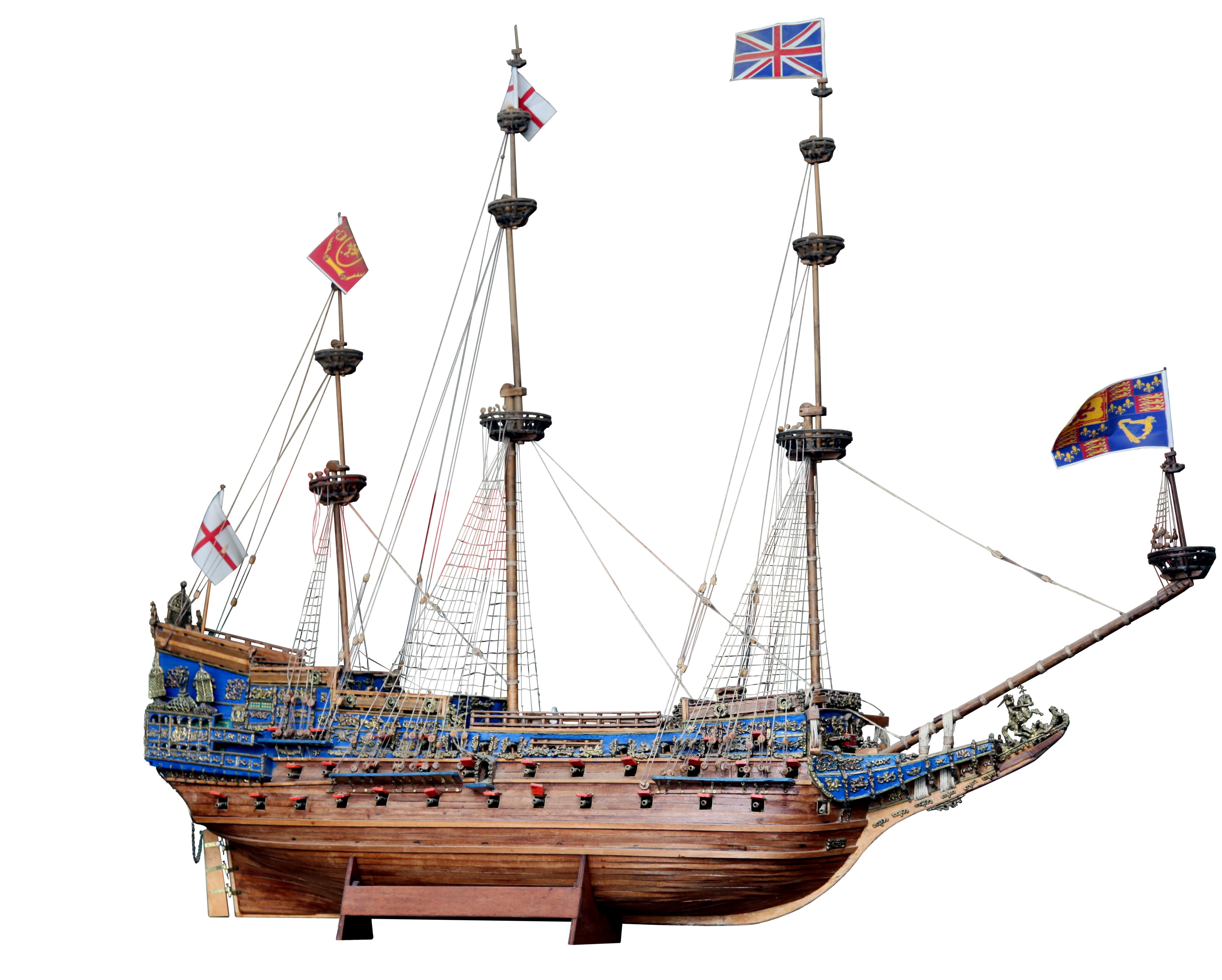
- Ship model of Sovereign of the Seas

History

England
- Name: Sovereign of the Seas
- Ordered: 7 May 1635
- Builder: Peter Pett, Woolwich Dockyard
- Laid down: 21 December 1635
- Launched: 13 October 1637
- Renamed: Sovereign, 1650; Royal Sovereign, 1660
- Fate: Burnt, 1697
- Notes: Participated in: Battle of Kentish Knock; Battle of Beachy Head; Battle of La Hogue; Four Days' Battle; St James' Day Battle

General characteristics as built
- Class & type: 102-gun first-rate ship of the line
- Tons burthen: 1522 bm
- Length: 127 ft (39 m) (keel)
- Beam: 46 ft 6 in (14.17 m)
- Depth of hold: 19 ft 4 in (5.89 m)
- Propulsion: Sails
- Sail plan: Full-rigged ship
- Armament: 90 guns (ordered); 102 guns (launched): Lower deck; Broadside 20 × cannon drakes (42-pdrs); Stern chasers 4 × demi-cannon drakes (32-pdrs); Bow chasers 2 × demi-cannon drakes (32-pdrs); Luffs 2 × demi-cannon drakes (32-pdrs); Middle deck; Broadside 22 × culverin drakes (18-pdrs); 2 × demi-culverin drakes (9-pdrs); Stern chasers 4 × culverins (18-pdrs); Bow chasers 2 × culverins (18-pdrs); Upper deck; Broadside 22 × demi-culverin drakes (9-pdrs); Stern chasers 2 × demi-culverins (9-pdrs); Bow chasers 2 × demi-culverins (9-pdrs); Quarter deck; 6 × demi-culverin drakes (9-pdrs); Poop deck; 2 × demi-culverin drakes (9-pdrs); Forecastle; 8 × demi-culverin drakes (9-pdrs); 2 × culverin drakes (18-pdrs); 90 guns (1642); 100 guns (1660).

General characteristics after 1659-60 rebuilding
- Class & type: 100-gun first-rate ship of the line
- Tons burthen: 1,54560/94 bm
- Length: 167 ft 9 in (51.13 m) (on gundeck), 127 ft (39 m) (keel)
- Beam: 47 ft 10 in (14.58 m)
- Depth of hold: 19 ft 4 in (5.89 m)
- Propulsion: Sails
- Sail plan: Full-rigged ship
- Armament: 100 guns of various weights of shot

General characteristics after 1680-85 rebuild
- Class & type: 100-gun first-rate ship of the line
- Tons burthen: 1,60542/94 bm
- Length: 167 ft 9 in (51.13 m) (gundeck), 131 ft (40 m) (keel)
- Beam: 48 ft 0 in (14.63 m)
- Depth of hold: 19 ft 2 in (5.84 m)
- Propulsion: Sails
- Sail plan: Full-rigged ship
- Armament: 100 guns of various weights of shot

Sovereign of the Seas was a 17th-century warship of the English Navy. She was ordered as a 90-gun first-rate ship of the line, but at launch was armed with 102 bronze guns at the insistence of the king. She was later renamed Sovereign under the republican Commonwealth, and then HMS Royal Sovereign at the Restoration of Charles II.

The elaborately gilded stern ordered by Charles I of England led the Dutch to nickname her as the "Golden Devil". She was launched on 13 October 1637, and served from 1638 until 1697, when a fire burnt the ship to the waterline at Chatham.

== History ==
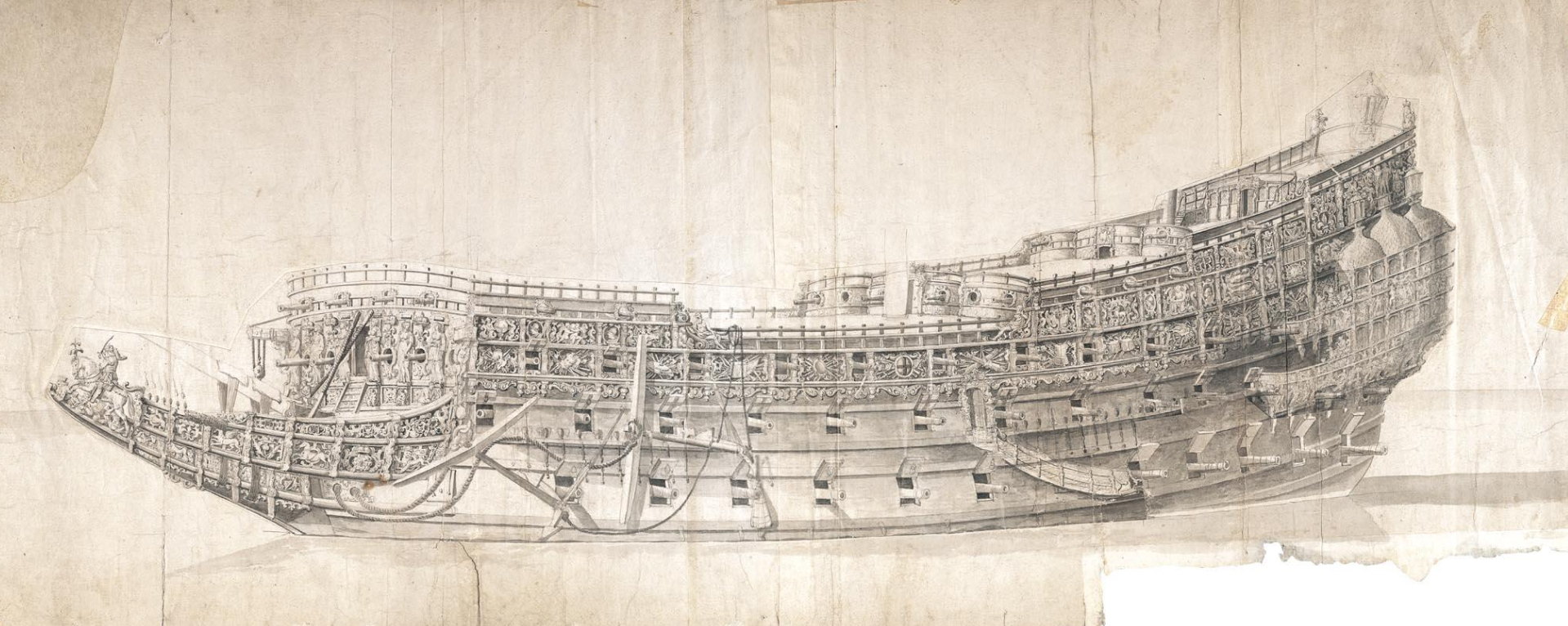
The Morgan-Drawing by Willem van de Velde the Younger

The planning of a new First Rate was asked for in June 1634 on the personal initiative of Charles I of England, as a prestige project. The decision provoked much opposition from the Brethren of Trinity House, who pointed out that "There is no port in the Kingdome that can harbour this ship. The wild sea must be her port, her anchors and cables her safety; if either fail, the ship must perish, the King lose his jewel, four or five hundred man must die, and perhaps some great and noble peer".

These objections were overcome with the help of Admiral Sir John Pennington, and the ship was ordered in May 1635, with the keel being laid down on 21 December. Construction was supervised by Peter Pett, later a Commissioner of the Navy, guided by his father Phineas, the royal shipwright, and the ship was launched at Woolwich Dockyard on 13 October 1637. As the second three-decked first-rate (the first three-decker being the Prince Royal of 1610), she was the predecessor of Nelson's Victory, although the Revenge, built in 1577 by Mathew Baker, was the inspiration for her, providing the innovation of a single deck devoted entirely to broadside guns.

The most extravagantly decorated warship in the Royal Navy, she was adorned from stern to bow with gilded carvings against a black background, designed by Anthony van Dyck, and made by John Christmas and Mathias Christmas. Construction costs of £65,586 was funded by ship money, the gilding alone being £6,691, the price of an average warship. For comparison, the total tax generated in 1637 was £208,000.

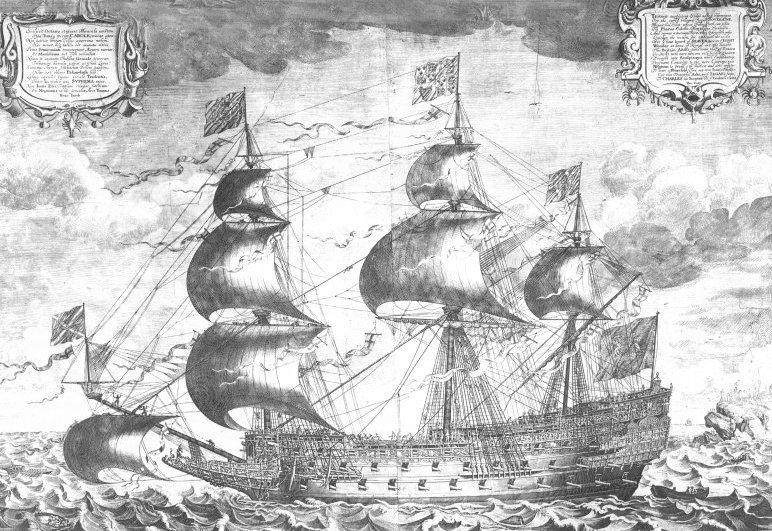
'The true portrait of His Majesty's royal ship the Sovereign of the Seas', a contemporaneous engraving by J. Payne

Charles ordered 102 bronze cannon, to ensure it was the most powerfully armed ship in the world; these were made by John Browne. Sovereign of the Seas had 118 gun ports and only 102 guns. The shape of the bow meant that the foremost gun ports on the lower gun deck were blocked by the anchor cable. Consequently, the fore chase – the guns facing forward – occupied the next ports. There were two demi-cannon drakes – one port, one starboard – some 11.5 feet (3.5 m) long, weighing together five tons (5000 kg). They had a bore of 6.4 to 6.75 inches (16.3 to 17.1 centimetres) and fired a shot weighing 32 to 36 pounds (15 to 16 kilograms), using around ten pounds of gunpowder.

In the third ports from the bow, there were two 11-foot (3.4 m) demi-cannon drakes weighing, together, 4.3 tons (4300 kg). Behind them were twenty cannon drakes, nine feet long, and weighing in all 45.7 tons (45700 kg). In the third port from the stern were two more 11-foot (3.4 m) demi-cannon drakes weighing, together, 4.3 tons (4300 kg). The last two ports on either side were occupied by the stern chase – four 10.5-foot (3.2 m) demi-cannon drakes weighing a total of 11.4 tons (11400 kg).

The middle gun deck had heavy fortified culverins – that is, guns short for their bore – fore and aft. There were two 11.5-foot (3.5 m) pieces, weighing 4.8 tons (4800 kg), in the fore chase; four 11.5-foot (3.5 m) pieces, weighing 10.2 tons (10200 kg), in the stern chase. Immediately behind the fore chase were two demi-culverin drakes, eight to nine feet (2.4 to 2.7 m) long, weighing some 1.9 tons (1900 kg). Then came twenty-two 9.5-foot (2.9 m) culverin drakes weighing a total of 30.4 tons (30400 kg).

On the upper gun deck there were two 10-foot (3.0 m) fortified demi-culverins in the fore chase and two in the stern chase, both pairs weighing 2.8 tons (2800 kg). Between them there were twenty-two demi-culverin drakes, eight to nine feet (2.4 to 2.7 m) long, weighing over 21 tons (21000 kg) in total.

There were eight eight-to-nine-foot (2.4 to 2.7 m) demi-culverin drakes weighing 7.7 tons (7700 kg) in the forecastle; another six weighing 5.7 tons (5700 kg) on the half-deck. The quarterdeck carried two six-foot demi-culverin drake cutts – a cutt, again, being a shorter version of a gun – weighing 16 hundredweight (726 kg). Then there were another two six-foot culverin cutts, weighing 1.3 tons (1,179 kg), aft of the forecastle bulkhead. In all, Sovereign of the Seas carried 155.9 tons (141,430 kg) of guns – and that did not include the weight of the gun carriages. Altogether they cost £26,441 13s 6d including £3 per piece to have the Tudor rose, a crown and the motto: Carolvs Edgari sceptrvm aqvarum – "Charles has established Edgar’s sceptre of the waters" – engraved on them. The gun carriages, made by Matthew Banks, Master Carpenter for the Office of Ordinance, cost another £558 11s 8d.

By 1642, her armament had been reduced to 90 guns. Until 1655, she was also exceptionally large for an English vessel; no other ships of Charles were larger than Prince Royal.

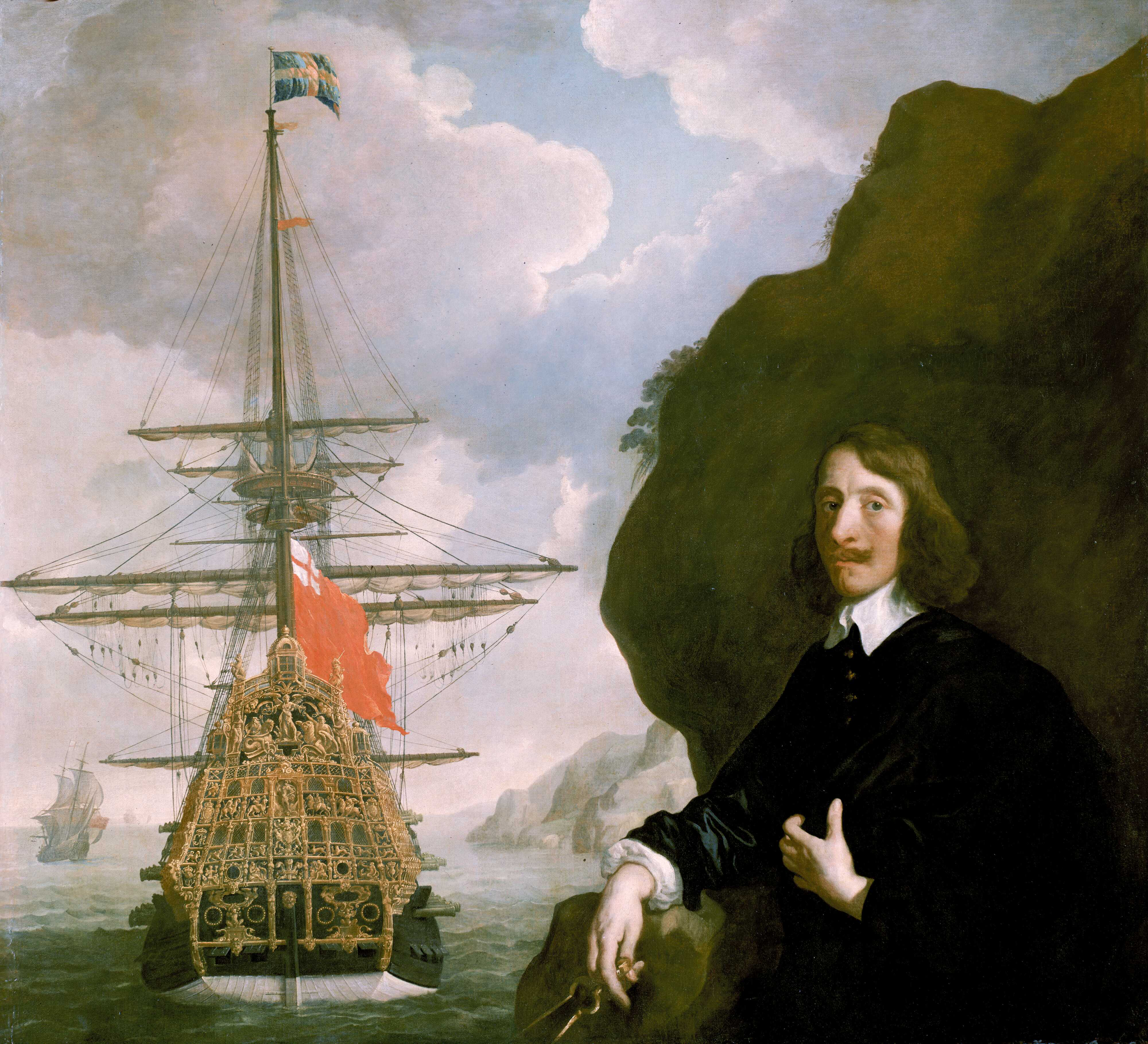
c. 1645–1650 painting of Sovereign of the Seas and Pett by Sir Peter Lely

Sovereign of the Seas was not so much built because of tactical considerations but as an attempt to bolster Charles' reputation. Her name was, in itself, a political statement as Charles tried to revive the perceived ancient right of English monarchs to be recognised as the "lords of the seas", with Royal Navy warships demanding that other ships strike their colours in salute even in foreign ports. Dutch legal thinker Hugo Grotius, who had been imprisoned in Holland and escaped to France to continue writing, had argued for a mare liberum, a sea free to be used by all. Such a concept was mainly favourable to Dutch trade; in reaction, John Selden and William Monson published the book Mare Clausum ("the Closed Sea") in 1635, with special permission of Charles, which attempted to prove that Edgar the Peaceable had already been recognised as Rex Marium, or "sovereign of the seas" – this book had been previously repressed by James I. The name of the ship explicitly referred to this dispute; King Edgar was the central theme of the transom carvings.

Rear-Admiral Sir William Symonds noted that after the ship's launch she was "cut down" and made a safe and fast ship. In the time of the Commonwealth of England all ships named after royalty were renamed; it was first decided to change the name of the ship into Commonwealth, but in 1650 it became a simple Sovereign. In 1651 she was again made more manoeuvrable by reducing upperworks after which she was described as "a delicate frigate (I think the whole world hath not her like)". She served throughout the wars of the Commonwealth and became the flagship of General at Sea Robert Blake. She was involved in all of the great English naval conflicts fought against the United Provinces and France and was referred to as 'The Golden Devil' (den Gulden Duvel) by the Dutch.

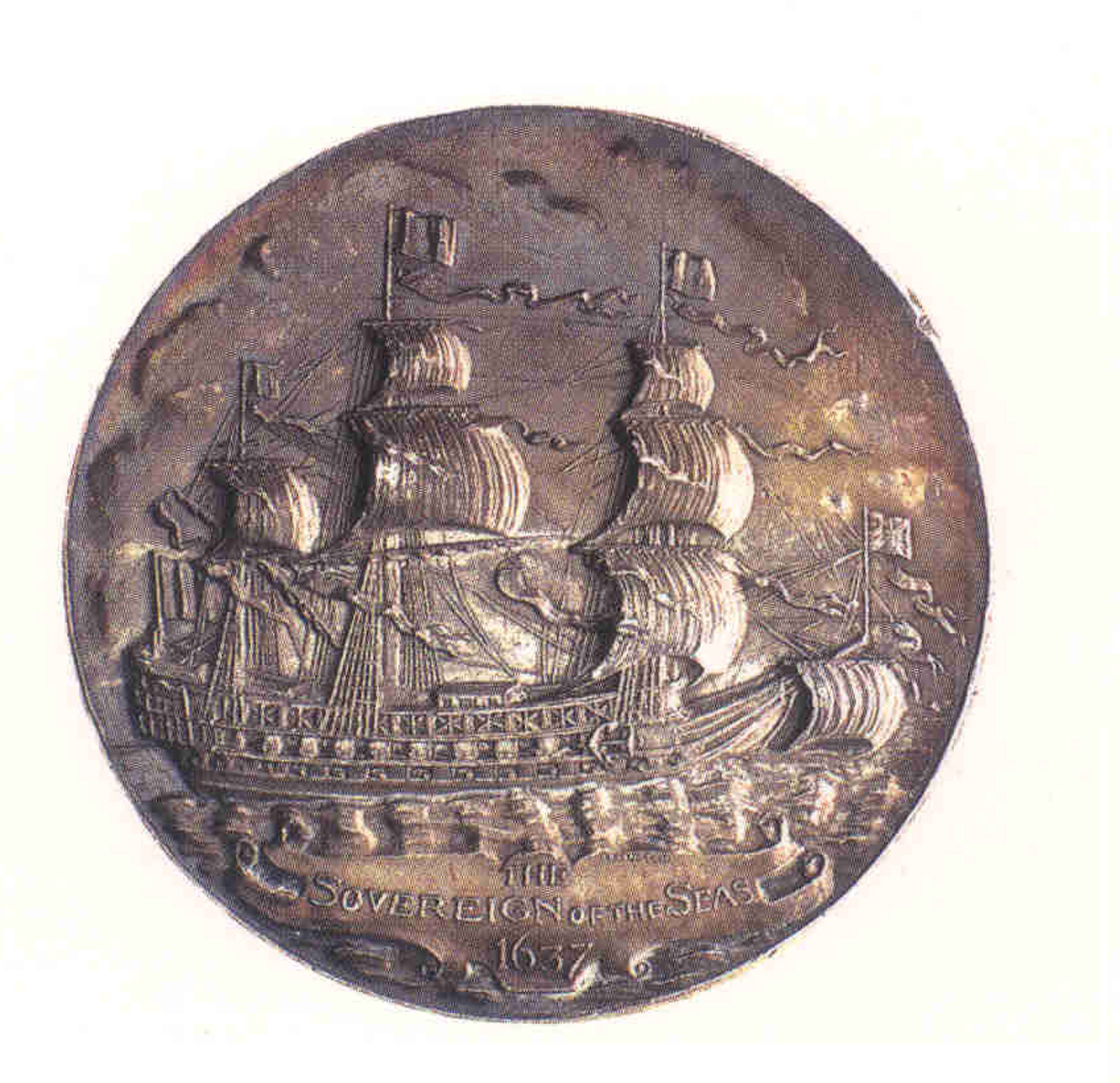
Medal on Sovereign of the Seas

When, during the First Anglo-Dutch War, on 21 October 1652 the States General of the Netherlands in a secret session determined the reward money for the crews of fire ships that succeeded in destroying an enemy vessel, Sovereign was singled out: an extra prize of 3,000 guilders was promised 'in case they should ruin the ship named the Sovereign'. The ship had not seen action during the Civil War, remaining laid up. After being refitted in 1651, she had her first fight in the Battle of the Kentish Knock, armed with 106 guns. In this battle she ran aground on the Kentish Knock itself. She remained in service for nearly sixty years as the best ship in the English navy. By 1660 her armament had been changed to 100 guns. She was rebuilt at Chatham Dockyard from 1659 to 1660 as a first-rate ship of the line of 100 guns in wartime (92 in peacetime) with flatter gundecks and renamed Royal Sovereign prior to her re-launch; most of the carvings had been removed.

She was present at the St. James's Day Battle of 25 July 1666, fighting the Dutch fleet in the North Sea.

She was smaller than Naseby (later renamed Royal Charles), but she was in regular service during the three Anglo-Dutch Wars, surviving the Raid on the Medway in 1667 by being at Portsmouth at the time. She underwent a second rebuild from 1680 to 1685 at Chatham Dockyard, relaunching as a first rate of 100 guns, before taking part in the outset of the War of the Grand Alliance. For the first time she ventured into the Irish Sea, and later participated in the Battle of Beachy Head (1690) and the Battle of La Hougue (1692), when she was more than fifty years old. In that period she was the first ship in history that flew royals above her topgallant sails and a topgallant sail on the jigger-mast.

== Destruction ==
Sovereign became leaky and defective with age during the reign of William III, and was laid up at Chatham Dockyards for repairs late in 1695.

She ignominiously ended her days, in mid January 1696, by being burnt to the water line as a result of having been set on fire by accident (it was 1697 in continental Europe, as the Gregorian calendar was in use there). A bosun, who was on night watch, left a candle burning unattended. Admitting to his fault he was court-martialled on 27 January 1696 and not only publicly flogged but also imprisoned at Marshalsea for the rest of his life.

In her honour, naval tradition has kept the name of this ship afloat, and several subsequent ships have been named HMS Royal Sovereign.

== In popular culture ==
Thomas Carew's poem "Upon the Royal Ship called the 'Sovereign of the Seas', built by Peter Pett, Master Builder; His Father, Captain Phineas Pett, Supervisor: 1637" is a paean to the vessel, calling it the eighth wonder of the world:

... Monarchal Ship, whose Fabrick doth outpride
The Pharos, Colosse, Memphique Pyramide...
We y^{t} have heard of Seaven, now see y^{e} Eight
Wonder at home; of Naual art the height...
Neptune is proud o'th burden, and doth wonder
To hear a Fourefold Fire out-rore Iouv's Thunder ...

Model of Sovereign of the Seas
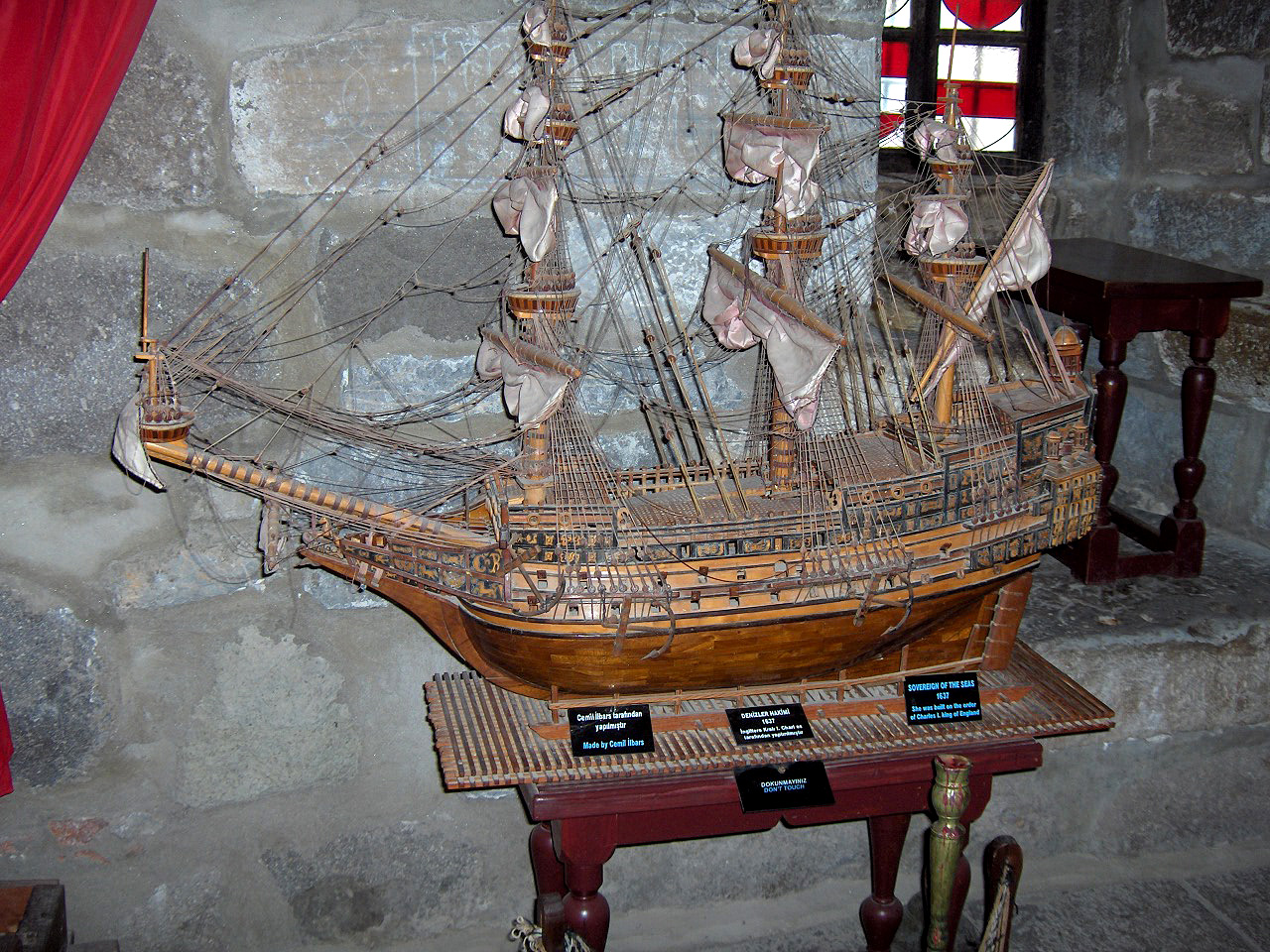
Model of Sovereign of the Seas on display in the Bodrum Museum of Underwater Archaeology, Bodrum, Turkey, with royals

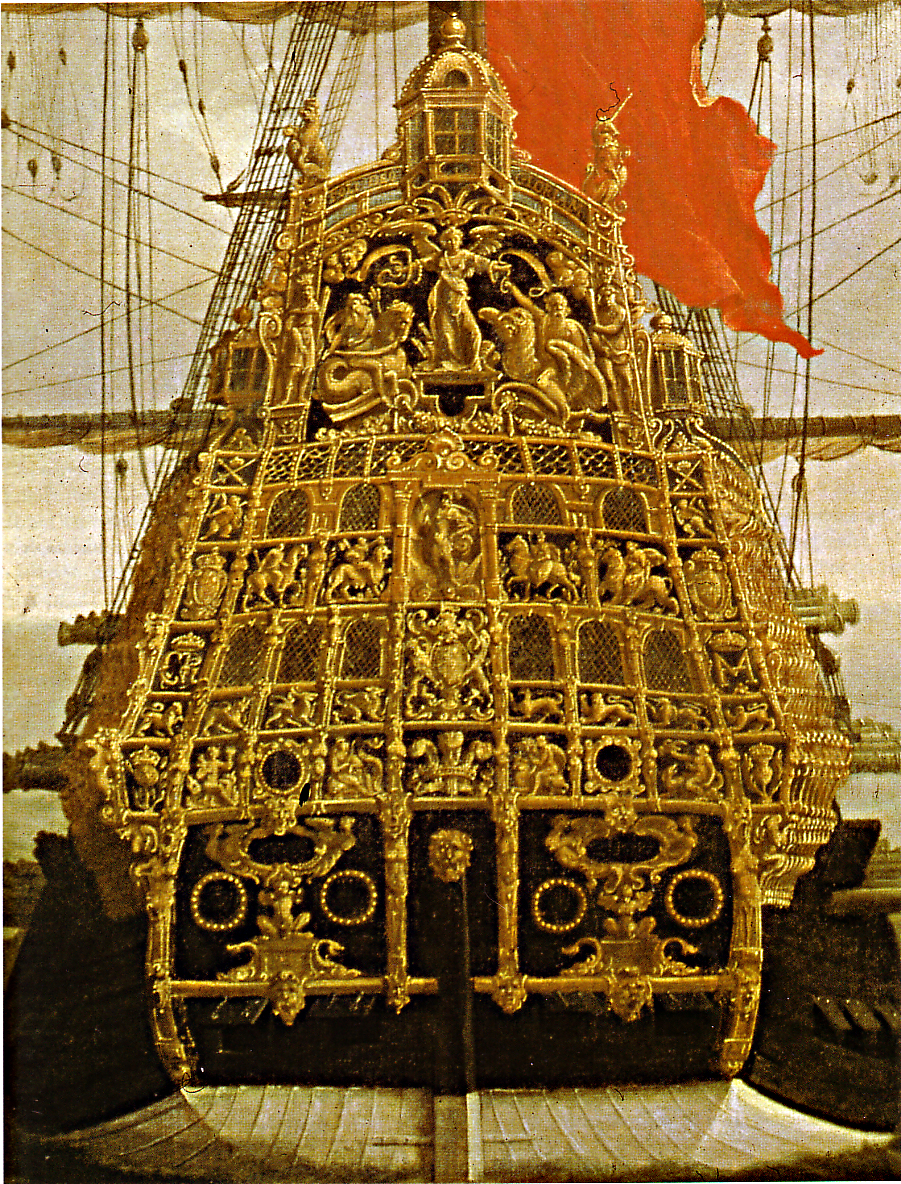
Stern of Sovereign of the Seas

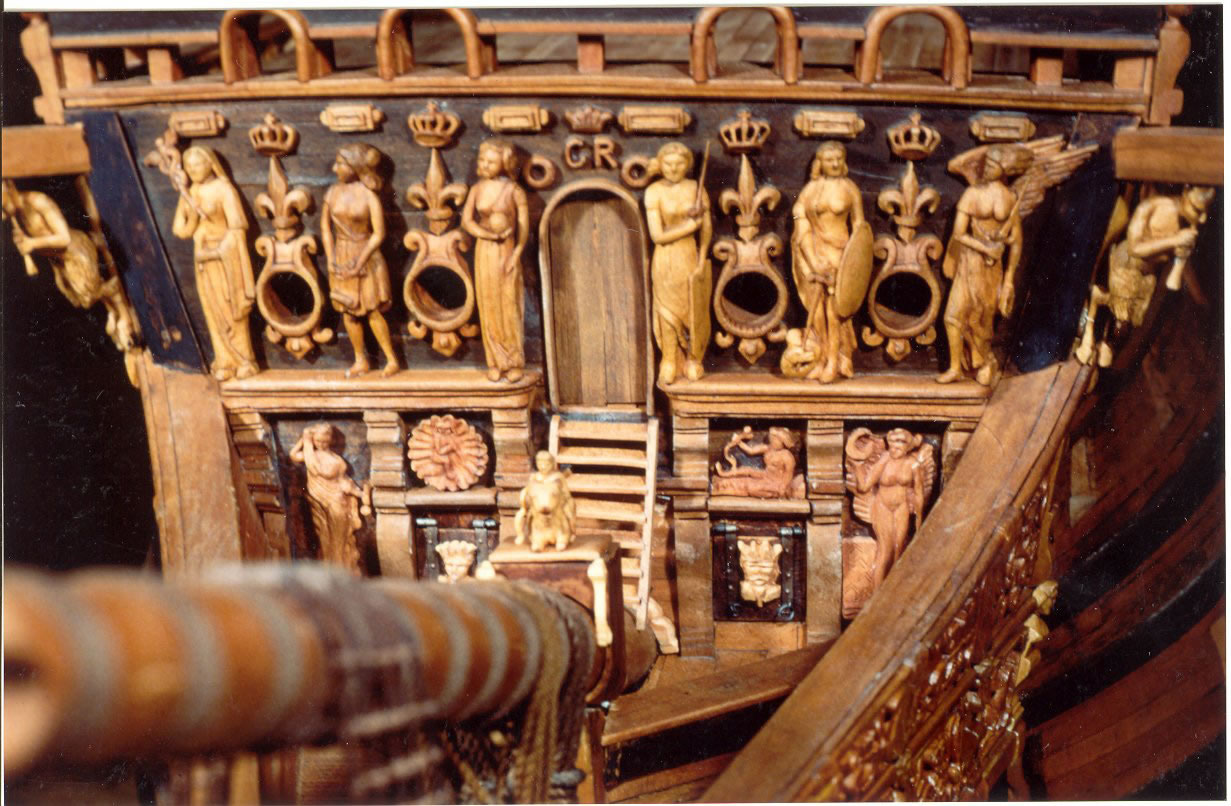
Carvings on Sovereign of the Seas' beakhead bulkhead

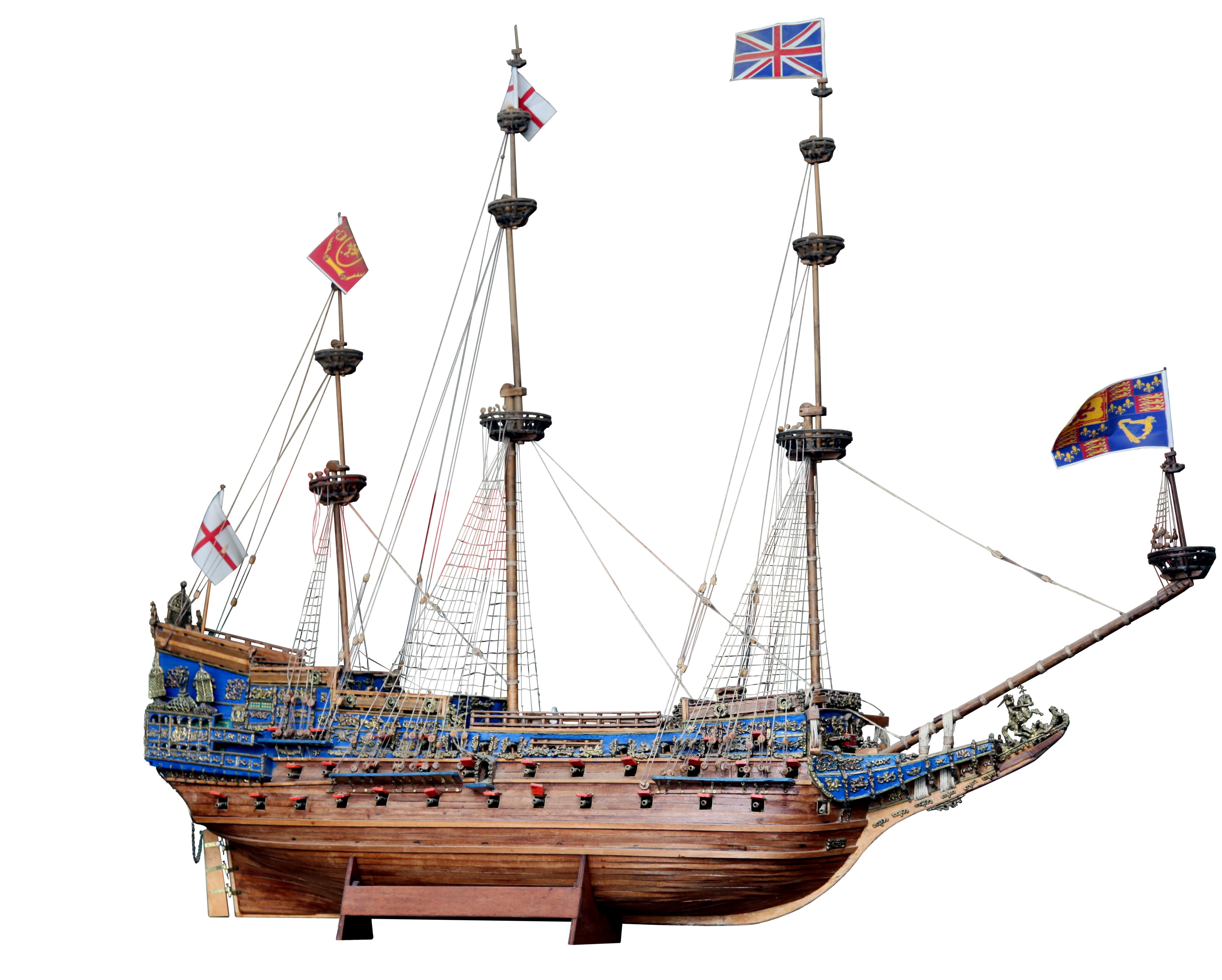

== See also ==
- List of world's largest wooden ships

== Sources ==
- Sovereign of the Seas. Retrieved 22 December 2007.
- Berckman, Evelyn (1974). Creators and Destroyers of the English Navy. Hamish Hamilton. ISBN 978-0241890349.
- Lavery, Brian (1983) The Ship of the Line – Volume 1: The development of the battlefleet 1650–1850. Conway Maritime Press. ISBN 0-85177-252-8.
- Winfield, Rif (2009). British Warships in the Age of Sail 1603–1714: Design, Construction, Careers and Fates. Seaforth Publishing. ISBN 978-1-84832-040-6..
