= HMS Worcester (1843) =

Frigate of the Royal Navy

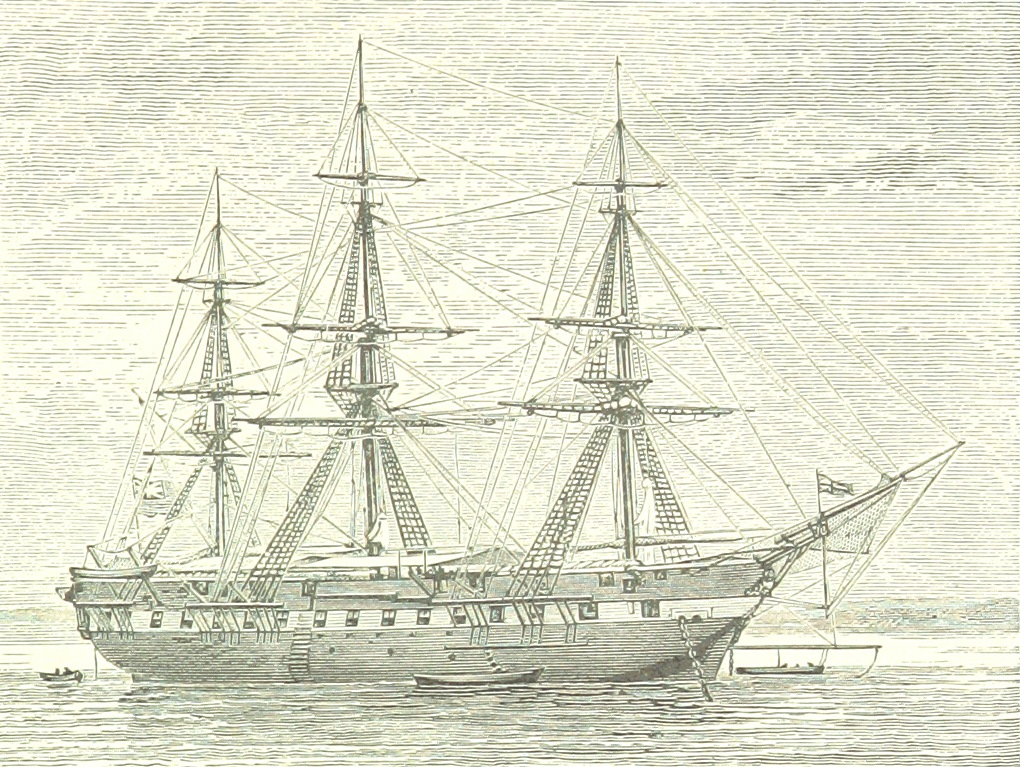
Worcester at Purfleet on the Thames in c.1887.

HMS Worcester was a 52-gun 1,500 ton fourth rate frigate of the Royal Navy, the last of six Southampton class ships built, and the fifth naval ship to bear the name. Ordered in 1818, she was laid down in Deptford Dockyard in 1820 but then delayed, spending 23 years on the stocks before being launched on 10 October 1843 and completed at Sheerness Dockyard in November.

The Worcester was laid up in the Nore by the 1860s when the Royal Navy was starting to replace their fleet of surplus 'wooden walls' with iron clad vessels. Then in 1862, London ship owners seeking to found a training college approached the Admiralty for the loan of a suitable ship, and so she was lent as a training ship to form the Thames Marine Officer Training School (later known as the Thames Nautical Training College), with nearly £1,000 spent on her conversion. In that role she was moored on the Thames at Blackwall Reach, Erith by 1863, at Southend in 1869 and finally at Greenhithe in 1871.

By the mid-1870s the Worcester had become too small for the growing number of cadets, and so she was sold for breaking up in 1885 and succeeded by the renamed ex-HMS Frederick William.
