= The Marine Society College of the Sea =

Coordinates: 51.4955°N 0.1164°W

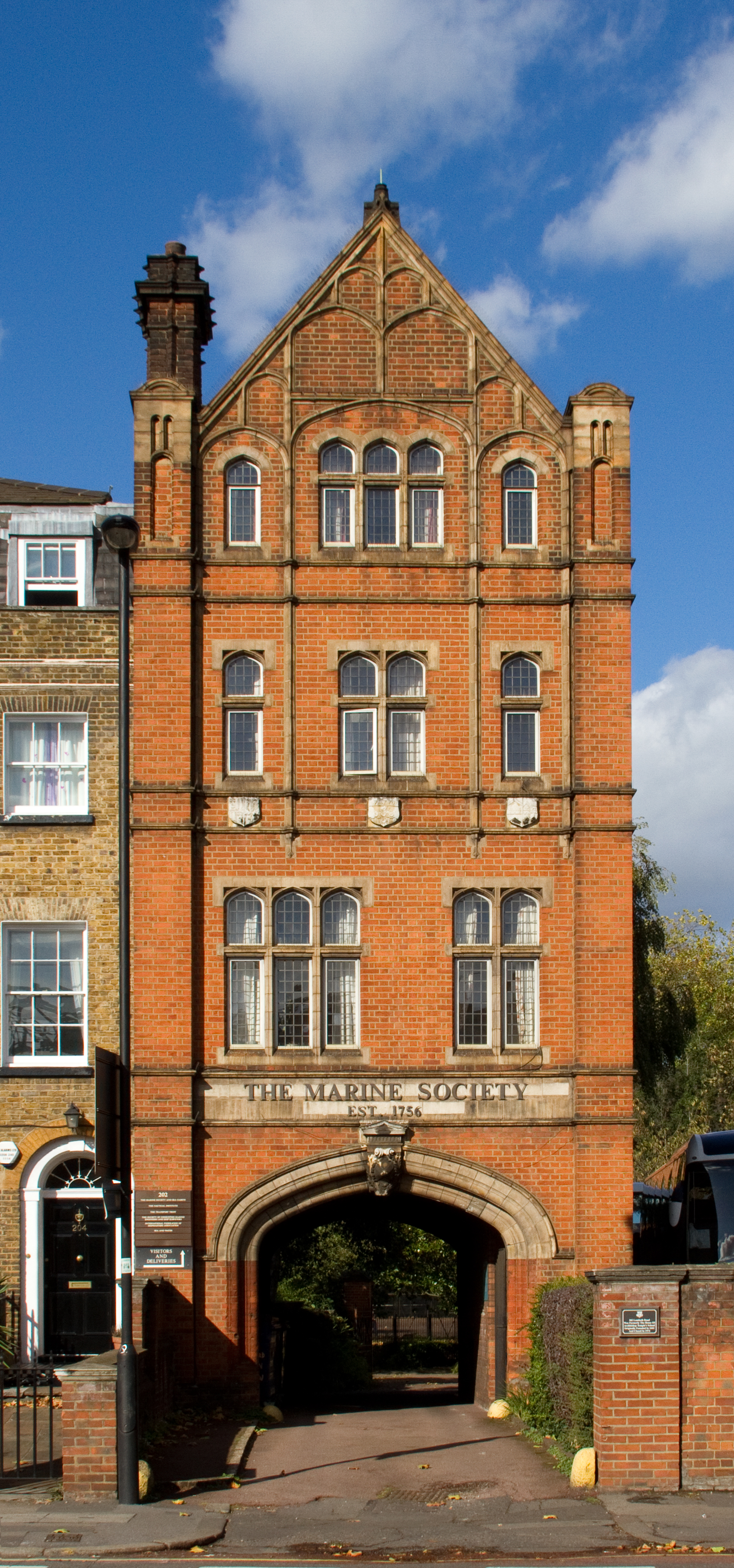
The Marine Society College of the Sea

The Marine Society College of the Sea is a distance learning further education college for those who make their living at sea. The college is owned and operated by The Marine Society, and is located at 202 Lambeth Road, in the London Borough of Lambeth.

== Description ==
The college is used by members of the Royal Navy and the British Merchant Navy, as well as all seafarers – wherever they may serve and in whatever capacity. Courses offered by the college include GCSEs, A Levels, short adult education courses, and specialised diplomas relating to shipping. There is also a range of higher education courses offered in conjunction with City University London, Middlesex University and the Open University.

The colleges provision is focused on the needs of seafarers and shore-based maritime professionals, and is provided via a range of services which are designed to enhance learning and well-being, and to facilitate professional development.
