= HMS Worcester =

Eight ships and a training establishment of the Royal Navy have borne the name HMS Worcester, after the English city of Worcester:

- English ship Worcester (1651) was a 48-gun ship launched in 1651. She was renamed HMS Dunkirk in 1660.
- HMS Worcester (1698) was a 50-gun ship launched in 1698. She was rebuilt in 1714 and broken up in 1744.
- HMS Worcester (1735) was a 60-gun fourth rate launched in 1735 and broken up by 1765.
- HMS Worcester (1769) was a 64-gun third rate launched in 1769. She was hulked in 1788 and broken up in 1816.
- HMS Worcester (1843) was a 52-gun fourth rate launched in 1843 after spending 23 years on the stocks. She was lent as a training ship in 1862 and broken up in 1885.
- HMS Worcester (D96), the eighth to bear the name, was a W-class destroyer launched in 1919. She was damaged by a mine in 1943 and not repaired. Instead she became an accommodation ship in 1944 and was renamed HMS Yeoman in 1945. She was sold in 1946 and broken up in 1947.
- HMS Worcester was also the name given to the Thames Nautical Training College. It was established in 1862 aboard the fifth HMS Worcester. The name HMS Worcester ceased to be associated with the establishment after 1968. Several ships have been named or renamed HMS Worcester whilst serving with the establishment:
  - Its first, the fifth-named HMS Worcester (1843), served as the college from 1862 to 1876.
  - Its second, the sixth-named HMS Worcester, was the ex-HMS Frederick William (1860) and served the college from 1876 to 1948.
  - Its third, the seventh-named HMS Worcester, was the ex-HMS Exmouth (1905) and served the college from 1945 to 1968.

== Battle honours ==
Ships of the Royal Navy named Worcester have earned the following battle honours;

- Dover, 1652
- Portland, 1653
- Gabbard, 1653
- Scheveningen, 1653
- Porto Farina, 1653
- Santa Cruz, 1657
- Porto Bello, 1739
- Cartagena, 1741
- Ushant, 1778
- Sadras, 1782
- Providien, 1782
- Negapatam, 1782
- Trincomalee, 1782
- Cuddalore, 1783
- Dunkirk, 1940
- Atlantic, 1940
- North Sea, 1942–1943
- Dover Straits, 1942
- English Channel, 1942
- Arctic, 1943

== See also ==
- HMS Worcester Prize, a 14-gun sixth rate captured from the French in 1705 by HMS Worcester. She was briefly in French hands in 1708, but was recaptured, only to be recaptured for the final time by the French later that year.
- HMS Worcestershire, an armed merchant cruiser and landing ship, infantry during the Second World War
