= Institute of Cast Metals Engineers =

British engineering organization

- Abbreviation: ICME
- Formation: 1904
- Legal status: Non-profit organisation
- Purpose: Foundries in the UK
- Location: 47 Birmingham Road, West Bromwich
- Region served: UK
- Website: Institute of Cast Metals Engineers

The Institute of Cast Metals Engineers (ICME), originally the British Foundrymen's Association is a British professional engineering institution founded in 1904. It publishes the Foundry Trade Journal, which was established in 1902.

== History ==
It was founded as the British Foundrymen's Association in 1904. It was given a Royal Charter on 25 November 1921 and became the Institute of British Foundrymen. On 11 October 2000, it changed its name to the Institute of Cast Metals Engineers.

== Structure ==
It is licensed by the Engineering Council to assess candidates for inclusion on its Register of professional Engineers and Technicians. The Institute's address is ICME Metalforming Centre, 47 Birmingham Road, West Bromwich, West Midlands, B70 6PY, United Kingdom.

== See also ==
- Chartered engineer
- Incorporated engineer
- Engineering technician
- Worshipful Company of Founders
