= Southampton-class frigate (1820) =

Class overview
- Built: 1817–1843
- In commission: 1821–1889
- Completed: 6

General characteristics
- Type: Fourth-rate sailing frigate
- Tons burthen: 1,468 11/94 bm (as designed)
- Length: 172 ft (52 m) (gundeck); 144 ft 9 in (44 m) (keel)
- Beam: 44 ft 3.25 in (13 m)
- Depth of hold: 14 ft 6 in (4 m)
- Sail plan: Full-rigged ship
- Complement: 450
- Armament: As built: UD: 30 × 24-pdr guns; QD & FC: 16 × 42-pdr carronades and 6 × 24-pdr guns; Re-armed: UD: 26 × 32-pdr guns; QD & FC: 20 × 32-pdr guns and 4 × 8-inch shell guns; Except Worcester: UD: 30 × 32-pdr guns; QD & FC: 16 × 32-pdr carronades, 4 × 24-pdr guns & 2 × 12-pdrs

The Southampton-class frigates launched from 1820 onwards were 52-gun sailing frigates of the fourth rate produced for the Royal Navy following the close of the Napoleonic War. They were designed in 1816 to carry sixty guns, but were completed with fifty-two guns only. The design, a joint effort by the Surveyors of the Navy, was modified from that of the Java launched in 1815.

A total of four ships were ordered on 23 May 1816, with two more in 1817 and 1818; however the last pair were delayed and were not launched until 1843 with a substantially altered armament. Two further ships were ordered to a very slightly enlarged version of this design in 1825, to have been built at Plymouth Dockyard as Liverpool and Jamaica, but were cancelled on 5 March 1829 without ever being laid down.

== Ships in class ==
- Southampton
  - Ordered: 23 May 1816
  - Built by: Deptford Dockyard.
  - Keel laid: March 1817
  - Launched: 7 November 1820
  - Completed: 11 May 1821.
  - Fate: Became a Coastguard vessel in 1857 and a training ship in 1867. Sold to break up on 26 June 1912.
- Portland
  - Ordered: 23 May 1816
  - Built by: Plymouth Dockyard.
  - Keel laid: August 1817
  - Launched: 8 May 1822
  - Completed: 20 August 1833.
  - Fate: Sold to break up on 19 May 1862.
- Lancaster
  - Ordered: 23 May 1816
  - Built by: Plymouth Dockyard.
  - Keel laid: 18 July 1818
  - Launched: 23 August 1823
  - Completed: 8 October 1823.
  - Fate: Never commissioned; fitted out to become a fever hospital ship but was never used. Sold to break up at Plymouth on 17 February 1864.
- Winchester
  - Ordered: 23 May 1816
  - Built by: Woolwich Dockyard.
  - Keel laid: November 1818
  - Launched: 21 June 1822
  - Completed: 16 September 1822.
  - Fate: Became training ship Conway at Liverpool in November 1861, renamed Mount Edgcumbe on 1 September 1876. Sold to break up on 8 April 1921.
- Chichester
  - Ordered: 23 July 1817
  - Built by: Woolwich Dockyard.
  - Keel laid: July 1827
  - Launched: 12 July 1843
  - Completed: 23 February 1844.
  - Fate: Became training ship at Greenhithe in 1866. Sold to break up in May 1889.
- Worcester
  - Ordered: 21 July 1818
  - Built by: Deptford Dockyard.
  - Keel laid: December 1820
  - Launched: 10 October 1843
  - Completed: November 1843 at Sheerness Dockyard.
  - Fate: Became training ship at Greenhithe in 1862. Sold to break up in August 1885.
