= HMS Frederick William =

Ship of the line of the Royal Navy

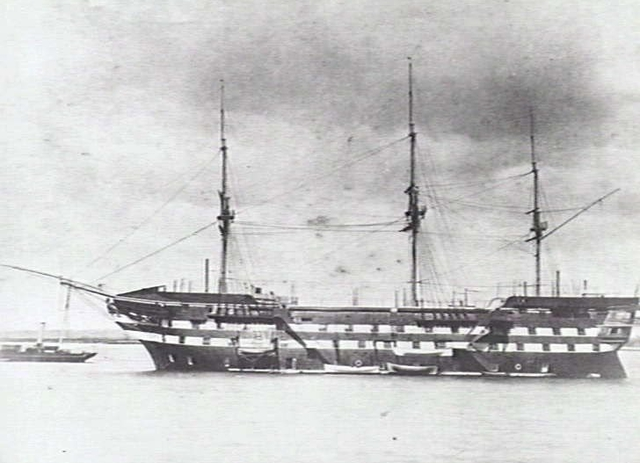
- As Worcester

History

United Kingdom
- Name: Frederick William
- Namesake: Crown Prince Friedrich Wilhelm of Prussia
- Ordered: 12 September 1833 (as Royal Sovereign); 29 June 1848 (as modified Queen class); 28 February 1857 (as screw battleship)
- Builder: HM Dockyard, Portsmouth
- Laid down: July 1841
- Launched: 24 March 1860
- Commissioned: 1 July 1864
- Renamed: Originally ordered as Royal Sovereign; Renamed Royal Frederick on 12 April 1839; Renamed Frederick William on 28 January 1860; Renamed Worcester on 19 October 1876
- Reclassified: Training ship, 1876
- Fate: Foundered in River Thames, 30 August 1948; Salvaged for scrap, 1953

General characteristics (as completed)
- Class & type: 86-gun second-rate ship of the line
- Displacement: 4,502 long tons (4,574 t)
- Tons burthen: 3,241 bm
- Length: 214 ft (65.2 m) (gundeck)
- Beam: 60 ft (18.3 m)
- Depth of hold: 23 ft 9 in (7.24 m)
- Installed power: 4 fire-tube boilers; 2,276 ihp (1,697 kW)
- Propulsion: 1 propeller shaft; HRCR steam engine
- Sail plan: full-rigged ship
- Speed: 11.7 knots (21.7 km/h; 13.5 mph) (under steam)
- Complement: 830
- Armament: Lower deck: 30 × 8 in (203 mm) shell guns; Upper deck: 32 × 32 pdr guns; Quarterdeck/Forecastle: 22 × 32pdr guns; 2 × 68 pdr guns

HMS Frederick William was an 86-gun screw-propelled second-rate ship of the line built for the Royal Navy during the 1850s. She was originally ordered in 1833 as a 110-gun, first-rate ship of the line under the name of Royal Sovereign, but was renamed Royal Frederick in 1839. Construction did not begin until 1841 and proceeded very, very slowly and was often suspended entirely. Still under construction, the ship was ordered to be razeed and converted into a steam-powered, two-deck ship of the line in 1857. Royal Frederick was renamed Frederick William in 1860 and completed that same year.

The ship was immediately placed in ordinary and was not commissioned until 1864 when she began her service as a guard ship. That lasted until 1868 when she was again placed in ordinary. Frederick William was renamed Worcester in 1876 and became a training ship for merchant seamen until she was sold for scrap in 1948. The ship foundered shortly after the sale and was not salvaged until 1953.

== Background and description ==
Designed by Captain Sir William Symonds, Surveyor of the Navy, the ship was initially ordered from HM Dockyard, Portsmouth on 12 September 1833 as a 110-gun Queen-class ship of the line, under the name HMS Royal Sovereign. The order was suspended on 7 May 1834, but was later renewed, this time under the name HMS Royal Frederick, a change in name which took place on 12 April 1839. She was laid down on 1 July 1841, but work was slow, and on 29 June 1848 she was re-ordered to a modification of the Queen-class design, still powered by sails alone.

The Queen-class ships measured 204 feet (62.2 m) at the gun deck and 166 feet 5 inches (50.7 m) on the keel. They had a beam of 60 feet (18.3 m), a depth of hold of 23 feet 9 inches (7.2 m) and had a tonnage of 3,09990/94 tons burthen. Their crew numbered 950 officers and ratings. The ships had the usual three-masted full-ship rig.

The ship was intended to be armed with 110 muzzle-loading, smoothbore guns that consisted of thirty 32-pounder (55 cwt) (Note: "Cwt" is the abbreviation for hundredweight, 55 cwt referring to the weight of the gun.) guns and two 60 cwt 8 in (203 mm) shell guns on her lower gun deck, thirty 32-pounder (55 cwt) gun and a pair of 60 cwt 8-inch shell guns on her middle gun deck and thirty-two 49 cwt 32-pounder guns on her upper gun deck. Her forecastle carried a pair of short 40 cwt 32-pounders and two 68-pounder (36 cwt) carronades. On her quarterdeck she mounted ten short 32-pounder guns. Above the quarterdeck was her poop deck with four 18-pounder (10 cwt) carronades.

=== Conversion into a steam-powered ship of the line ===
Based on the experiences gained during the Crimean War, Sir Baldwin Wake Walker, Surveyor of the Navy, favored converting first- and second-rate ships as they could accommodate the engines and their required coal better than smaller ships. The order for the still unfinished ship was again modified on 28 February 1857 when Walker ordered that she be converted into an 86-gun screw battleship during an arms race between France and Britain in steam-powered ships of the line. Conversion work began on 28 May 1859, and the ship was renamed Frederick William on 28 January 1860, in honour of Crown Prince Friedrich Wilhelm of Prussia, who had (1858) married Victoria, Princess Royal.

To make room for the engine and boilers, the ship was lengthened by 10 feet (3.0 m). Her hull was cut in half, the rear portion sealed and launched separately. A new midsection was built and the rear section was dragged onto the slipway and reattached. Frederick William measured 214 feet (65.2 m) at the gun deck and 174 feet (53.0 m) at the keel. Her tonnage increased to 3,241 tons burthen and she now displaced 4,502 long tons (4,574 t). The ship's crew now consisted of 830 officers and ratings.

Frederick William was powered by a two-cylinder horizontal horizontal-return, connecting rod-steam engine built by Maudslay, Sons and Field that was rated at 500 nominal horsepower. The engine used steam provided by four fire-tube boilers. During the ship's sea trials in Stokes Bay on 29 November 1860, she reached a speed of 11.8 knots (21.9 km/h; 13.6 mph) from 2,276 indicated horsepower (1,697 kW), without rigging.

The lower gun deck armament of Frederick William consisted of thirty 8-inch (65 cwt) shell guns. The upper gun deck had thirty-two 32-pounders (56 cwt) and the combined armament of the forecastle and quarterdeck totalled twenty-two 32-pounders (42 cwt) and two 68-pounder (95 cwt) pivot guns.

== Service history ==
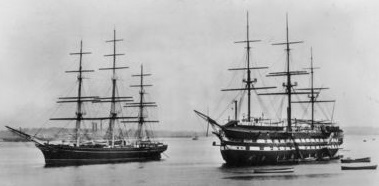
Cutty Sark (left) and Worcester as training ships

Frederick William, the only ship of her name to serve in the RN as of 2020, was launched on 24 March 1864, completed about June and placed in ordinary. The ship was commissioned by Captain Edward Codd on 1 July to serve as a guard ship at Portland, replacing Colossus. Captain Edmund Heathcote relieved him on 7 March 1865 and she was stationed at Queenstown (modern Cobh), Ireland, by that time. Heathcote was relieved by Captain John James Kennedy on 31 January 1866 and the ship was paid off on 31 August 1868.

On 19 October 1876 she was renamed as Worcester, to take on a new role as a training ship at Greenhithe for the merchant seamen attending the Thames Nautical Training College. She fulfilled this role until her sale in July 1948 to Frary Brothers. She foundered in the River Thames on 30 August, but was raised in May 1953 and was broken up by Tennant & Horne.

== Bibliography ==
- Colledge, J. J.; Warlow, Ben & Bush, Steve (2020). Ships of the Royal Navy: The Complete Record of all Fighting Ships of the Royal Navy from the 15th Century to the Present (5th revised and updated ed.). Seaforth Publishing. ISBN 978-1-5267-9327-0.
- Lambert, Andrew D. (1984). Battleships in Transition: The Creation of the Steam Battlefleet 1815-1860. Conway Maritime Press. ISBN 0-85177-315-X.
- Lyon, David & Winfield, Rif (2004). The Sail and Steam Navy List: All the Ships of the Royal Navy 1815–1889. Chatham Publishing. ISBN 978-1-86176-032-6. OCLC 52620555.
- Winfield, Rif (2014). British Warships in the Age of Sail, 1817–1863: Design, Construction, Careers and Fates. Seaforth Publishing. ISBN 978-1-84832-169-4.
- Winfield, Rif (2010). First Rate: The Greatest Warships of the Age of Sail. Naval Institute Press. ISBN 978-1-59114-264-5.
