= Ebbsfleet International railway station =

Railway station in Kent, England

Coordinates: 51°26′34.94″N 0°19′15.18″E

Ebbsfleet International
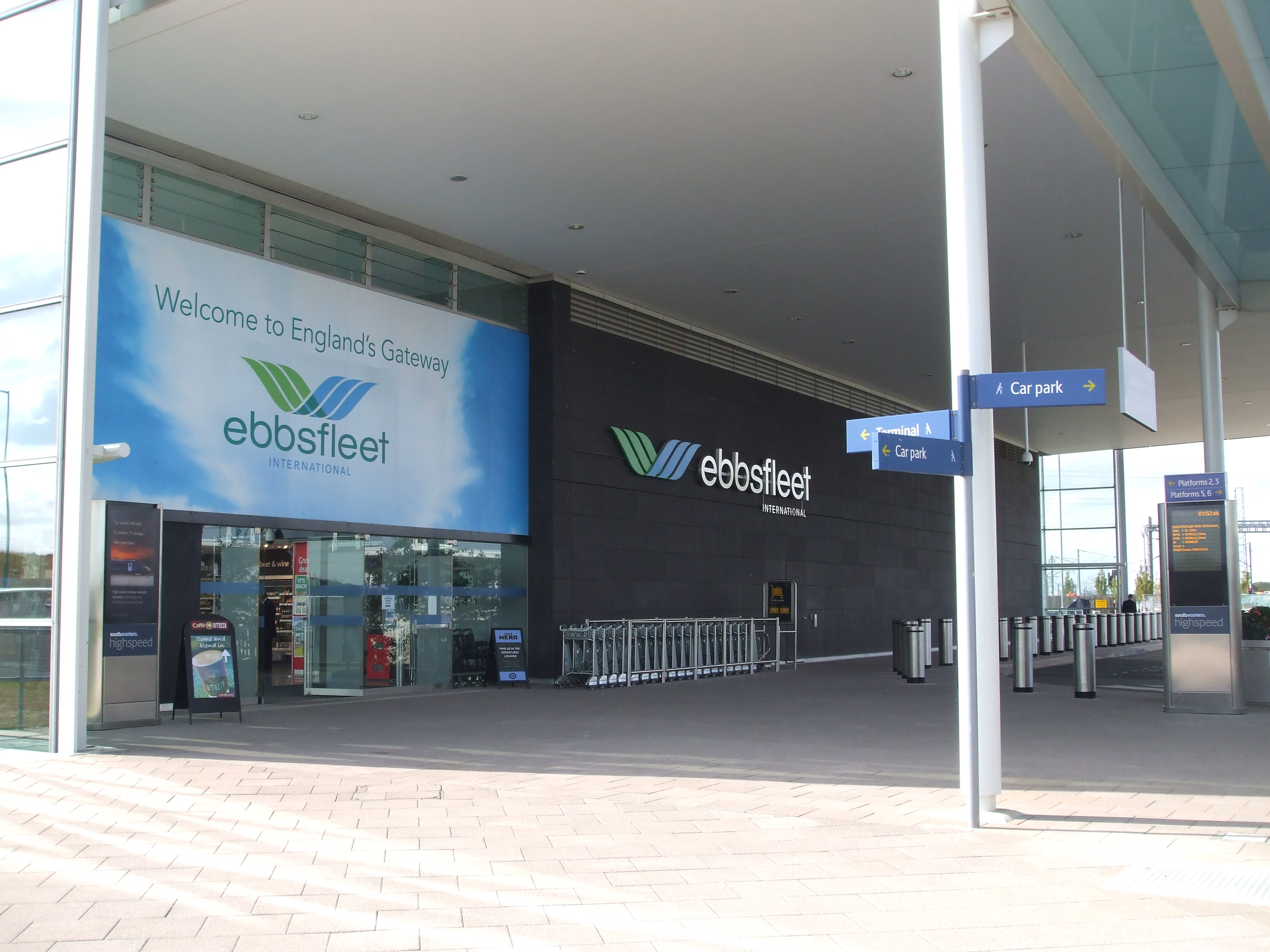

General information
- Location: Ebbsfleet Valley, Kent, Borough of Dartford; England
- Grid reference: TQ613741
- Owner: London and Continental Railways
- Manager: Network Rail
- Platforms: 6 (4 domestic, 2 international)

Other information
- Station code: EBD
- IATA code: XQE
- Classification: DfT category B

History
- Opened: 19 November 2007; 18 years ago

Passengers
- 2020/21: ▼0.417 million
- Interchange: ▼19,330
- 2021/22: ▲1.213 million
- Interchange: ▲44,469
- 2022/23: ▲1.559 million
- Interchange: ▲82,975
- 2023/24: ▲1.715 million
- Interchange: ▼79,598
- 2024/25: ▲1.765 million
- Interchange: ▲87,338
Location
Notes
- Passenger statistics from the Office of Rail and Road

Ebbsfleet International railway station is in Ebbsfleet Valley, Kent, 10 miles (16 kilometres) east of London, England, near Dartford and the Bluewater Shopping Centre to the west and Gravesend to the east. The station, part of the Thames Gateway urban regeneration project, is on the High Speed 1 (HS1) rail line, 300 metres (980 feet) south-west of Northfleet railway station, off the A2 trunk road, 5 mi (8.0 km) from its junction with the M25 motorway. It served as a primary park-and-rail service for the London 2012 Olympics.

Ebbsfleet International is owned by HS1 Ltd, which operates the High Speed 1 railway and St Pancras railway station, Stratford International, Ebbsfleet International and Ashford International.

== Name ==
The name Ebbsfleet dates from the seventeenth-century. The station is partly inspired by the name of Ebbsfleet in Thanet, 47 mi (75 km) to the east.

== History ==
As part of the development of the Channel Tunnel Rail Link (CTRL) in the early 1990s, four potential station sites along the route were considered, with two in east London (Stratford and Rainham) and two in Kent (Nashenden on the outskirts of Rochester, and Ebbsfleet located southwest of Gravesend). By August 1994, Ebbsfleet had been chosen over Nashenden, given its less remote location. The station would serve both international and domestic trains, allow park and ride from nearby M2 and M25 motorways and stimulate development in the Thames Gateway. The station was approved as part of the Channel Tunnel Rail Link Act 1996.

Similar in design to Stratford International, the station was designed by architect Mark Fisher, working under Alastair Lansley – the chief architect on the Channel Tunnel Rail Link project. Fisher described the station as "a big, generous light-filled bridge of steel and glass crossing the tracks and spanning the box". Internal finishings of the station were designed by Jestico + Whiles.

Construction began on Phase 2 of the CTRL project in 2002. Construction was completed by September 2006.

=== Opening ===
The £180m station opened to Eurostar passengers on 19 November 2007, five days after the rest of HS1. This was because the security and ticketing equipment had to be transferred from Waterloo International and reinstalled at the station. The first daily service was the 05:38 service to Paris, arriving at its destination 132 minutes later. Serving the Thames Gateway, the station had an initial service of seven weekday trains to Paris and five to Brussels. A 2,500-space car park was provided.

A formal opening ceremony in the presence of Dame Kelly Holmes took place on 29 January 2008.

Residents of Ashford complained that the service at Ashford International was downgraded to compensate for the stop at Ebbsfleet and that it made more sense for them now to use Eurotunnel Shuttle services.

=== Naming ===
"Ebbsfleet International Station" was the name originally proposed for the station, but "Dartford International Station" was later proposed at the urging of Eurostar, who felt that Dartford was a name with greater national recognition. Opposition to Eurostar's ‘Dartford International’ proposal came from Gravesham Borough Council, whose administrative centre at Gravesend is just two miles (3.2 km) away (even though Ebbsfleet International is in the borough of Dartford and therefore outside Gravesham council's authority); Southfleet Parish Council; and Swanscombe and Greenhithe Town Council, both in the Borough of Dartford. The similarity of its name to that of Dartford railway station, 6 mi (9.7 km) away, was also of concern.

=== Javelin ===
The Olympic Javelin or Javelin was a high-speed train shuttle service operated by Southeastern over High Speed 1 during the 2012 Summer Olympics and Paralympics. The service ran for the duration of both games, between St Pancras International station and this station, via Stratford International station, which is close to the Olympic Park. During the Summer Olympics a service of eight trains an hour ran between St Pancras and Ebbsfleet, calling at Stratford, replacing the usual East Kent highspeed service. Two of these were extended to Ashford and one to Faversham. Between 11pm and 1am the service between St Pancras and Ebbsfleet was increased to twelve per hour.

=== Eurostar suspension ===
In September 2020, Eurostar announced that due to the ongoing COVID-19 pandemic and subsequent collapse in ticket revenue (down by 90%), both Ebbsfleet and Ashford International stations would not be served by Eurostar services until at least 2022. In September 2021, Eurostar confirmed that services would not resume until 2023, despite complaints by local politicians that this was "bad for Kent". Eurostar stated that it would resume services when commercially sensible to do so, as it would initially "focus on destinations where demand is highest". A further update in August 2022 confirmed that Eurostar might not resume serving the station (along with Ashford) until at least 2025. To date, Eurostar services have not been restored at Ebbsfleet or Ashford.

== Layout ==
On High Speed 1 there are avoiding lines in each direction and four platforms, two serving international Eurostar services and two the Southeastern High-speed services. Southeastern services travelling between London and the North Kent Line use a junction to the north of the station and are served by another pair of platforms that curve away to the east.

Ticket barriers control access to all platforms.

A partially built and disused concrete overbridge can be seen to the south of the station. This is believed to have been put in place in preparation for the Ebbsfleet Garden City housing development project; however, it was never needed.

== Access and facilities ==
This station has bilingual signage, both in French and English. It is one of the relatively few stations in England to have bilingual signage, others being Wallsend (Latin), Southall (Punjabi), Hereford (Welsh), Whitechapel (Bengali), St Pancras and Ashford International (French).

=== Parking ===
The Channel Tunnel Rail Link (CTRL) Act allows a total of 9,000 car parking spaces to be constructed, with an initial 6,000 built. The car parks are in a number of areas around the station - north of the North Kent Line, between the North Kent Line and High Speed 1, south of the High Speed 1 and south west of the station building.

=== Buses and coaches ===
The station is served by Fastrack buses operated by Go-Ahead London, which connect it to Dartford, Bluewater Shopping Centre, Greenhithe, Swanscombe and Gravesend. It is also served by Arriva Kent Thameside routes 483 and 481 (school days only). GoBus also serves Ebbsfleet International station with route CB1 and the Go2 Ebbsfleet Valley demand-responsive transport service. Despite being in close proximity to the station, Northfleet has no bus connection to the station.

=== Taxis ===
There is a taxi rank directly outside the station entrance/exit. Car rental services for both leisure and business are located in the concourse. The interchange facilities lie at either end of the main station box - taxis, buses and set down at the northern end (to also serve the NKL platforms) and coaches to the south of the station box. It was formerly planned that Crossrail would terminate at a separate station between Northfleet and Ebbsfleet International but under the current plan, Abbey Wood further west will be the eastern terminus. However, a Crossrail extension from Abbey Wood to Gravesend (Hoo Junction) remains safeguarded.

=== Pedestrian access ===
Northfleet railway station is approximately 400 metres (1,300 ft) to the north-east, although the walking distance between the two stations is significantly longer, approximately 2 km (1.2 mi) if roadside footpaths are followed. There is a shorter walking route (approximately 1,000 metres (3,300 ft)) through the car park to the north of Ebbsfleet station, but there are no footpaths provided and this way is obstructed by the car park access barriers. There are no specific pedestrian or cycle route signs for Ebbsfleet station on any of the possible routes between the stations. Gravesham Council acknowledges that the existing provision is inadequate, although it is a complex planning issue to resolve as whilst Northfleet is in Gravesham, Ebbsfleet station is just over the border in the Borough of Dartford, and there are many other stakeholders involved.

== Services ==
=== Domestic services ===
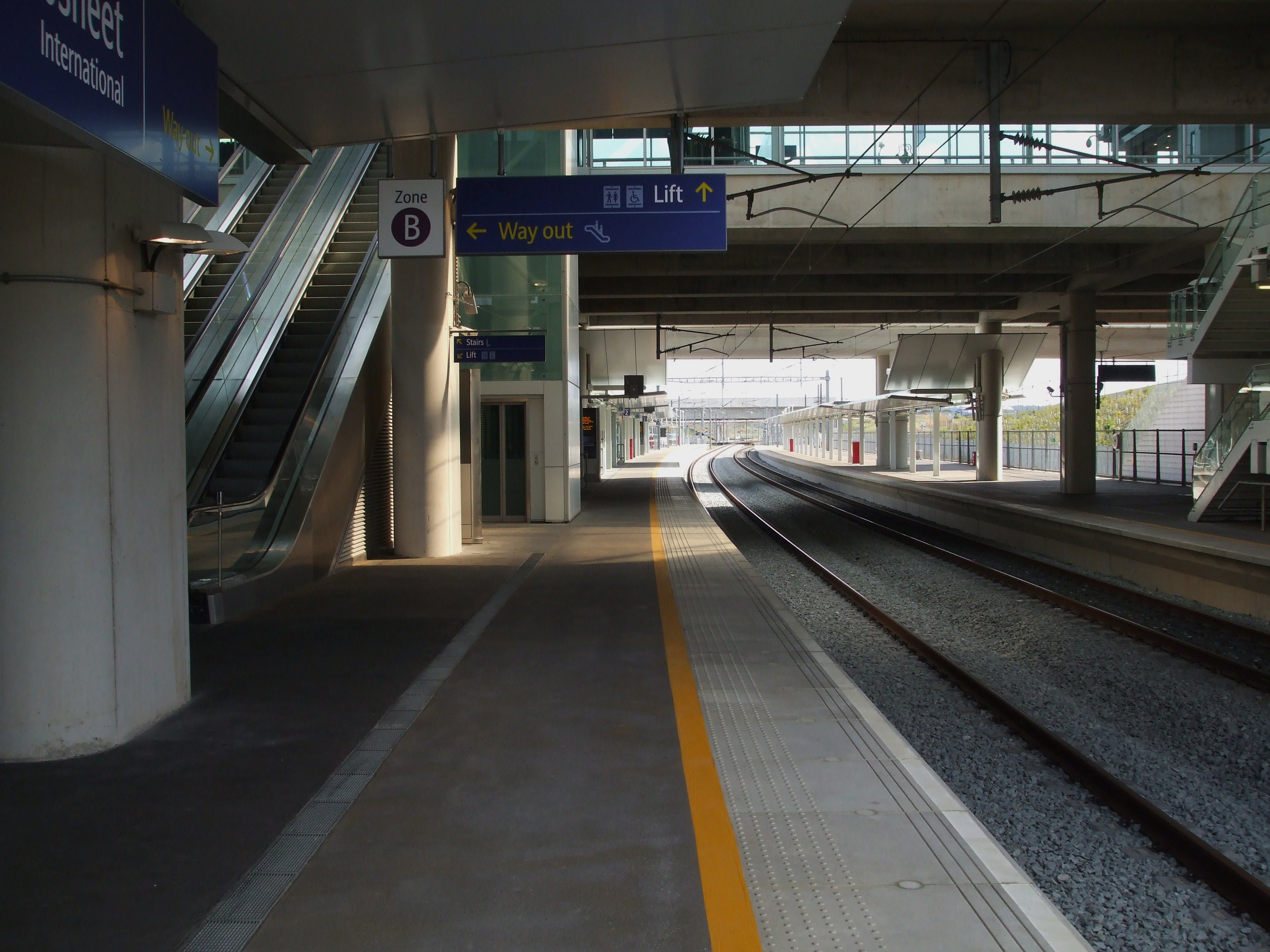
International platform 1

==== Service history ====
On 29 June 2009, Southeastern started a weekday preview service between St Pancras International and Ebbsfleet International, extending to Ashford International during peak hours. On 7 September the service was enhanced by a few services to Ramsgate via Canterbury West or Dover. A regular service began on 13 December 2009.

The typical off-peak service in trains per hour was:

- 4 tph to London St Pancras International
- 2 tph to Faversham
- 1 tph to Margate via Canterbury West
- 1 tph to Dover Priory

Additional trains, in peak hours only, serve Maidstone West, Broadstairs via the Medway towns, and Sandwich.

==== Current services ====
All domestic services at Ebbsfleet International are operated by Southeastern using Class 395 EMUs.

The typical off-peak service in trains per hour is:

- 4 tph to London St Pancras International
- 2 tph to Faversham via Gravesend of which 1 continues to Ramsgate
- 1 tph to Ramsgate via Dover Priory
- 1 tph to Margate via Canterbury West

Additional services, including two daily return services between London St Pancras International and Maidstone West call at the station during the peak hours.

=== International services ===
After the opening of Ebbsfleet station in 2007, Eurostar transferred a number of trips from Ashford to the newer station. Ashford International had a wider variety of destinations such as Calais, Lille, Brussels, Disneyland Paris, the French Alps, Paris, Lyon, Avignon and Marseille, but with fewer services to them. In contrast, Ebbsfleet International had services to only the core destinations (Paris, Brussels and Lille) and the Disneyland Paris service, but with much more frequent services.

Eurostar services are not used for non-international journeys, as the infrastructure and train design is not suitable for national travel, and there is no feasible reason to do so. Since the station's opening, Eurostar has withheld passenger usage statistics for international services, citing commercial confidentiality.

In May 2019, the typical Eurostar services were:

- 6 trains per day to Paris Gare du Nord
- 6 trains per day to Brussels-South, via Lille Europe (some via Ashford International)
- 4 trains per week to Marne-la-Vallée–Chessy (Disneyland Paris) via Ashford International and Lille Europe.

Eurostar services have been suspended since 31 March 2020. In August 2022, Eurostar stated that they intended to resume service in 2025 at the earliest. As of August 2026, there is no indication when or if Eurostar will resume services to Ebbsfleet or Ashford International stations.

Preceding station	National Rail	Following station
Stratford International	Southeastern High Speed 1	Gravesend
Stratford International	Southeastern High Speed 1	Ashford International
	Eurostar	
London St Pancras International	Eurostar (Suspended)	Ashford International
London St Pancras International	Eurostar (Suspended)	Calais-Frethun or Lille Europe
London St Pancras International	Eurostar (Suspended)	Paris Nord

== Gallery ==
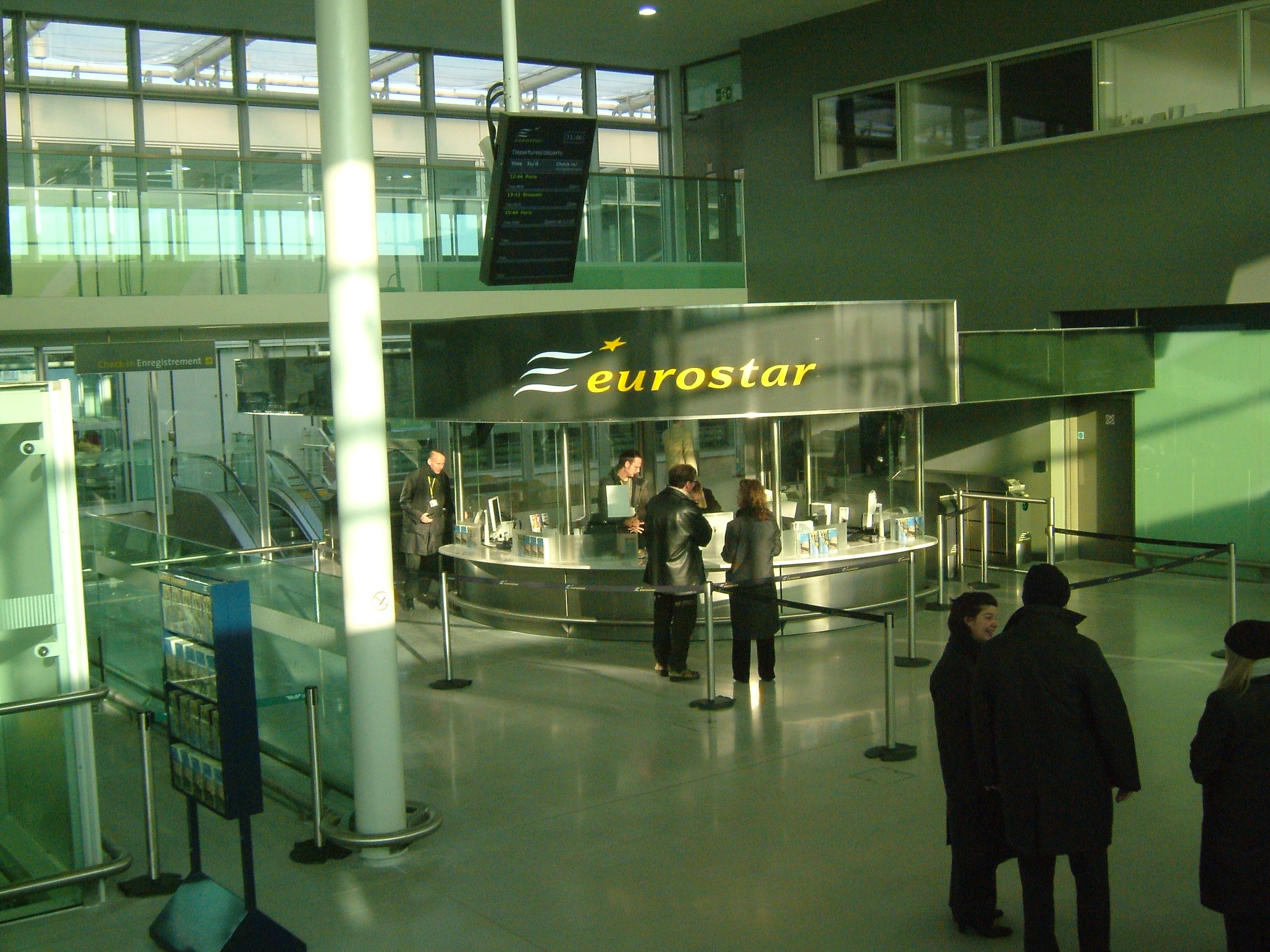
Departures

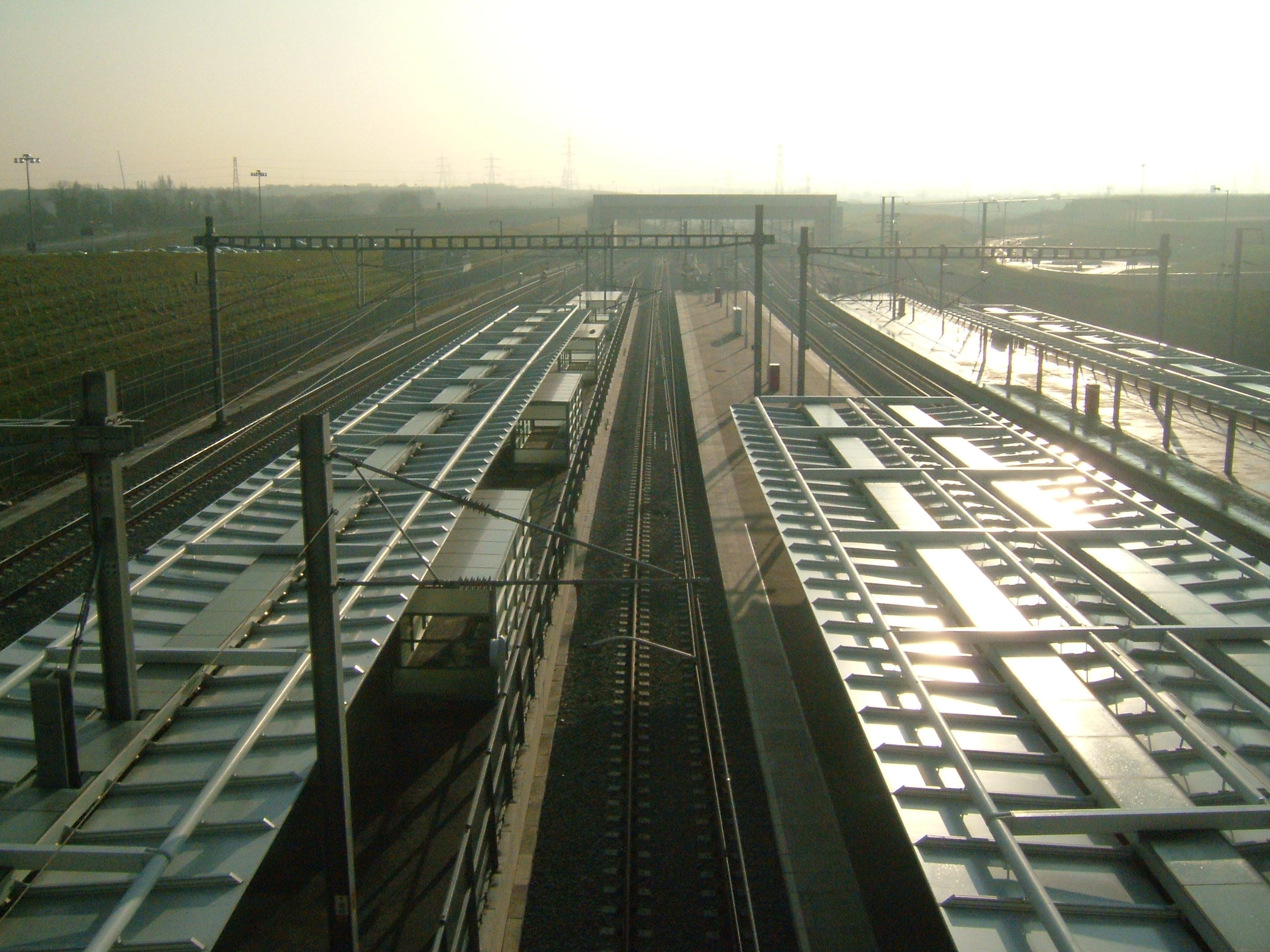
The track towards the Medway Viaduct.

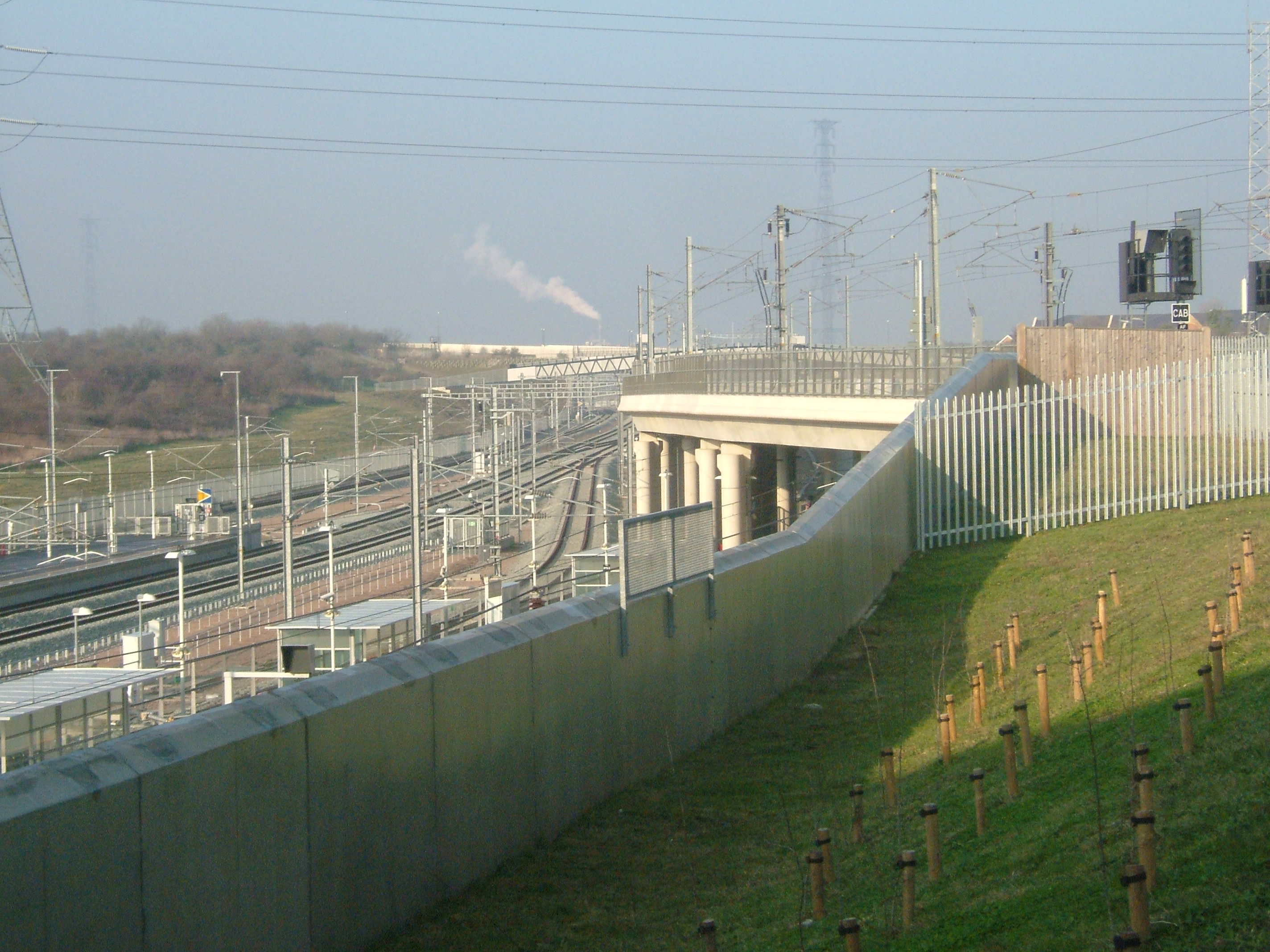
Details of the track, looking west, showing descending link from the North Kent Line.

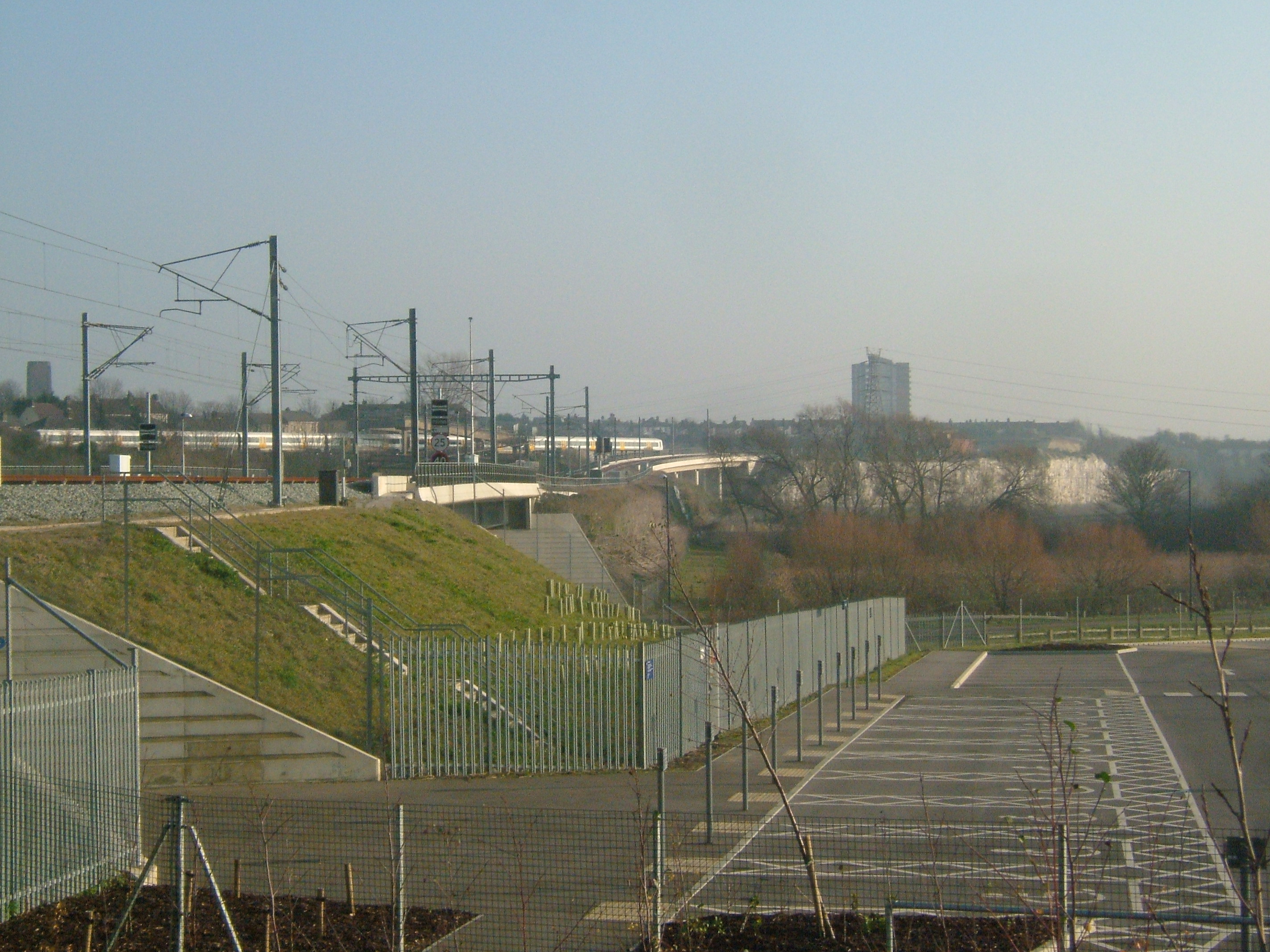
Showing the North Kent link line with a 12 car unit on the North Kent Line approaching the junction.
