= Greenhithe, Kent =

Village in the Borough of Dartford, Kent, England

Coordinates: 51.4504°N 0.2823°E

Greenhithe
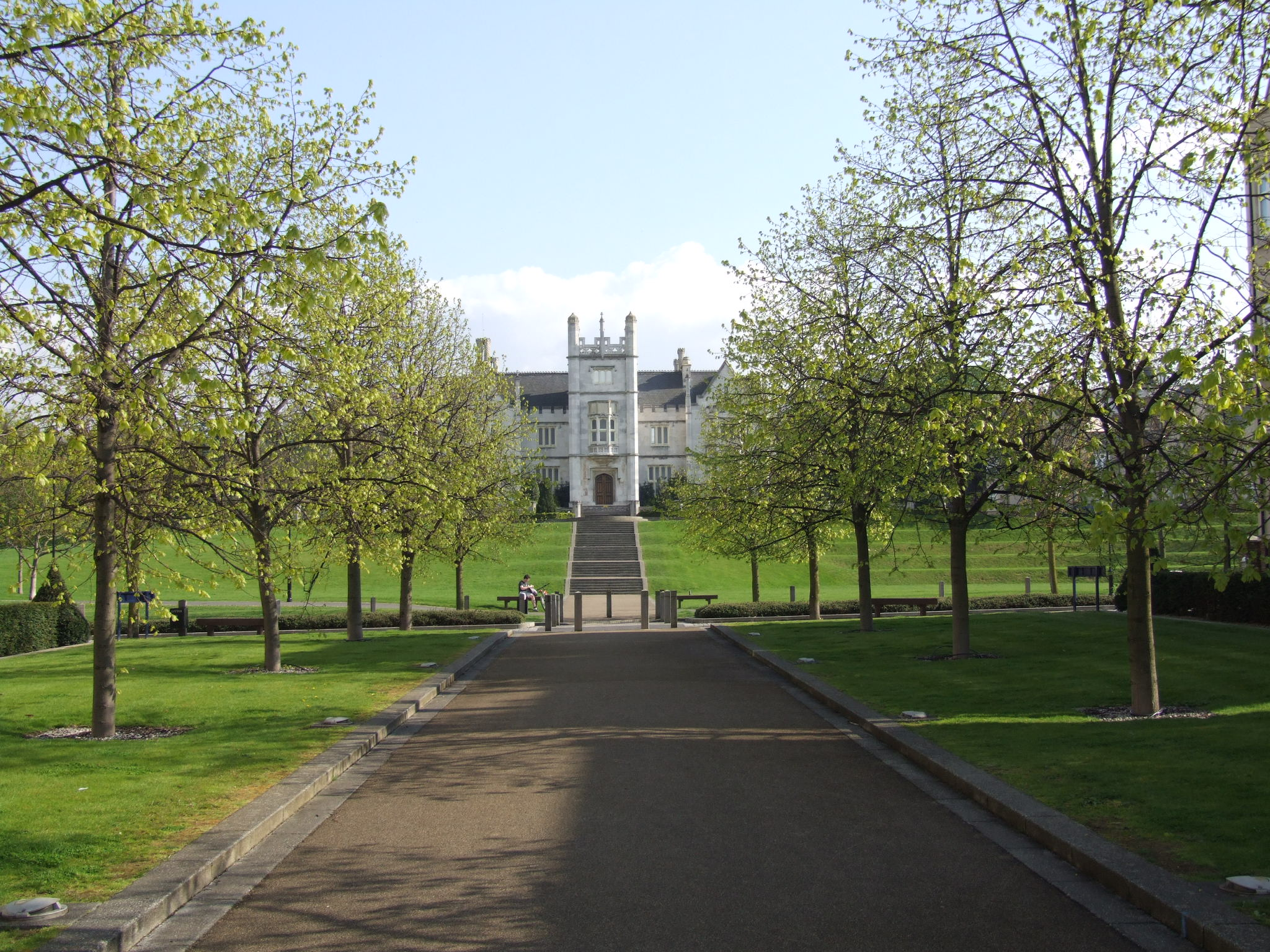
- Ingress Abbey in Greenhithe

- Location within Kent
- Population: 6,567 (2011)
- OS grid reference: TQ586748
- Civil parish: Swanscombe and Greenhithe
- District: Dartford
- Shire county: Kent
- Region: South East
- Country: England
- Sovereign state: United Kingdom
- Post town: Greenhithe
- Postcode district: DA9
- Dialling code: 01322
- Police: Kent
- Fire: Kent
- Ambulance: South East Coast
- UK Parliament: Dartford

Greenhithe is a village in the Borough of Dartford in Kent, England, and the civil parish of Swanscombe and Greenhithe. It is located 4 miles (6.5 kilometres) east of Dartford and 5 miles (8 kilometres) west of Gravesend.

== Area ==
In the past, Greenhithe's waterfront on the estuary of the River Thames was used to build wharves for transshipping corn, wood and other commodities; its largest cargoes were of chalk and lime. This led in turn to the development of the cement industry at nearby Swanscombe. Greenhithe itself enjoyed a brief period of popularity during Victorian times as a tourist resort, with the building of Greenhithe Pier (now lost) in 1842. On 11 August 1863, Queen Victoria boarded the Royal Yacht Victoria and Albert - moored off Greenhithe - "amid the eager applause of a large crowd of young and old".

Its manor house has been fully restored and the village is accessible to the M25 motorway, High Speed 1's Ebbsfleet International station and, particularly relevant to its local economy, Bluewater shopping centre.

== History ==
The social history of Greenhithe is bound up in terms of its rectory revenues and manors until the 20th century with its ecclesiastical parish, which is Swanscombe. It owes a great deal to its situation by the Thames and expansion to the nearby Watling Street (the London-Dover Road) and it being a suitable landing place for ships. In Roman times known as Gretenrsce, and by 1363 Grenehuth, 'Greenhithe' comes from The Old English 'hythe' meaning 'landing-place', with ‘grene’ as ‘green’; therefore, a ‘green landing place’.

It appears in a History and Topographical Survey of the County of Kent by Edward Hasted, compiled early as such major works date, in this case to 1778:

Here there are several wharves for the landing and shipping of corn, wood, and other commodities, but the greatest traffic arises from the chalk and lime, from the chalk pits, the range of which continues with small intermission from Stone to Gravesend, within a very short distance of the shore. Hence not only the City of London, but the adjacent counties, and even those of Suffolk and Norfolk are supplied with this commodity".

Greenhithe railway station opened on the South Eastern Railway’s North Kent Line, on 30 July 1849.

=== Naval training and ship maintenance ===
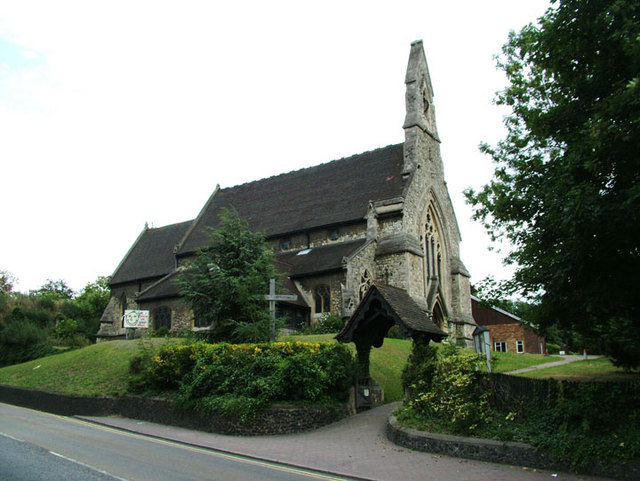
St Mary's Church

In the middle of the 19th century, the need was recognised for pre-sea training for potential officers in the Royal and Merchant Navies. This led a group of London shipowners to found the Thames Nautical Training College in 1862. The Admiralty was approached for a ship and allocated the "two-decker" HMS Worcester. At the time the Royal Navy was starting to replace its fleet of 'wooden walls' with iron-clad vessels and there was a surplus of such wooden vessels, which included the 1473-ton, 50-gun Worcester. She had various berths before finally moving in 1871 to what became a base forever associated with the Worcester – the village of Greenhithe, where successive ships remained until the 1970s. Also, HMS Erebus and HMS Terror departed from Greenhithe in May 1845, on the Franklin expedition.

The clipper Cutty Sark was given to the college in 1938, and was used as a 'boating station' moored off the Greenhithe estate. However, during the war years, the college was evacuated to nearby Foots Cray Place. The Worcester was used as a training base by the Royal Navy but by 1945 the second Worcester was in a very poor condition, had lost most of her masts and was only kept afloat by a large salvage pump. Happily, after the war, a replacement ship was found in the form of the Exmouth, which was renamed and became the third and last Worcester. She was an unusual vessel, since she was built in 1904 of steel and iron especially for nautical training and had many advantages over the converted hulks previously used.

As a result of the acquisition of the fine new ship, the role of the Cutty Sark diminished and, with the approval of the original donor, Mrs Dowman, she was given to the nation through the National Maritime Museum. After restoration, she was moved to a permanent dry-dock at Greenwich.

The college moved to a new shore based Merchant Navy College and the last Worcester was broken up a few years later. The village of Greenhithe has many Worcester memories such as the sign at the waterside pub, and the streets named after Worcester personalities.

The new college allowed for expanded facilities and the new main building incorporated a replica of a modern ship's bridge overlooking the River Thames.

== Ingress Abbey ==
The Ingress Estate was a seat (manor) in the hamlet of Greenhithe. In 1363 the manor was endowed upon the Prioress and Abbey of the Dominican Sisters in Dartford by Edward III (1307–1377) until the Dissolution of the Monasteries under King Henry VIII of England.

In 1820, the Ingress Estate was purchased by barrister James Harman. He gave his architect, Charles Moreing, £120,000 to build the Abbey. The current Tudor-gothic-style mansion, Ingress Abbey, was constructed in 1833. Stone from the medieval London Bridge, replaced in the 1830s, is said to have been used in the construction. A grotto within the grounds known as the cave of the seven heads features keystones of grotesque heads which possibly came from the medieval London Bridge, 6 of which are still visible. The grounds were thought to have been landscaped by Capability Brown.

The Cameroon singer Irene Mayor lives in The Abbey.

== Economy ==
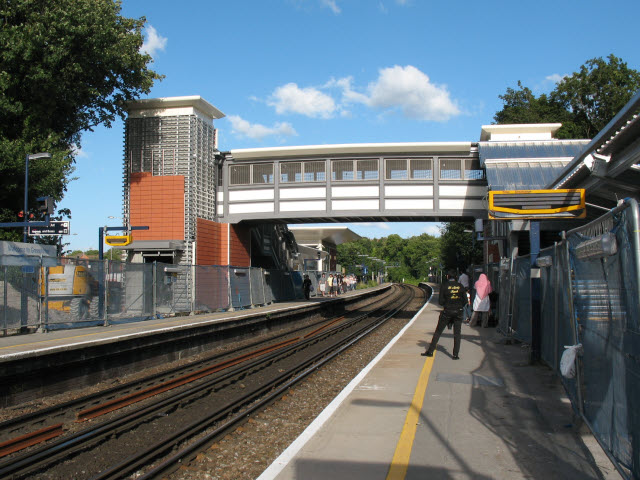
Greenhithe station

Greenhithe's economy no longer depends on river trade, this having been replaced by the M25 motorway, the new High Speed 1 Ebbsfleet International station and the Bluewater complex. The whole area is being redeveloped as part of the Thames Gateway regeneration. Its proponent councils and government sponsors thus aim to attract more affluence and income generation, particularly through the interaction with the enormous shopping complex. This is reflected in increased property valuations, and slightly higher spending than in 20th century overspill estates which tended to line the estuary.

Its high street is less significant a destination than Bluewater, which is supplemented by a supermarket in the village. Greenhithe railway station aside, there is little in the area apart from housing. The Thames Gateway project has seen expansion of residential neighbourhoods of the village such as Ingress Park and Waterstone Park, as well as of industrial and business estates that almost completely surround the former large hamlet.

== Paper mill ==
In 1904, plans emerged outlining the construction of a paper mill complex on a twenty-four acre site the east of Ingress Abbey. Designed by American architect and construction engineer Joseph H. Wallace the mill commenced operation in 1908 as ‘’Ingress Abbey Paper Mills’’. It was a part of ‘’Wall Paper Manufacturers Limited’’ and was the world’s most advanced paper mill. Furthermore, it was also the first mill of its type to be fitted with Crittall iron window frames.

Ingress Abbey Mill made numerous grades of paper from raw materials ranging from grasses of Northern Africa to old rags converted to pulp to make the final product. In 1922 the mill was taken over by Associated Newspapers Limited and was renamed Empire Paper Mills and producing up to 900 tons of newsprint a week.

The mill closed in 1992 before the site was completely redeveloped

== Transport ==
=== Rail ===
Greenhithe station connects the village with National Rail services to Luton via Woolwich Arsenal and London St Pancras, London Victoria via Bexleyheath, London Charing Cross via Sidcup, Gravesend and Rainham.

=== Buses ===
Greenhithe is served by London Buses route 492, Go-Ahead London routes A, B & AZ, Arriva Kent Thameside 480 & 483 and Ensignbus route X80. These connect it with Bexleyheath, Bluewater, Crayford, Dartford, Ebbsfleet, Gravesend, Lakeside, Northfleet and Sidcup.

== Nearby areas ==
- Stone
- Swanscombe
- Bean
- Northfleet
- Dartford
- Darenth
- Southfleet
- Longfield
- South Darenth
- Gravesend
- Sutton at Hone
- Wilmington
- Hartley
- Crayford
- Horton Kirby
