= Arriva Kent Thameside =

Bus operator in Kent, England

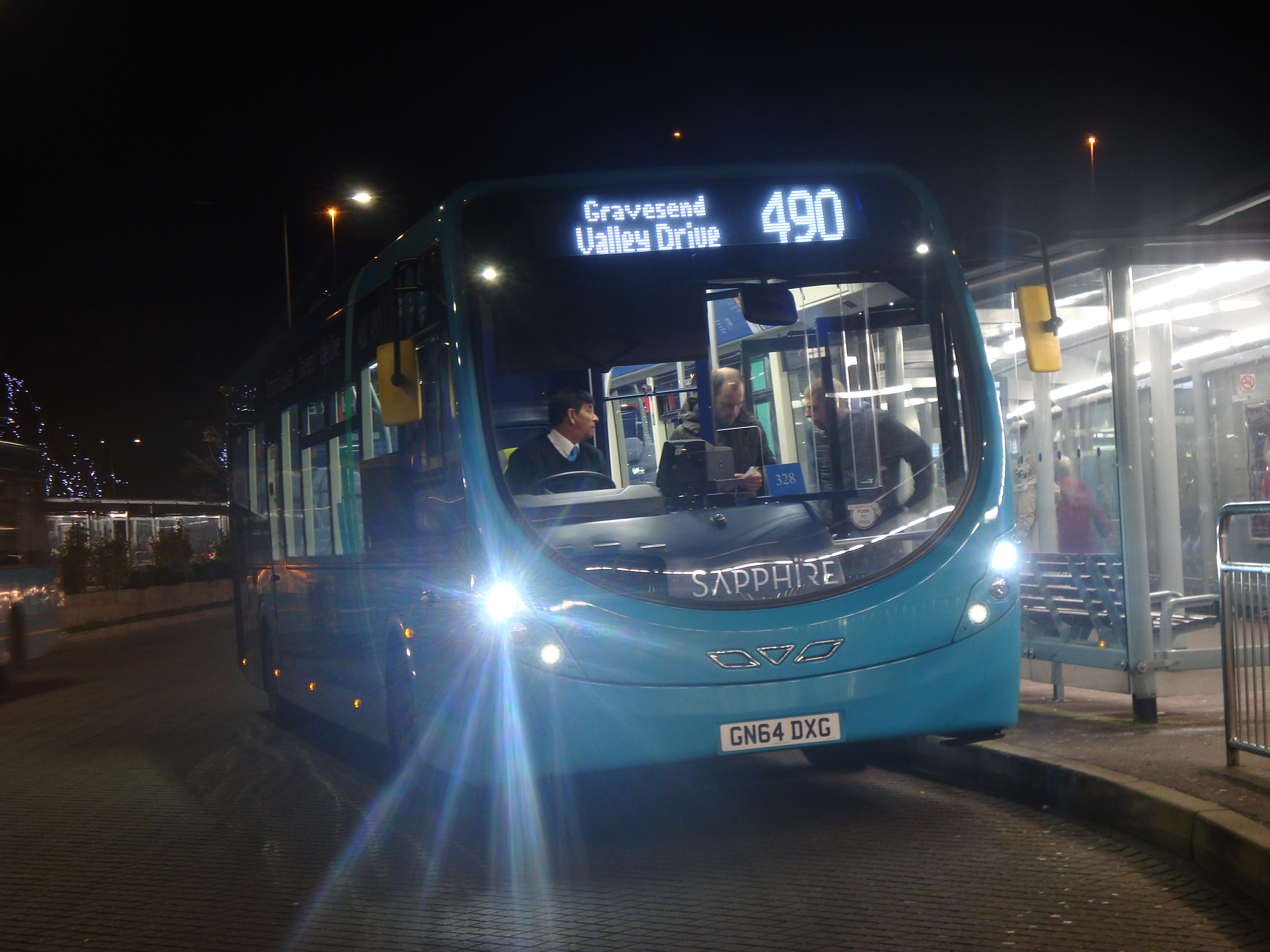
- Wright StreetLite at Bluewater bus station in December 2014
- Parent: Arriva Southern Counties
- Headquarters: Northfleet
- Service area: Kent
- Service type: Bus services
- Routes: 9
- Destinations: 7
- Depots: 1
- Fleet: 36

Arriva Kent Thameside Limited, trading as Arriva Kent Thameside, formerly known as London Transport, London Country and Kentish Bus, is a bus operator based in north-west Kent, England. It is a subsidiary of Arriva UK Bus. The company operates services in Northfleet, Gravesend & Dartford as part of the Arriva Southern Counties division from their Northfleet depot.

== Depot and services ==
Northfleet depot runs a mixture of commercial and tendered services in Dartford, Gravesend and surrounding areas.

Northfleet currently operate the following bus services:

Route	Start	End
190	Gravesend	Chatham
480	Temple Hill	Gravesend
481	Gravesend	Riverview Park
482	Gravesend	Kings Farm
483	Bluewater	Gravesend
483A	Bluewater	Gravesend
490	Gravesend	Valley Drive
491	Gravesend	Riverview Park

=== ArrivaClick ===
Northfleet ran the ArrivaClick demand responsive service which covered Darent Valley Hospital, Bluewater, Greenhithe, Swanscombe and Ebbsfleet Valley using Mercedes-Benz Sprinter vehicles until its withdrawal on 31 December 2024.

== Livery ==
=== Corporate Livery ===
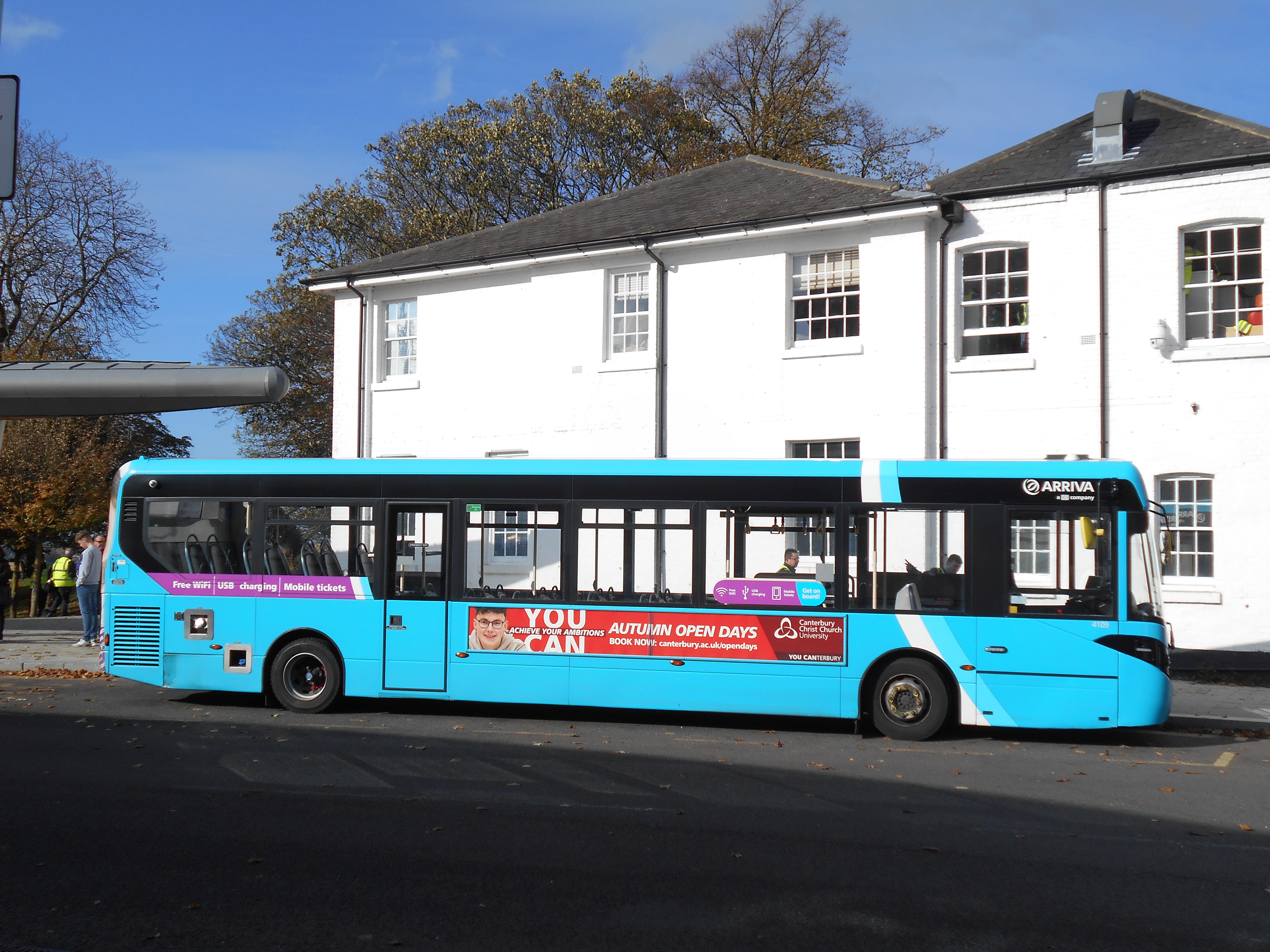
Arriva Medway Towns Alexander Dennis Enviro200 MMC in Chatham, showing the current Arriva corporate livery

The current Arriva corporate livery is light blue across the whole of the vehicle with a pale blue and white stripe at the front of the bus.

This is currently replacing the previous corporate livery which was aquamarine with a cream "cow-horn" at the front with a dark blue skirt. This livery can still be found on many older Arriva Kent Thameside vehicles.

=== Sapphire Livery ===
The current Arriva Sapphire livery uses the same light blue colour across the majority of the bus although the front of the bus is dark blue with a white and silver stripe separating the two colours. Arriva Kent Thameside operate Sapphire liveried buses on routes 480, 490 and 491.

=== Fastrack ===
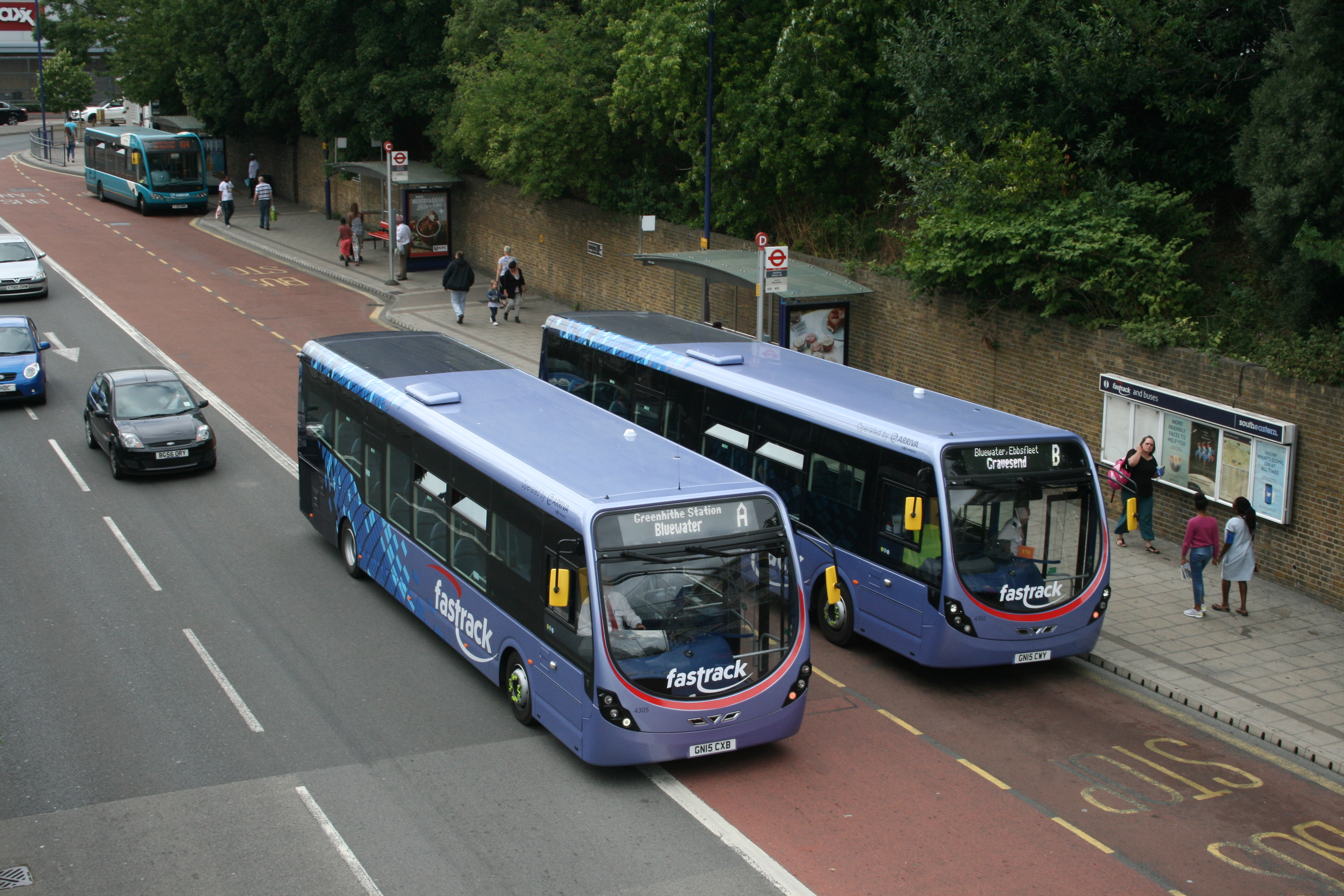
Two Arriva Kent Thameside Wright StreetLites in Fastrack livery in Dartford

As well as the corporate and Sapphire liveries, the buses used on the Fastrack routes A and B had their own specialist livery.

The buses used a purple or grey base livery with a light and dark blue shimmer effect towards the rear with the Fastrack logo on the front, sides and rear of the bus.

The Fastrack services replaced route 100. The buses on this route used the specialist Bluewater livery in March 1999. This was allover blue, with a water shimmer effect. The service using this livery were replaced by Fastrack on 26 March 2006. On 10 November 2024, Go-Ahead London took over the Fastrack routes which will introduce electric buses by April 2025.

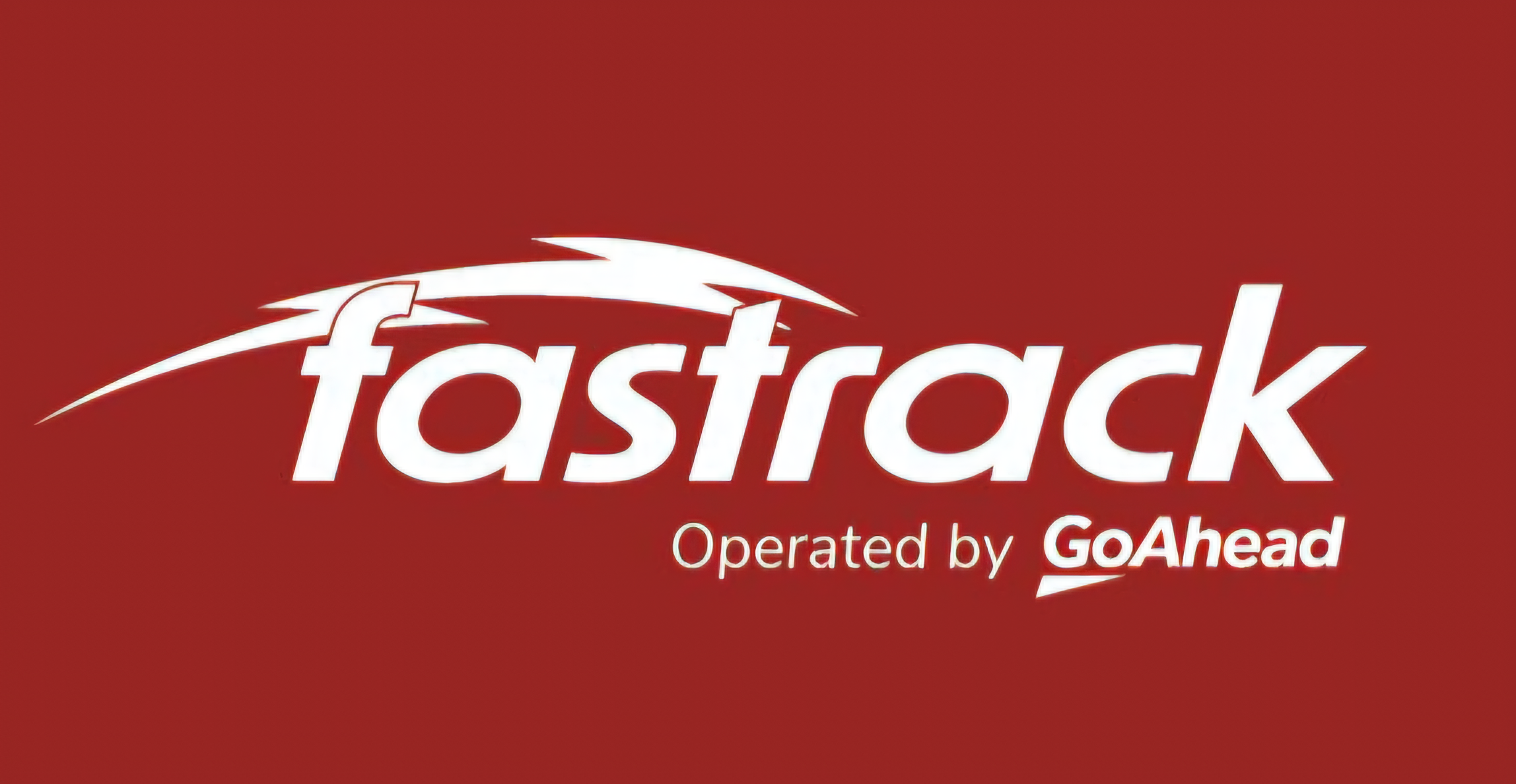
The new Fastrack logo, as of August 2024.

== See also ==
- List of bus operators of the United Kingdom
