= Erith (disambiguation) =

Erith is an area of south-east London.

Erith may also refer to:

== Associated with the London area ==
- Municipal Borough of Erith (1876–1975)
- Erith and Crayford (UK Parliament constituency), 1955–1997
- Erith and Thamesmead (UK Parliament constituency), since 1997
- Erith railway station
- Erith & Belvedere F.C., a football club playing at Park View Road
- Erith Town F.C., a football club playing at Erith Sports Stadium
- Erith Group, a British construction company

== Other meanings ==
- Erith Island, off Tasmania, Australia
- Erith, South Australia
- Raymond Erith (1904–1973), English architect

== See also ==
- Earith, Cambridgeshire, England, a village
- Aerith Gainsborough, a character from the 1997 videogame Final Fantasy VII
