= Greenhithe railway station =

Railway station in Kent, England

Coordinates: 51°27′2.29″N 0°16′44.33″E

Greenhithe for Bluewater
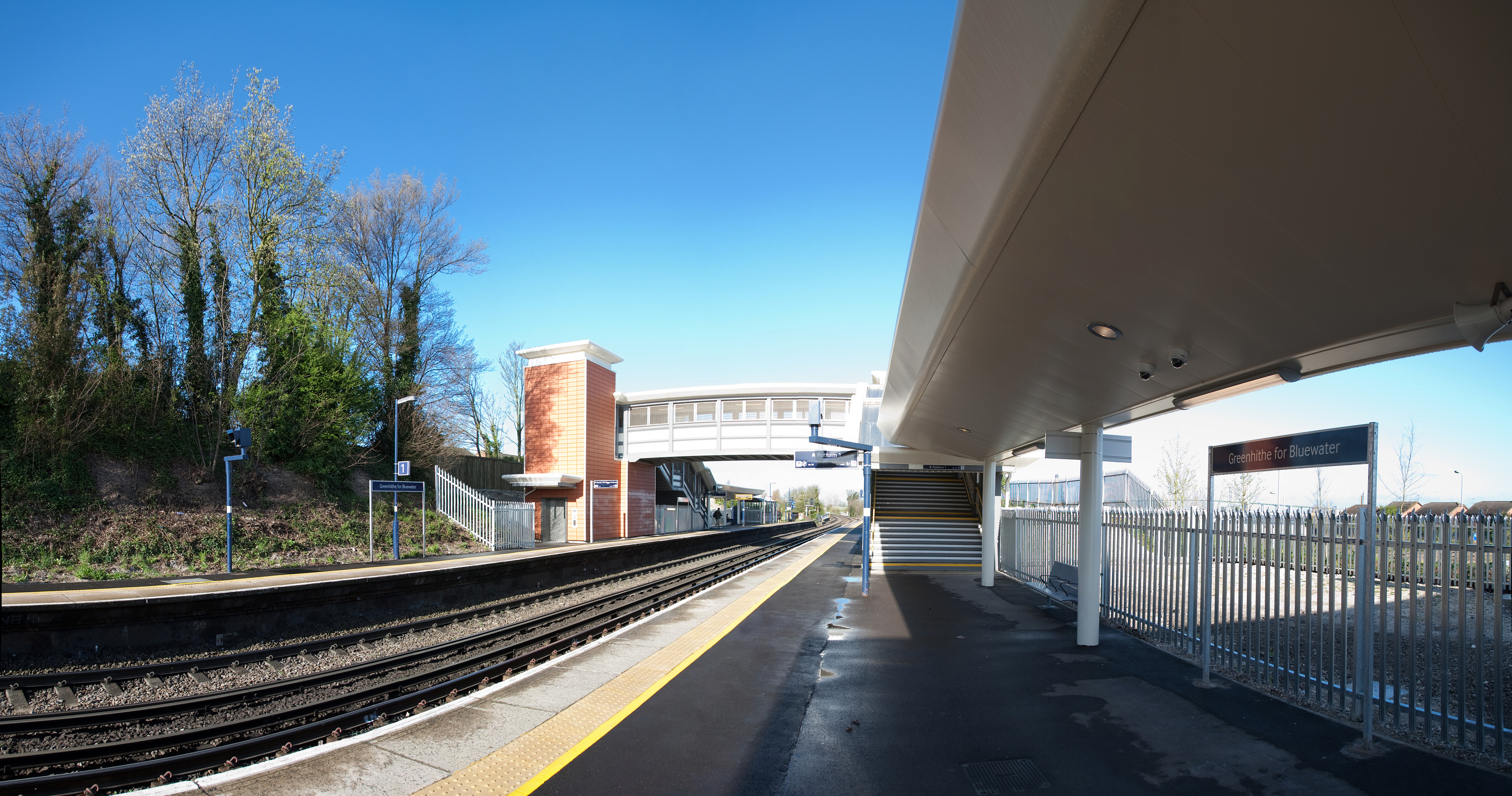

General information
- Location: Greenhithe, Borough of Dartford; England
- Grid reference: TQ584748
- Manager: Southeastern
- Platforms: 2

Other information
- Station code: GNH
- Classification: DfT category E

History
- Opened: 30 July 1849

Passengers
- 2020/21: ▼0.265 million
- 2021/22: ▲0.575 million
- 2022/23: ▲0.689 million
- 2023/24: ▲0.758 million
- 2024/25: ▲0.857 million
Location
Notes
- Passenger statistics from the Office of Rail and Road

Greenhithe railway station (also known as Greenhithe for Bluewater) serves the village of Greenhithe in north Kent and Bluewater Shopping Centre. It is 19 miles 69 chains (32 km) down the line from London Charing Cross. All services are operated by Southeastern and Thameslink.

== Design ==
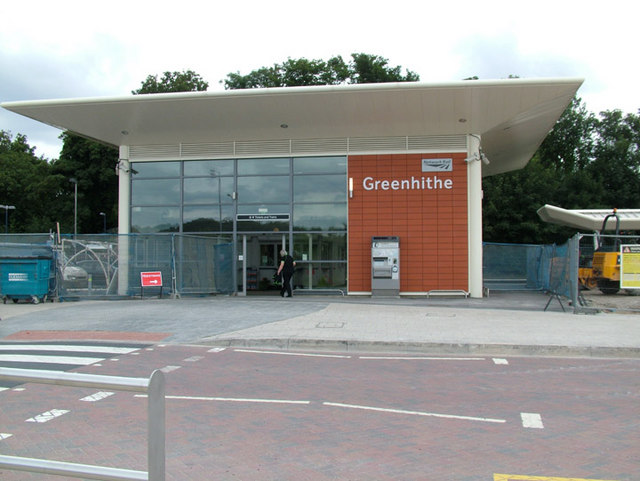
The new Greenhithe Station nearing completion

Before Bluewater was built Greenhithe station was just a small village station. The only access between the entrance and the London-bound platform was via a subway with no disabled access.

The station was rebuilt in 2008 to improve accessibility for disabled users and upgrade the station and ticketing facilities. This was a pioneering modular design by Network Rail, with Mitcham Eastfields and Corby later constructed in the same way.

The subway has been replaced by a bridge with stairs and lift access at both ends. The new station entrance and booking hall lies directly between the bridge and the bus stop outside (see Fastrack below). Before the construction of this stop and its access road, buses had to stop some distance away downhill and passengers had to transfer via stairs and a footpath.

== Services ==
Services at Greenhithe are operated by Southeastern and Thameslink using Class 376, 465, 466, 700 and 707 EMUs.

The typical off-peak service in trains per hour is:

- 2 tph to London Charing Cross via Sidcup
- 2 tph to London Victoria via Bexleyheath
- 2 tph to Luton via Woolwich Arsenal and Greenwich
- 4 tph to Gravesend (2 of these run non-stop and 2 call at all stations)
- 2 tph to Rainham via Chatham

Additional services, including trains to and from London Cannon Street call at the station during the peak hours.

Preceding station	National Rail	Following station
Stone Crossing	Southeastern North Kent Line	Swanscombe
Stone Crossing	Thameslink North Kent Line	Swanscombe

== Connections ==
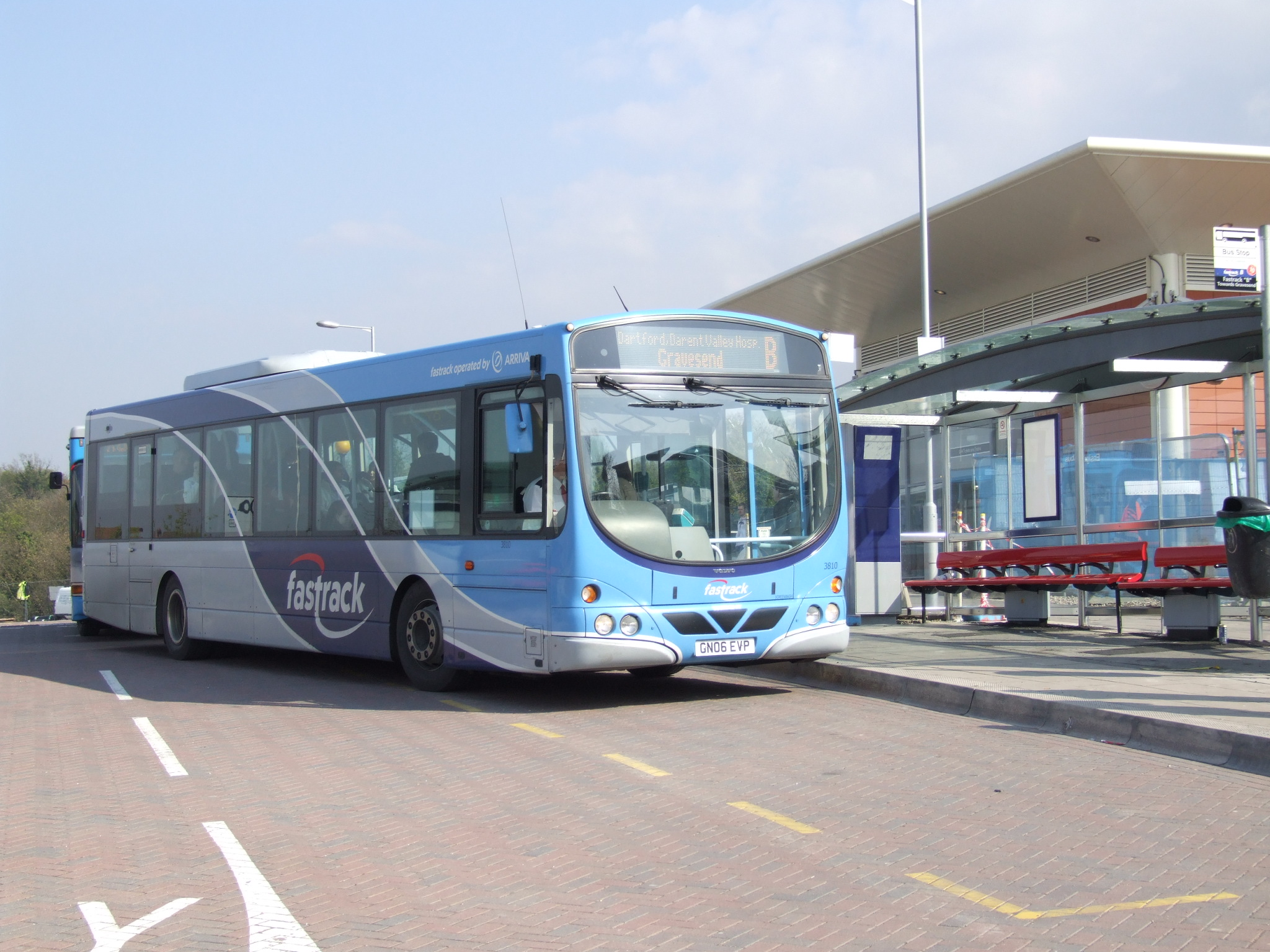
Fastrack bus outside the new booking hall at Greenhithe.

The station is served by a bus station from which frequent buses run to surrounding destinations.

The station is served by the Fastrack routes A, AZ and B which provide regular connections to Dartford, Temple Hill, Bluewater, Ebbsfleet International and Gravesend.

The station is also served by the Ensignbus route X80 which provides connections to Bluewater, Lakeside and Chafford Hundred.
