= ArrivaClick =

Demand responsive transport system

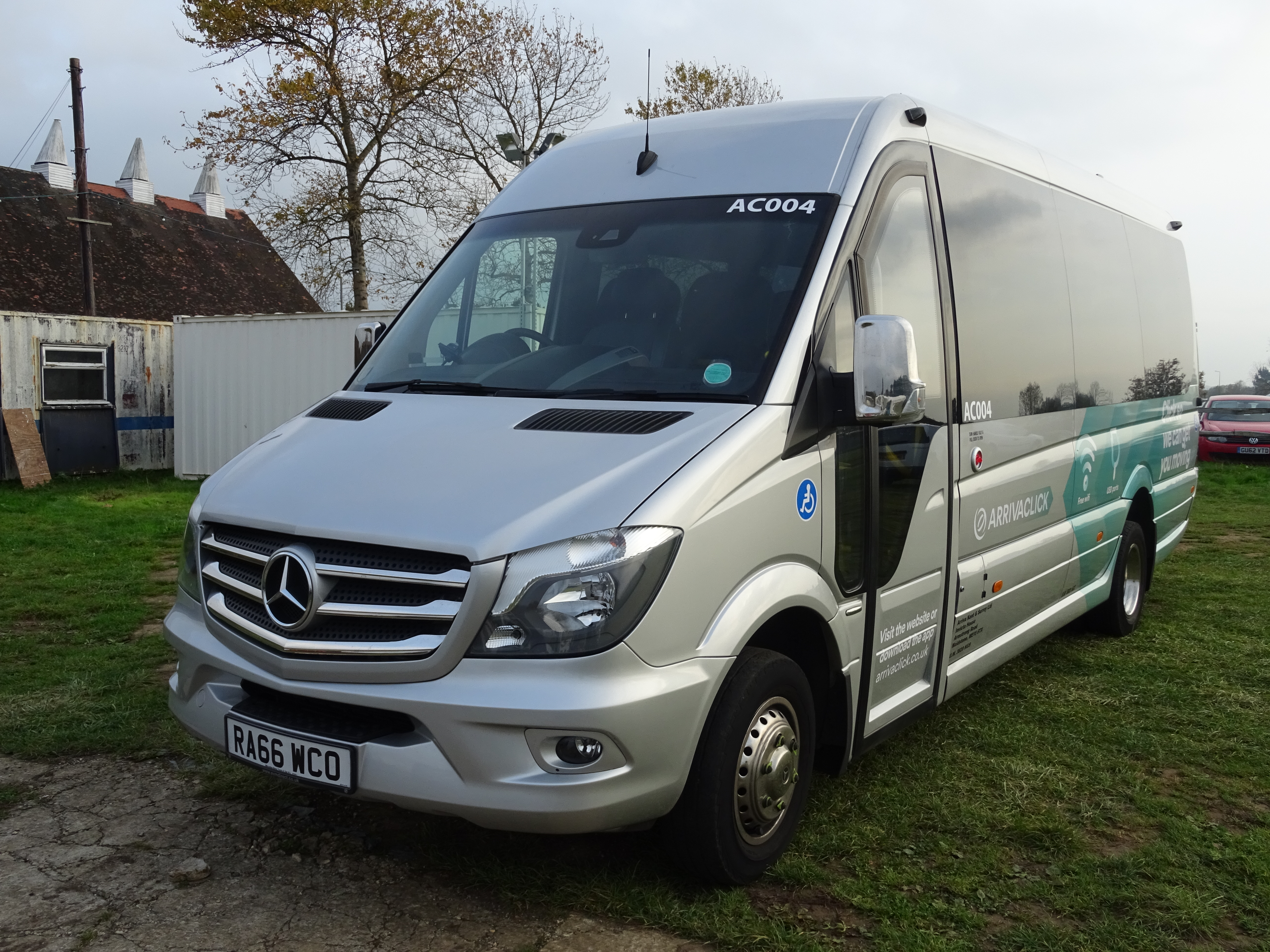
- Mercedes-Benz Sprinter in Paddock Wood in November 2017
- Parent: Arriva UK Bus
- Commenced operation: 2017
- Ceased operation: 2025
- Service type: Demand responsive transport
- Website: ArrivaClick

ArrivaClick was a demand responsive transport service operated by Arriva UK Bus. Passengers were able to book and pay for journeys via a smartphone app, which then would have matched passengers traveling between similar points, calculating an ad hoc route to the destinations required.

== History ==
ArrivaClick was launched in March 2017 in Sittingbourne, with Liverpool becoming the first city to be served by ArrivaClick in 2018.

It closed in April 2025, with the last area served being Speke.

== Former Operations ==
=== Sittingbourne ===
ArrivaClick in Sittingbourne was operated by Arriva Southern Counties. During November 2019 Arriva replaced the service with a fixed-route service in part of the area.

=== Liverpool ===
ArrivaClick began operations in Liverpool city centre and the southern areas of the city during December 2018. however in July 2020, Arriva announced that it would not be returning its operations to Liverpool after suspending services in March due to the COVID-19 pandemic

=== Leicestershire ===
Arriva Midlands commenced operating ArrivaClick services in partnership with developers of the New Lubbesthorpe housing estate in Leicestershire in April 2019. The Leicestershire operations were scaled back in October 2021 to operate during daytimes only.

Arriva Click operations in Leicester ceased on 31 July 2022 with Vectare East Midlands operating a replacement service Novus Direct and Novus Flex from 1 August.

=== Ebbsfleet ===
Arriva Kent Thameside commenced operating ArrivaClick services at Ebbsfleet on 30 November 2020. ArrivaClick operations in Ebbsfleet ceased on 31 December 2024. Go-Coach now runs Go2 and the CB1 bus service, two similar services, both running in Ebbsfleet, as well.

=== Speke ===
Arriva North West commenced operating ArrivaClick services in Speke on December in 2019. Operations ceased in April 2025, as services were to be replaced with local bus 211.

=== Watford ===
Arriva Click used to operate within Watford and the surrounding area but stopped operations on 31 December 2023 due to low passenger numbers.

== Fleet ==
ArrivaClick services were operated by Mercedes-Benz Sprinter minibuses. As of December 2018, it has a total of 30 vehicles.
