= Go-Ahead London =

London bus operator

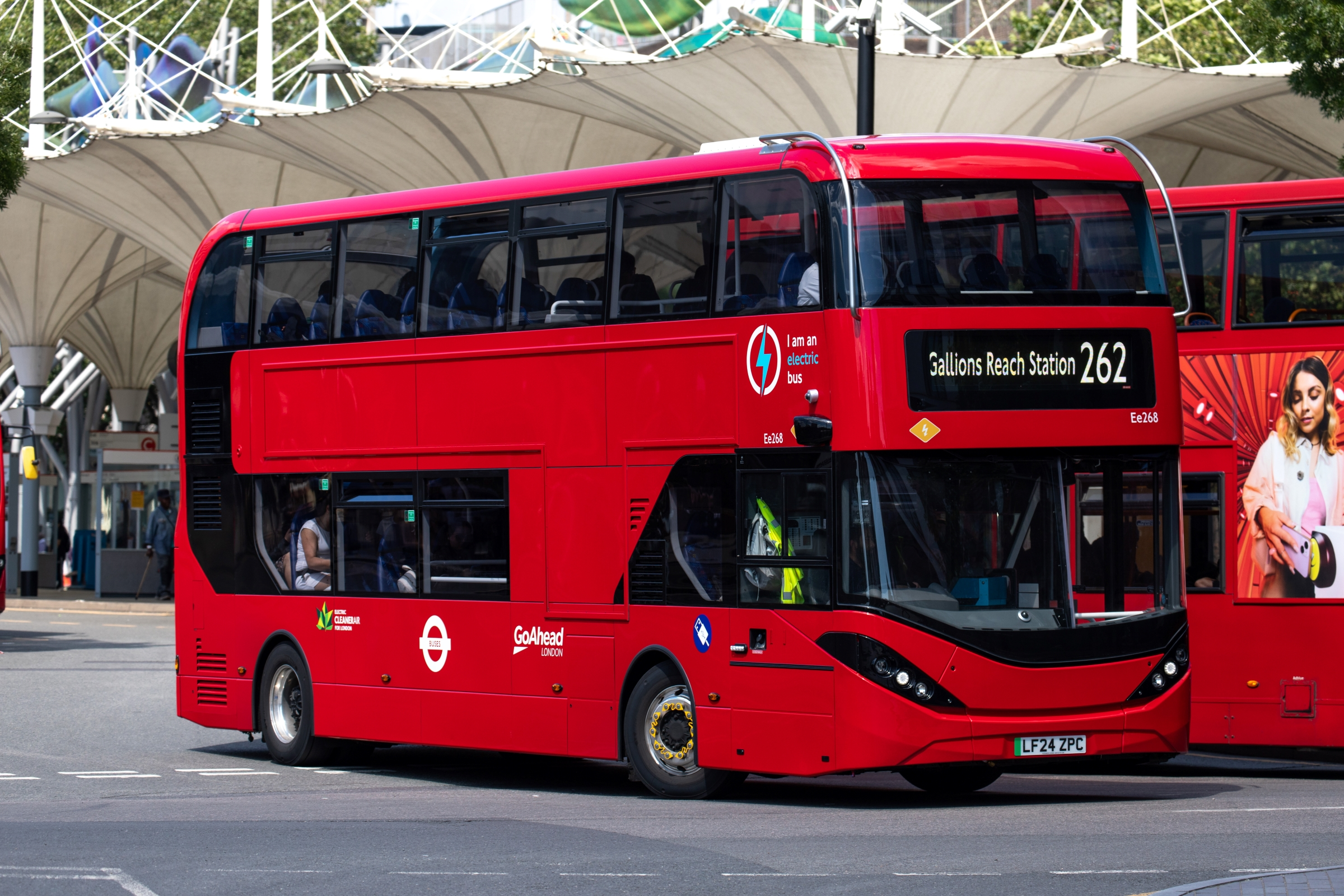
- BYD Alexander Dennis Enviro400EV on route 262 at Stratford bus station in July 2024
- Type: TfL bus operator
- Founded: September 1994; 32 years ago
- Headquarters: 18 Merton High Street, London, England
- Area served: Greater London
- Key people: Andrew Edwards (Managing Director)
- Number of employees: 9,000
- Parent: Go-Ahead Group
- Subsidiaries: London Central; London General; Docklands Buses; Blue Triangle; Metrobus (South East England); Fastrack; Kent Country
- Website: www.goaheadlondon.com

Go-Ahead London is a major bus operator in Greater London and parts of Kent and Surrey. The name first appeared in August 2008, before which the company had traded under separate names and brands. It is currently (as of April 2025) the largest bus operator in Greater London, operating a total of 157 bus routes mainly in South and Central London as well as some services into North and East London with a fleet size of 2,270 vehicles under contract to Transport for London. It is also the largest operator of electric buses in London, with a total of 540 electric vehicles.

== History ==
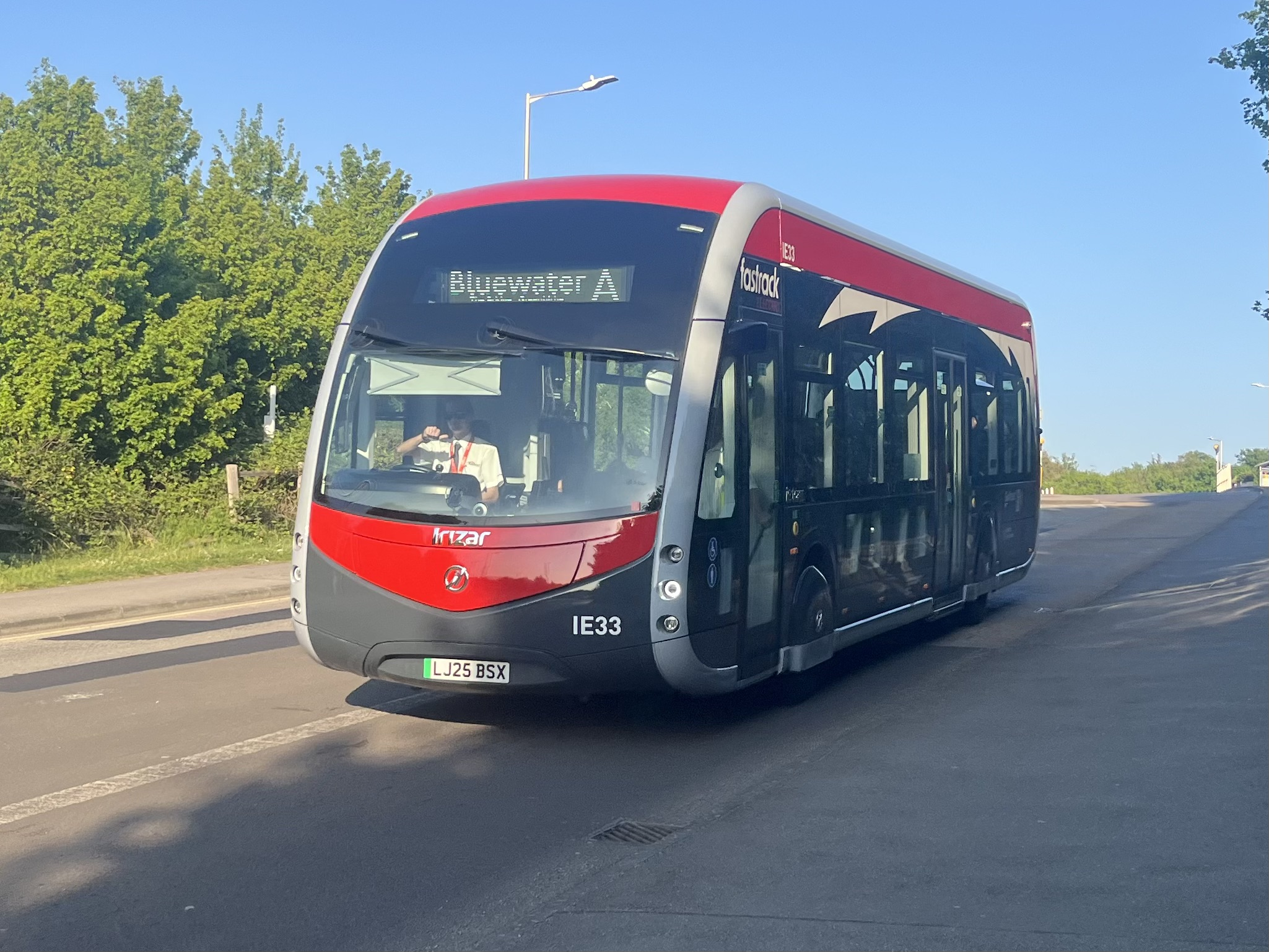
Go-Ahead London Fastrack Irizar ie tram at Greenhithe railway station in April 2025

The Go-Ahead Group is a large transport group based in Newcastle. It first became involved in London bus operations in September 1994, whereupon the privatisation of London Buses, it purchased London Central for £23.8 million. In May 1996, it added another former London Buses subsidiary, London General, which had been sold in 1994 to a management buyout for £46 million. These two companies subsequently developed in much the same way, both establishing a livery of red with a charcoal skirt and yellow relief band, and splitting orders for new buses.

Further expansion did not occur until September 2006, when Docklands Buses was purchased. On 29 June 2007, Go-Ahead London purchased Blue Triangle. With these purchases, Go-Ahead London surpassed Arriva London to become the largest operator of buses in London, running around 16% of London bus services.

A corporate image for Go-Ahead London bus routes started to appear in August 2008, when a new Go-Ahead London logo was unveiled.

In 2009, Transport for London invited bids for the sale of their own bus operations which ran under the East Thames Buses brand. Go-Ahead London were selected as the preferred bidder and assumed full responsibility for 10 routes and two depots in October that year. The East Thames Buses brand was replaced with the Go-Ahead London brand. The East Thames Buses operations were initially absorbed under the London General arm of Go-Ahead London's business. However, after some route movements and allocation changes some of the services now run under the London Central arm of Go-Ahead London's business.

On 30 March 2012, Go-Ahead London purchased Northumberland Park garage from First London with all routes brought under the London General arm of Go-Ahead London's business.

On 1 April 2014, the Go-Ahead Group restructured its Metrobus business, with the management of the Transport for London contracted services passing to the control of Go-Ahead London under its new Metrobus subsidiary, with the remaining commercial services being brought under the control of Brighton & Hove from 1 July 2014. Services are now operated under an expanded Go-Ahead London licence, however the Metrobus trading name is partially retained. Go-Ahead London's licence was formally increased by the Vehicle and Operator Services Agency on 25 April 2014 to accommodate the Metrobus buses.

In June 2023, it was announced that Go-Ahead London will take over the Kent Thameside services of the Fastrack bus rapid transit network from Arriva Kent Thameside. These services were taken over on 10 November 2024 temporarily using diesel buses as part of a 15-year contract between the operator and Kent County Council. Go-Ahead is to launch the service using a fleet of 28 battery electric Irizar ie tram buses by April 2025, creating Kent's first all-electric bus network; this fleet is garaged at a repurposed warehouse at Newtons Court in Stone in the Borough of Dartford.

In September 2025, it was announced that Go-Ahead London will take over route 477 between Orpington and Dartford from Arriva Kent Thameside. The service was taken over by Kent Country on 26 October 2025, operating out of Fastrack's Dartford garage, using three Alexander Dennis Enviro200s.

In February 2026, Go-Ahead London announced that they operated over 1,000 battery electric buses, with 13 of their garages operating battery electric buses. The number of Go-Ahead London garages operating battery electric buses increased to 14 in April 2026 after the delivery of 13 Alexander Dennis Enviro100EVs for newly acquired route 322.

== Current subsidiaries ==
The current subsidiaries of Go-Ahead London are, in order of acquisition:

- London Central (September 1994)
- London General (May 1996)
- Docklands Buses (September 2006)
- Blue Triangle (June 2007)
- Metrobus (April 2014)
- Fastrack (November 2024)
- Kent Country (October 2025)

=== Metrobus ===
==== Croydon (C) ====
Croydon garage operates routes 127, 157, 264, 403, 434, 439, 463, 633, S4 and SL7. Croydon garage also operates Surrey County Council-contracted routes 618, 668 and 669.

==== History ====
The Beddington Lane depot was opened by Metrobus in December 2005 to house route 127 which had been surrendered early by Centra. Work was completed on the garage buildings in February 2006. This garage took over the London routes that ran from Godstone with the exception of the 146 and 246 which moved to Orpington. In April 2014, Go-Ahead London took over this garage (and Orpington) from Metrobus, however the garages are still in the same place.

==== Orpington (MB) ====
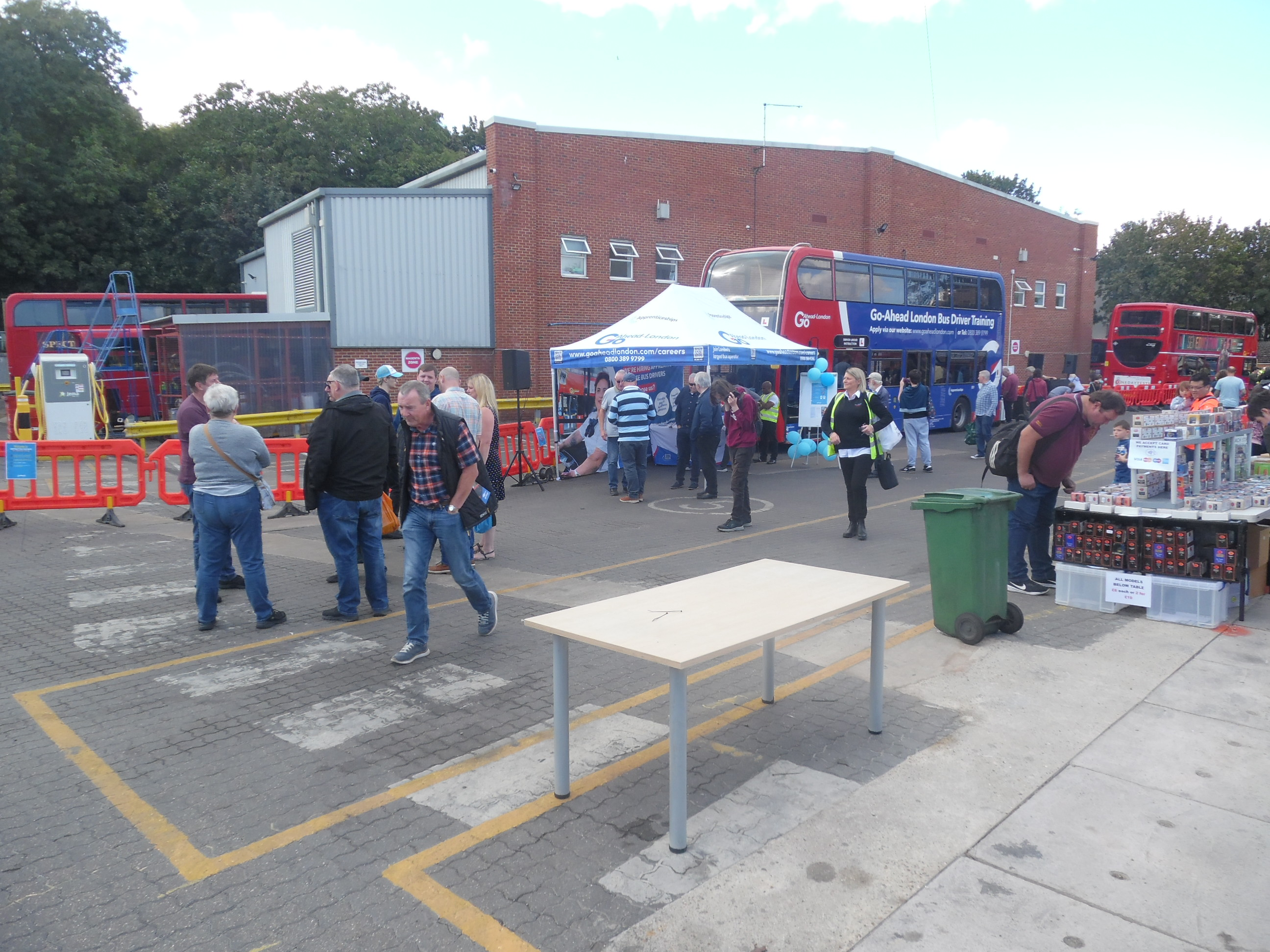
Orpington bus garage forecourt during an open day, September 2023

Orpington garage operates routes 233, 320, 353, 358, R1, R2, R3, R4, R5, R7, R8, R9, R10 and R11.

==== History ====
Formerly the site of Oak Farm, which was purchased, built upon and used as the base of the independent Orpington and District bus company until its collapse in February 1981, Orpington depot (also known as Green Street Green) was for many years the only garage for all of Metrobus' London tendered routes since the award of route 61 in 1986 (hence the MB code). The garage expanded during this period when Metrobus purchased their neighbours, Jasons Coaches. Orpington garage was one of eventually two Metrobus garages included in the sale of Metrobus to the Go-Ahead Group in September 1999, although the Metrobus brand was retained.

During mid-2005, major reconstruction started at Green Street Green to make improvements and provide an expansion. During these works, a temporary base to house 19 buses was constructed at Sevenoaks next to the base of what was the independent Southlands Travel.

On the evening of 21–22 November 2018, eleven buses were destroyed and several other buses were damaged in a fire that broke out at Orpington garage, requiring the callout of 60 London Fire Brigade firefighters to bring the fire under control. No injuries were reported and Orpington garage maintained a full service on the morning of 22 November, with numerous buses saved by being driven out onto Farnborough Way and surrounding roads.
