= Bluewater Shopping Centre =

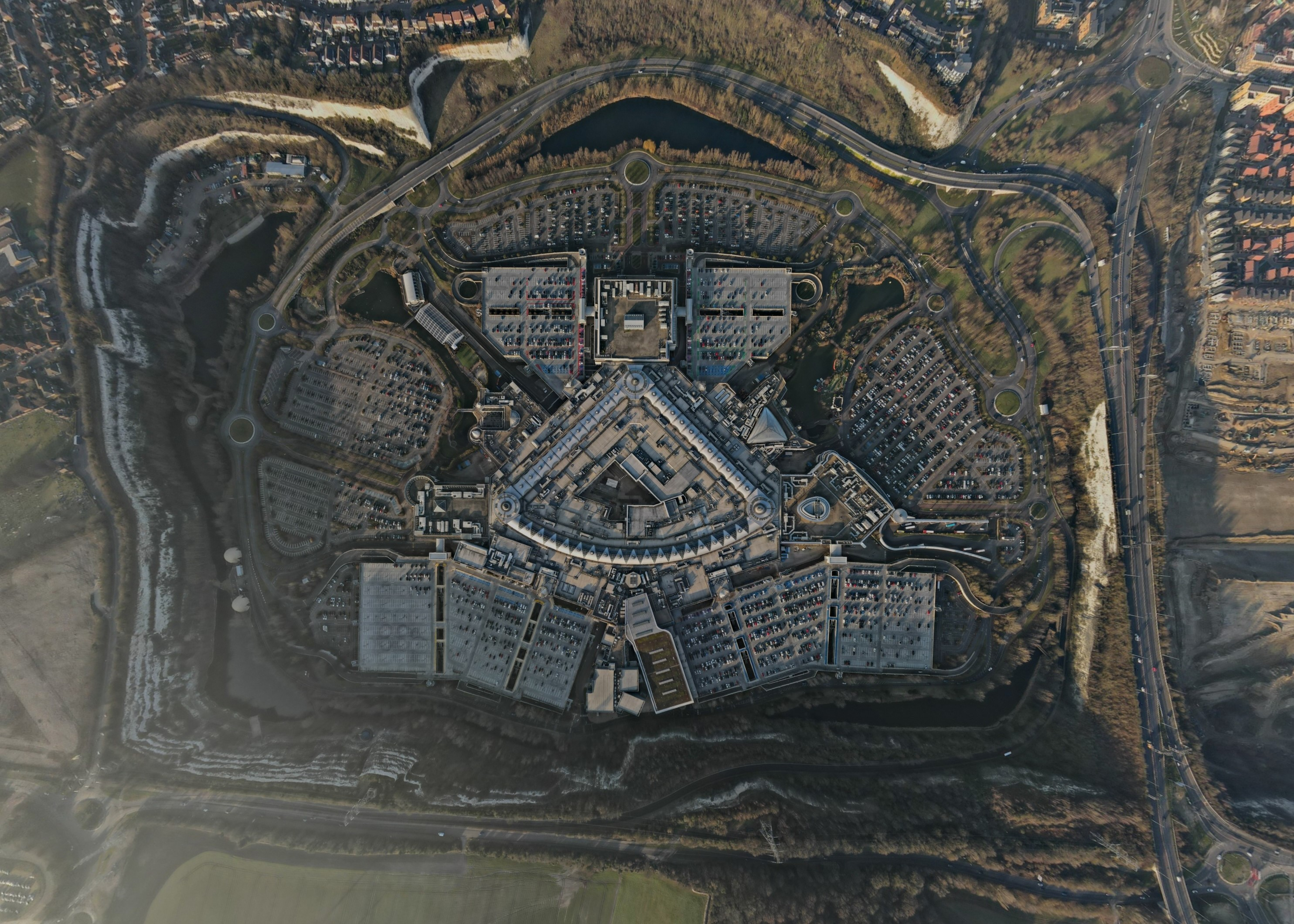
- Location: Western Quarry, Stone, Kent, England
- Coordinates: 51.4396°N 0.2712°E
- Opened: 16 March 1999; 27 years ago
- Developer: Lendlease
- Manager: Landsec
- Owner: Landsec (55%); M&G Real Estate (35%); Federated Hermes (10%)
- Architect: Eric Kuhne
- Num. of stores: 300
- Num. of anchor tenants: 3 (Marks & Spencer, John Lewis & Next)
- Floor area: 1,675,955 square feet (155,701.3 m^{2})
- Floors: 2 (3/4in parts)
- Parking: 13,000 cars 39 Pod Point spaces 17 Tesla Spaces; 15 coaches/motorhomes
- Public transit: Bluewater bus stop (see below)
- Website: bluewater.co.uk

Bluewater Shopping Centre is a large out-of-town shopping centre, located just outside Dartford, Kent, and accessible from the M25 motorway and A2. Opened on 16 March 1999 in a former chalk quarry after ten years of building works, the site (including car parks) occupies 240 acres (97 ha) and has a sales floor area of 154,000 m^{2} (1,600,000 ft^{2}) over three levels, making it the fifth-largest shopping centre in the UK (after Westfield London, MetroCentre, Trafford Centre and Westfield Stratford City). Elsewhere in Europe only Istanbul's Cevahir Mall and Vienna's (Vösendorf) Shopping City Süd are bigger. The floor plan is a triangular shape with 210 stores, including three anchors, 50 cafés and restaurants, and a 17-screen cinema. The centre employs 7,000 people and serves over 28 million visitors a year. A main rival is the Lakeside Shopping Centre and its two retail parks in West Thurrock, Essex, just across the River Thames, 8 miles (13 km) away by road or 3.2 miles (5.1 km) as the crow flies.

It is owned by three major UK institutions: Landsec (55%), M&G Real Estate (35%) and Federated Hermes (10%).

== History ==
=== Background ===
Early landscape

Early days of construction at Bluewater shopping centre, Dartford, September 1997.

Aerial view of the construction work at Bluewater shopping centre, Dartford, taken on 16 April 1998.

The shopping centre occupies land formerly known as Western Quarry, a site that was originally part of a predominantly rural landscape characterised by farmsteads including Swanscombe Manor Farm, Alkerden Manor Farm and Western Cross Farm, with Swansfield Lodge and Hedge Place Farm recorded in surveys from the 1860s. Local access was provided by minor roads and tracks, among them a route connecting Bean Road with Fieldfare Lane, while a tramway tunnel east of Fieldfare Lane linked the Portland Cement Works and Castle Chalk Pit, now lying beneath a roundabout on Bluewater Parkway.

=== Quarrying ===
The area was later extensively quarried for chalk, with workers' facilities present on site by 1954, and in 1963 an application was made to use part of the quarry for tipping waste products, though it was not approved. In 1978, Blue Circle Industries began filling the disused chalk pit to the west with inert works waste, and in 1980 Kent County Council approved a landscaping and restoration scheme for the site.

=== Development ===
Plans for a regional shopping centre at Western Quarry were first developed from 1985, when entrepreneur Godfrey Bradman's Rosehaugh, through its shopping centre subsidiary Shearwater, approached Blue Circle with proposals for a development on the site; in April 1986 the two companies combined their interests to form Bluewater plc, and formal proposals were subsequently advanced in 1986. The scheme was later approved in May 1990, when Environment Secretary Michael Heseltine granted planning permission following a "call-in" under the Town and Country Planning Act 1971, allowing the decision to be taken by central government. The approval covered approximately 1.5 million sq ft (139,354.6 m^{2}) of retail space and 125,000 sq ft (11,312.9 m^{2}) of leisure facilities, along with around 10,000 parking spaces and improved road access. The government also proposed amendments to the Kent Structure Plan to adjust Green Belt boundaries in north-west Kent to enable the development. This consent was granted prior to the later tightening of policy on out-of-town shopping centres introduced by John Gummer. The project was subsequently taken forward by Bluewater plc.

In 1994, quarry operator Blue Circle approached Australian mall developer Lendlease to form a partnership. Instead, Lend Lease bought the land (known as Western Quarry) and the project from Blue Circle, and, under the leadership of its CEO Peter Walichnowski, gathered a group of major investors, which included: Prudential, Barclays Mercantile, Hermes (acting for Britel), Lloyds Leasing, and Royal Bank Leasing. Lendlease also formed a pool of minor investors, called the Lend Lease Retail Partnership, with 18 institutions and corporations.

John Lewis was the first major tenant to sign up in February 1995, albeit with major concessions, such as the offer of 300,000 sq ft (28,000 m^{2}), one fifth of the entire floor space, on three levels. That gave Bluewater credibility to sign more names, including the two other anchor stores: House of Fraser followed in June 1996 by Marks & Spencer. 90% of the retail space was committed by March 1998.

Construction, undertaken by Bovis, commenced in March 1995. At its peak, the site employed 2,500 workers. In all, 20,000 people worked 11.5 million hours on the construction of Bluewater. As part of the wider works, Dartford Borough Council granted planning permission in March 1998 to widen New Bean Road between Hedge Place Roundabout and London Road Roundabout from a single to a dual carriageway, improving road access to the site ahead of opening. At the planned opening date, 16 March 1999, Bluewater was inaugurated with 99% of the shops open for business. The total cost of construction was around GBP £400 million. In December 2021 Lendlease sold its 25% shareholding to Landsec.

=== Redevelopment and expansion ===
With further expansion and development in the shopping centre industry since Bluewater's opening in 1999, perhaps most prominently the entry of Westfield London and Westfield Stratford City into the market, Bluewater has looked to make changes to its offering to keep the centre up to date and provide new and additional customer experiences. Numerous stores have been refurbished, expanded or relocated in recent years as the centre looks to expand and upgrade its mix of retailers, and there have been some major construction projects, mostly centred on the three leisure/dining 'villages', undertaken or proposed.

In late 2006, Dartford Borough Council granted planning permission for Bluewater to build a two-storey events venue of 5200 m^{2}, and further extend the south side of the centre. Construction on the extension began in early 2010, and when completed in 2011 the expansion added more restaurants to the Plaza (formerly Water Circus) section, including a Jamie's Italian, Wagamama and Browns. The new Glow events centre opened as part of the extension spans two floors, and has held events such as the BBC's Good Food Show: Spring. However, due to low visitors, Glow was closed in 2016, with the space being converted to extra cinema screens, a second Pizza Express restaurant, Creams Dessert Parlour, Rosa's Thai Cafe and Dinotropolis adventure play area on the Upper Level, and a GraVity Trampoline Park on the Lower Level. The events venue was developed alongside the existing entertainment provision in this area, the Showcase cinema which has been present in this area (initially as a Hoyts multiplex) since the opening of Bluewater.

In January 2012, the council also approved plans for a five-storey, 110-bedroom hotel at Bluewater Coach Park, though the permission expired in 2015 without the hotel being built. That same month, work also began on an extensive refurbishment of the Wintergarden food court off Rose Gallery. Much of the food court was closed for part of the year to enable the work, with McDonald's notably unavailable at Bluewater throughout the period, though the Pizza Hut, Nando's restaurants to the far side of the area (by the centre entrance), and the Ponti's restaurant on the upper mall, remained open during the works. KFC relocated to Thames Walk to continue to trade during the development. When the Wintergarden works completed in October 2012, McDonald's, KFC and Harry Ramsden's returned to their post, along with several new food outlets, most significantly a new Giraffe restaurant (later occupied by Wingstop) which had been constructed adjacent McDonald's. The previous large 'castle'-style McDonald's was replaced with a simple serving counter.

A proposal was put forward in early 2013 to expand the West Village dining and specialist retail area currently sited off the Guildhall. This currently comprises a Waterstones bookshop, a training and recruitment facility, and Costa Coffee shop on the upper mall, and on the lower mall a row of boutique retailers including The Daily Grind, Mr Simms Olde Sweet Shop, Gusto & Daisy's Dog Emporium leading out to a suite of restaurants including Carluccio's, PizzaExpress and others. The proposal would see much of the existing infrastructure demolished and replaced with a new larger two-level 'specialist retail' area, similar to 'The Village' at Westfield London, with upmarket retail and restaurant facilities and mall access to both levels. Existing businesses would have to be relocated or removed from the centre to allow the works to go ahead. The proposed redevelopment ultimately did not go ahead, with The Village retaining its extant configuration.

In 2024 it was confirmed that one of the mall's original anchors, House of Fraser, was to close after 25 years in operation. In November 2024 it was announced that Next would be relocated into the vacated space, moving from their existing premises on Thames Walk. The new Next superstore opened on 30 July 2026.

The centre is visited by over 27 million people a year and employs around 7,000 people.

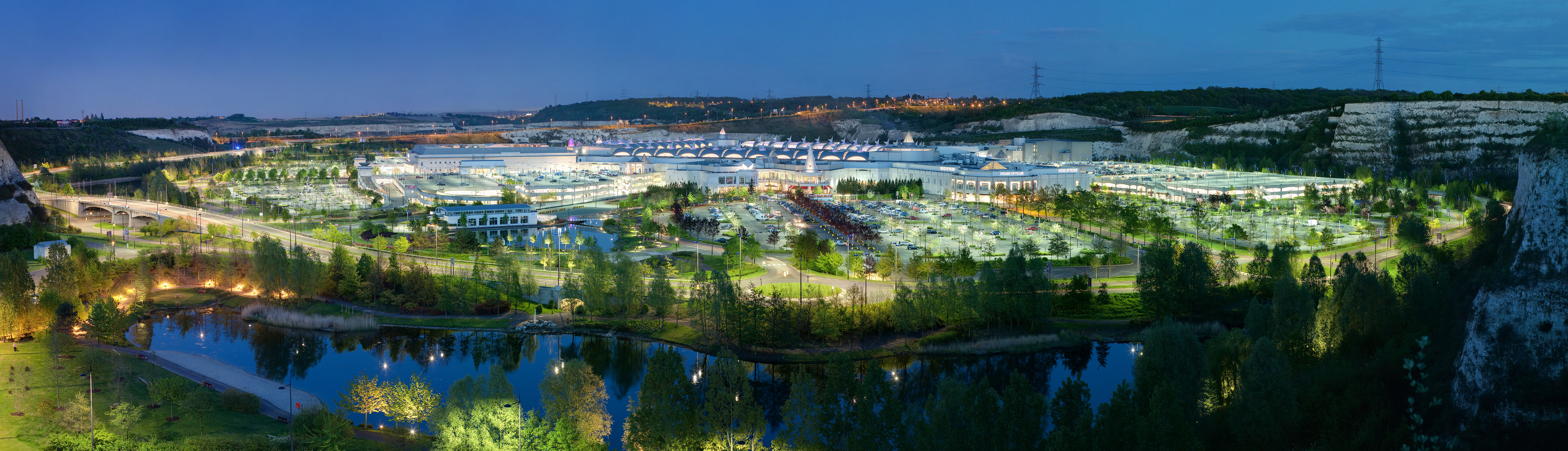
A panoramic view of Bluewater Shopping Centre at dusk

== Architecture ==
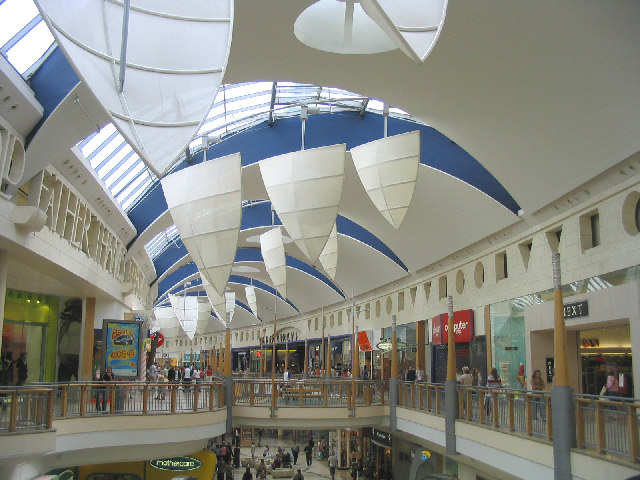
Bluewater "Thames Walk"

The principal architect was Eric Kuhne. Other firms involved in the design and branding were Benoy, BDG McColl, RTKO, Henrion Ludlow & Schmidt and Minale Tattersfield.

The main building is a triangle of three malls: Thames Walk, Guildhall and Rose Gallery, with one anchor store at each corner. Curved and tapered glass sections form the roofing over each mall, providing significant natural lighting. The roof vents are inspired by Kentish oast houses.

There are statues of historic trades along the walls above the upper level.

== Transport ==
=== Parking ===
There are over 13,000 free parking spaces including disabled parking, across six car parks. As of 27 May 2022, Bluewater offers 39 Pod Point spaces and 17 Tesla spaces for EV Charging across the site.

=== Rail ===
The nearest railway station to Bluewater is Greenhithe for Bluewater, 1.5 miles away. It is served by Southeastern and Thameslink trains to Luton, London Cannon Street, London Charing Cross, London Victoria, Gravesend and Rainham.

=== Buses ===
Arriva Southern Counties, Go-Ahead London (Fastrack routes), GoBus, Ensignbus, National Express and London Buses routes 96, 428 and 492 serve Bluewater bus station.

=== Bean Road Underpass ===
The Bean Road Underpass is a major planned 75-metre road and bus transit tunnel linking the Whitecliffe/Eastern Quarry housing development with the Bluewater Shopping Centre. Built beneath the B255 Bean Road, it will carry a dedicated Fastrack bus lane alongside a shared pedestrian and cycle path, providing a direct, congestion-free public transport connection between Ebbsfleet Garden City and Bluewater. The project reuses and adapts two existing 1990s haulage tunnels and forms part of the wider Fastrack bus rapid-transit network.

First conceived in the late 1990s, the scheme received initial planning permission in 2020, which later lapsed, before being reapproved on 6 March 2025. Costs have risen from an original £13 million estimate to about £25.5 million, funded through a mix of local development grants and Department for Transport support. In January 2026, Kent County Council awarded an £18 million construction contract to Erith Contractors. Preparatory works are due to begin in early 2026, with main construction starting in spring 2026 and completion expected in 2027, subject to strict environmental and ecological protections.
