= Temple Hill, Kent =

Coordinates: 51.449720°N 0.225170°E

Temple Hill
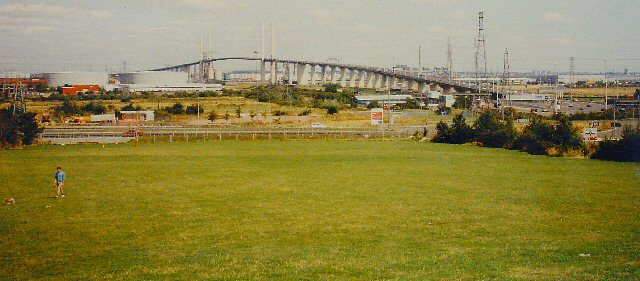
- Public open space in Temple Hill

- Location within Kent
- District: Dartford
- Shire county: Kent
- Region: South East
- Country: England
- Sovereign state: United Kingdom
- Post town: Dartford
- Postcode district: DA1
- Police: Kent
- Fire: Kent
- Ambulance: South East Coast
- UK Parliament: Dartford

Temple Hill is a suburb of Dartford in Kent, England. It takes its name from the Knights Templar order. Temple Hill extends from the west of the A282 (Dartford Crossing) in the east to Dartford town centre in the west. It is one of the largest suburban regions of Dartford. Temples Manor, known as the manor of Dartford Temples, took its name from the Knights Templars who were the original landowners. The manor appears to have included the whole of the lands from Temple Hill on the north eastern edge of the town, right down to the River Thames. The manor also incorporated the Waterside district of Dartford and the area around the River Cranpit on the south side of the High Street, at the junction of Lowfield Street. The prior of St John of Jerusalem was the principal landholder within the manor.

== Transport ==
Temple Hill is served by the Fastrack bus system, and route 480 by Arriva.
