= Fastrack (bus rapid transit) =

Bus rapid transit scheme in Kent, England

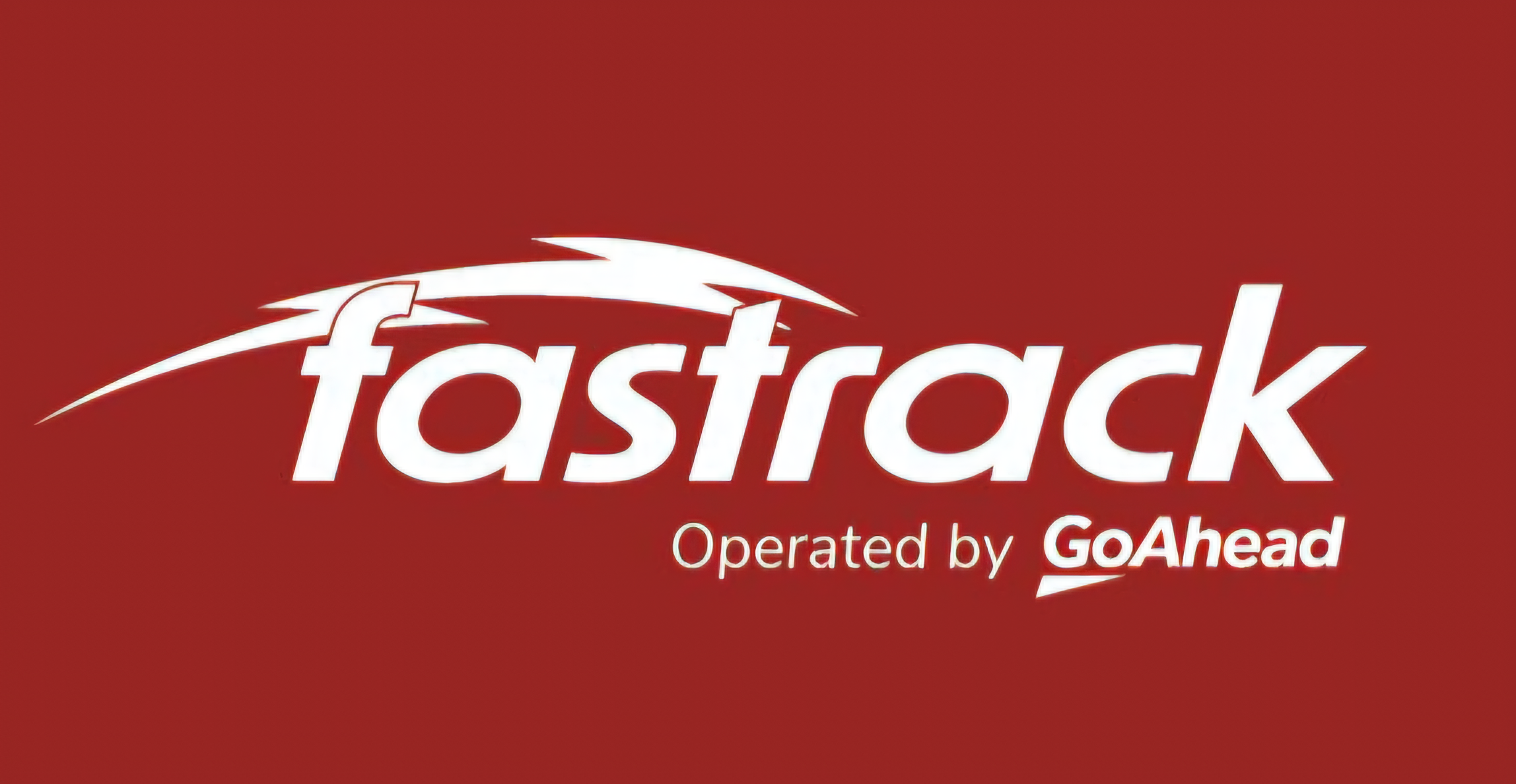

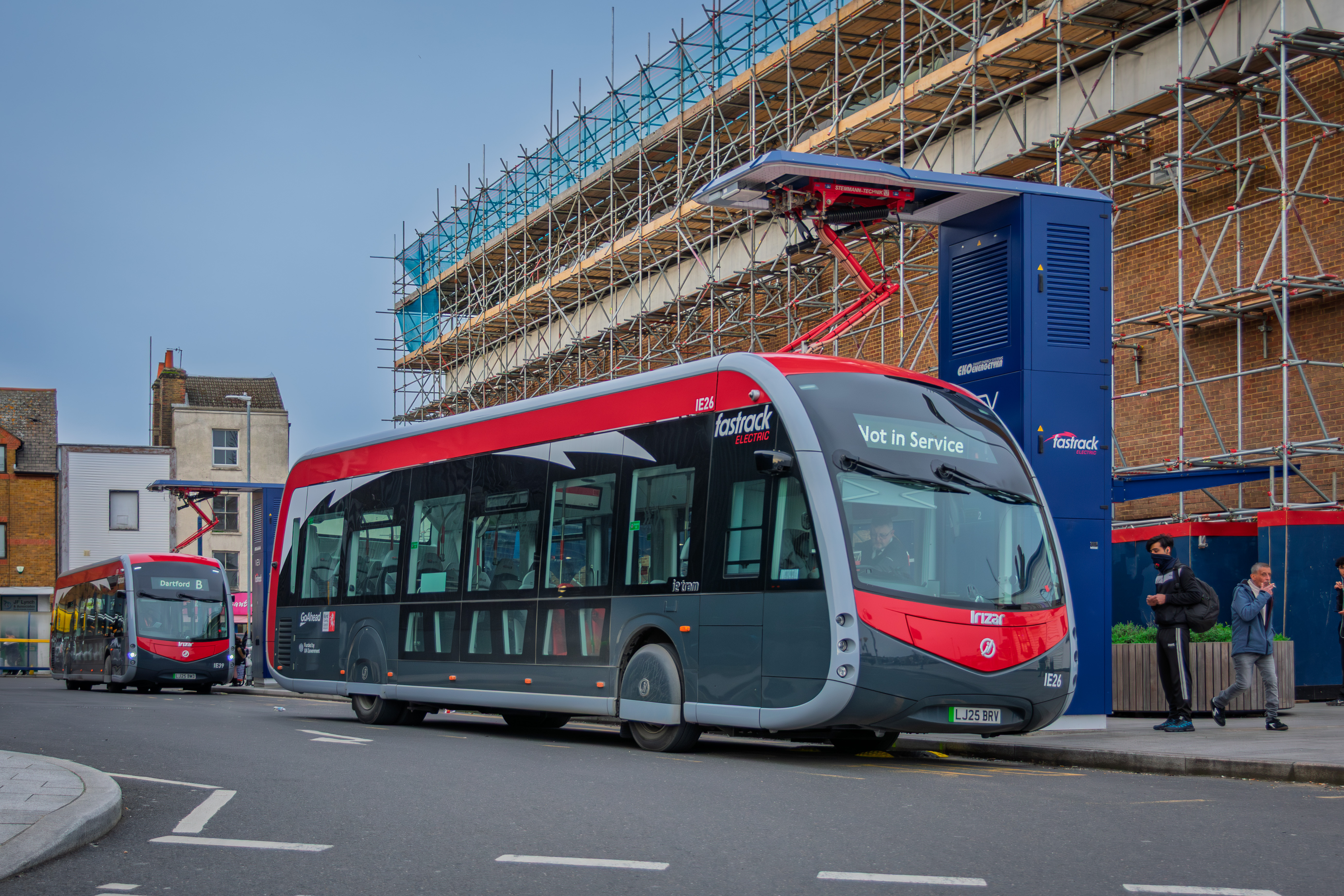
- Irizar ie tram buses of Fastrack using pantograph charging at Gravesend railway station in March 2026

Overview
- Locale: Kent Thameside; Dover
- Transit type: Bus rapid transit
- Number of lines: 7
- Website: www.kent-fastrack.co.uk

Operation
- Began operation: 26 March 2006; 20 years ago (Kent Thameside); 17 November 2024; 23 months ago (Dover)
- Operators: Go-Ahead London; Stagecoach South East

Fastrack is the name given to two bus rapid transit schemes in Kent. The original network began on 26 March 2006 in Dartford and Gravesend, part of the Thames Gateway regeneration area, and on 17 November 2024 a separate network was launched in Dover.

== Overview ==
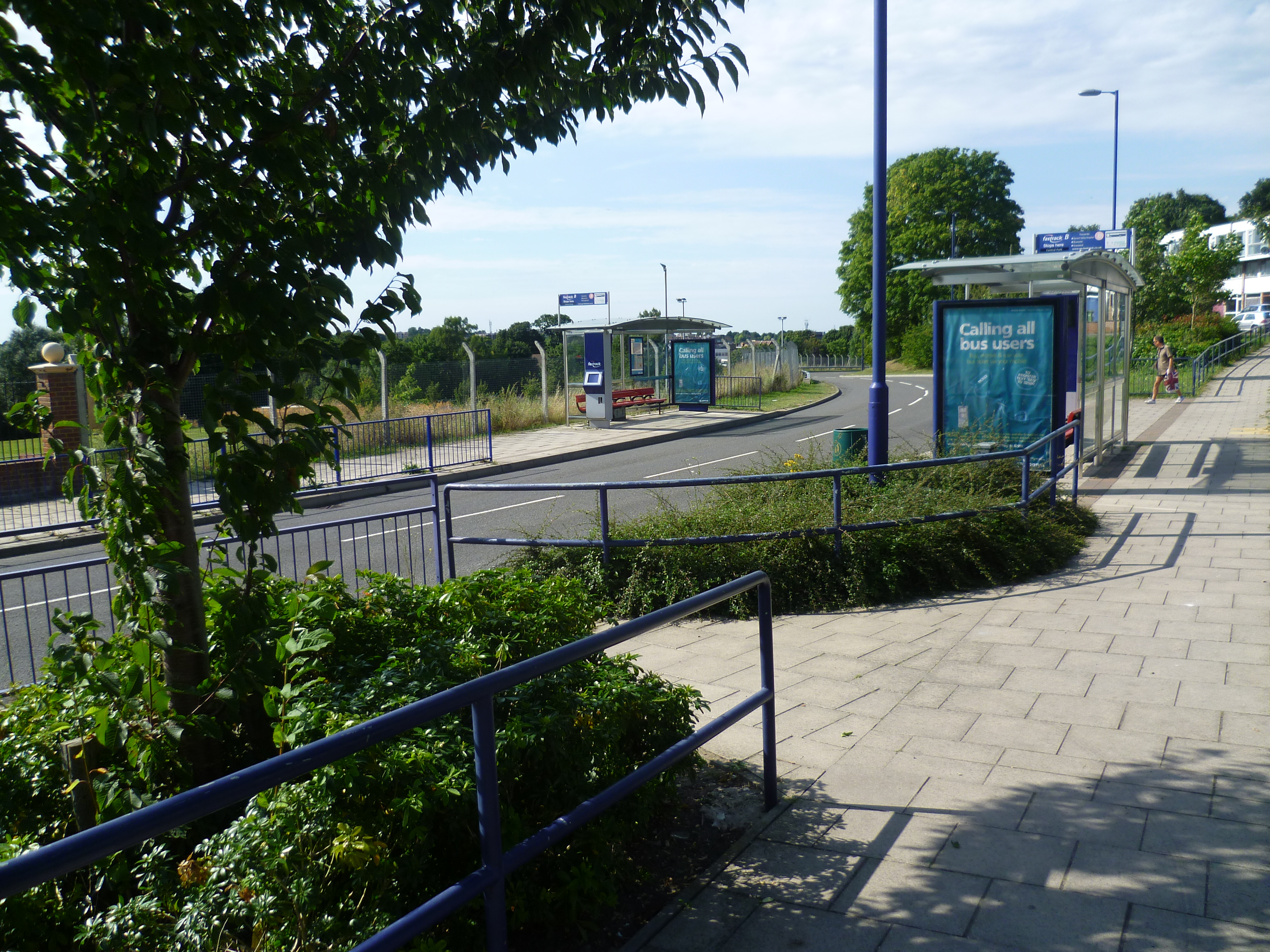
Segregated Fastrack busway in Dartford

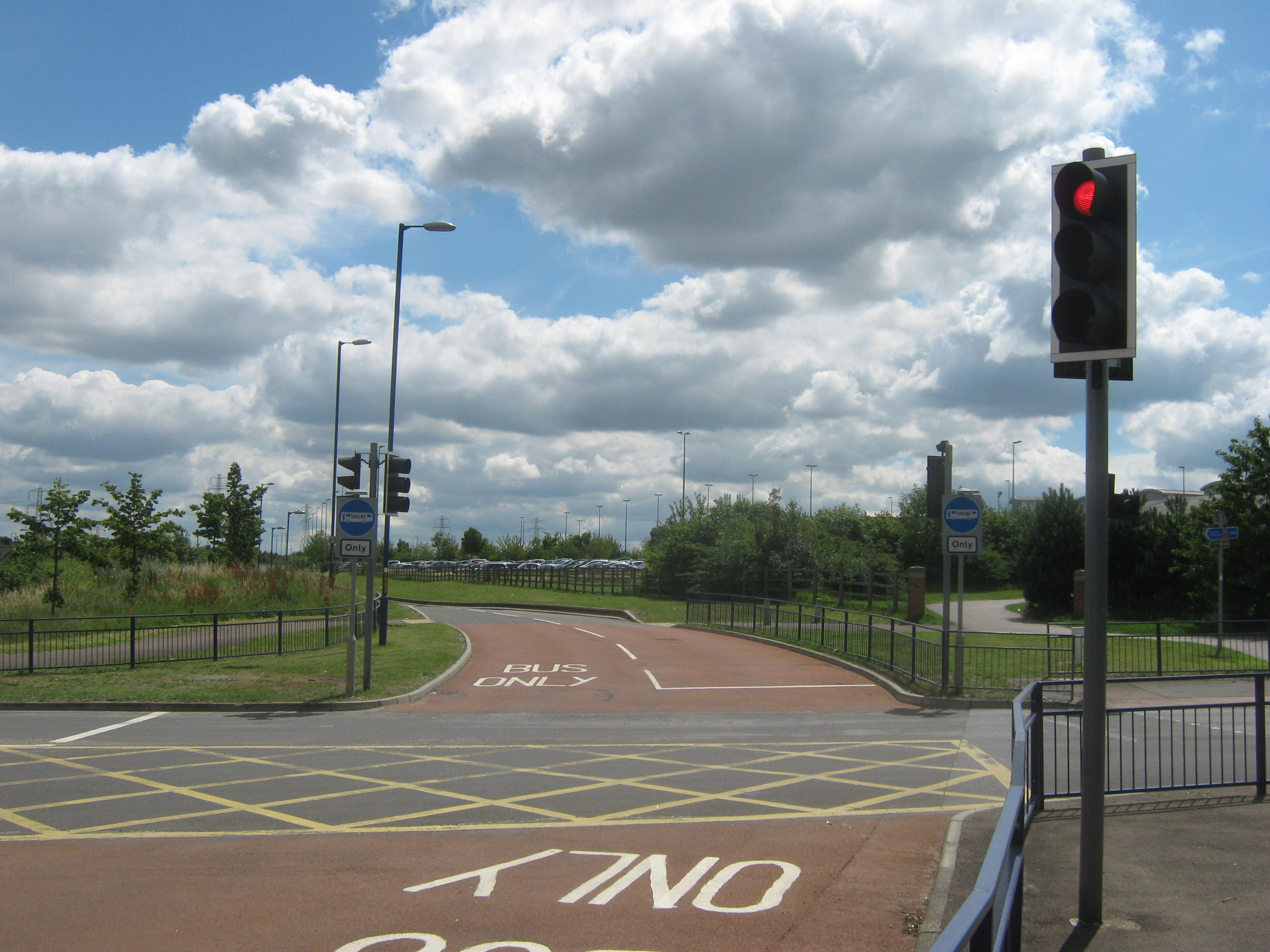
Fastrack bus priority signal near Darent Valley Hospital

Fastrack aims to improve bus services in Kent Thameside and Dover, supporting redevelopment in the areas it serves and connecting major new and existing developments. As a bus rapid transit system, Fastrack is positioned in the public transport hierarchy between existing railways and other local bus services and is intended to deliver the capacity and speed of rail transit with the lower costs, simplicity and flexibility of a bus system.

The network includes various bus priority measures in order to improve journey times and reliability by reducing the impact of traffic congestion on services. These include segregated bus lanes on which only Fastrack buses are allowed to run and priority at traffic lights to allow buses to bypass congestion.

== History ==
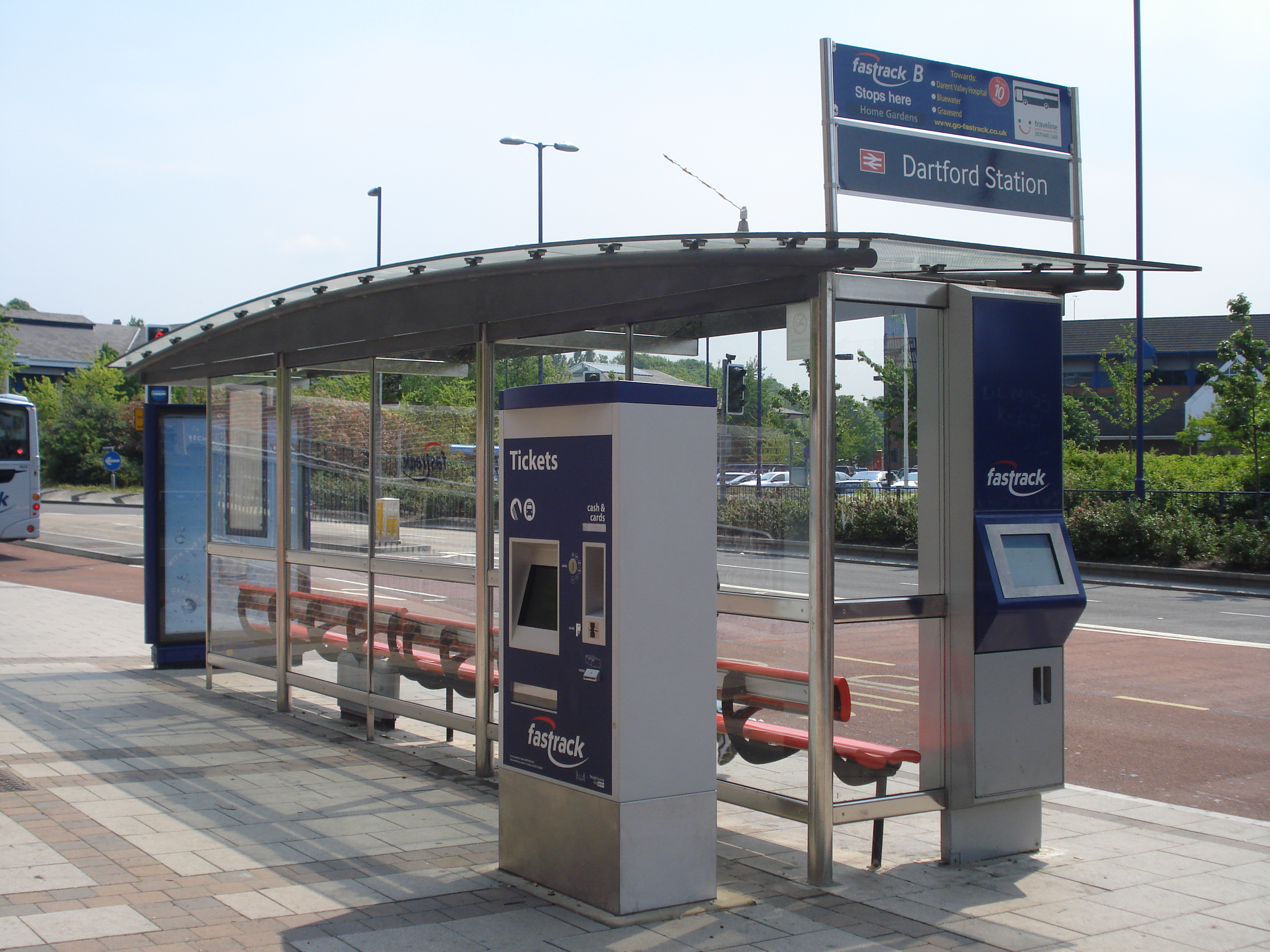
Fastrack Stop in Dartford, used before Go Ahead London acquired the Kent Thameside network

=== Kent Thameside ===
Construction work on the Fastrack network in Kent Thameside began on 23 September 2004. The network commenced operations on 26 March 2006 with the introduction of Fastrack B between Temple Hill and Gravesend.

On 3 June 2007, Fastrack A commenced operations in order to serve the new development at The Bridge in Dartford. The route is part-funded by Prologis, the developers of The Bridge.

From 19 November 2007 following the opening of Ebbsfleet International railway station, Fastrack B was diverted to serve the station in order to connect with Eurostar and Southeastern High Speed services.

Following the completion of the Everards Link Phase 2 on 10 December 2012, Fastrack B was rerouted via a new section of busway linking Ingress Park with Greenhithe railway station. Fastrack B began serving the whole of the Ingress Park development from 2 September 2018.

From 2 August 2020 following the opening of the Springhead Bridge, Fastrack B was rerouted between Ebbsfleet International railway station and Gravesend to serve the new Springhead Park development.

On 23 August 2021, Fastrack AZ commenced operations in order to serve the Amazon LCY3 distribution centre in Dartford. The route was initially operated by Go-Coach but transferred to Arriva Southern Counties on 3 April 2022 with Fastrack A being modified to serve the LCY3 distribution centre at the same time.

In June 2023, it was announced that Go-Ahead London had been awarded a 15 year contract to operate the Kent Thameside network, starting in November 2024. On 10 November 2024, the Kent Thameside network was taken over by Go-Ahead London. On the same day, Fastrack E commenced operations, initially running from Gravesend to Castle Hill in order to serve the Castle Hill and Cable Wharf developments.

From 16 August 2025, following the opening of the Whitecliffe busway, Fastrack E was extended to serve Bluewater.

From 26 March 2026, Fastrack celebrated its 20th Anniversary.

From 16 May 2026, Fastrack running day was held at Dartford, Bluewater and Gravesend.

From 1 August 2026, Fastrack C commenced operations between Ingress Park and Gravesend, serving Greenhithe Station, Bluewater Shopping Centre, Castle Hill, Ebbsfleet International Station, and Cable Wharf, replacing Fastrack routes E and F.

=== Dover ===
Construction work on the Fastrack system in Dover began in February 2023 and infrastructure works were completed in Summer 2024.

The system was launched on 17 November 2024. Route D runs between Dover and Whitfield and is now operated by Stagecoach South East.

== Current routes ==
=== Kent Thameside ===
The current Fastrack network in Kent Thameside is formed of six routes, all operated by Go-Ahead London.

Fastrack A operates between Dartford station and Bluewater Shopping Centre via Temple Hill, The Bridge, Amazon LCY3, Stone Crossing station and Greenhithe station. It operates every 15 minutes daily.

Fastrack AZ operates between Dartford station and Gravesend station via Temple Hill, The Bridge, Amazon LCY3, Stone Crossing station, Greenhithe station and Ebbsfleet International station. It operates during shift changeover times at the LCY3 distribution centre only.

Fastrack B operates between Temple Hill and Gravesend station via Dartford station, Princes Park, Darent Valley Hospital, Bluewater Shopping Centre, Castle Hill, Ebbsfleet International station and Springhead Park. It operates every 12 minutes daily.

Fastrack C operates between Ingress Park and Gravesend station via Greenhithe Station, Bluewater Shopping Centre, Castle Hill, Ebbsfleet International station and Cable Wharf. Services from Ingress Park to Bluewater operate every 15 minutes, with buses every 30 minutes extending to Gravesend.

Fastrack N operates between Amazon LCY3 and Gravesend station via The Bridge, Temple Hill, Dartford station, Princes Park, Darent Valley Hospital, Bluewater Shopping Centre, Castle Hill, Ebbsfleet International station and Springhead Park. It operates hourly overnight only.

=== Dover ===
The current Fastrack network in Dover is formed of one route, operated by Stagecoach South East.

Fastrack D operates between Dover Priory station and Whitfield via Dover town centre and Dover Castle. It operates every 20 minutes on weekdays and Saturdays, and hourly on Sundays.

== Vehicles ==
=== Kent Thameside ===
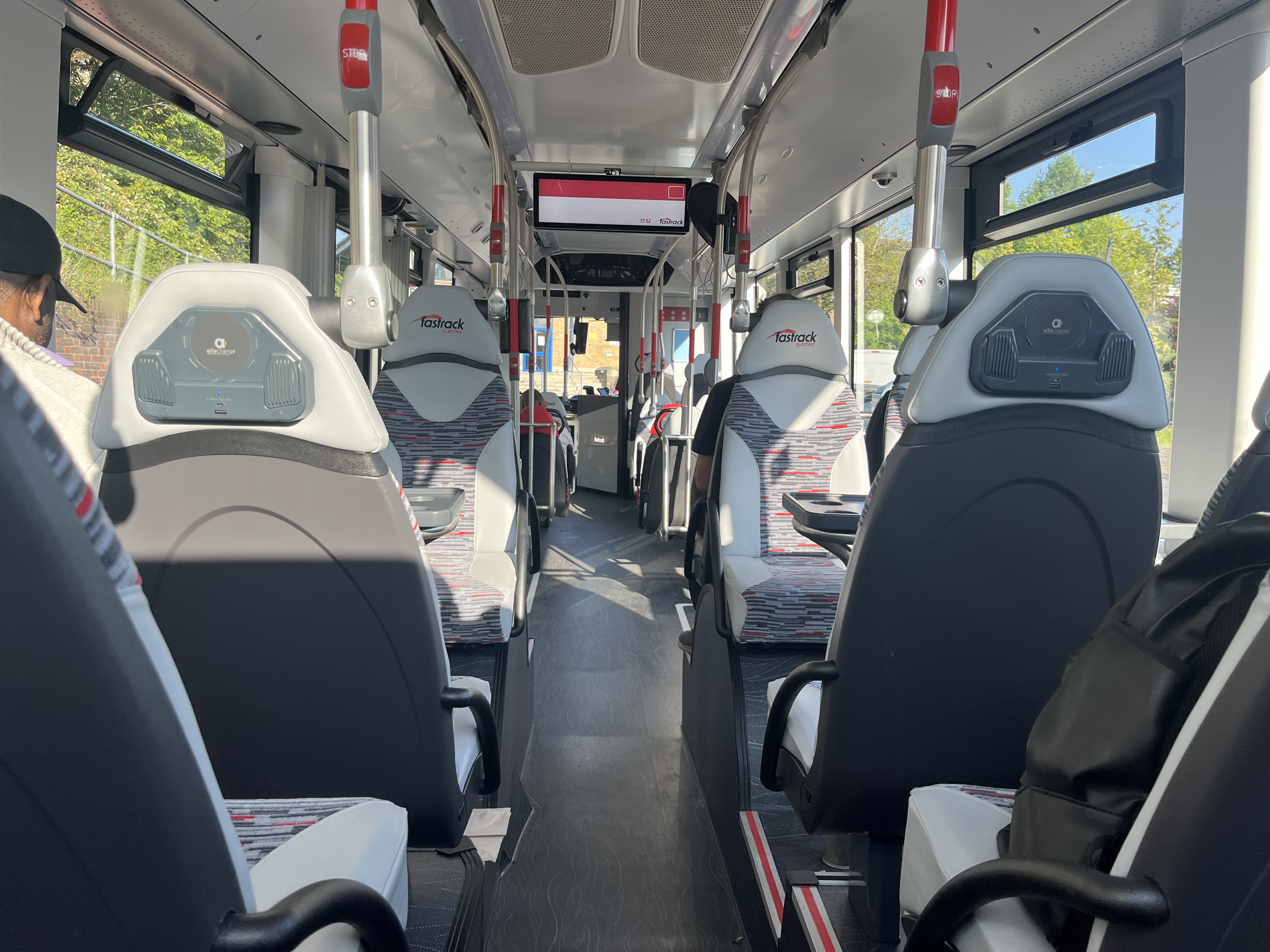
The interior of a Fastrack Irizar ie tram

The vehicles used on the Fastrack routes, which are Irizar ie trams, are tagged in order to allow them to use the various bus priority measures across the network. This allows them to enter segregated bus lanes and change traffic light sequences to give the buses priority over other vehicles.

The buses are also marketed with a number of features to improve travel experience, including free WiFi, USB charging points and next stop announcements.

Between 21 March and 9 May 2018, the first Volvo 7900 electric bus was introduced to the Fastrack network in Kent Thameside network as part of a trial period.

Following the takeover of the Kent Thameside network by Go-Ahead London on 10 November 2024 and the introduction of the Dover service on 17 November 2024, Fastrack is planned to be the first fully electric bus network in Kent, with the first new Irizar ie tram electric buses entering service during 25 April 2025 and 22 January 2026.

=== Dover ===
The Dover service was launched by Stagecoach South East using a fleet of pre-existing diesel-powered Alexander Dennis Enviro200 MMCs. On 23 February 2026, five MCV C103 EV bodied Volvo BZL single-deck electric buses equipped with pantograph chargers were launched into service on the Dover network.

== Bean Road Underpass ==
The Bean Road Underpass is a planned Fastrack bus rapid‑transit infrastructure project. It involves constructing a new 75 m underpass through the chalk ridge beneath B255 Bean Road between the Whitecliffe/Eastern Quarry housing development and Western Quarry to provide a direct, uncongested route for Fastrack services. It will include a dedicated 3.5 m‑wide Fastrack busway alongside a shared pedestrian and cycle path. Once completed it will form part of the Fastrack network serving Dartford and Gravesham, improving public transport connectivity between Ebbsfleet Garden City, Bluewater, and beyond. Planning permission was granted in March 2025, with construction expected to begin in early 2026 and finish by 2027 under Kent County Council’s delivery, and an £18 million construction contract has been awarded.

== See also ==
- List of guided busways and BRT systems in the United Kingdom
- Crawley Fastway, a similar-sized guided system
