= Erith Group =

British demolition contractor

- Type: Private limited company
- Industry: Demolitions Contractor
- Founded: 1967
- Fate: Active
- Headquarters: London, England

Erith Group is the largest demolition contractor in the United Kingdom.

== History ==
Along with the wider construction sector, Erith Group experienced a period of protracted economic hardship following the start of the Great Recession. During the late 2010s, the company's ownership was transferred to an employee-owned trust. Around this time, the company was also introducing remotely-controlled equipment with the aim of increasing the safety margin of its projects.

In June 2022, Edith Group was one of eight companies to admit its involvement in the rigging of bids. For its role in the scandal, the company fined £17.6 million by the Competition and Markets Authority (CMA); this fine was attributed for the firm incurring a pre-tax loss of £13.8 million in 2023. During the following year, subsidiary company Erith Plant Services was fined £175,000 for health and safety violations relating to the death of an employee caused by a falling excavator attachment.

During April 2026, the group recorded a pre-tax profit of £8 million over the previous financial year and observed that rising costs had outpaced revenue growth during that time.
