= GoBus (Kent bus company) =

Bus operator in the South of England

- A GoBus Caetano e.City Gold in Detling in April 2026
- Founded: 1 February 2008
- Headquarters: Swanley
- Service area: Kent; East Sussex; South London
- Service type: Bus routes
- Routes: 40
- Hubs: Sevenoaks, Swanley, Dartford, Edenbridge, Tonbridge, Royal Tunbridge Wells
- Fleet: 52 (December 2025)
- Chief executive: Austin Blackburn
- Website: www.gobus.uk

Go-Coachhire Limited, trading as GoBus, is a bus operator running a total of 37 bus routes (including school routes) across Kent and Sussex. The majority of these routes are operated on behalf of Kent County Council from their garage in Swanley.

== History ==
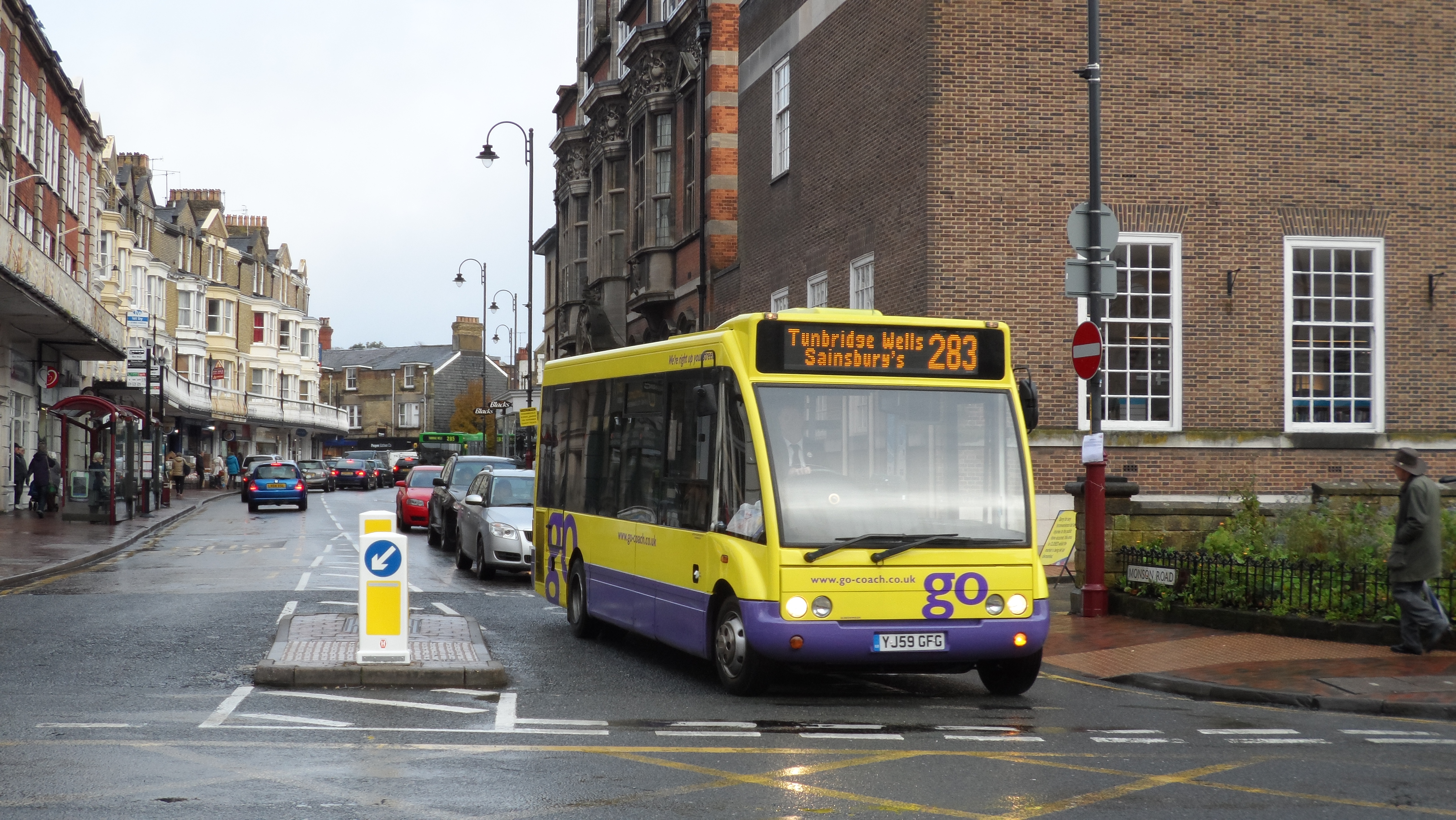
A Go-Coach Optare Solo in Royal Tunbridge Wells in November 2013

Go-Coach was founded on 1 February 2008 by Austin Blackburn. The company began operating as a coach hire company initially just using a single coach.

In April 2010, Go-Coach began operating bus routes for the first time when they took over the Kent County Council tendered routes 401 (Sevenoaks to Westerham) and 421 (Sevenoaks to Swanley) from Arriva Southern Counties. In May 2011, Go-Coach extended route 421 to Dartford to replace the Arriva Southern Counties route 423 bringing the operator into the town for the first time. The companies Dartford routes were further boosted with the instruction of the Dart local town routes in 2014.

In April 2014, Go-Coach expanded its operations into Edenbridge by taking over routes 232, 234, 238, 631 and 632 from Arriva Southern Counties. A number of its Sevenoaks services were altered at the same time.

In 2015, a number of Go-Coach routes were boosted. The company took over a number of Kent County Council-contracted routes as well as introducing new circular town route 8 in Sevenoaks at the same time. Go-Coach also upgraded and took over existing route 401 on a commercial basis in 2015, this being the first time that the company had operated a bus route in this way.

In July 2017, Go-Coach introduced two new routes in Sevenoaks (routes 431 and 435) in response to Arriva Southern Counties withdrawing major parts of their route 402 route at the same time.

In April 2019, Arriva Southern Counties withdrew a number of their local routes in Sevenoaks. Go-Coach introduced a number of replacement routes and at the same time became the network operator of the town.

In December 2020, Go-Coach launched the new E1 circular bus route in Edenbridge, giving the town a dedicated local route for the first time.

On 23 August 2021, Go-Coach introduced the 24-hour Fastrack branded AZ route between Dartford and Gravesend, serving the new Amazon LCY3 distribution centre in Dartford. On 2 April 2022, this route was transferred to Arriva Kent Thameside in April 2022 with the Amazon LCY3 also now served by the current Fastrack A route.

In December 2023, the company was sold to Derbyshire-based Hulleys of Baslow, but retained the Go-Coach branding, fleet and staff. Within a year however, Hulleys sold the operation back to previous owner and founder Austin Blackburn.

In August 2025, the company was rebranded to GoBus alongside its Swanley Garage open day.

== Garage, fleet and routes ==
GoBus run their routes from a single garage in Swanley, which runs a mixture of commercial and school routes as well as routes operated on behalf of Kent County Council with a total of 37 routes. GoBus operate a number of rural routes across Kent and as such, a number of their routes operate at very low frequencies with limited operating hours. GoBus are also the main bus operator in the town of Sevenoaks (since Arriva Southern Counties withdrew a number of their Sevenoaks routes in April 2019) and currently run and operate Sevenoaks bus station.

GoBus currently operate the following routes:

Route	Start	End	Operation
1	Sevenoaks	Westerham	Monday-Saturday
2	Sevenoaks	Swanley	Monday-Saturday
3	Sevenoaks	Orpington	Monday-Friday
5	Sevenoaks	Tonbridge	Monday-Saturday
6	Sevenoaks	Kemsing	Monday-Saturday
8	Sevenoaks	Circular route	Monday-Saturday
88.3	Swanley	Brands Hatch	Sundays only on race days
208	Henwood Green	East Peckham	Monday-Saturday
280	Royal Tunbridge Wells	Circular route	Monday-Saturday
283	Ferndale	Royal Tunbridge Wells	Monday-Saturday
289	Ramslye	Southborough	Weekdays only
401	Westerham	Tonbridge	Sundays only
429	Dartford	West Kingsdown	Monday-Saturday
477	Dartford	Swanley	Monday-Saturday
CB1	Bluewater Shopping Centre	Ebbsfleet International railway station	Monday-Sunday
D29	Dartford Schools	Swanley	Weekdays only during term time
D30	Dartford Schools	West Kingsdown	Weekdays only during term time
D77	Dartford Schools	Swanley	Weekdays only during term time
S2	Trinity School	Shoreham railway station	Weekdays only during term time
S3	Sevenoaks	Orpington	Weekdays only during term time
S4	Sevenoaks	Plaxtol	Weekdays only during term time
S5	Trinity School	Sevenoaks Weald	Weekdays only during term time
S6	Sevenoaks	Kemsing	Weekdays only during term time
S7	Trinity School	Westerham	Weekdays only during term time
S8	Trinity School	Westerham	Weekdays only during term time
S9	West Kingsdown	Knole Academy	Weekdays only during term time
S10	Swanley	Trinity School	Weekdays only during term time
S12	Crockenhill	Trinity School	Weekdays only during term time
S32	Knole Academy	Kemnal Technology College	Weekdays only during term time
S34	Knockholt railway station	Trinity School	Weekdays only during term time
S41	Trinity School	Edenbridge	Weekdays only during term time
T3	Badgers Mount	Weald of Kent Grammar School	Weekdays only during term time
TW1	Royal Tunbridge Wells	Kemsing	Weekdays only during term time
TW2	The Skinners' Kent Academy	Langton Green	Weekdays only during term time
TW3	Bennett Memorial Diocesan School	Swanley	Weekdays only during term time
TW4	Westerham	Royal Tunbridge Wells	Weekdays only during term time
TW6	Royal Tunbridge Wells	Badgers Mount	Weekdays only during term time

The fleet consists of Optare Solos, Optare Solo SRs, a Switch Metrocity, Optare Versas, an Optare Tempo, a Dennis Dart SLF bodied Marshall Capital C39, Alexander Dennis Enviro200 MMCs, Alexander Dennis Enviro400s, a Caetano e.City Gold, Peugeot Boxers, Fiat Ducatos and Rightech RB6s.

== Former routes ==
=== Route C2 ===
Route C2 used to run Monday to Saturday 05:30 to 23:30, and Sunday 06:30 to 22:30. It started at Gravesend bus station and terminated at Whitecliffe (Ebbsfleet Valley), and went via Ebbsfleet International railway station, Alkerden and Castle Hill. Route C2 was made as a temporary route to serve the new Castle Hill development before Go-Ahead London acquired Fastrack from Arriva Kent Thameside, and route C2 was renumbered E.

=== Route GC1 ===
Route GC1 used to run from Ebbsfleet International to Greenhithe railway station before being renumbered CB1 and extended up to Bluewater Shopping Centre.

== Go2 Sevenoaks ==
Since April 2020, GoBus have operated the Go2 demand responsive service in Sevenoaks in partnership with ViaVan. The service is designed to allow passengers to hail buses to their locations to remove the need for unnecessary bus operations.

=== Service history ===
==== April 2020 ====
The Go2 demand responsive service was introduced in April 2020 when Go-Coach suspended all of its fixed line bus routes in Sevenoaks and Edenbridge due to the COVID-19 pandemic.

The service initially ran Monday-Saturday only and covered the majority of the Sevenoaks District as well as extending north to Orpington and south to Tonbridge. It also served a number of hospitals outside of the main operating area including Tunbridge Wells Hospital in Pembury, Queen Mary's Hospital in Sidcup and Princess Royal Hospital in Locksbottom.

==== August 2020 ====
In August 2020, Go-Coach reinstated a number of their fixed line bus routes in Sevenoaks and Go2 continued to operate alongside these services. At the same time, the service was removed from Orpington and Tonbridge as well as the hospitals outside the main operating area.

==== January 2021 ====
In January 2021, Go-Coach again suspended a number of its Sevenoaks routes due to the COVID-19 pandemic and replaced them with Go2.

==== April 2021 ====
In April 2021, the Go2 service area was expanded to serve West Kingsdown, East Hill, Fairseat and Stansted.

A limited Sunday service was also introduced on the service covering Sevenoaks, Swanley and West Kingsdown.

At the same time, a number of Go-Coach fixed line bus routes in Sevenoaks were reintroduced and Go2 again operates alongside these.

==== January 2023 ====
In January 2023, a number of major changes were made to Go2 in response to a reduction in funding from Kent County Council. The service was scaled back to operate on weekdays and Saturdays from 06:00-19:00 only, with the Sunday service being withdrawn. In addition, the operating area was reduced, no longer serving Swanley, Edenbridge or West Kingsdown.

=== Operating area ===
As of January 2023, the key areas served by the Go2 service include: Sevenoaks Town Centre, Sevenoaks Weald, Ide Hill, Westerham, Sundridge, Brasted, Chipstead, Dunton Green, Knockholt, Halstead, Shoreham, Otford, Godden Green, Seal and Kemsing.

== Go2 Ebbsfleet Valley ==
Go2 has been operating in the Ebbsfleet Valley zone since 3 February 2025.

As of November 2026, Go2 Ebbsfleet Valley serves Ebbsfleet Valley, Ebbsfleet International railway station, Swanscombe, Greenhithe, Bluewater Shopping Centre, Darent Valley Hospital, Stone and Springhead.

The majority of the areas covered by Go2 Ebbsfleet Valley are also covered by the CB1 bus route.

GoBus acquired a number of Rightech RB6's which are produced by Wrightbus, under sub-brand Rightech, and are used primarily on route CB1 and Go2 Ebbsfleet Valley services, operating since June 2025. GoBus also has a fleet of Mellor Sigma 7s, Optare Solos and on the Go2 Ebbsfleet Valley routes, occasionally minivans are used, such as Peugeot Boxers, Renault Masters and Fiat Ducatos.
