= Knockholt =

Village in Kent, England

Coordinates: 51.31°N 0.105°E

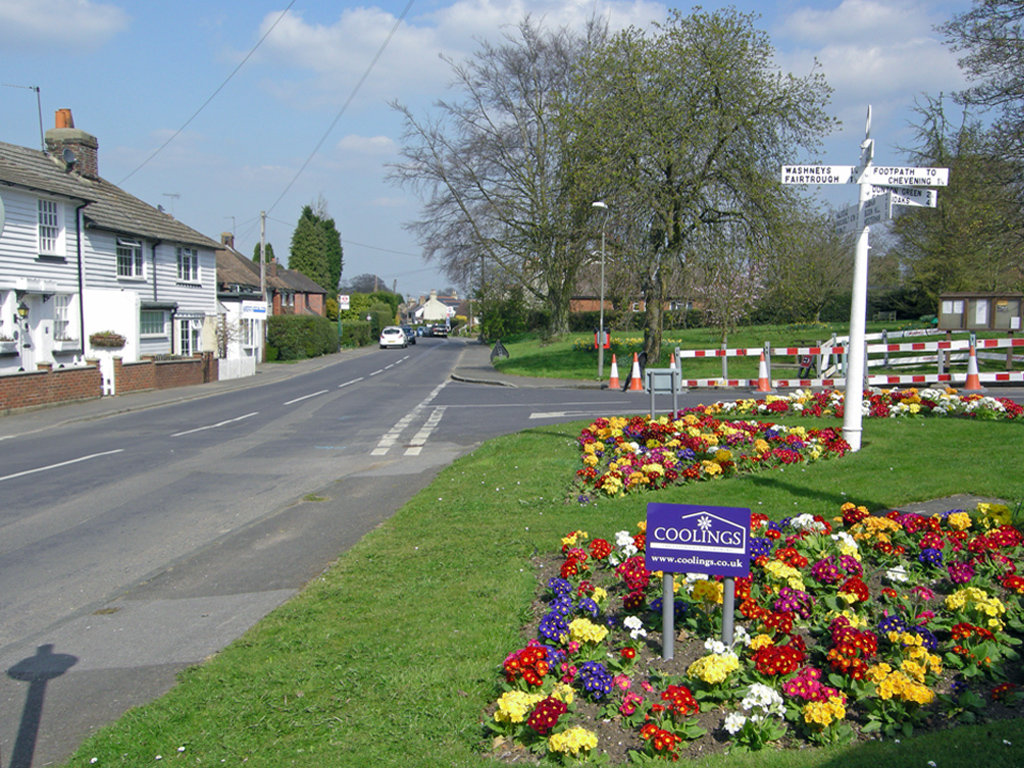
- Main Road, Knockholt

- Location within Kent
- Area: 2.63 sq mi (6.8 km^{2})
- Population: 1,222 (2011 Census)
  - Density: 465/sq mi (180/km^{2})
- OS grid reference: TQ467589
- Civil parish: Knockholt
- District: Sevenoaks
- Shire county: Kent
- Region: South East
- Country: England
- Sovereign state: United Kingdom
- Post town: SEVENOAKS
- Postcode district: TN14
- Dialling code: 01959
- Police: Kent
- Fire: Kent
- Ambulance: South East Coast
- UK Parliament: Sevenoaks

Knockholt is a village and civil parish in the Sevenoaks District of Kent. It is located 5 mi (8 km) north west of Sevenoaks and 5.7 mi (9.2 km) south of Orpington, and is adjacent to the Kent border with Greater London. In 2011 the parish had a population of 1222.

The village is mostly a ribbon development, surrounded by fields that are a part of the Green Belt. There is mixed arable farming. It is in a hilly, rural location, on the top of the dip slope of the North Downs, and has views over London. The village name, originally Nockholt, is one of many villages in England with a derivation from oak trees, most a strong departure from today's spelling of oak such as Aike.

== History ==
The village's name is derived from the Anglo-Saxon āc-holt meaning "oak wood", to which the final -n of the late Old English dative definite article "ðen" ("the") was accreted. The spelling with initial K- is a relatively recent one. Knockholt was included in Orpington Urban District in 1934. When Greater London was created in 1965, as part of Orpington UD, Knockholt was included in the new London Borough of Bromley. On 1 April 1969, following a concerted campaign by villagers it was removed from the Borough and returned to Kent, being included in Sevenoaks Rural District.

NOCKHOLT, a parish, in the [Poor Law] union of Bromley, hundred of Ruxley, lathe of Sutton-at-Hone, W. division of Kent, 5 miles (N. W.) from Seven-Oaks; containing 539 inhabitants. It consists of 1683 acres, of which 516 are in wood. The living [priest's benefice] is a perpetual curacy; net income, £102; patron, the [lay] impropriator of [the rectory of] Orpington: the tithes have been commuted [cut with chancel repairs apportioned] for £250, and the glebe comprises 3 acres. The church is a neat structure. There is a place of worship for Wesleyans. — A Topographical Dictionary of England, 1848

The area of the parish is virtually unchanged since first drawn in the late medieval period. When it temporarily merged into Orpington (in 1934) and fell under Bromley Rural District, it was 1,701 acres (688 ha), 18 more than in 1848.

The Ivy Farm Communications Centre at Knockholt Pound was the Radio Intercept Station for the non-Morse radio traffic, known as Fish, decoded by Bletchley Park during World War II. The importance of the station is noted in Paul Gannon's book.

There are two parts to the village, Knockholt, near the church and school and The Pound, near the Three Horseshoes pub, The Harrow pub, the village shop and garage.

St Katharine's Church, a Grade II*-listed building, is the Anglican parish church. Near Knockholt Pound is the London Road Evangelical Church, built in the late 19th century as a Methodist chapel. Its registration on behalf of the denomination was cancelled in July 1967, and in August 1968 it was re-registered for Evangelical use. Opposite the parish church is St Katharine's Church of England Primary School.

== Transport ==
=== Rail ===
The nearest National Rail station is Knockholt, though it is located 2 mi (3 km) away from the village, just over the London boundary and approximately halfway between Chelsfield and Halstead.

=== Buses ===
Knockholt is served by London Buses routes R5 and R10 which provide connections to Orpington, Cudham and Halstead. Go-Coach also operate weekday services via Knockholt Pound on route 3 that provides connections to Locksbottom, Orpington, Dunton Green and Sevenoaks. Knockholt Pound is also within the operating area of Go-Coach's demand responsive go2 Sevenoaks bus that allows passengers to order a shared bus via an app or phone number to destinations in the region including Westerham, Otford and Ightham. The company also operates various school services that pass through Knockholt Pound: the T3 to schools in Sevenoaks and Tonbridge; TW6 to schools in Tunbridge Wells; and the S3 and S34 to Trinity School, Sevenoaks.

== Local activities ==
Knockholt residents host a village carnival every two years, the most recent being in July 2024, and a fireworks night every year, late October to early November. The carnival originated with the Festival of Britain in 1951, and has taken place in many years since, with particular reinvigoration in the 1980s and 2010s. Funds raised through these and other events go to national and local charities.

Another regular event in the village is the Knockstock music festival, which started in July 2013 and has taken place on the village recreation ground or at the Three Horseshoes pub.

Knockholt Amateur Theatrical Society produce one play and pantomime every year. This charitable society was formed in 1945. Kytens is the local youth amateur theatrical group linked to KATS above.

There are many other groups including Bowls, Cricket, Tennis, Horse Riding, Horticulture, Christian Fellowship. This is a popular area for horse riders, walkers, ramblers and cyclists, due to its beauty.

Knockholt Cricket Club completed the 2009 season unbeaten in the Kent County Village League (KCVL) Division 3, which was believed to be a KCVL first.

== See also ==
- List of places of worship in Sevenoaks (district)
- Listed buildings in Knockholt
