= St Margaret's Church, Halstead =

St Margaret, Halstead
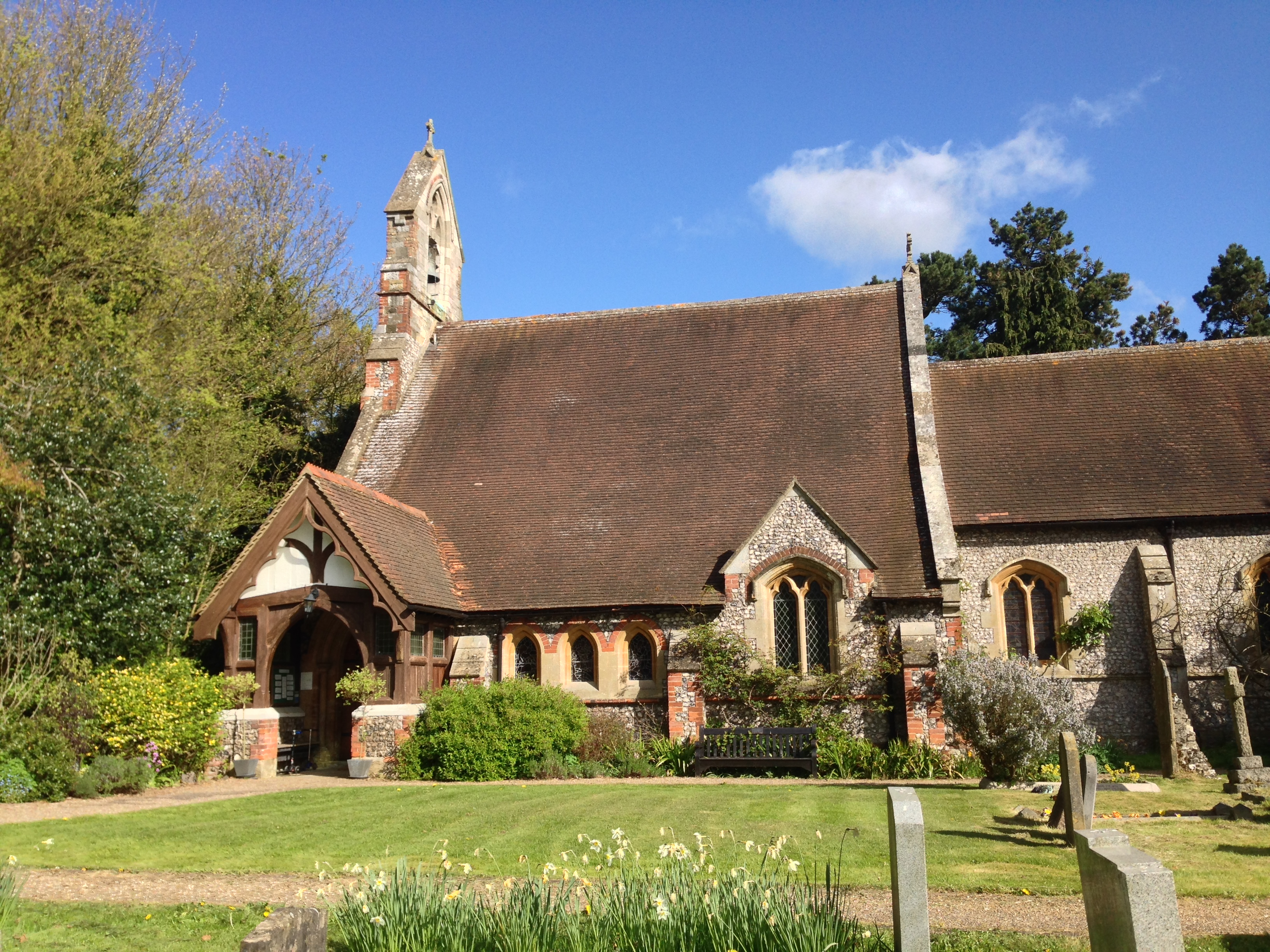
- St Margaret's Church, Halstead
- St Margaret, Halstead
- 51°20′6″N 0°7′39″E
- Denomination: Church of England
- Churchmanship: Broad Church
- Website: knockholtandhalsteadchurches.org

History
- Dedication: Margaret the Virgin

Administration
- Province: Canterbury
- Diocese: Rochester
- Archdeaconry: Kent
- Deanery: Sevenoaks
- Parish: Halstead

Clergy
- Priest: Rev. Tim Edwards

St Margaret's Church is an Anglican parish church in the village of Halstead and the Sevenoaks deanery, although the church also serves the village of Badgers Mount. St Katharine's and St Margaret's came together in 1983 as a United Benefice under one parish priest. The pattern of services reflects the fact that it is two parishes working closely together.

== History and architecture ==
St Margaret's is built across the road from the site of the original demolished medieval church, the only remaining sections of which include the monuments held inside the current church; these monuments date back to the mid-15th century. The chancel was built in 1855 by R. C. Hussey, and is described by architectural historian John Newman as having "flintwork [that] is laboriously galleted with flint flakes", and was originally built as a burial chapel. The nave and the lean-to south aisle are combined under a single roof built by W. M. Teulon between 1880 and 1881. The south-west porch is timber-framed, and is "picturesquely" grouped with the south-east gabled window and a large west bell-gable. The north aisle and vestry were built by St Aubyn and Wadling in 1897, and the outer north aisle was completed in 1992. The interior is unified, boasting "three-bay arcades with circular piers, bold capitals and deeply moulded red brick arches."

The organ case was possibly provided by Teulon, and includes a canted front. The stained glass windows in the west of the nave were designed by Casolani and brought in from the old church in 1867. Those in the east chancel depict Christ in Majesty, and were designed in the 1880s by Hardman & Co. The north aisle's windows were built by Morris & Co. in 1909, using designs by Edward Burne-Jones; those in the south aisle were designed by Marguerite Douglas-Thomson in 1950.

Monuments present inside the church include a dedication to William Burys, who died in 1444 and is depicted in armour in 26 inch high brass; William Petley, who died in 1528 and is depicted with his wife in a comparatively small brass; and Sir James Ashe, who died in 1733, his dedication presented in a white marble tablet, depicting cherubs at the top and bottom, and signed by Jonathan Barker - this is the latter's only known work. There is also a grave of a crusader at this church.

== See also ==
- List of places of worship in Sevenoaks District
- St Katharine's Church, Knockholt

== Sources ==
- Newman, John (2012) [1969]. Kent: West and the Weald. The Buildings of England. Yale University Press. ISBN 978-0-30-018509-6.
