= Hutty =

Hutty is a surname. Notable people with the surname include:

- Abbie Hutty (born 1986/1987), British mechanical engineer
- Alfred Hutty (1877–1954), American painter
