= St Katharine's Church, Knockholt =

Church in Kent, England

St Katharine, Knockholt
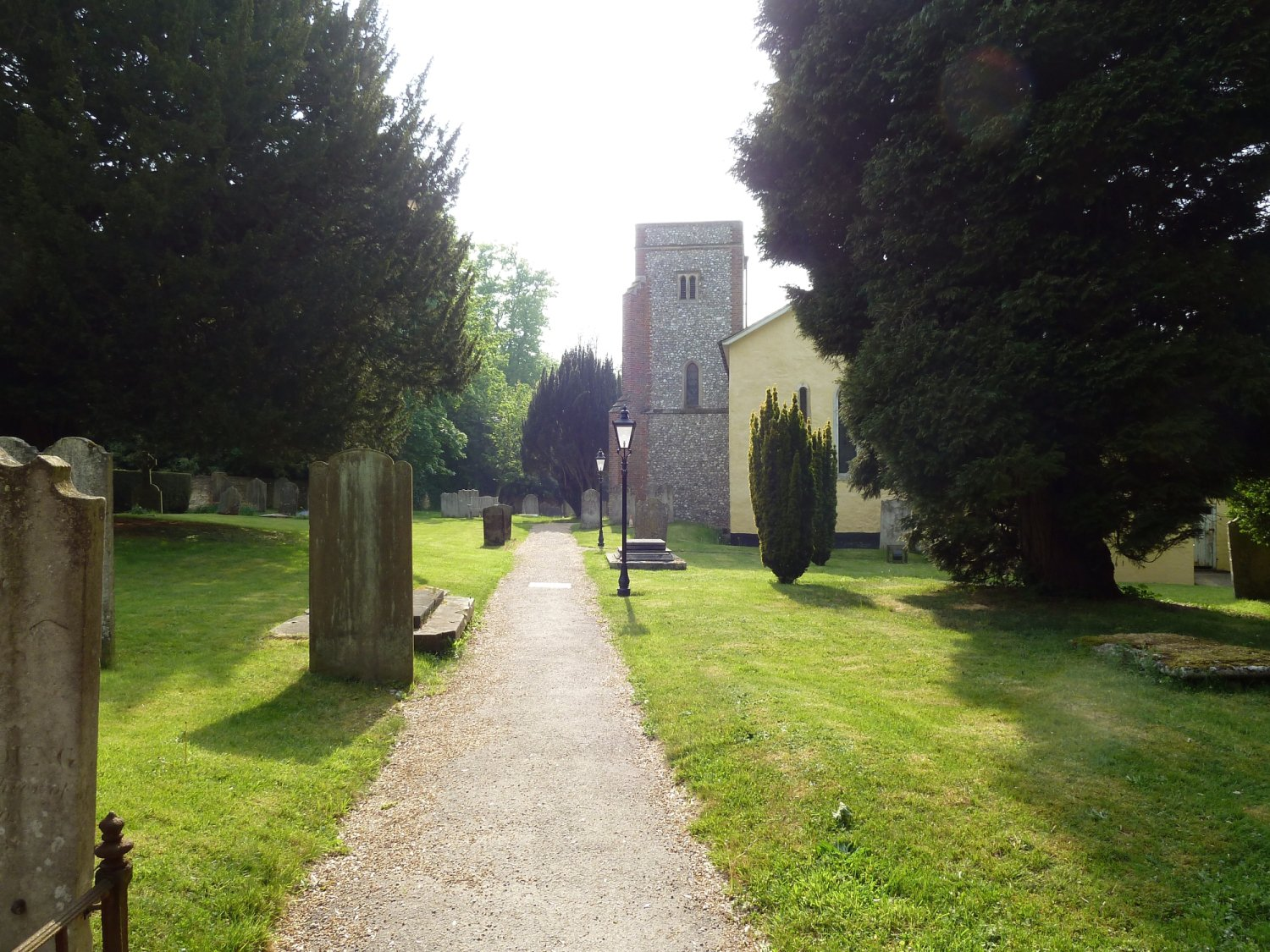
- St Katharine's Church, Knockholt
- St Katharine, Knockholt
- 51°18′37″N 0°6′16″E
- Denomination: Church of England
- Churchmanship: Broad Church
- Website: knockholtandhalsteadchurches.org

History
- Dedication: Katharine the Virgin

Administration
- Province: Canterbury
- Diocese: Rochester
- Archdeaconry: Kent
- Deanery: Sevenoaks
- Parish: Knockholt

Clergy
- Priest: Rev. Tim Edwards

St Katharine's Church is an Anglican parish church in the village of Knockholt and the Sevenoaks deanery. St Katharine's and St Margaret's came together in 1983 as a United Benefice under one parish priest. The pattern of services reflects the fact that it is two parishes working closely together. The church has been designated a Grade B listed building by English Heritage.

== History and architecture ==
The church, and the emergence of Knockholt as an independent parish, can be dated from a document of 1350, rediscovered in Reigate library in 1849. It records how Ralph Scot of Chelsfield bought land in Ocolte and moved to his newly built hall there in the times of Henry III, before 1272.

Ralph Scot and his people ‘wandering to Chevening and elsewhere in all directions from their Parish Church of Orpington, and because through the distance of the place from the said Parish Church many perils of souls befell’ petitioned for a new church. Under the leadership of Ralph Scot, Harvey Goldsmith and others a chapel was built in a clearing in the woodlands 'out of their own goods'. A house for a chaplain, tithe barn, and glebe land for his support, were provided to be possessed in perpetual alms. The rector of Orpington objected to his loss of dignity and income, and appealed to Rome. Such appeals abroad on anything which could be considered ecclesiastical matters were a constant source of trouble and expense for many centuries.

In spite of this, the building was consecrated and dedicated to St Katharine the Virgin on 9 May 1281. The rector of Orpington had the right of choosing the chaplain, who became a 'perpetual curate', with the same rights as a rector. Much of the original building probably still exists in the simple rectangular walls, with no separate chancel. In a map of 1596 a spire was indicated, and a squat tower and broached steeple is shown in a drawing of 1801. In 1840 the steeple was replaced by a clock tower. If the early drawing is accurate the present tower is further west than the original, where a porch was shown, although there are no obvious traces of the change to be seen now. If this occurred it could have been during repairs after a fire in 1858, or in 1863. A significant enlargement was made when the north aisle was added in 1881. In March 1944, during the Blitz, a bomb fell on the church's rectory, severely damaging the building and killing the unfortunate rector, Charles Hobley. There is a memorial tablet to him in the church. In 1998 glass screens were put in so that an area at the west end of this aisle could be used separately.

== See also ==
- List of places of worship in Sevenoaks District
- St Margaret's Church, Halstead
