= Listed buildings in Halstead, Kent =

Civil Parish in Kent, England

Halstead is a village and civil parish in the Sevenoaks District of Kent, England. It contains 15 grade II listed buildings that are recorded in the National Heritage List for England.

This list is based on the information retrieved online from Historic England.

== Key ==
Grade	Criteria
I	Buildings that are of exceptional interest
II*	Particularly important buildings of more than special interest
II	Buildings that are of special interest

== Listing ==
Name	Grade	Location	Type	Completed (Note: The date given is the date used by Historic England as significant for the initial building or that of an important part in the structure's description.)	Date designated	Grid ref. (Note: The grid reference is based on the British national grid reference system, sometimes known as OSGB36, used by the Ordnance Survey.) Geo-coordinates	Notes	Entry number (Note: The "List Entry Number" is a unique number assigned to each listed building and scheduled monument by Historic England.)	Image	Wikidata
Coach House and Stable Building at Halstead Place School	II	Church Road			10 September 1954	TQ4829961543; 51°20′01″N 0°07′39″E		1258329	Upload Photo	Q26549577
Front Garden Wall to North and North West of Village House	II	Church Road			16 January 1975	TQ4873461191; 51°19′49″N 0°08′01″E		1362405	Upload Photo	Q26644297
The Coach House with Attached Wall Village House Cottages	II	Church Road			16 January 1975	TQ4876361161; 51°19′48″N 0°08′02″E		1071956	Upload Photo	Q26327333
The Old Rectory	II	Church Road			16 January 1975	TQ4849361457; 51°19′58″N 0°07′49″E		1362404	Upload Photo	Q26644296
Village House	II	Church Road			16 January 1975	TQ4872061158; 51°19′48″N 0°08′00″E		1258314	Upload Photo	Q26549562
Widmore Farmhouse	II	Church Road			10 September 1954	TQ4873461232; 51°19′51″N 0°08′01″E		1258243	Upload Photo	Q26549498
Church of St Mary Margaret	II	Church Street			10 September 1954	TQ4836961716; 51°20′07″N 0°07′43″E		1258279	Church of St Mary Margaret More images	Q7594103
Crown Cottages the Rose and Crown Public House	II	1-3, Otford Lane			16 January 1975	TQ4893261082; 51°19′46″N 0°08′11″E		1071957	Upload Photo	Q26327334
Stable Buildings to North West of Rose and Crown Public House and Wall Abutting	II	Otford Lane			16 January 1975	TQ4891561089; 51°19′46″N 0°08′10″E		1071958	Upload Photo	Q26327335
Colgates Former Colgates Farm House Now A Property Separate from the Farm	II	Shoreham Lane, Colgates			16 January 1975	TQ4944561524; 51°19′59″N 0°08′38″E		1273463	Upload Photo	Q26563208
44-48, Station Road	II	44-48, Station Road			16 January 1975	TQ4888961344; 51°19′54″N 0°08′09″E		1258337	Upload Photo	Q26549584
Back Garden Wall of the Hall to East and North Boundaries of Grounds	II	Station Road			16 January 1975	TQ4880661223; 51°19′50″N 0°08′04″E		1258339	Upload Photo	Q26549586
Front Garden Wall of the Hall Along Church Road from Corner of Station Road	II	Station Road			16 January 1975	TQ4884161170; 51°19′49″N 0°08′06″E		1273464	Upload Photo	Q26563209
The Hall	II	Station Road			10 September 1954	TQ4882861180; 51°19′49″N 0°08′05″E		1258338	Upload Photo	Q26549585

== See also ==
- Grade I listed buildings in Kent
- Grade II* listed buildings in Kent

== Sources ==
- Newman, John (2012) [1969], Kent: West and the Weald, The Buildings of England, New Haven and London: Yale University Press, ISBN 978-0-300-18509-6
