= Listed buildings in Knockholt =

Civil Parish in Kent, England

Knockholt is a village and civil parish in the Sevenoaks District of Kent, England. It contains one grade II* and 17 grade II listed buildings that are recorded in the National Heritage List for England.

This list is based on the information retrieved online from Historic England.

== Key ==
Grade	Criteria
I	Buildings that are of exceptional interest
II*	Particularly important buildings of more than special interest
II	Buildings that are of special interest

== Listing ==
Name	Grade	Location	Type	Completed (Note: The date given is the date used by Historic England as significant for the initial building or that of an important part in the structure's description.)	Date designated	Grid ref. (Note: The grid reference is based on the British national grid reference system, sometimes known as OSGB36, used by the Ordnance Survey.) Geo-coordinates	Notes	Entry number (Note: The "List Entry Number" is a unique number assigned to each listed building and scheduled monument by Historic England.)	Image	Wikidata
Burlings Cottage	II	Burlings Lane, Burlings			16 January 1975	TQ4574358845; 51°18′36″N 0°05′23″E		1258572	Upload Photo	Q26549789
Franklow	II	Burlings Lane, Burlings			16 January 1975	TQ4575458858; 51°18′37″N 0°05′23″E		1273292	Upload Photo	Q26563049
Outhouse and Garden Wall to North of Burlings Cottage	II	Burlings Lane, Burlings			16 January 1975	TQ4573258855; 51°18′37″N 0°05′22″E		1258573	Upload Photo	Q26549790
The Grange	II	Chevening Lane, The Grange, Knockholt Pound			22 October 1971	TQ4816459405; 51°18′52″N 0°07′28″E		1273385	Upload Photo	Q26563136
Oast House and Drying Shed to North of Portlands and Attached Walls to South and East of Oast	II	Cudham Lane South, Portlands			16 January 1975	TQ4533558239; 51°18′17″N 0°05′01″E		1258571	Upload Photo	Q26549788
Portlands	II	Cudham Lane South, Portlands			22 October 1971	TQ4535858219; 51°18′16″N 0°05′02″E		1273308	Upload Photo	Q26563063
Portlands Cottage	II	Cudham Lane South, Portlands			22 October 1971	TQ4531758267; 51°18′18″N 0°05′00″E		1273384	Upload Photo	Q26563135
Stable Buildings to North East of Former Drying Shed on Portlands Estate	II	Cudham Lane South, Portlands			22 October 1971	TQ4533258272; 51°18′18″N 0°05′01″E		1258716	Upload Photo	Q26549922
South Lodge	II	Deerleap Lane, Knockholt Pound			16 January 1975	TQ4792860517; 51°19′28″N 0°07′18″E		1258574	Upload Photo	Q26549791
Castle House	II	Knockholt Main Road			16 January 1975	TQ4825259822; 51°19′06″N 0°07′34″E		1258575	Upload Photo	Q26549792
Chine Farmhouse	II	Knockholt Main Road, Chine Farm			2 September 1971	TQ4758659217; 51°18′47″N 0°06′58″E		1258577	Upload Photo	Q26549794
Church of St Katherine	II*	Knockholt Main Road			22 October 1971	TQ4678258929; 51°18′38″N 0°06′16″E		1273386	Church of St Katherine More images	Q7593885
Ivy Farmhouse (now Part of A Des Establishment)	II	Knockholt Main Road			16 January 1975	TQ4797859412; 51°18′52″N 0°07′19″E		1258578	Upload Photo	Q26549795
Rocks Forge	II	Knockholt Main Road			16 January 1975	TQ4673558771; 51°18′33″N 0°06′14″E		1258576	Upload Photo	Q26549793
War Memorial	II	Main Road			11 December 2003	TQ4679358903; 51°18′37″N 0°06′17″E		1390792	War Memorial More images	Q26670170
Letts Green Farmhouse	II	New Year's Lane, Lett's Green			22 October 1971	TQ4595959300; 51°18′51″N 0°05′34″E		1258752	Upload Photo	Q26549957
Barn to South West of Park Farmhouse	II	Rushmore Hill			16 January 1975	TQ4806860527; 51°19′28″N 0°07′25″E		1258580	Upload Photo	Q26549797
Park Farmhouse	II	Rushmore Hill			16 January 1975	TQ4810460548; 51°19′29″N 0°07′27″E		1258579	Upload Photo	Q26549796

== See also ==
- Grade I listed buildings in Kent
- Grade II* listed buildings in Kent

== Sources ==
- Newman, John (2012) [1969], Kent: West and the Weald, The Buildings of England, New Haven and London: Yale University Press, ISBN 978-0-300-18509-6
