= Snake Pass =

Hill pass in the Derbyshire section of the Peak District

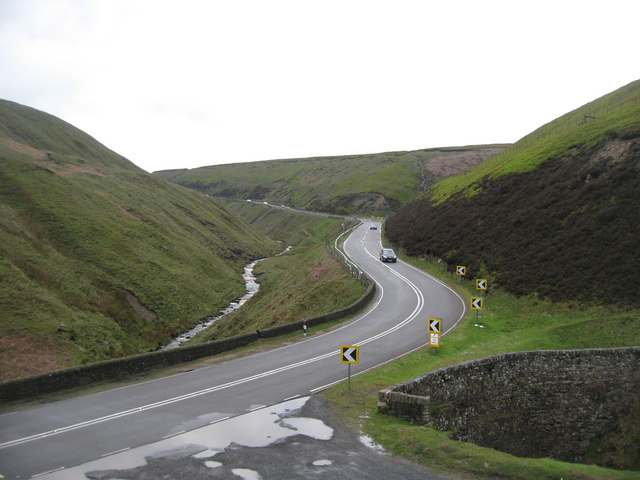
- Approaching the summit from the Snake Pass Inn

- Location within Derbyshire
- Elevation: 1,680 feet (510 m)
- Traversed by: A57

Third Approach
- Location: High Peak Estate, Peak District, Derbyshire, England
- Range: Pennines
- Coordinates: 53°25′58″N 1°52′08″W

Snake Pass is a hill pass in the Derbyshire section of the Peak District, crossing the Pennines between Glossop and the Ladybower Reservoir at Ashopton. The pass carries the A57 road between Manchester and Sheffield, but it is no longer the main signposted route between those two cities, with traffic instead directed through the Woodhead Pass to the north.

Like several other roads that cross the Pennines, Snake Pass has a poor accident record compared with roads in the UK generally, although more favourable compared with other roads in the area. It is often closed in winter because of snow, and has seen several longer-term closures owing to subsidence following heavy rain. The road remains a popular route for tourists and motorcyclists, however, and sections have been used for semi-professional cycling races such as the Tour of Britain.

== Route and location ==
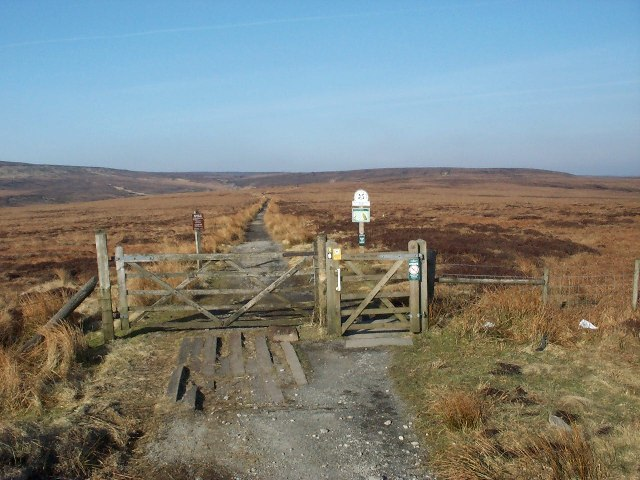
The Pennine Way crosses Snake Pass at its summit.

Snake Pass runs through the National Trust's High Peak Estate, and lies within the High Peak borough of Derbyshire; much of it falls within the Hope Woodlands parish, the remainder being within the Charlesworth parish. It is part of the shortest route by road from Manchester to Sheffield.

The pass starts east of Glossop and climbs to the Pennines watershed between the moorland plateaux of Kinder Scout and Bleaklow to a high point of 1,680 feet (510 m) above sea level, where it crosses the Pennine Way. After this, it passes the former Snake Inn public house and descends through forest to the Ladybower Reservoir at Ashopton.

The name of the road matches its winding route, but actually derives from the emblem of the Snake Inn, one of the few buildings on the high stretch of road. In turn, the pub's name and sign were derived from the serpent on the Cavendish arms of William Cavendish, 6th Duke of Devonshire. In the early 21st century, the inn was renamed the Snake Pass Inn, such that the name of the inn referred to the road that referred to itself. The inn closed in October 2019.

== History ==
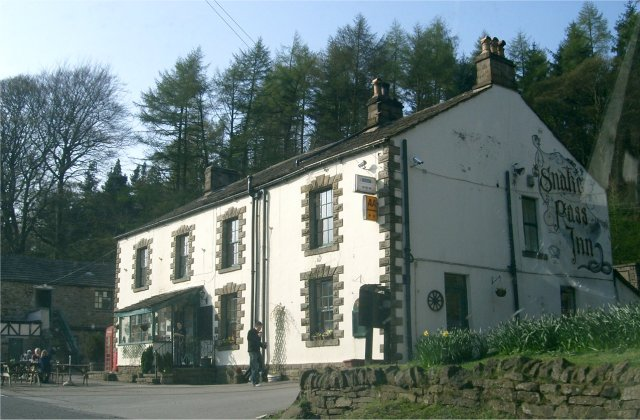
The Snake Pass Inn was originally called the Snake Inn, but is now named after the pass itself, which in turn was named after the pub.

An ancient road between Glossop and Ashopton was the Doctor's Gate, which follows the Shelf Brook between Shelf Moor and Coldharbour Moor. It is marked on some maps as a Roman road, though this is disputed. The route is now popular with walkers and mountain bikers. In 1932, an Iron Age axe thought to be more than 2,000 years old was found near the site of this road.

Sheffield and Glossop Road Act 1818
- Act of Parliament
- Parliament of the United Kingdom
- Long title: An Act for making and maintaining a Road from the Town of Sheffield, in the County of York, to join the Marple Bridge Road in the Parish of Glossop, in the County of Derby, with a Branch to Mortimer's Road, in the Parish of Hathersage, in the said County of Derby.
- Citation: 58 Geo. 3. c. xxxv
- Introduced by: Parliament of the United Kingdom (Commons)

Dates
- Royal assent: 8 May 1818

Other legislation
- Repealed by: Sheffield and Glossop Road Act 1825

Status: Repealed

Text of statute as originally enacted

Sheffield and Glossop Road Act 1825
- Act of Parliament
- Parliament of the United Kingdom
- Long title: An Act for more effectually repairing and improving the Road from Sheffield, in the County of York, to the Marple Bridge Road, in the Parish of Glossop, in the County of Derby, and the Branch to Mortimer's Road, in the Parish of Hathersage, in the said County of Derby.
- Citation: 6 Geo. 4. c. xcviii

Dates
- Royal assent: 20 May 1825

Other legislation
- Repeals/revokes: Sheffield and Glossop Road Act 1818
- Repealed by: Sheffield and Glossop Turnpike Road Act 1851

Status: Repealed

Text of statute as originally enacted

Sheffield and Glossop Turnpike Road Act 1851
- Act of Parliament
- Parliament of the United Kingdom
- Long title: An Act for repairing the Road from Sheffield in the County of York to the Marple Bridge Road in the Parish of Glossop in the County of Derby, and the Branch to Mortimer's Road in the Parish of Hathersage in the said County of Derby.
- Citation: 14 & 15 Vict. c. cxxxiii

Dates
- Royal assent: 7 August 1851

Other legislation
- Repeals/revokes: Sheffield and Glossop Road Act 1825

The current road further south was designed as a toll road to improve communications east of Glossop, which was expanding as an industrial town. It was originally called the Sheffield to Glossop Turnpike and run by a turnpike trust, the Sheffield and Glossop Turnpike Trust, and it shortened the route by 15 miles. An act of Parliament to build the road, the Sheffield and Glossop Road Act 1818 (58 Geo. 3. c. xxxv) was passed, (Note: 58 Geo. 3. c. xxxv, subsequently repealed and replaced in 1825 by 6 Geo. 4. c. xcviii, itself replaced in 1851 by 14 & 15 Vict. c. cxxxiii, An Act for repairing the road from Sheffield in the county of York to the Marple Bridge Road in the parish of Glossop in the county of Derby, and the branch to Mortimer's Road in the parish of Hathersage in the said county of Derby. The turnpike trust expired in 1875.) and construction was financed by the Duke of Norfolk (Lord of the Manor of Sheffield and Glossop) and the Duke of Devonshire (owner of the Ashop Valley).

William Fairbank, a surveyor from Sheffield, designed the road, with construction being undertaken by John Macadam. The road opened on 23 August 1821, having cost £18,625 to build (equivalent to £1.8 million in 2025). Upon opening, it was the highest turnpike road in England. The road was immediately popular and increased toll collections of traffic heading to Glossop. However, improvements in the rival Sheffield and Chapel-en-le-Frith Turnpike, with Winnats Pass being bypassed in 1819 by a new route via Mam Tor, removed much of the advantage of the Snake Pass route, which also suffered from a greater susceptibility to snow, leading to less than anticipated income. Subsequent acts of Parliament extended the turnpike trust; the Sheffield and Glossop Road Act 1825 (6 Geo. 4. c. xcviii) and the Sheffield and Glossop Turnpike Road Act 1851 (14 & 15 Vict. c. cxxxiii). Tolls were abolished on the road in June 1870, in return for the local highway boards taking over maintenance responsibilities. The Local Government Act 1888 transferred responsibility for maintenance to the new county councils: in the case of the Snake Pass section of the turnpike road, this was Derbyshire County Council.

The eastern end of the pass is by the River Derwent. The river is bridged by the Ashopton Viaduct, built as part of the Ladybower Reservoir project between 1935 and 1945. In 1946 the road was designated part of the A57 road.

Although Snake Pass is still the shortest route between Manchester and Sheffield, the more northerly Woodhead Pass, which is less steep and at a lower altitude, is now the primary road link between the two cities. Unlike Snake Pass, the Woodhead route is a trunk road. Traffic levels on both passes remained similar until the 1980s, Despite Sheffield and Manchester being among the largest UK cities by population, there is no direct motorway link between the two. The M67 was originally proposed to be a Manchester to Sheffield motorway, but only a small section bypassing Denton and Hyde was actually built. The Woodhead Tunnel, which carried a Sheffield to Manchester railway line, was closed in 1981, and it was proposed to use it as part of a motorway link but linking the cities by road would have meant constructing many costly tunnels and viaducts across the Peak District. Consequently, the plans were shelved, but reports in December 2014 announced a revival of the ambition for a road tunnel to avoid the passes.

In 1979, the Department of Transport considered closing the road with traffic to be diverted to use the A628.

The road remains popular with drivers. A 2008 survey by Caterham Cars rated Snake Pass the best driving road in the UK. The following year, it was listed as one of the best roads for driving in Britain by Auto Trader magazine, who described it as "offering unparalleled views over Manchester".

== Safety ==
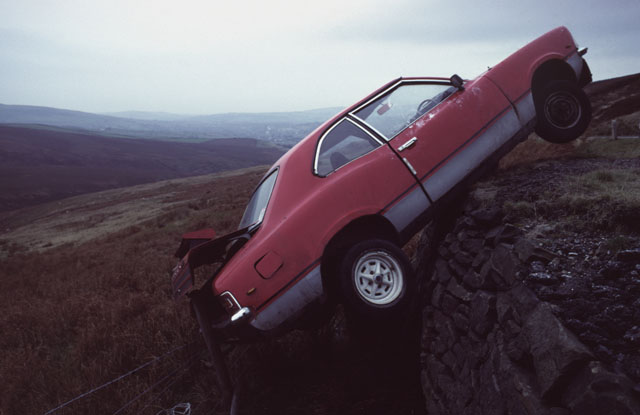
An abandoned car left hanging off the edge of Snake Pass, 1983

Snake Pass has several dangerous bends and blind summits. Like many roads in the North of England passing through similar terrain, Snake Pass has a poor safety record in comparison to other roads in the United Kingdom but it is not as dangerous as other roads bisecting hilly terrain in this part of England. It was not among the top ten in lists of the most dangerous roads published by the Road Safety Foundation for EuroRAP in June 2007 and in July 2010, despite nine of the top ten being in Northern England.

In 2012, Derbyshire Police announced a campaign to monitor motorcyclists using the pass, who are particularly at risk of being involved in a fatal accident.

Incidents of people being overtaken by bad weather in Snake Pass, and in particular the deaths of three walkers in 1964, led to the organisation of Peak District Mountain Rescue.

== Weather ==
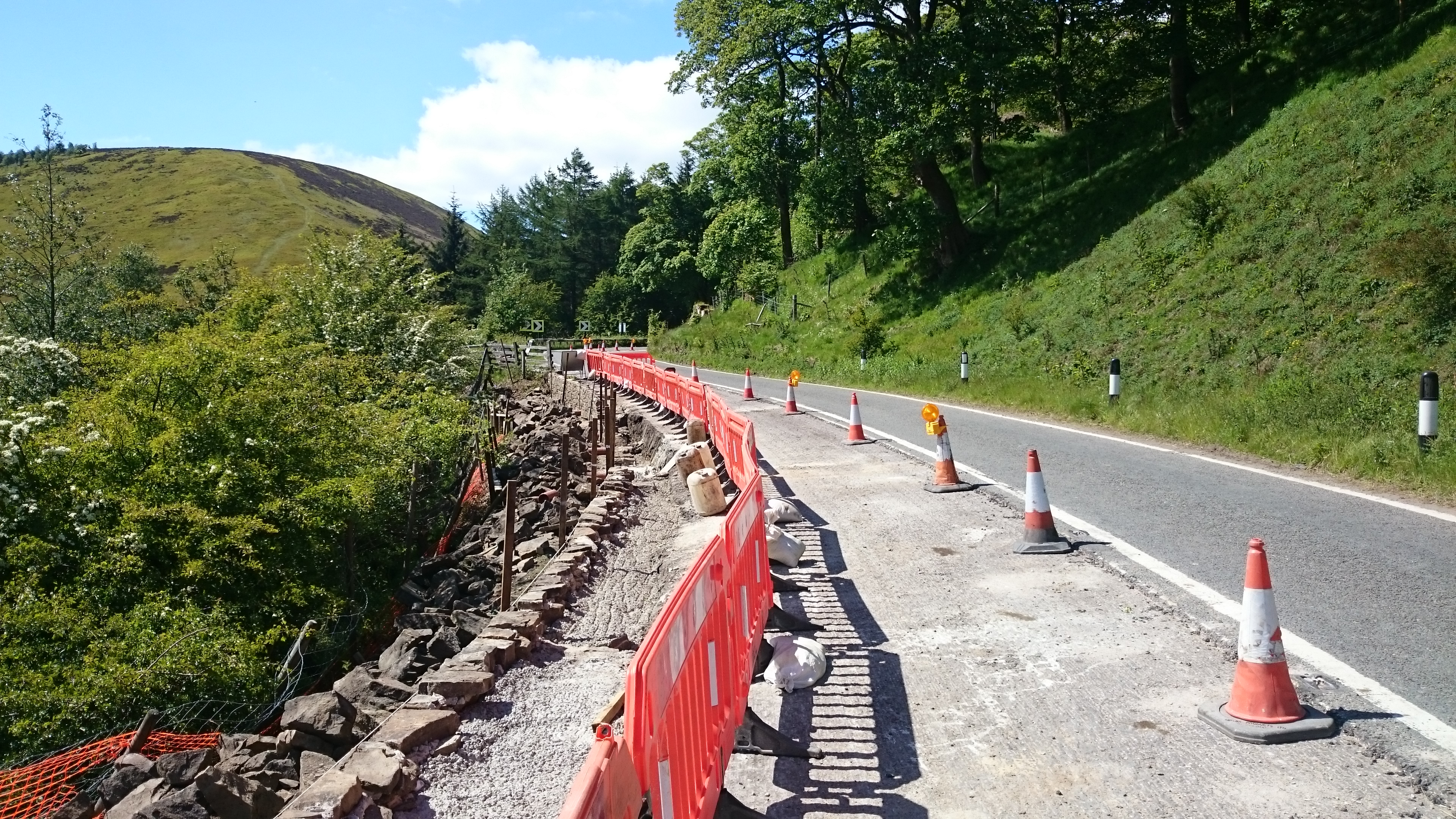
Repair work to one of the highway's retaining walls, June 2015

In winter the road is often the first of the routes between Sheffield and Manchester to be closed following snow in the area. In bad storms the entire road over the summit, including marker poles, has been buried in snow. Derbyshire County Council, who are the highway authority for Snake Pass, class the route as a priority for gritting which is pre-treated ahead of icy weather. The local borough council, High Peak Borough Council, who are not responsible for gritting, have stated that they would prefer streets in towns and villages were treated instead, as they believe that roads such as Snake Pass will be closed anyway.

In 1924, Derbyshire County Council spent £2,000 (equivalent to £105,000 in 2025) installing underground telegraph wire cables beneath the road, as the above-ground installations were continually broken and disrupted following snowstorms. The British winter of 2010–11 was the coldest for decades and the road was closed on numerous occasions.

== Subsidence ==
Snake Pass has also been closed for longer periods owing to subsidence in the local area following rain. In January 1932, the road was closed after 200 tonnes of debris fell on it during a heavy rainstorm, covering the surface in as much as 4 feet (1.2 m) in places. In January 2008, a landslip at Cowms Moor following heavy rain caused the road to be closed to all traffic between Ladybower and Glossop, although access was still available to local premises and businesses including the Snake Pass Inn. A subsequent investigation by the British Geological Survey showed the road has had a history of subsidence-related long-term closures dating back to the 1930s, including a 1970s project that attempted to strengthen the layer below the tarmac with local rock fill. The road reopened in February, but with temporary traffic lights at the point of the slip restricting traffic to one direction at a time. In 2012, the road had to be closed several times for resurfacing and strengthening.

In February 2022, Snake Pass was closed to motor vehicles after Storm Eunice caused heavy rain leading to subsidence. Inspectors examining the road found three slumps in a single mile-long section. Two weeks later, the closure was extended to bicycles, prompting protests; it was reopened on 31 March with weight restrictions and traffic light sections. That August, the council announced it would be partially closed again to investigate collapses, while the road would be examined with a drilling rig.

In May 2023, the road was closed again after Storm Franklin brought heavy rainfall to the region, causing landslips of up to 2 metres (6 ft 7 in). The closure extended from the turnoff at Fairholmes to the summit.

Due to the ongoing costs in repairing the road, Derbyshire County Council warned in February 2025 that it may not be able to continue maintenance, risking the road's future, and recent Lidar images show the ongoing challenges the road faces from subsidence.

== Cycling and hiking ==
Snake Pass is a popular route for cyclists. A 1902 report on leisure cycling in the Lancashire Evening Post described the eastward journey from the summit to Ashopton as "nine miles unbroken freewheeling" and the scenery as "magnificent". The road is one of only a few road climbs in the UK that are comparable in length and average gradient (approximately 7 per cent for around 3.2 miles (5.1 km) when starting in Glossop) to those used in continental cycle racing. The road had been part of an 82-mile (132 km) "Tour of the Peak" race, involving climbing the pass twice, and has frequently featured in the Tour of Britain along with another nearby favourite, Holme Moss.

Cycling Time Trials sanctioned hill climbs are regularly promoted on this course by local club Glossop Kinder Velo. The record for completing the course is 11 minutes 51 seconds, which was set by Tejvan Pettinger in 2014.

The annual Four Inns Walk has traditionally used parts of the route.

== Bus route ==
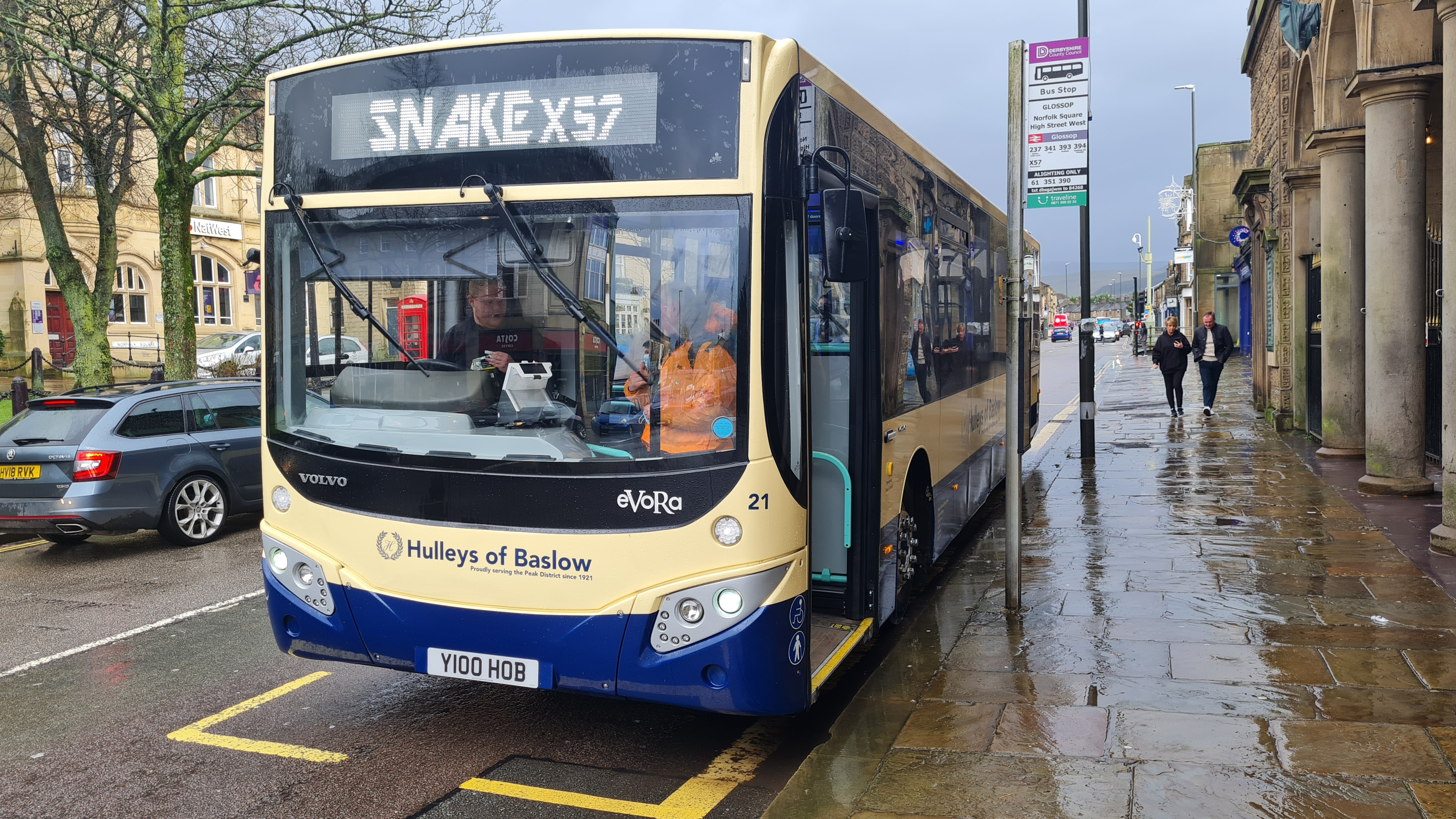
Hulleys of Baslow MCV Evora in Glossop on the final day of the X57 Snake service in January 2022

Between October 2020 and January 2022, Hulleys of Baslow operated the X57 Snake bus route, which ran between Sheffield and Manchester via the Snake Pass. The service was withdrawn on 9 January 2022 because low ridership made the route unsustainable.

== Cultural references ==
Snake Pass has been referred to several times by music groups. The track "The Snake" by Sheffield band The Human League, from their 2001 album Secrets, is about the road. The Squarepusher album Selection Sixteen features a track entitled "Snake Pass", described by Rolling Stone as a "monomaniacal thump".

Comic character John Shuttleworth has performed a song called "Incident on Snake Pass" about the perils of Snake Pass, relating to an accident he claimed to have had, driving a Ford Anglia on the road.
