= X57 Snake =

Bus route in England

X57
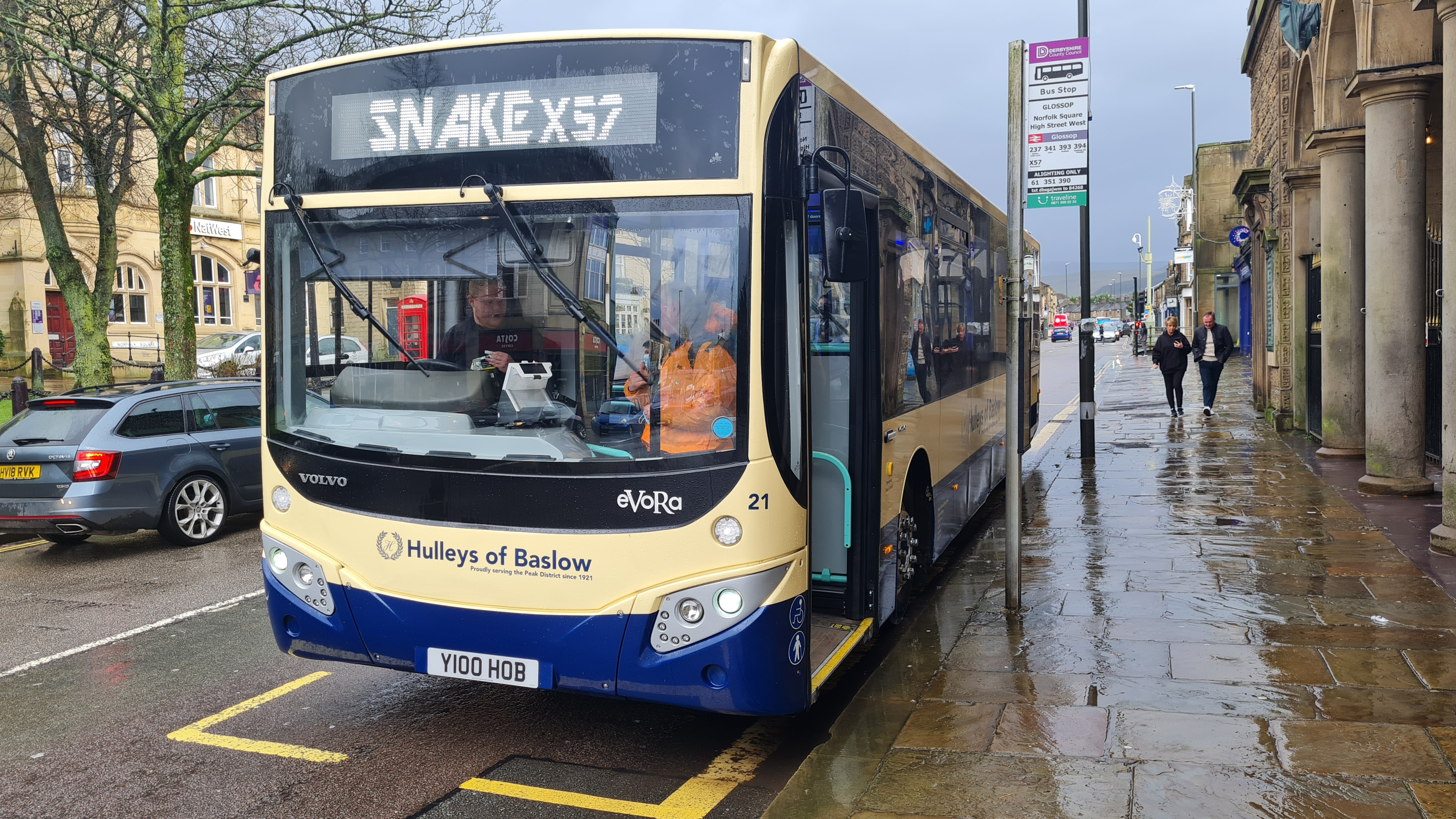
- Hulleys of Baslow MCV Evora in Glossop on the final day of the X57 on 9 January 2022

Overview
- Operator: Hulleys of Baslow
- Status: Withdrawn
- Began service: 25 October 2020
- Ended service: 9 January 2022

Route
- Landmarks served: Peak District; Ladybower Reservoir
- Start: Sheffield
- Via: Crosspool; Snake Pass; Glossop
- End: Manchester
- Length: 40 miles (64 km)

The X57, often referred to as the Snake, was a bus route that ran between Manchester and Sheffield via Glossop.

== History ==
The route was introduced on 25 October 2020 by Hulleys of Baslow. In May 2021, the route was extended from Manchester Chorlton Street to Manchester Airport. In September 2021, Hulley's announced plans to extend the route to Macclesfield, however the planned extension was cancelled due to driver shortages.

The service was eventually withdrawn due to low passenger numbers. The final day of operation of the X57 was 9 January 2022. Hulleys' 257, which ran parallel to the X57 between Sheffield and Bakewell via the Ladybower Reservoir, was increased to an hourly frequency with a £1 flat fare as a partial replacement of the route.

== Route ==
The bus ran on the A57 road through the Snake Pass. The bus called at the following stops:

- Sheffield Interchange
- Crosspool
- Ladybower Inn (for Ladybower Reservoir)
- Bamford railway station (Sundays only)
- Fairholmes Visitor Centre (for Ladybower Reservoir, Sundays only)
- Snake Inn
- Glossop
- Hollingworth
- Manchester Chorlton Street
- Manchester Oxford Road
- University of Manchester Students' Union
- Manchester Royal Infirmary
- Fallowfield Owens Park
- Manchester Airport

The X57 was supplemented by the X56 which operated between Glossop and Manchester only on the same route. This route was withdrawn in 2021.
