= Hulleys =

Bus operator in Derbyshire, England

Hulleys by High Peak

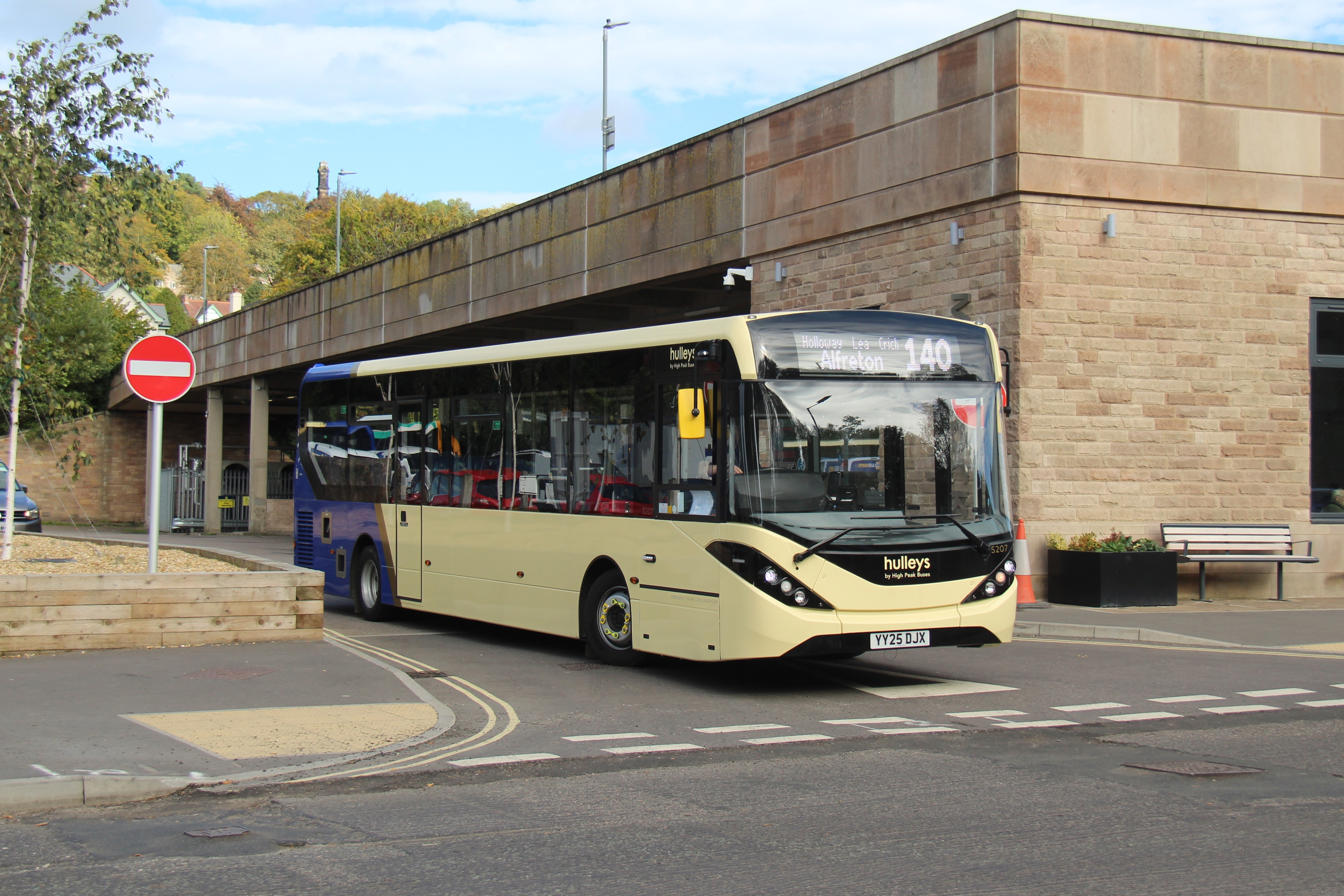
- Hulleys by High Peak bus in Matlock, 2025
- Founded: 29 April 1921; 105 years ago
- Headquarters: Dove Holes, Derbyshire, England
- Service area: Derbyshire
- Service type: Bus services
- Routes: 7 (Note: As at October 2025.)
- Destinations: Alfreton, Crich, Matlock
- Fleet: 4
- Website: highpeakbuses.com/hulleys/

Hulleys by High Peak is a bus company based in Dove Holes, Derbyshire, England. Founded as Henry Hulley & Sons Ltd in 1921, the original company remained independent and family-owned until closure in March 2025, by which time it was known as Hulleys of Baslow. The Hulleys brand name was subsequently purchased by High Peak Buses, a subsidiary of Centrebus and Wellglade, which relaunched Hulleys-branded services on 6 October 2025.

== History ==
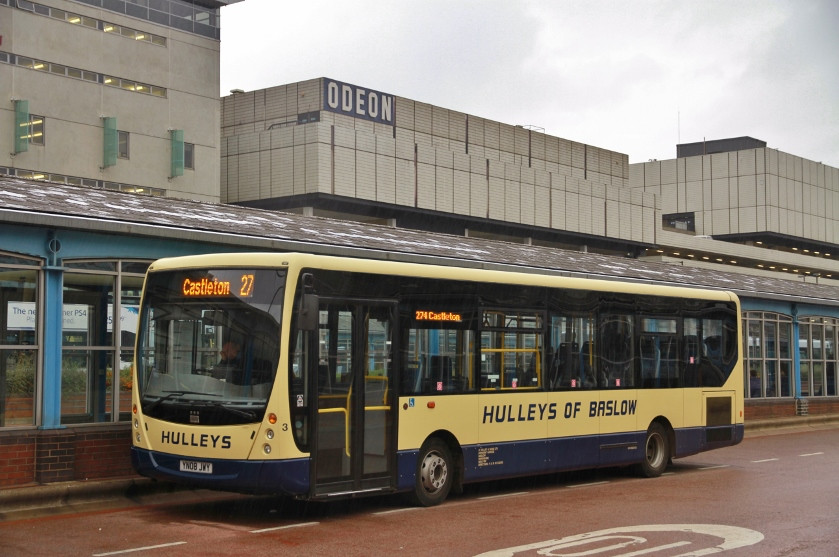
Plaxton Centro-bodied MAN 18.240 at Sheffield Interchange, October 2016

The origins of Hulleys can be traced back to 1914, when Henry Hulley purchased a Ford Model T and commenced running a taxi service based from Baslow. On 29 April 1921, he began operating a service from Baslow to Chesterfield, via Cutthorpe. In 1925, a service from Bakewell to Youlgreave commenced. By 1934, further growth through the acquisition of several small independent operators had seen the fleet expand to seven buses and coaches, with excursions operated to York, Skegness, Southport and Blackpool. A formal company named Henry Hulley & Sons Ltd was eventually founded on 25 January 1938.

Founder Henry Hulley died in 1955, with the business passing his children and a coach being purchased in his memory. Hulleys' longstanding Baslow to Chesterfield service was withdrawn on 25 July 1970, due to falling passenger numbers, with routes serving Grindleford station, operated since 1939 following the takeover of Maurice Kenyon of Grindleford, also abandoned. On 7 August 1978, Jack, Ben and Nina Hulley, the children of Henry Hulley, sold Hulleys of Baslow to fellow independent coach operator JH Woolliscroft & Sons, which rebranded Hulleys as Silver Service and moved operations to their Darley Dale depot.

On 10 March 2020, ownership of Hulleys was transferred to company driver Alf Crofts. The company's coaching operations were withdrawn during 2020, due to the financial impact of the COVID-19 pandemic. A year later in April 2021, Hulleys celebrated its centenary with the launch of the X57 Snake service between Sheffield and Manchester, via the Snake Pass, the purchase of a new vehicle and the painting of existing vehicles in heritage liveries.

=== Demise ===
In late 2023, Hulleys of Baslow purchased Kent-based independent operator Go-Coach of Swanley from owner Austin Blackburn. The branding of Go-Coach's fleet and routes remained separate from the main Hulleys operation and, on 28 February 2025, after over a year of ownership, Hulleys had sold Go-Coach back to Blackburn through a management buyout.

Following a period of poor performance on four Derbyshire County Council tendered bus services, resulting in the company being stripped of their contracts once retendering had taken place, it was announced on 24 March 2025 that, after 103 years of service, Hulleys of Baslow was to cease operations on 26 March; an insolvency practitioner being appointed to help close down the company. On 25 March, a day earlier than planned, Hulleys ceased operations in the early afternoon with vehicles called back to the Baslow depot; a stand-off between numerous parties, including drivers who had lost wages and such payments as a result of the company's closure, took place at the Hulleys depot, with police being called after access to the depot was blocked by recovery vehicles.

Derbyshire County Council subsequently awarded local operators tenders to replace services that had been operated by Hulleys; these included Andrews of Tideswell, Ashbourne Community Transport and Stagecoach Yorkshire. It was announced initially that High Peak Buses were to replace commercial service 170, running between Chesterfield and Bakewell; however, High Peak pulled out of the replacement scheme after Stagecoach Yorkshire had also been approved to run a competing commercial service, which differed only by not serving Chesterfield Royal Hospital and Holymoorside.

Henry Hulley & Sons Ltd's bus operating licence was revoked by the Traffic Commissioner for North West England on 14 August 2025, with Alf Crofts being fined £6,650 and disqualified from holding an operating licence for two years for the failure of Hulleys without reasonable excuse.

== High Peak Buses revival ==
In early September 2025 it emerged that High Peak Buses was reviving the Hulleys of Baslow name for the takeover of the Crich services contracts. These started on 6 October, using a mixture of new and second hand Alexander Dennis Enviro200 MMCs in blue and cream livery with Hulleys by High Peak fleetnames.

== Services ==
At the time of ceasing operations in March 2025, Hulleys operated a wide network of services, centred around linking Peak District towns and villages with Sheffield, Chesterfield and Bakewell, as well as networks serving Ashbourne, Glossop, Matlock and surrounding areas.

In October 2022, the firm took over operation of routes 48 and 49, running from Clay Cross to Brampton and Bolsover or Clowne respectively, from fellow independent TM Travel. Upon launch, some afternoon services on the 48 were extended to run to Wigley from Brampton's Morrisons supermarket.

The company previously operated the X57 Snake service, which operated between Sheffield and Manchester via the mountainous A57 Snake Pass. Launched on 25 October 2020, and initially operated 10 return trips on Mondays to Saturdays, the service was soon withdrawn on 9 January 2022 due to low passenger numbers making the X57 financially unviable.

Hulleys previously operated a number of summer weekend only express services which launched in March 2020 and linking Sheffield, Chesterfield and Bakewell to such attractions as Alton Towers and Carsington Water.

== Fleet ==
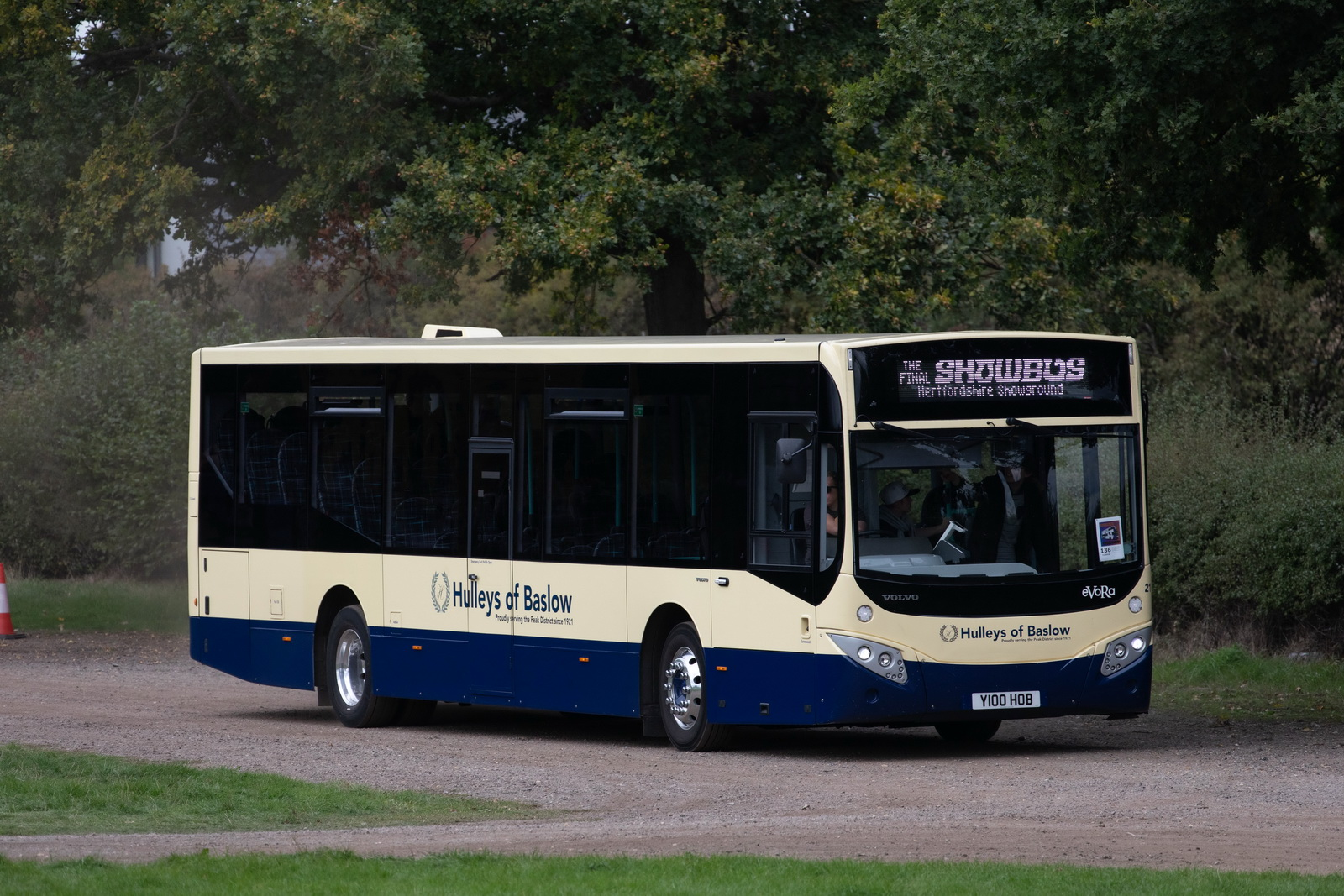
An MCV Evora-bodied Volvo B8RLE attending Showbus 2022 in Hertfordshire

At the time of ceasing operations in March 2025, Hulleys of Baslow held an licence authorising the operation of 19 buses, most of which were single-deckers. Among vehicles operated include an MCV Evora-bodied Volvo B8RLE, purchased during the company's centenary in 2021, as the first new Hulleys vehicle in ten years.

A fleet of four new Enviro200 MMCs were purchased by High Peak in October 2025 for the relaunch of the Hulleys brand.

== See also ==
- List of bus operators of the United Kingdom
