= Halstead, Kent =

Village in Kent, England

Coordinates: 51°20′N 0°8′E

Halstead
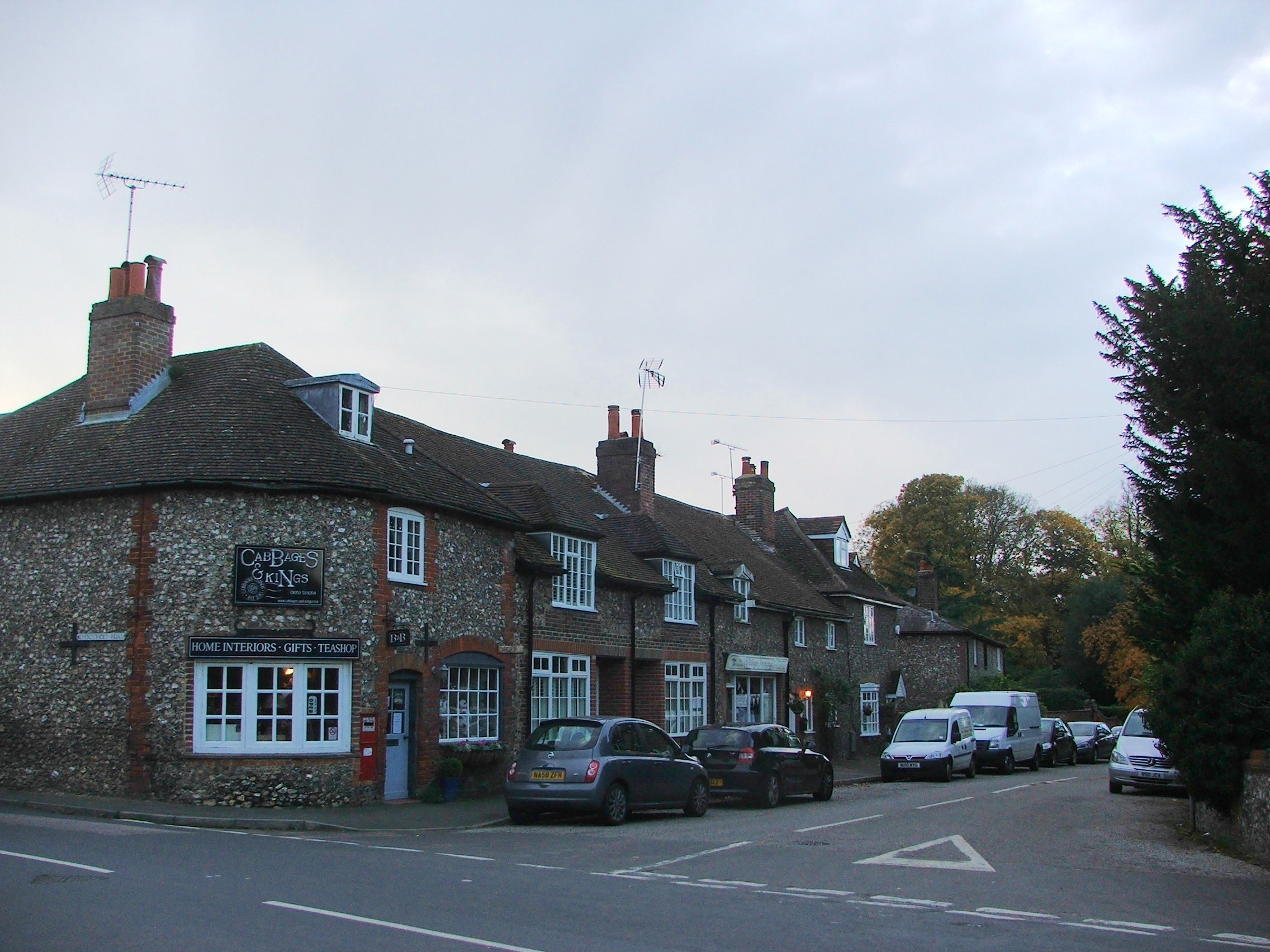
- Church Road

- Location within Kent
- Population: 1,607 (2011 Census)
- District: Sevenoaks
- Shire county: Kent
- Region: South East
- Country: England
- Sovereign state: United Kingdom
- Post town: Sevenoaks
- Postcode district: TN14
- Police: Kent
- Fire: Kent
- Ambulance: South East Coast
- UK Parliament: Sevenoaks

Halstead is a village and civil parish in the Sevenoaks District of Kent, England. It is located 4.7 miles south east of Orpington and 6.1 miles north west of Sevenoaks, adjacent to the Kent border with Greater London. The population of the civil parish at the 2011 census was 1,607.

== History ==
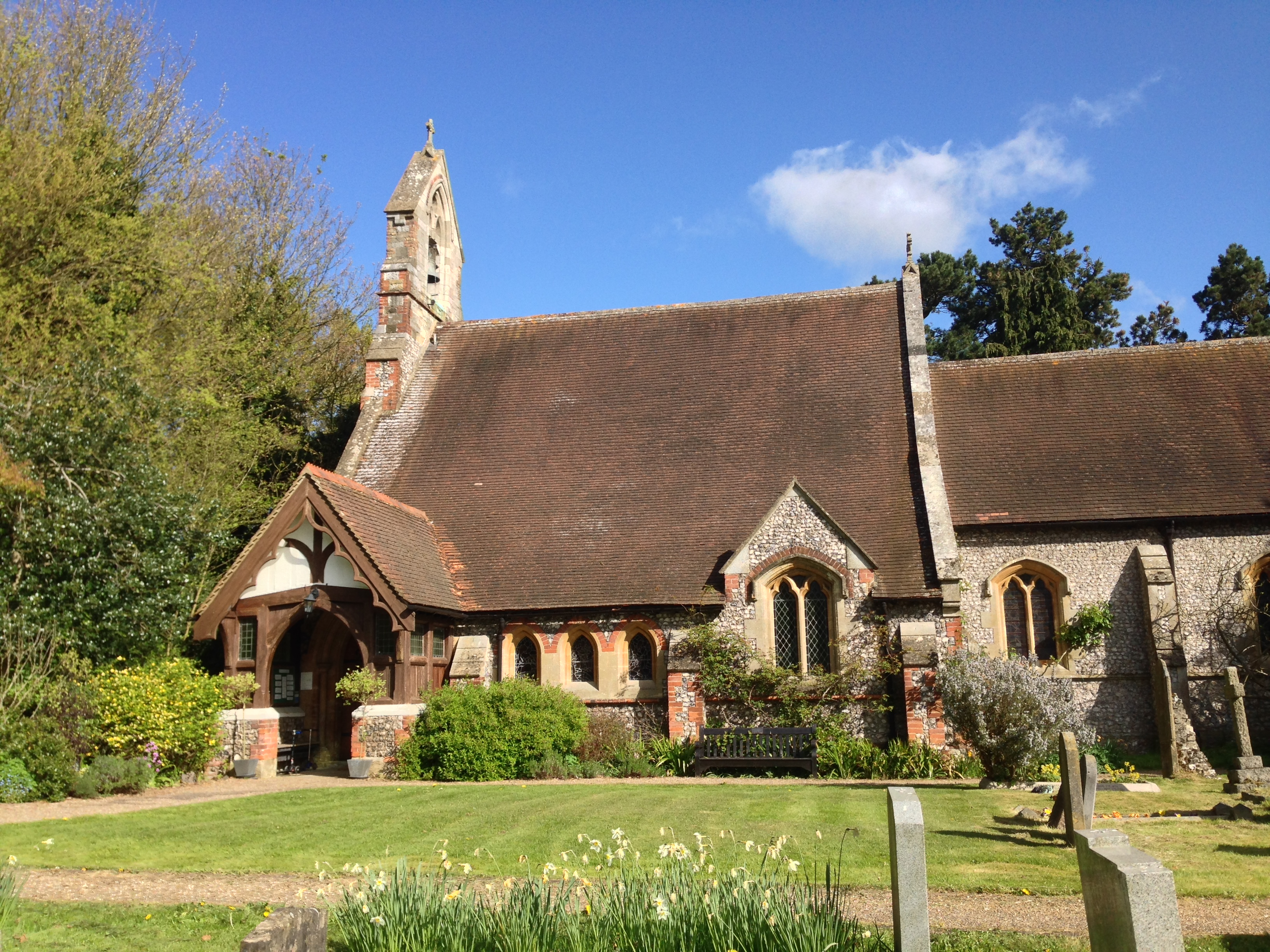
St Margaret's Church

The name Halstead is derived from the Old English hald (refuge, shelter) and stede (site, place), meaning 'safe place' or 'place of refuge'. The parish church is dedicated to St Margaret. Halstead Community Primary School is located in the village.

Botanist and photographer Anna Atkins lived since 1841 to her death at Halstead Place, where she is buried, Her father the gentleman and scientist John George Children also died at Halstead Place. Author Edith Nesbit spent some of her adolescence in Halstead during the 1870s and her book The Railway Children is thought to be based on her time living in a house, Halstead Hall, whose garden is about a mile and a half from the railway line.

The parish is adjacent to Fort Halstead, a government defence research centre that is thought to have developed Britain's first atomic bomb.

== Sports Clubs ==
- Chelsfield Football club
- Halstead Cricket Club
- Halstead Netball club
- Orpington & District Amateur Boxing Club

== Transport ==
=== Rail ===
The nearest National Rail station to Halstead is Knockholt, located 1.4 miles away.

=== Buses ===
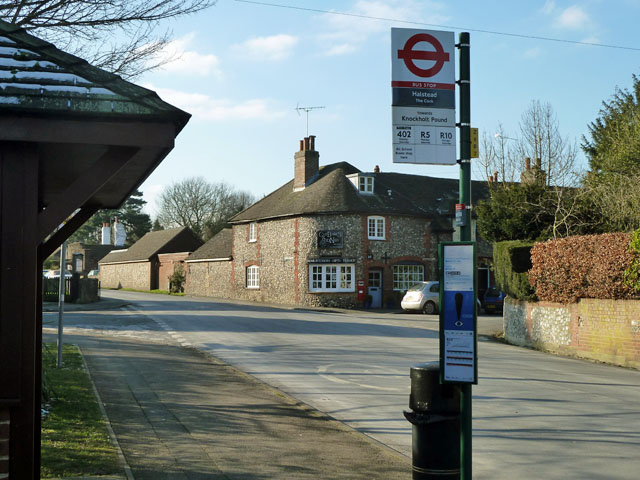
Halstead bus stop

Halstead is served by London Buses routes R5 and R10 which provide connections to Orpington, Cudham and Knockholt.

== See also ==
- Listed buildings in Halstead, Kent
- Halstead, a town in Essex
