= Knole Academy =

Location
- Bradbourne Vale Road; Sevenoaks, Kent; England; 51°17′13″N 0°11′2″E

Information
- Type: Academy
- Established: 2010
- Local authority: Kent
- Trust: Knole Academy Trust UID 3664
- Department for Education URN: 136128 Tables
- Ofsted: Reports
- Headteacher: David Collins
- Gender: Mixed
- Age: 11 to 19
- Enrolment: 1162
- Sponsors: Gordon Phillips (Chairman of Glen Care), Sevenoaks School and Kent County Council (KCC).
- Website: www.knoleacademy.org

Knole Academy is a secondary school in Sevenoaks, Kent, England, with a grammar band and Sixth-Form. Knole opened in September 2010 as a result of the amalgamation of the Wildernesse secondary school in Sevenoaks, Kent and Bradbourne School (for girls) As part of Knole Academy Trust (UID 3664), the school transitioned to Aletheia Academies Trust in 2024.

== Previous schools ==
The Wildernesse School was a single sex high school for boys aged eleven to nineteen. It had Specialist School status for Mathematics and Computing. Other than the English motto taken from a letter to Sir Philip Sidney from his father, the school had a Latin motto: Non Nobis Solum (English: "Not for ourselves alone"). The school closed in July 2010, becoming part of the Knole Academy at the start of the autumn term in September 2010.

The Bradbourne School was a girls' 11–18, high school with a 6th form that hosted about 860 students. It closed in 2010. Bradbourne School had been renamed in 1974, having previously been Sevenoaks School for Girls, and before that, Hatton School. Its original buildings included the house, Maywood, built in 1874, which had previously been called Hatton House and been the home of Lady Fanny Finch-Hatton. Maywood is now the Sevenoaks Adult Education Centre.

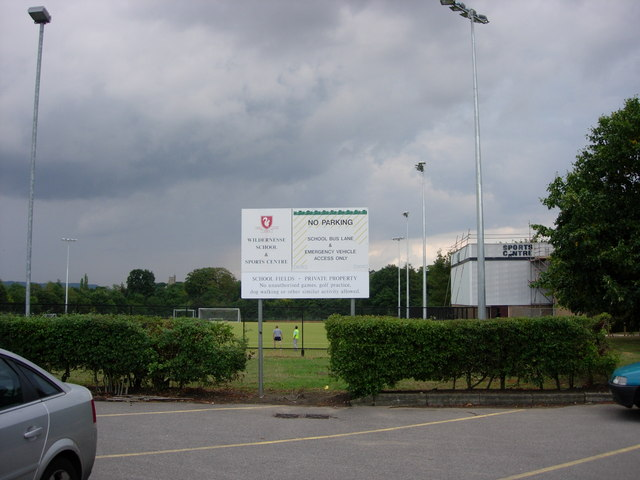
Former Wildernesse School

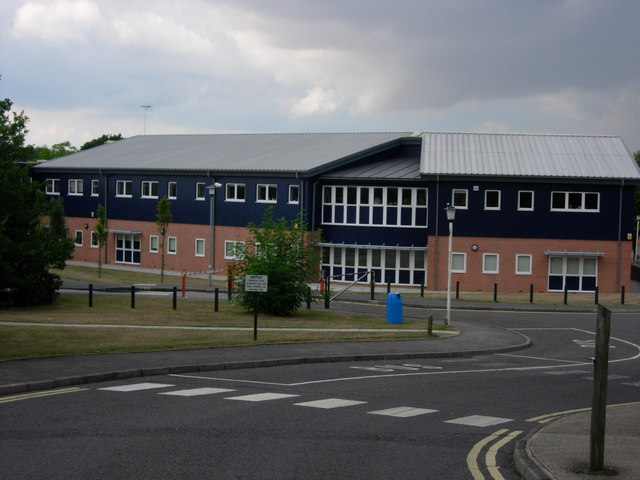
Former Bradbourne School

== The site ==
The former Bradbourne site was selected for the new academy. This had to be a sensitive development as the site lies right at the edge of the metropolitan Green Belt. The location of the new building was selected to respect the overall use pattern of the site, and to enable construction whilst the existing buildings remained in use. The site had an existing building footprint of 4,912 m^{2} (52,870 sq ft) to which would be added – 2,761 m^{2} (29,720 sq ft) which makes up 8% of the total site area. There is 19,968 m^{2} (214,930 sq ft) of general recreational space with 22,145 m^{2} (238,370 sq ft) of sports pitches and viewing areas. There is 30,684 m^{2} (330,280 sq ft) of landscaping and 13,164 m^{2} (141,700 sq ft) of parking and service roadways.

To the north of the three-storey new building are two sports halls and the music teaching accommodation. To the south set at an angle that follows the contours of the site are the specialist classrooms, toilets and office space. Art has the top floor, science has the middle floor and construction and technology on the ground floor. General classrooms are in the existing building with a capacity of 1550.

The sites of the previous schools were used during the construction of the new Academy buildings which weren't completed until 2015. On merger, not all of the students from Wildernesse moved over immediately; the merger of students was only completed in September 2011. Since then, the site at Knole East (Wildernesse) has been used to site Trinity Free School, Sevenoaks and Weald of Kent Grammar School Annex. Before becoming an academy, Bradbourne School was designated as a specialist Arts College. This specialisation has carried over to Knole Academy, which emphasises an arts curriculum alongside other subjects. One of the academy’s sponsors is Sevenoaks School.

== Academics ==
As of 2024, the school's most recent full inspection by Ofsted was in 2017, with an outcome of Good. There was a short inspection in 2022 which confirmed the judgement of Good. The Knole Academy curriculum covers GCSEs and the IB Diploma Programme.

== Notable alumni ==
- Archie Yates, actor
- Anton du Beke, choreographer
- Jerome Flynn, actor and singer
- Murray Lachlan Young, poet, playwright, author and screenwriter
- John Salako, footballer
- Matthew Wilson, garden designer and broadcaster
- Paul Hartnoll, EDM musician

== Transport ==
There has been controversy over the overcrowding of school transport.

== Headteacher's salary ==
In 2019 the government has requested Knole Academy to justify the high salary previously received by its former headteacher, though the school has stated that it no longer offers six-figure salaries to any staff members.
