= Weald of Kent Grammar School =

Location
- Tudeley Lane; Tonbridge, Kent, TN9 2JP; England; 51°11′02″N 0°16′52″E

Information
- Type: Grammar school; Academy
- Motto: Academic Excellence, Personal Success
- Established: 1982, previously Tonbridge Technical High School for Girls founded 1947
- Department for Education URN: 136455 Tables
- Ofsted: Reports
- Head teacher: Richard Booth
- Staff: 109 (including administration, premises, student services and technical support)
- Gender: Girls (code sixth form)
- Age: 11 to 18
- Enrolment: 1,400
- Houses: Metis, Bia, Themis, Gaia, Aletheia
- Colours: Maroon and Gold
- Website: www.wealdofkent.kent.sch.uk
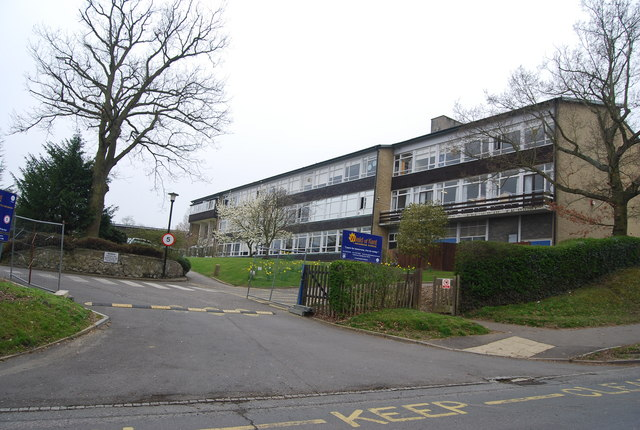

Weald of Kent Grammar School is a selective or grammar school with academy status in Tonbridge, Kent, England, for girls aged 11–18 and boys aged 16–18. Selection is by the Kent test.

The school holds specialisms in languages and science.

On 15 October 2015, the government gave permission for the school to create an "annexe" in Sevenoaks. Before this time no new grammar schools were permitted so Sevenoaks which was non selective, was not permitted to create one. This judgement was controversial.

== Buildings ==
Weald of Kent is a fairly modern school with many additional extensions. In 2003, a canteen operated by independent catering contractors was built called 'La Wokerie' - a pun derived from the school's name "WOK". In 2006, a new English and Humanities Block was built, referred to by most students as 'the new building' It offered larger classrooms, some of which have false walls between two of them which can open up to create one large room. A new Arts and Drama suite was completed in early 2008. In the beginning of 2014, another two storey building was built for Maths and Examinations, and an extension to 'La Wokerie' was added by converting the adjacent classroom into a diner style restaurant with extra seating and a salad bar. Following the conversion of the old gymnasium into the 'Sixth Form Hub', accompanying the 'Sixth Form Café', the school opened a new sports hall towards the end of 2016. The opening was attended by British gymnast Max Whitlock.

== Sevenoaks annexe ==
On 15 October 2015, Nicky Morgan, the Education Secretary, announced that government would give permission for the school to create an "annexe" in Sevenoaks, which had no grammar schools. The site for the 'annexe' is that of the former Wildernesse School on Seal Hollow Road, preparations started on the site soon after planning permission was granted in 2014.

The decision is controversial; as 1998 legislation barred any new school from adopting selective admissions. This action was seen as a way round this legislation. It was supported by Kent County Council and an active group of parents, but opposed by others.

An earlier attempt had been rejected by the then Education Secretary Michael Gove in December 2013, as a single-sex school could not legally open a co-educational annexe. Parents had been balloted on whether the school should change its status and they had chosen to remain a girls only school. Kent County Council revised the scheme so the units became modular, and the application was resubmitted. It is this application that was approved. The annexe opened in September 2017.

== Results ==
Exam results for the 2013 academic year showed that 100% of pupils attained 5 GCSE grades A* to C (including English and maths). 99.1% of the A level grades were A* to E. The school was judged by OFSTED to be academically 'outstanding' prior to its conversion to an academy. OFSTED state that you are not the same entity and have no previous inspection grade once converted. It was first inspected in 2022 and found to be 'Requires Improvement'. It has since been inspected in October 2024 and judged as 'Good' in all categories.

== Alumni ==
- Nina Ridge, weather forecaster on BBC One
- Abbie Hutty, mechanical engineer

== See also ==
- Knole Academy
- Tonbridge Grammar School
- Tunbridge Wells Girls' Grammar School
- Tunbridge Wells Grammar School for Boys

== Notes and references ==
Footnotes

References

- Adams, Richard (15 October 2015). "Conservatives give green light to first grammar school in half a century". Guardian.
- Adams, Richard; Nardelli, Alberto (15 October 2015). "Kent grammar: what you need to know about the first new selective school in 50 years". Guardian.
- "Sevenoaks grammar school annexe bids rejected". BBC. 13 December 2013.
- Coughlan, Sean (15 October 2015). "First 'new' grammar school in 50 years". BBC.
- King, Debbie (26 September 2018). "Weald of Kent's new head insists Sevenoaks annexe is part of main school". KentLive.
- Rusbridge-Thomas, Annabel (10 August 2014). "Planning permission approved for Sevenoaks Grammar annexe on former Wilderness site". Kent Messenger.
- Savvides, Tom (18 November 2016). "Gymnast Max Whitlock takes a tumble in Tonbridge". ITV News.
- Walker, Peter (15 October 2015). "Kent grammar decision is 'a bad day for education', says head of nearby school". Guardian.
- "Admissions policy- Kent Count Council" (PDF). Kent County Council. 2015.
