= Abbie Hutty =

British mechanical engineer

Abbie Hutty CEng
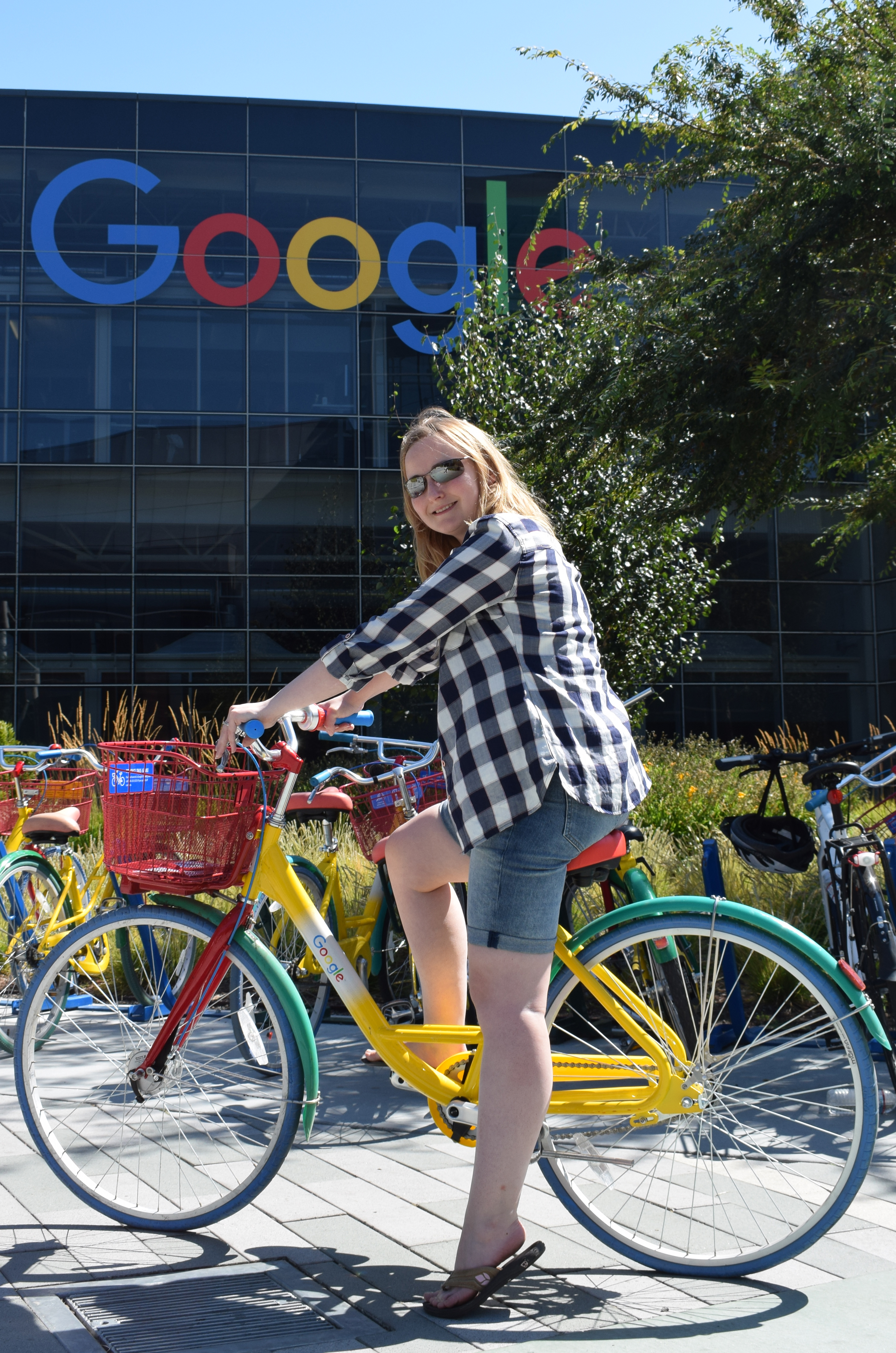
- Abbie Hutty at Google Mountain View in 2017
- Born: Abigail Hutty
- Known for: Work on ESA's ExoMars project
- Scientific career
- Fields: Mechanical Engineering
- Workplaces: European Space Agency

Abigail Hutty (born 1986 or 1987) is a British mechanical engineer based in Stevenage. She has worked as the lead structures engineer on the European Space Agency ExoMars rover, now the Rosalind Franklin rover vehicle. In 2016, she was elected as the youngest ever Fellow of the Institution of Mechanical Engineers. She advocates the science and technology education of young people and promotion of careers in the space industry. Her public appearances have included the Royal Institution Christmas Lectures and The Sky at Night.

== Early life and education ==
Hutty grew up in Kent, completing A-Levels in Maths, Design and Technology, Physics and French at Weald of Kent Grammar School for Girls in 2005. Hutty became interested in engineering during her GCSEs, watching the Martian mission of the Beagle 2. She studied Mechanical Engineering at the University of Surrey, graduating in 2010, and then completed a one-year placement with Surrey Satellite Technology, before beginning a graduate program at Airbus Defence and Space.

== Career ==
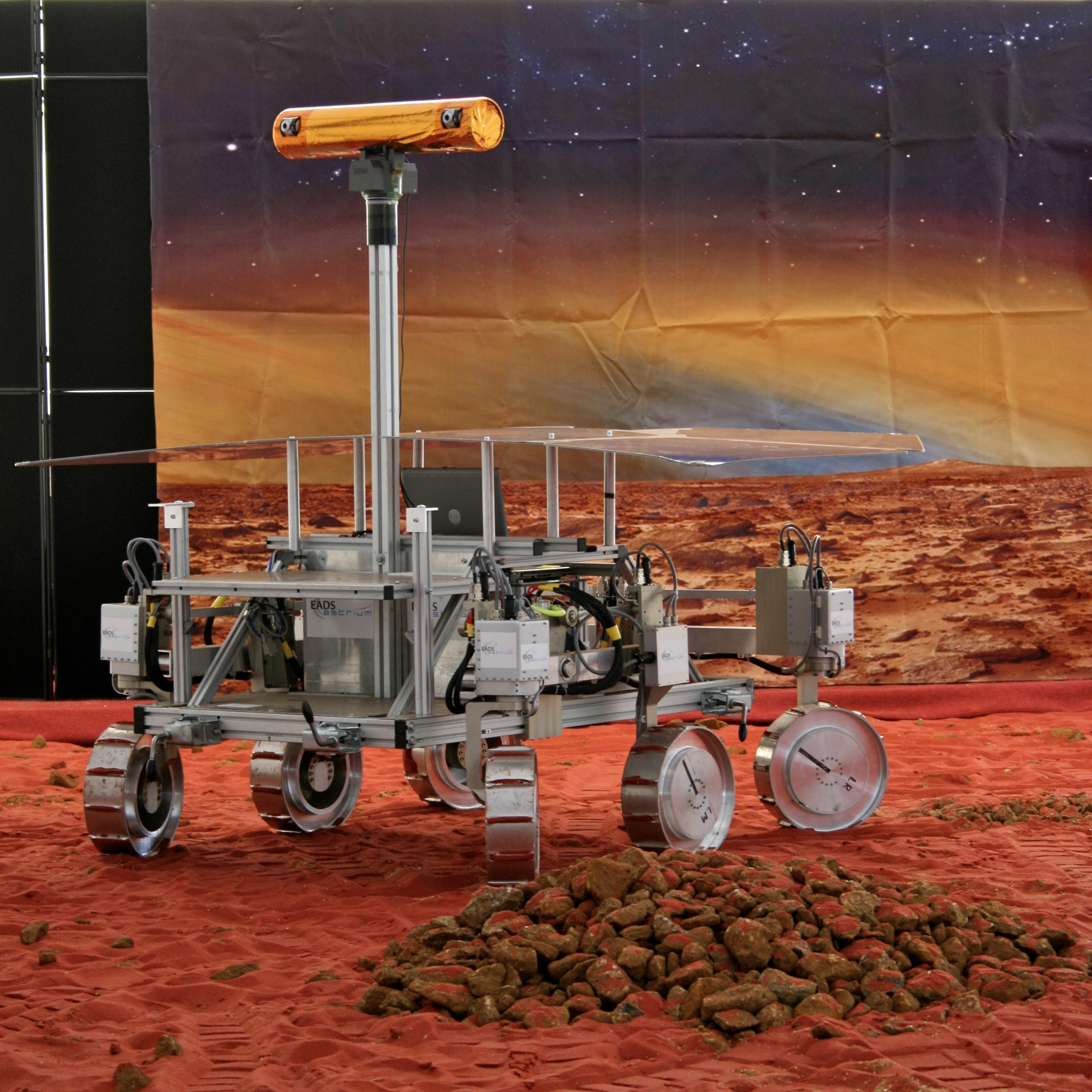
A prototype ExoMars rover at the Royal Astronomical Society National Annual Meeting 2009 in Hatfield, England

Hutty joined the Airbus Defence and Space graduate scheme in 2010, focussing on dynamic and stress analysis. She was offered a permanent position in the Spacecraft Structures Engineering Group and began work on the ExoMars rover, now the Rosalind Franklin rover, which is due to launch in the mid-2020s. Her work was to bring the design to the manufacturing stage. In 2014 she became a Chartered Engineer with the Institution of Mechanical Engineers. She subsequently became the Senior Spacecraft Structures Engineer for ExoMars at Airbus.

== Awards ==
- 2010: IMechE Frederick Barnes Waldron Best Student Award
- 2012: Astrium STEM Ambassador Award
- 2013: IET Young Woman Engineer of the Year
- 2013: IMechE Young Member of the Year
- 2014: Royal Academy of Engineering Rising Star Award
- 2016: Elected youngest Fellow of the Institution of Mechanical Engineers

== Public engagement ==
Hutty has worked with the media to promote engineering, taking part in the BBC's Sky at Night, Stargazing Live and Euronews. She is a science, technology, engineering, and mathematics (STEM) ambassador, acting as a guest judge at national STEM fairs and speaking at schools, museums and learning centres.

She appeared in the 2014 Royal Institution Christmas Lectures. Alongside talking about the ExoMars mission, she regularly dispels common misconceptions the public hold about engineering. Hutty gave a TEDxLondon talk in 2017, titled "Why we need new role models in science and engineering". Later in the year, she appeared on BBC 2's Horizon discussing the practicality of people travelling to Mars and has hosted tours of the Airbus facilities. She is enthusiastic about the possibility of finding life on Mars.

== Diversity ==
After winning the IET Young Woman Engineer of the Year award in 2013, Hutty became a more active campaigner for diversity within the engineering profession. In 2016, Hutty was listed in the top 20 influential women in engineering to follow on Twitter. That year she featured on the "Finding Ada" podcast, which highlights the work of women in STEM, describing her role at Airbus. Hutty is a 'role model' to many young women and engineers, and regularly blogs about her experiences in the industry. She took part in the 2015 social campaign "#ILookLikeAnEngineer" to debunk the public image of working engineers. In 2017, she was invited to speak at the United Nations Expert Meeting on Space for Women.
