= Trinity School, Sevenoaks =

Trinity School

Location
- Seal Hollow Rd; Sevenoaks, Kent, TN13 3SL; England; 51.2888956°N 0.1688979°E

Information
- Type: Free school
- Motto: Truth, Excellence, Love, Leadership, and Service
- Religious affiliation: Christian
- Established: September 2013
- Founder: Matthew Tate
- Department for Education URN: 139554 Tables
- Ofsted: Reports
- Chair: Cress Iveson
- Headmaster: Matthew Pawson
- Gender: Coeducational
- Age: 11 to 18
- Houses: Barret, Faraday, Fry, Wilberforce, King, Lewis.
Colour
- Website: http://www.trinitysevenoaks.org.uk

Trinity School is a coeducational Christian secondary school and sixth form based in Sevenoaks, Kent, England. The school opened in September 2013 at the Wildernesse School site under the Free School initiative set forward by the coalition government, and now has 1140 pupils. The first headmaster was co-founder Matthew Tate who was replaced by Dr. Matthew Pawson in September 2016.

Ofsted rated the school as "Good" in 2015, 2018 and 2024.

== Theft ==
In September 2017, a Pair of brothers Brian and Daniel Hitchcock broke into the school grounds by cutting through a lock in the school's sports field, and smashed through two floor-to-ceiling windows to access the IT lab of the school. Stealing over 87 computers from the site. The heist was performed with two Offroad Motorcycles.
