= Sevenoaks =

Market town and civil parish in western Kent, England

Coordinates: 51.2781°N 0.1874°E

- Town
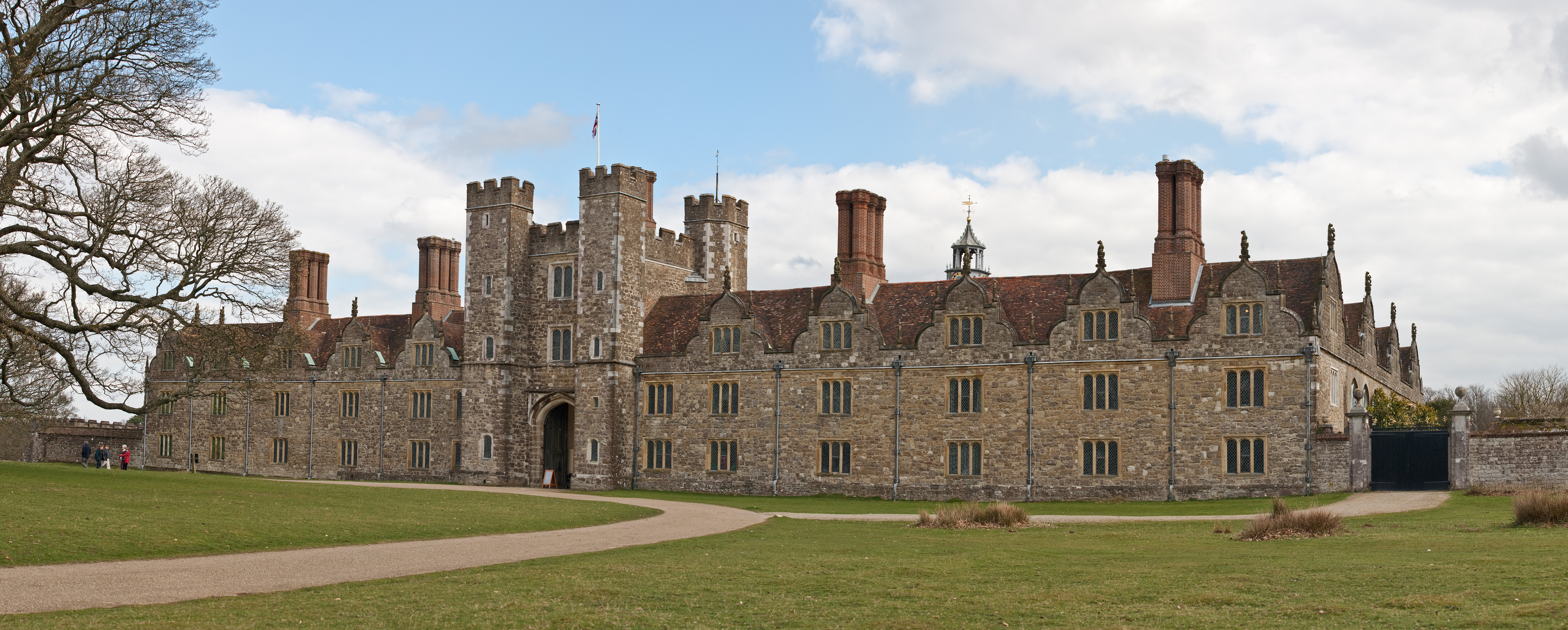
- Knole House

- Location within Kent
- Population: 21,167 (2021 census)
- Demonym: Sennockian
- OS grid reference: TQ525555
- Civil parish: Sevenoaks
- District: Sevenoaks
- Shire county: Kent
- Region: South East
- Country: England
- Sovereign state: United Kingdom
- Post town: Sevenoaks
- Postcode district: TN13, TN14, TN15
- Dialling code: 01732
- Police: Kent
- Fire: Kent
- Ambulance: South East Coast
- UK Parliament: Sevenoaks

Sevenoaks is a town and civil parish in Kent, England. Situated 21 miles (34 km) south-east of Charing Cross, Sevenoaks is served by the South Eastern Main Line commuter railway into London. It is the principal town of the Sevenoaks district, followed by Swanley and Edenbridge. At the 2021 census, the parish had a population of 21,167, while the larger built-up area had a population of 26,475.

A settlement was recorded in the 13th century, when a market was established. Construction of Knole House in the 15th century helped develop the village. Sevenoaks became part of the modern communications network when one of the early turnpikes was opened in the 18th century; the railway was relatively late in reaching it. In the 21st century, it has a large commuting population. The nearby Fort Halstead defence installation was formerly a major local employer. Located to the south-east of the town is Knole Park, within which lies Knole House.

Educational establishments in the town include Trinity School, Knole Academy, and the independent Sevenoaks School.

== Etymology ==
In 1100, the name of the settlement was recorded as Seouenaca (here the "v" is interchangeable with "u"), in turn derived from the 10th-century Old English seofon combined with ac: the place of the seven oaks. The original seven oaks were in Knole Park and have been replaced many times.

Alternatively, Baedeker's Guide of 1887 states that Sevenoaks "is said to be a corruption of Chevenix".

== History ==
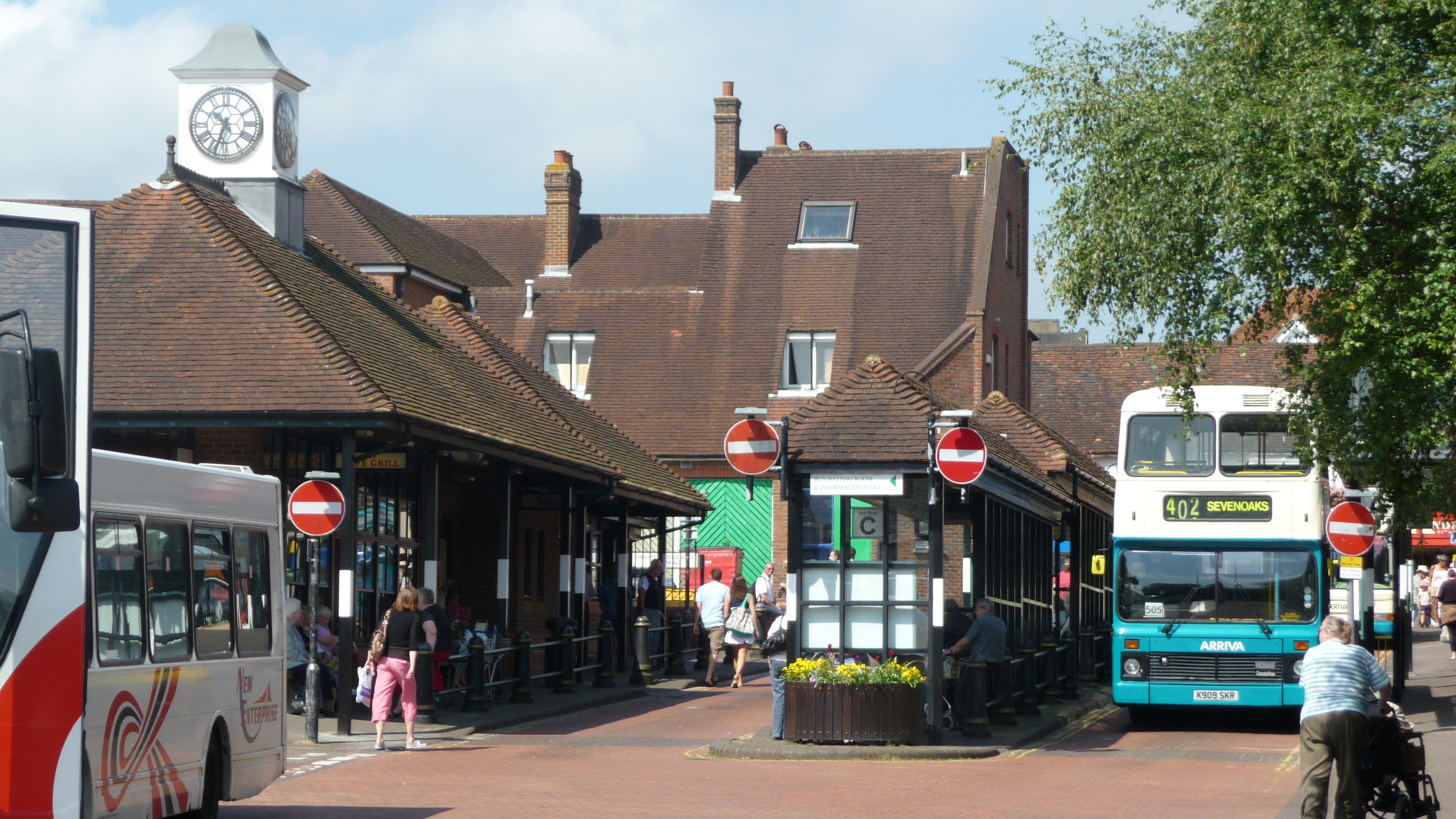
Sevenoaks bus station in June 2009

There are few records earlier than the 13th century for the town, when it was given market status. The weekly cattle market was held in Hitchen Hatch Lane until 1999. It was closed to make way for the 160 BT building in London Road. A food market is held in the centre of town every Saturday. In the Middle Ages, two hospitals were provided by religious orders for the care of old or sick people, especially those going on pilgrimage.

Sevenoaks School, at the south end of High Street, is one of the oldest lay foundations in England. It was founded by William Sevenoke in 1432. Sevenoke, a foundling, had been brought up in the town. In later life he became a merchant and served as alderman, sheriff and Mayor of London. Founding the school and adjacent almshouses was his thanks to the town. In 1560 the school was granted letters patent by Queen Elizabeth I and became known as Queen Elizabeth's Grammar School.

In 1456, Thomas Bourchier, Archbishop of Canterbury, purchased the Knole estate and built Knole House. The mansion dominates the town.

The eponymous oak trees in Knole Park have been replaced several times over the centuries. In 1902, seven oaks were planted on the north side of The Vine cricket ground to commemorate the coronation of King Edward VII. During the Great Storm of 1987, six of those trees were blown down. Their replacements, planted in a ceremony involving well-known people from television shows such as Blue Peter and locals such as Gloria Hunniford and Caron Keating, were vandalised, leaving the one mature tree standing. The trees have been replaced and eight oak trees of varying ages line The Vine.

A serious railway accident occurred nearby on 24 August 1927. Southern Railway K class passenger tank engine No. A800 River Cray was derailed hauling a Cannon Street to Deal express, knocking a road bridge and killing 13 passengers. The locomotive crew survived. The entire K class was subsequently rebuilt to prevent such an event from occurring again. The accident called into question the quality of track laying in the area.

== Healthcare ==
A number of institutions provided healthcare in the 19-20th centuries including:

- Sevenoaks Hospital
- Emily Jackson Children's Hip Hospital established by Sevenoaks resident Emily Jackson.

== Governance ==
Sevenoaks is governed by a town council with sixteen members. The town is divided into six wards: Kippington, Northern, St John's, Town, Wildernesse and Eastern. The offices of Sevenoaks District Council are located in the town.

Coat of arms of Sevenoaks Town Council
Notes Granted to Sevenoaks Urban District Council on 3 December 1964 (badge on 20 March 1970), transferred to successor parish council on 16 April 1975 Crest Out of a Circlet Argent charged with eight Lozenges throughout Gules a demi Horse supporting a Lance erect Argent tipped Or entwined about with a Branch of Vine fructed proper; Mantled Gules doubled Or. Motto Floreant Septem Quercus Badge An Estoile of seven rays Argent surmounted by seven Acorns their stalks conjoined Or.

== Geography ==
The town is situated at the junction of two main routes from the north before traffic climbs over the Greensand Ridge which crosses Kent from west to east; that situation is similar to Maidstone and Ashford. This road was one of the earliest in the county to be turnpiked in 1709, because of the clay soils.

The valley to the north is that of the River Darent; that river turns to the north to cut through the North Downs. Several lakes are located along the course of the river here, the result of the extraction of sand and gravel in the past.

The built-up area of the town has developed primarily along the main roads. The settlement of Riverhead to the north-west is the largest; other parts of the town (in clockwise order from the north) include Greatness; Wildernesse; St John's; Hollybush; Sevenoaks Common; and Kippington.

== Demography ==
In 1801, the parish had a population of 2,600.

Census population of Sevenoaks parish
Census	Population	Female	Male	Households	Source
2001	18,588	9,713	8,875	7,609	
2011	20,409	10,501	9,908	8,118	
2021	21,167	10,895	10,272	8,347	

At the 2011 census, the Office for National Statistics defined a "Sevenoaks urban area" with a population of 24,987. In 2013, it defined a "Sevenoaks built-up area" – including Chipstead, Dunton Green, Godden Green, Riverhead, and Seal – with a population of 29,506. Following the 2021 census, it defined a new "Sevenoaks built-up area" – including Chipstead, Dunton Green and Riverhead, but not Seal or Godden Green – with a population of 26,475.

== Economy ==
Sevenoaks, like much of West Kent, is characterised by high levels of economic activity and a skilled resident workforce. A large proportion of that workforce commutes elsewhere to their places of employment, mostly to central London. Those factors have led to high house prices and pressure on the local area to build more houses. Many of those houses attract high prices, making it difficult for people to buy property. A wide range of middle-class occupations are in short supply locally. Industries such as finance and business services tend to predominate. Transport links are generally very busy and town centre congestion is common at peak times.

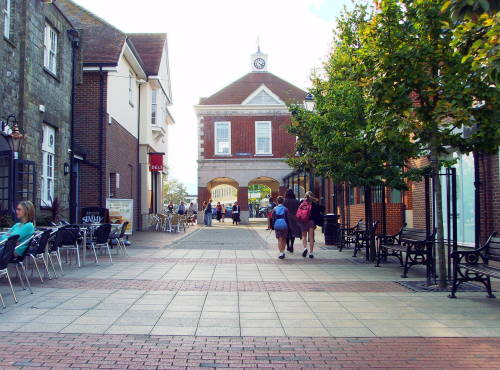
Bligh's Shopping Development

The main industrial area is located north of the town, alongside the A225. Sevenoaks Quarry is on Bat and Ball Road, also to the north.

The shopping area in High Street includes the new Bligh's development. It is a typical small town centre, with one M&S department store having opened in 2014.

Bligh's shopping development opened in phases in 2002. The site was originally a meadow, before becoming a bus station and car park. Access can be gained from several directions including the High Street and London Road. Much of the architecture is based on slightly earlier periods but with a contemporary edge.

Music string manufacturer RotoSound is based in Sevenoaks. The company's strings have been used by Jimi Hendrix, Brian May, and Pete Townshend. In the US, the company is associated with the British Invasion sound of the 1960s and 1970s.

== Landmarks ==
Knole Park is a 1,000-acre (4 km^{2}) SSSI and medieval deer park containing several thousand trees, a cricket pitch and a golf course running across. In its centre is Knole, the home of the Sackville family (the Earls of Dorset) since it was given to them by Queen Elizabeth I in 1577. The estate is owned and maintained by the National Trust, although the Sackvilles still live there.

Riverhill House and gardens are located directly to the south of Knole Park, on the southern edge of Sevenoaks. The house and gardens, which were first built in the 16th century, are privately owned by Jane Margaret Rogers but are periodically open to the public.

== Religious sites ==
There are four churches within the Church of England in Sevenoaks, dedicated to St Luke, St Mary Kippington, St Nicholas (Evangelical), and St John the Baptist (Anglo-Catholic, under the pastoral care of the Bishop of Richborough). The three churches of St Luke's, St Mary Kippington together with St Mary the Virgin Riverhead with Dunton Green make up the West Sevenoaks Team Ministry and are mid-Anglican.

=== St Nicholas Church ===
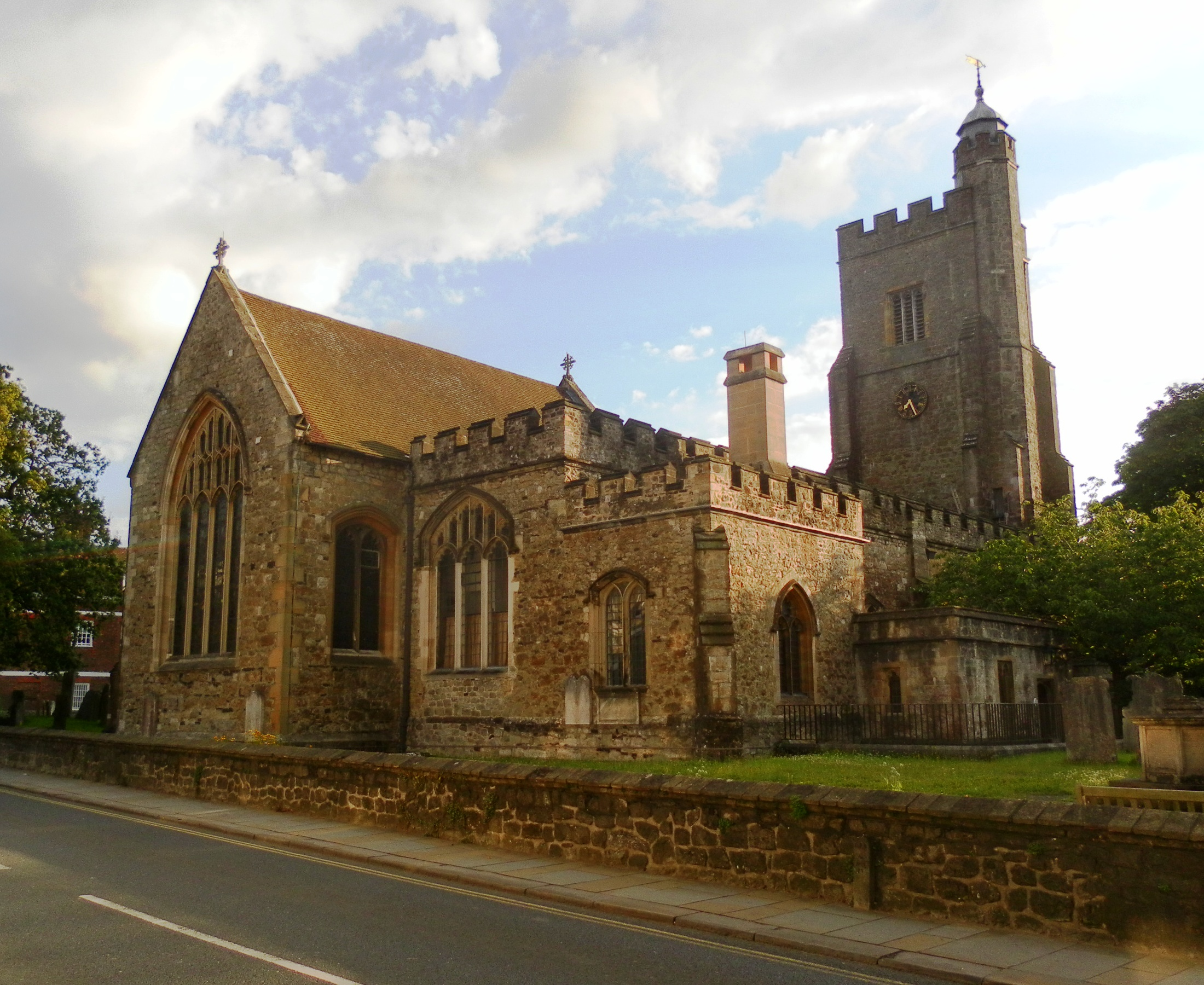
The historic medieval parish church of St Nicholas is today one of four churches in the town in the Church of England and is evangelical.

The historic medieval parish church of Sevenoaks is St Nicholas' Church. As with many other medieval churches in the area the first written reference to the church is in the Textus Roffensis (about 1120). The current main shape of the church is 13th Century, and rebuilt in the 15th Century.

=== Other Christian denominations ===
The Roman Catholic church is dedicated to St Thomas of Canterbury. Mass has been celebrated on the site since 1880. Additions to the church occurred in 1894, 1927 and 1994.

There are some eight other denominations represented in the town. These include Hope Church (Charismatic); Christ Church Sevenoaks, a constituent church of the United Reformed Church; St John's Hill United Reformed Church; the Drive Methodist Church, the Vine Evangelical Church (non-denominational); and also the Vine Baptist church.

== Education ==
There is one mixed state secondary school, the Knole Academy, which was created in 2009 from an amalgamation of Wildernesse School (for boys) and Bradbourne School (for girls) and four state primary schools, one of which is Church of England and another of which is Catholic.

Lady Boswell's C of E Primary School on Plymouth Drive dates back to 1675 and is one of the oldest state primary schools in England. Lady Margaret Boswell left a bequest to educate 12 poor scholars of the town. The first school building was erected on London Road in 1818: it is a Grade II Listed building with a neo-Classical frontage, now called Lady Boswell House. The school moved to its current site in 1972. The school have an association with St Nicholas's Church and the Rector of St Nicholas is a Foundation Governor.

A Christian Free School called Trinity School, opened in the 2010s on the Seal Hollow Road on the north-eastern edge of town, and Seal Hollow Road is also the site of the controversial first new UK Grammar school, an annex of Weald of Kent Grammar School for girls in Tonbridge, in over 50 years. A further annex grammar school, of Tunbridge Wells Grammar School for Boys, opened in September 2021.

Among the high number of independent schools are Sevenoaks School, a co-educational boarding and day school; The Granville School, a girls' prep school 3–11 (with boys in pre-school); and Walthamstow Hall, an all-girls day school. There are several preparatory schools, including Solefield School, New Beacon School and Sevenoaks Preparatory School.

== Transport ==
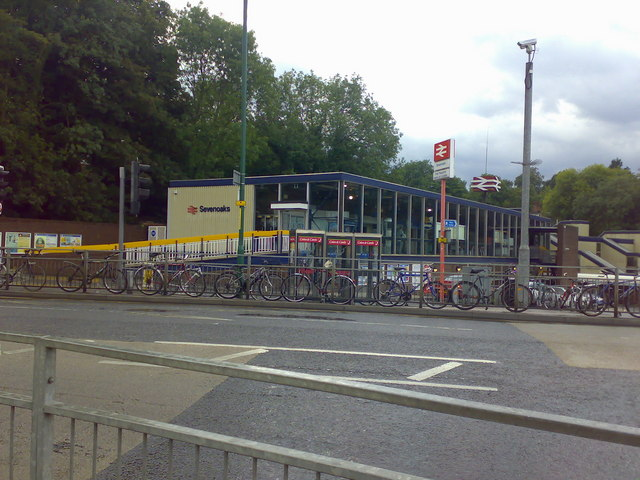
Sevenoaks railway station, prior to 2013 redevelopments

There are two railway stations in Sevenoaks, with two more on the outskirts:

- Sevenoaks railway station is the town's principal station, sited on the South Eastern Main Line. Southeastern operates services between London Charing Cross and Dover Priory, Hastings and Ramsgate. It is also the terminus for Thameslink suburban stopping services to London Blackfriars on the Darent Valley Line.
- Bat & Ball lies one stop closer to London on the Darent Valley line, north-east of Sevenoaks. (Note: Its name derives from a nearby public house, which is no longer in existence.) It hosts Thameslink services between London Blackfriars and Sevenoaks.
- Otford lies two stops closer to London on the Darent Valley line, north-east of Sevenoaks. It is served both by Southeastern and Thameslink trains.
- Dunton Green is one stop closer to London on the South Eastern Main Line, north-west of Sevenoaks; it is served by Southeastern trains between London Charing Cross and Sevenoaks.

Sevenoaks is located at the junction of two ancient roads heading south from London and Dartford to the Weald. In 1710, part of one of the roads – from Sevenoaks through Tonbridge and Pembury to Tunbridge Wells – was the first in Kent to be turnpiked; others followed within the century. It became the A21 road in the 1920s; the road now bypasses the town, and also takes traffic to the M25 London Orbital motorway at junction 5. The Dartford road is now the A225. The cross-country A25 road passes through the north of the town along the Vale of Holmesdale.

Bus routes in and around Sevenoaks are provided by GoBus and Arriva Southern Counties.

== Leisure ==
Sevenoaks Wildlife Reserve is to the north of the town centre, around one of the former gravel pits. It is a Site of Special Scientific Interest, covering some 175 acres (71 ha).

Sevenoaks Scouts is the active Scouting organisation in the town.

Sevenoaks Information provides a comprehensive What's On events diary for the town and surrounding area.

Sevenoaks Community Forum is an active discussion forum for news and events within Sevenoaks and surrounding areas.

Sevenoaks District Community Directory provides information on local leisure facilities, plus details of clubs, societies and organisations covering all activities across the Sevenoaks area.

== Sport ==
Sevenoaks has three non-League football clubs: Corinthian Football Club who play at Gay Dawn Farm, Sevenoaks Town F.C. who play at Greatness Park and Ide Hill F.C. who currently play in Borough Green due to construction of a new club house in Ide Hill village.

The Vine Cricket Ground is one of the oldest cricket venues in England. It was given to the town of Sevenoaks in 1773 by John Frederick Sackville, 3rd Duke of Dorset (1745–1799) and owner of Knole House. The land was thought to have previously been used as a vineyard for the Archbishops of Canterbury.

Sevenoaks Suns is a women's basketball team that plays in the top flight of UK women's basketball, the WBBL. In 2017, the team won the WBBL Trophy, defeating the Leicester Riders 82–67 in the final in Glasgow.

Sevenoaks Hockey Club is a large club with a clubhouse at The Vine Pavilion. HC Knole Park is also based in Sevenoaks.

Sevenoaks has two leisure centres; many sports and other activities are available.

Sevenoaks Padel Club has three outdoor Padel courts at Polhill Garden Centre.

== Culture ==
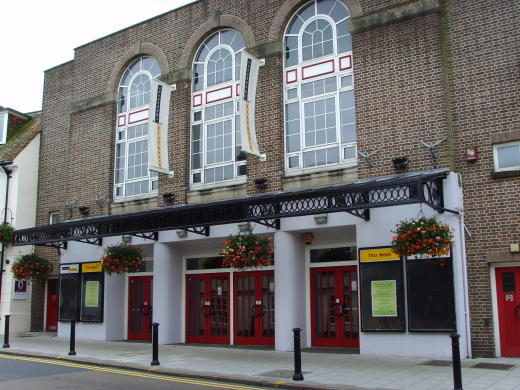
The Stag Theatre

The Stag Theatre, cinema and the Plaza music and conference complex is located at the top of London Road (TN13 1ZZ). It was reopened as a community arts centre by Sevenoaks Town Council on 2 January 2009 and is supported by a strong network of volunteers. It became a not-for-profit charity in 2010. The multiplex cinema is open daily showing films. Around £550,000 has invested in equipment, infrastructure and the building since it re-opened.

The demonym for a person from Sevenoaks is Sennockian. The demonym Old Sennockian is used by alumni of Sevenoaks School.

== Local media ==
The local radio station for Sevenoaks is KMFM West Kent, although no local programmes are broadcast on the station due to it being part of the KMFM network across Kent that broadcasts from Medway. The station still receives local adverts, what-on local events and sponsors.

Sevenoaks is served by county wide stations BBC Radio Kent, Heart South, Smooth Radio and many London stations.

Television signals are received from the Crystal Palace TV transmitter because of its proximity to London, placing Sevenoaks in the BBC London and ITV London areas. However, the town can also receive the Bluebell Hill TV transmitter which broadcast BBC South East & ITV Meridian and also through satellite television such as Freesat.

The local paper is the Sevenoaks Chronicle, which is published every Thursday by the Courier Media Group.

== Notable people ==
- John Donne (1572–1631), poet, Rector of Sevenoaks 1616 until his death
- Anthony Knyvett (d. 1554), executed at Sevenoaks together with his brother William after Wyatt's Rebellion
- Thomas Graham Jackson (1835–1924), architect
- Elsie Knocker, M. M. (1884–1978), nurse, author and Heroine of Pervyse
- Jeffery Amherst (1717–1791), British Army officer
- George Kelson (1835–1920), amateur cricketer, fisherman and author
- H. G. Wells (1866–1946), writer
- W. H. Davies (1871–1940), Welsh tramp-poet, lived in Sevenoaks 1907–1914
- Arthur Herbert Thompson (1890–1916), amateur footballer and English soldier
- C. H. Sisson (1914–2003), poet
- Edward Thomas (1878–1917), poet
- Netta Muskett (1887–1963), novelist
- Robert Charles Zaehner (1913–1974), academic whose field of study was Eastern religions
- Basil Copper (1924–2013), writer
- Peter Sissons (1942–2019), newsreader
- Bill Bruford (b. 1949), jazz and rock drummer
- Charlie Whiting (1952–2019), FIA Formula One Race Director
- Timothy Laurence (b. 1955) (husband of Anne, Princess Royal) attended the Sevenoaks School
- Tony Hayward (b. 1957), former CEO of BP
- Diana, Princess of Wales (1961–1997), went to West Heath School in Sevenoaks
- James Whitbourn (1963–2024), composer
- Phil Hartnoll (b. 1964), musician with Orbital
- Anton Du Beke (b. 1966), ballroom dancer
- Paul Hartnoll (b. 1968), musician with Orbital
- Matthew Branton (b. 1968), novelist
- Murray Lachlan Young (b. 1969), performance poet
- Joe Wilkinson (b. 1975), comedian
- Mike Conway (b. 1983) 2006 British Formula Three champion and 2019–20 FIA World Endurance Championship winner
- Lizzy Yarnold (b. 1988), skeleton two time winter Olympic gold medalist.

== Twinnings ==
Sevenoaks is twinned with:

- Pontoise, France
- Rheinbach, Germany
