= Development corporation =

Organisation to foster urban development

A development corporation or development firm is an organisation established by a government for the purpose of urban development. They often are responsible for the development of new suburban areas or the redevelopment of existing ones.

== Australia ==
In Australia development corporations are often responsible for the economic promotion and growth of areas considered to be under-performing economically. Such corporations include:

- Central Coast Development Corporation (1998–); previously known as the Festival Development Corporation
- Cooks Cove Development Corporation; based in The Rocks
- Hunter Development Corporation (2007–); based in Newcastle
- Honeysuckle Development Corporation (1992–2007; merged with the Regional Land Management Corporation to form the Hunter Development Corporation); based in Newcastle
- Macquarie Point Development Corporation (2012–); based in Hobart, Tasmania
- Northern Tasmania Development Corporation (2017-); North Eastern Tasmania, including Launceston.
- South Sydney Development Corporation (1996–2005); responsible for managing the Green Square area

== Denmark ==
- Ørestad Development Corporation (1993–2007); responsible for urban redevelopment of Ørestad. It also constructed parts of the Copenhagen Metro.

== India ==
- City and Industrial Development Corporation (1970–); agency of the Government of Maharashtra. Constructed the planned town of Navi Mumbai. Currently conducting urban infrastructure and new town developments.
- Housing and Urban Development Corporation (1970–); agency of the Ministry of Housing and Urban Poverty Alleviation. Responsible for building affordable housing and managing urban development.

== Israel ==
- Moriah Jerusalem Development Corporation (1986–); established by the Jerusalem Municipality.

== South Africa ==
- Coega Development Corporation
- Eastern Cape Development Corporation
- Free State Development Corporation

== United Kingdom ==
In the United Kingdom, New Town Development Corporations were organisations established under the New Towns Act 1946 (9 & 10 Geo. 6. c. 68) by the UK government, charged with the urban development of an area, outside the usual system of Town and Country Planning in the United Kingdom. Originally intended to manage the development of New Towns in the United Kingdom, they were also established for more substantial urban renewal programmes by the Town Development Act 1952.

=== Urban development corporations in England and Wales ===
Name	Area	Timeframe	Notes
Birmingham Heartlands	950 ha in the Nechells area	1992–1998	
Black Country	parts of Sandwell and Walsall, in West Midlands	1987–1998	
Bristol	parts of eastern Bristol	1989–1995	
Cardiff Bay	Cardiff docklands area, in City of Cardiff and Vale of Glamorgan	1987–2000	
Central Manchester	180 ha of Manchester, near Trafford/Salford border	1988–1996	
Leeds	540 ha of Leeds, along River Aire/Leeds and Liverpool Canal, and south of city centre	1988–1995	
London Docklands	London Docklands	1981–1998	
London Thames Gateway	Lower Lea Valley (parts of Hackney, Tower Hamlets, Newham and Waltham Forest); London Riverside (southern part of Barking & Dagenham, Havering and Newham)	2004–2013	
Merseyside	Merseyside	1981–1998	
Plymouth	67 ha of Plymouth docklands	1993–1998	
Sheffield	Lower Don Valley	1988–1997	
Teesside	large tracts of land on River Tees, some in Hartlepool	1987–1998	
Thurrock Thames Gateway	Thurrock	2003–2012	
Trafford Park	large area in Trafford and Salford along the Manchester Ship Canal	1987–1998	
Tyne and Wear	banks of the River Tyne and River Wear	1987–1998	
West Northamptonshire	Northamptonshire (parts of Northampton, Daventry and Towcester)	2006–2014	

=== New town development corporations ===
Name	Area	Timeframe	Notes
Aycliffe and Peterlee	Newton Aycliffe and Peterlee	to April 1, 1988	
Basildon	Basildon		
Bracknell	Bracknell		
Central Lancashire	Central Lancashire		
Corby	Corby		
Crawley	Crawley		
Cumbernauld	Cumbernauld	to March 31, 1996	
Cwmbran	Cwmbran	to April 1, 1988	
Ebbsfleet	Ebbsfleet Valley	2015 -	
East Kilbride	East Kilbride		
Glenrothes	Glenrothes		
Harlow	Harlow		
Hemel Hempstead	Hemel Hempstead		
Livingston	Livingston		
Milton Keynes	Milton Keynes, Buckinghamshire	to April 1, 1992	
Peterborough	Peterborough	to October 1, 1988	
Redditch	Redditch	1964–1985	
Runcorn	Runcorn		merged to form Warrington and Runcorn
Skelmersdale	Skelmersdale	1964-1984	
Stevenage	Stevenage	11 Nov 1946 to 1980	
Telford	Telford, Shropshire	to October 1, 1991	
Warrington	Warrington		merged to form Warrington and Runcorn
Warrington and Runcorn	Warrington and Runcorn	to October 1, 1989	
Washington	Washington	to April 1, 1988	

=== Mayoral development corporations ===
The Localism Act 2011 permitted the Mayor of London to create mayoral development corporations in Greater London. The Cities and Local Government Devolution Act 2016 permitted the creation of mayoral development corporations by mayors of combined authority areas.

Name	Established by	Area	Start	Notes
London Legacy	Mayor of London	London Olympic Park	9 March 2012	
Old Oak and Park Royal	Mayor of London	Old Oak Common	1 April 2015	
South Tees	Mayor of the Tees Valley	Teesworks	1 August 2017	
Stockport	Mayor of Greater Manchester	Stockport	2 September 2019	
Middleton	Mayor of Greater Manchester	Middleton	2025	
Middlesbrough	Mayor of the Tees Valley	Middlesbrough	27 February 2023	
Hartlepool	Mayor of the Tees Valley	Hartlepool	27 February 2023	
Oxford Street	Mayor of London	Oxford Street	1 January 2026	
Old Trafford Regeneration	Mayor of Greater Manchester	Old Trafford	23 January 2026	

As of 2025, a mayoral development corporation has been proposed for Middleton town centre.

=== Northern Ireland ===
Maze Long Kesh Development Corporation has been charged with the development of the site of HM Prison Maze.

== See also ==
- Laganside Corporation, Urban Development Corporation for Belfast, Northern Ireland
- Community Futures in Canada
- Land development
