= Peterborough Development Corporation =

The Peterborough Development Corporation was established in February 1968, as a national government initiative, following the city's designation as a third-wave New Town in July 1967. It was based in the Gilbert Scott designed Peterscourt in the city. It was overseen by the Minister of Housing and Local Government, but sought close collaboration with Peterborough City Council and the Huntingdon and Peterborough (from 1974 Cambridgeshire) County Council.

Development Corporations are bodies charged with the urban development of an area, outside the usual system of Town and Country Planning in the United Kingdom. The corporation's task was to provide homes, work and the full range of facilities and services for an additional 70,000 people, drawn mainly from the Greater London area.

The Development Corporation was officially wound-up in September 1988. However, by this time, the Peterborough Development Agency had already been established as its successor to work towards the city's future prosperity. All remaining assets and liabilities of the corporation were transferred to the Commission for New Towns.

An urban regeneration company named Opportunity Peterborough, initially under the chairmanship of Lord Mawhinney, was set up by the Office of the Deputy Prime Minister in 2005 to oversee Peterborough's future development.

== See also ==
- Development Corporation
- Commission for New Towns
- New towns in the United Kingdom
