= Birmingham Heartlands Development Corporation =

- Formation: 1992
- Dissolved: 1998
- Headquarters: Birmingham
- Chair: Sir Reginald Eyre
- Chief executive: Alan Osborne; Jim Beeston

The Birmingham Heartlands Development Corporation was established in 1992 to develop 9.5 square kilometres of land in the East of Birmingham.

== History ==
=== Pre-designation ===
By the 1980s, the area, which was loosely defined as Nechells, consisted of run down housing, derelict wasteland and former industries. It was showing multiple signs of inner city decay and housed around 13,000 people. Proposals to develop the area were first launched in 1987 by Birmingham City Council. The area was not designated as a central government development corporation, however, the government allowed a local public-private partnership to develop plans through a relaxed planning regime through designation as a Simplified Planning Zone. A development agency, named Birmingham Heartlands Ltd., was set up in 1988. 35% was owned by Birmingham City Council whilst the remaining 65% was owned mainly by construction companies. The Chamber of Commerce was given one share and the right to vote on company decisions. Birmingham City Council provided to councillors to be board members whilst the other members were from three local development companies and two nationally based development companies. These nationally based development companies were Tarmac and Wimpey.

In 1988, the development agency adopted a development strategy which focussed upon economic development, the improvement of housing and the improvement of the environment. The Heartlands area was broken up into project areas. Government Estate Action funding was used to improve housing and to provide a mixture of tenures in the area which had been dominated mainly by council housing. The funding was provided in the project areas that had been specifically designated to be focussed upon housing. Areas closer to the city centre were given commercial designations. To prevent conflicts with city centre uses, the commercial areas in the Heartlands were targeted at a specific market. Aston Science Park, which had opened in 1983, was further developed and close to the science park, the Aston Waterlinks village was constructed. This was built using £6.2 million of government City Grant. The business village, located alongside the Birmingham and Fazeley Canal, was constructed by Waterlinks plc, a company set up by four of the five board members, to provide jobs for 750 people. It cost a total of £28 million.

When the government launched the City Challenge Partnership scheme as a consolidated inner city funding regime, Birmingham Heartlands Ltd. entered the competition, however, failed to win. This led to a radical organisational change. The public-private partnership moved power to the government. In May 1992, the government redesignated it a Development Corporation for a five-year period. The Development Corporation came into being on 1 July 1992.

=== Development Corporation ===
Following the redesignation of the area, the Birmingham Heartlands Development Corporation bought out Heartlands company interests and took over nominations to the board, as well as the direction of strategy. This was made possible by the provision of £50 million by the government and by further grants from the European Regional Development Fund. This was seen as the former company trying to prevent the partnership halting its work because of problems with the private sector.

Heartlands was designated an Assisted Area status, allowing the area to be granted funds by the Department of Trade and Industry. The funds were used in the construction of the Heartlands spine road on the A47, which was completed in 1997. Alongside the Grand Union Canal, 0.4 square kilometres of land was reclaimed to construct Bordesley urban village, consisting of over 1,000 homes, a school and numerous community facilities. It was thought to be the largest urban village of its kind in the country. Other developments include the development of the Fort Shopping Centre near Fort Dunlop and reclamation of the 'Star' site, which was formerly occupied by the Nechells Power Station, by the M6 motorway and A38. The 140,000 square metre site was redeveloped to create the Star City retail development with the help of a £6.8 million government grant.

During its lifetime, 3,400,000 square feet (320,000 m^{2}) of non-housing development and 802 housing units were built. Around 4,656 new jobs were created and some £211m of private finance was leveraged in. Circa 341 acres (1.38 km^{2}) of derelict land was reclaimed and 30 miles (48 km) of new road and footpaths put in place. The chairman was Sir Reginald Eyre and the Chief executive was Alan Osborne and, subsequently, Jim Beeston. It was dissolved in 1998.
