= London Resort =

Formerly proposed theme park in Kent, United Kingdom

The London Resort
- Previously known as: Paramount Kent; Paramount Pictures Theme Park

- Original artist impression
- Interactive map of The London Resort
- Location: Swanscombe, Kent, England
- Coordinates: 51.4617°N 0.3117°E
- Owner: London Resort Company Holdings (In Liquidation)
- Theme: British culture
- Operating season: Year-round
- Area: 465 hectares (4.65 km^{2}; 1,150 acres)
- Website: londonresort.info (archived)

The London Resort, originally known as the London Paramount Entertainment Resort, was a proposed theme park and resort in the Borough of Dartford in Kent, first announced on 8 October 2012. The complex was renamed to London Resort in 2017, after Paramount Studios withdrew its support for the project.

In March 2022, the application for the resort was officially withdrawn following concerns raised by Natural England, and issues with the free port status of Tilbury. The company announced its intention to scale back plans and to resubmit an application the following year. London Resort Company Holdings went into administration in March 2023. The project was largely backed by Abdulla Al-Humaidi, who also served as director until his own bankruptcy in 2023. Some doubted that the resort would ever be built.

In 2023, Paramount sued London Resort Company Holdings, alleging that the restructuring implemented earlier that year was unfair and featured irregularities.

== Plan ==
At the 2012 launch of the project it was announced that the complex would feature Europe's largest indoor water park, theatres, live music venues, attractions, cinemas, restaurants, event space and hotels. Allied to the project would be a training academy for the entertainment and hospitality sectors, a new country park, a large science and education visitor complex and "the biggest performing arts centre in Europe". With an initial completion date announced for 2019, the park and related enterprises were expected to employ 27,000 people. Plans were since reviewed and revised, with the London Resort announcing its intention to open in 2024. Considerable uncertainty as to when the planning application would be made lingered, and the appointed Examining Authority was increasingly critical of the lack of progress made by the LRCH in updating documents ahead of the examination.

The park was initially planned in partnership with Paramount Pictures, and would have been known as the London Paramount Entertainment Resort, with the park's theme having an emphasis on Britain and Kent, as well as Paramount films and entertainment properties. The team at the Resort subsequently agreed with Paramount to separate in 2017, and the project became known as the London Resort.

In 2019, a licensing agreement was reached with Paramount Studios which would allow London Resort to use their Intellectual Property in rides.

Following meetings between representatives of the project and government ministers (George Osborne, Bob Neill, Brandon Lewis and Kris Hopkins), it became the first commercial venture to be awarded nationally significant infrastructure project status, allowing the developers to bypass local planning requirements.

In 2014, it was hoped that the park would spur the development of a new Garden City development at nearby Ebbsfleet.

A ferry terminal was proposed on Swanscombe Peninsula to bring visitors from another new terminal in Tilbury, Essex.

The cost of the development was estimated at £3.5 billion in 2017, although it was not clear how – and from whom – this funding would be provided. The Funding Statement submitted with the planning application says that “investors to fund the equity and debt financing have been identified but have chosen to remain confidential at present”.

=== Process ===
A Development Consent Order (DCO) application was submitted on 31 December 2020. It was originally envisaged that the Examination of the application would get underway in April 2021, but the applicant (LRCH) then asked for an additional four months to submit updates, following a decision by Natural England to designate much of the development area as a Site of Special Scientific Interest (SSSI).

There were further delays and extensions, and in December 2021 the Examining Authority (at the Planning Inspectorate) launched a consultation (until 24 January 2022) with the applicant and interested parties (which includes objectors), asking whether an ongoing delay to the commencement of this Examination as requested by the applicant (LRCH) remains justified, appropriate and in the public interest. The Examining Authority signalled that if the delay was curtailed, it could proceed directly to examine the application as currently before it, commencing in March 2022. LRCH's option on the majority of the land needed for the development expired in December 2022, according to the accounts of owners Swanscombe Development LLP.

On 29 March 2022, plans were officially withdrawn, citing Natural England's concerns and issues with the classification of Tilbury as a free port. Chief executive PY Gerbeau announced the company's intention to submit fresh plans before the end of the year.

In December 2022 it was announced that the plans for the park had been scaled back and that PY Gerbeau would step down as CEO and that the plans for the resort would be resubmitted in 2023. In March 2023, LRCH went into administration, and said they were going to resubmit plans, although this has yet to happen. In November, Paramount sued LRCH, and nothing else about the project has come since. On 27 June 2024, Swanscombe Development LLP was listed for sale and thus the land for The London Resort itself along with it. In December 2024, the High Court confirmed that the company behind the resort had ceased to trade and ordered that a petition be presented for its winding-up. In January 2025, a High Court judge ordered the company be wound up.

== Attractions ==
The themed lands planned for the park included:

- Starport
- The Jungle
- The Isles
- The Kingdom
- The Woods
- The Studio
- High Street

In April 2021, a dinosaur-themed "Base Camp" land was announced, featuring:

- A triple launched roller coaster exceeding 70 mph and 1 km of track based on the Quetzalcoatlus
- A family orientated roller coaster
- An indoor 1500 seat show arena
- A motion-based 4D dark ride themed to water-based dinosaurs
- An interactive dark ride where guests track and tag dinosaurs using "sophisticated gaming technology"
- Play areas, excavation sites and ziplines
- Two food and beverage locations, one celebrating the life and legacy of Mary Anning and the other an underwater restaurant

Paramount Pictures was attached to the proposal, with the intention of showcasing Hollywood and British culture. Several companies that planned to support the project but later backed out include Aardman Animations, the British Film Institute, the BBC, and ITV. The latter two backed out of the project in February 2022, after reports that the endangered Attulus distinguendus species of spider, better known as the distinguished jumping spider, was discovered to be living on the site.

Other rides and attractions that were expected to be based on Paramount blockbusters were Mission: Impossible, The Italian Job and A Quiet Place. It was confirmed that 70% of the parks attractions would be indoors due to England's weather conditions, allowing year-round operation.

BBC Worldwide productions expected to feature in the theme park were Doctor Who, Sherlock and Top Gear Rides and attractions that would have also been featured included the ITV children's programmes Thunderbirds Are Go and Robozuna.

=== Development ===
The site, which is not in London, straddled the border of the Dartford and Gravesham boroughs and both authorities had previously pledged their support. Dartford Borough Council has since published its preference for an alternative proposal for the site, with a scheme incorporating “lower density, mixed uses and ecological improvements”, instead of London Resort.

In April 2013 newspaper reports claimed development may be delayed by the discovery of a rare species of spider. Sefton pledged to remove the colony of distinguished jumping spiders (Attulus distinguendus) to another suitable site.

The following month, the Kent Messenger reported that plans for the theme park could be endangered if a new Lower Thames Crossing was sited over the Swanscombe Peninsula and quoted Sefton: "It could really scupper plans. We are in the final throes of negotiating a very large investment and this makes it very difficult." The proposal was rejected that December.

In June 2020, further details were released outlining the steps being taken in preparation for submitting planning permission in late 2020, with public consultations scheduled for Q3 2020. An environmental report was also submitted in June 2020.

On 31 December 2020, LRCH submitted its Development Consent Order (DCO) planning application to the Government, via the Planning Inspectorate. On 28 January 2021, LRCH were advised that the application had been accepted for examination. This was followed on 19 February by an invitation for interested parties to register their interest in the application, up until 31 March. A public inquiry was expected to take up to a year and a half. In the absence of any further delays, Sky News reported it would lead to the first gate opening in 2024. In March that year, Natural England listed much of the proposed site as a Site of Special Scientific Interest in view of its diverse insect life. This led to a significant delay to the progress of the application.

On 29 March 2022, the plans were officially withdrawn, with the intention of resubmitting them in 2023. In March 2023, London Resort Company Holdings went into administration.

On 17 January 2025, LRCH was issued a winding up order by the High Court, a month after a judge deemed it had breached a payment agreement with its creditors. A spokesman for LRCH said: "The dream of the London Resort has been ended by the courts." On 13 March 2025, LRCH entered liquidation.

== Resorts ==
In August 2019, LRCH announced a partnership with Radisson Hotels to build a 430-room hotel within the resort. In the environmental scoping report published in June 2020, it was detailed that the park intends to build four hotels in addition to the theme parks, totalling approximately 3550 rooms, with 2500 rooms available for the first park. The plan also revealed a proposed 3000 seat convention/conference centre, an eSports arena and a number of indoor and outdoor theatres.

== Reactions ==
The project received mixed responses within Kent. A commentary in the London Evening Standard in October 2012 called into question the commitment of some of the development partners, namely landowner Lafarge Tarmac, builder Brookfield Construction and property company Development Securities. In December 2012 the project secured the services of Chris Townsend as its commercial director. Townsend performed the same role for the London Organising Committee of the Olympic and Paralympic Games on behalf of the London 2012 Summer Olympics and was charged with attracting investors for debt and equity funding.

In September 2020, the conservation charity Buglife began a campaign to save the Swanscombe Peninsula from development and to have the site designated as a Site of Special Scientific Interest. Buglife described the peninsula as “a brownfield of the highest quality for wildlife, as well as a valued community space for walking, bird watching, angling and escaping the hustle and bustle of North Kent”. In March 2021, Natural England designated the Swanscombe Peninsula as a SSSI for nationally important invertebrates, breeding birds, plants and geology. This designation was subject to a four-month period (until 12 July 2021) in which anyone could make representations or object to the notification. Following the ending of the representation period, London Resort Company Holdings announced that they had objected to the designation, and accused Natural England of seeking to frustrate their planning application. In response, Buglife described the objection as a "transparent PR effort that misrepresents the data of London Resort's own wildlife surveys". Natural England subsequently told the BBC that said it would try to address the concerns raised in a "small number of objections". On 10 November 2021, Natural England's Board met, and decided to confirm the SSSI designation. In doing so, it disregarded LRCH's objections to the SSSI, with the board papers making clear that only very minor adjustments would be made to the boundary.

On 24 November, LRCH's Chief Executive wrote to the Planning Inspectorate, describing Natural England's decision as erroneous, before announcing “subtle changes” to the design of the project in response to the SSSI designation. The Chief Executive also set out their “off-site ecological compensation strategy is being reframed to directly account for SSSI impacts”. Natural England responded that “[off-site] compensation cannot adequately address the harm that would result to the SSSI from the development proposal, as the feasibility of doing this is considered low and very unlikely to offer an equivalent assemblage and richness of species”.

The Thames Crossing Action Group, who represent those opposed to the proposed Lower Thames Crossing, have voiced concerns over traffic issues that would be generated by the London Resort. Similar concerns have also been voiced about traffic and transport by Transport for London, Network Rail, and local Government leaders.

Writing in 2021, local newspapers News Shopper and Kent Live both queried whether the resort would ever open, given the extensive delays and lack of progress.

On 23 November 2021, a number of existing local businesses wrote – along with the Save Swanscombe Peninsula campaign – to the Planning Inspectorate, challenging the approach which had been taken in granting the applicant (LRCH) a series of extensions, contrary to Government Guidance. The letter set out a series of concerns, including how the uncertainty was blighting the 100+ businesses operating in the shadow of compulsory acquisition, before going on to ask the Examining Authority to take urgent action to prevent delay of the examination beyond April 2022. It was following receipt of this letter which the Examining Authority decided to launch a consultation with the applicant and interested parties on about whether the examination of the application should continue to be delayed. The Examining Authority was critical of LRCH's approach to providing information and said that the applicant's conduct was a relevant consideration for what happens next.

In March 2022, Dartford MP Gareth Johnson withdrew his support for the London Resort, citing LRCH's failure to engage with local residents and the impact the resort would have on traffic and wildlife. Interviewed in April 2023, he said he considered the project to be "dead in the water".

== See also ==
- Swanscombe Peninsula
- Universal Studios Great Britain
- Legoland Windsor Resort
