= Listed buildings in Swanscombe and Greenhithe =

Civil Parish in Kent, England

Swanscombe and Greenhithe is a village and civil parish in the Borough of Dartford of Kent, England. It contains one grade I, one grade II* and 28 grade II listed buildings that are recorded in the National Heritage List for England.

This list is based on the information retrieved online from Historic England.

== Key ==
Grade	Criteria
I	Buildings that are of exceptional interest
II*	Particularly important buildings of more than special interest
II	Buildings that are of special interest

== Listing ==
Name	Grade	Location	Type	Completed (Note: The date given is the date used by Historic England as significant for the initial building or that of an important part in the structure's description.)	Date designated	Grid ref. (Note: The grid reference is based on the British national grid reference system, sometimes known as OSGB36, used by the Ordnance Survey.) Geo-coordinates	Notes	Entry number (Note: The "List Entry Number" is a unique number assigned to each listed building and scheduled monument by Historic England.)	Image	Wikidata
Former Church of All Saints	II*	Church Of All Saints, Galley Hill Road, Swanscombe, DA10 0LF			17 March 1982	TQ6057474841; 51°26′59″N 0°18′34″E		1085781	Former Church of All Saints More images	Q17557307
Wall, Gate Piers and Railings to Ingress Abbey Fronting London Road and Turning Into the Avenue	II	Gate Piers And Railings To Ingress Abbey Fronting London Road And Turning Into The Avenue, London Road, Greenhithe			17 March 1982	TQ5891774821; 51°27′00″N 0°17′08″E		1085786	Upload Photo	Q26374284
Churchyard Wall, Gates and Gatepiers to North of Church of St Peter and St Paul, Fronting Swanscombe Street and Small Section to Manor Road	II	Gates And Gatepiers To North Of Church Of St Peter And St Paul, Fronting Swanscombe Street And Small Section To Manor Road, Manor Road			17 March 1982	TQ6046574003; 51°26′32″N 0°18′27″E		1101457	Upload Photo	Q26394902
Brick Lined Tunnel at Ingress Abbey	II	Greenhithe			6 November 1998	TQ5936375046; 51°27′07″N 0°17′32″E		1245694	Upload Photo	Q26538201
Flint Cave in the Grounds of Ingress Abbey at Tq 5898 5904	II	Greenhithe			8 October 1997	TQ5899574884; 51°27′02″N 0°17′12″E		1362092	Upload Photo	Q26644022
Flint Walled Garden Tunnel at Ingress Abbey	II	Greenhithe			6 November 1998	TQ5928774967; 51°27′05″N 0°17′28″E		1245695	Upload Photo	Q26538202
Lovers Arch in the Grounds of Ingress Abbey at Tq 593 750	II	Greenhithe			8 October 1997	TQ5918075003; 51°27′06″N 0°17′22″E		1362091	Upload Photo	Q26644021
The Cave of the Seven Heads in the Grounds of Ingress Abbey at Tq 5898 7508	II	Greenhithe			8 October 1997	TQ5899674925; 51°27′04″N 0°17′13″E		1362088	Upload Photo	Q26644018
The Grange (including Attached Tunnels and Garden Arch) in the Grounds of Ingress Abbey at Tq 592 750	II	Greenhithe			8 October 1997	TQ5915174950; 51°27′04″N 0°17′21″E		1362089	Upload Photo	Q26644019
The Monks Well in the Grounds of Ingress Abbey at Tq 592 750	II	Greenhithe			8 October 1997	TQ5918474983; 51°27′05″N 0°17′22″E		1362090	Upload Photo	Q26644020
17, 19 and 21, High Street	II	17, 19 and 21, High Street, Greenhithe			17 March 1982	TQ5873475131; 51°27′10″N 0°16′59″E		1085782	Upload Photo	Q26374263
18, High Street	II	18, High Street, Greenhithe			3 May 1971	TQ5879375163; 51°27′11″N 0°17′02″E		1085784	Upload Photo	Q26374275
28-34, High Street	II	28-34, High Street, Greenhithe			17 March 1982	TQ5876175158; 51°27′11″N 0°17′01″E		1347920	Upload Photo	Q26631339
45 and 47, High Street	II	45 and 47, High Street, Greenhithe			4 September 1975	TQ5862775143; 51°27′11″N 0°16′54″E		1101552	Upload Photo	Q26395100
Octagonal Tower in the Grounds of the Warren	II	High Street, Greenhithe			17 June 1999	TQ5868275097; 51°27′09″N 0°16′57″E		1387303	Upload Photo	Q26666962
Origin and Berberry Cottage	II	16, High Street, Greenhithe			17 March 1982	TQ5880275163; 51°27′11″N 0°17′03″E		1101544	Upload Photo	Q26395085
Sir John Franklin	II	High Street, Greenhithe, DA9 9NN			17 March 1982	TQ5863075169; 51°27′12″N 0°16′54″E		1085785	Upload Photo	Q26374280
The Woodlands	II	79, High Street, Greenhithe			5 May 1952	TQ5847175102; 51°27′10″N 0°16′46″E		1085783	Upload Photo	Q26374268
Walmer	II	High Street, Greenhithe			5 May 1952	TQ5885175144; 51°27′11″N 0°17′05″E		1100633	Upload Photo	Q26393144
Boundary Stone, Ingress Park, Lovers Lane	II	Ingress Park, Off Lover's Lane			3 October 2012	TQ5950975336; 51°27′16″N 0°17′40″E		1410237	Upload Photo	Q26676150
Garden Bridge, Ingress Park	II	Ingress Park, Off Lover's Lane			3 October 2012	TQ5949275229; 51°27′13″N 0°17′39″E		1410227	Upload Photo	Q26676149
1, Knockhall Road	II	1, Knockhall Road			17 March 1982	TQ5960974872; 51°27′01″N 0°17′44″E		1101524	Upload Photo	Q26395035
Church of St Mary	II	London Road, Greenhithe			17 March 1982	TQ5856974660; 51°26′55″N 0°16′50″E		1085787	Church of St Mary More images	Q26374290
Milestone Situated at Junction with Knockhall Chase	II	London Road, Greenhithe			17 March 1982	TQ5891074807; 51°27′00″N 0°17′08″E		1101504	Upload Photo	Q26394998
Parish Church of St Peter and St Paul	I	Manor Road			5 May 1952	TQ6046373986; 51°26′32″N 0°18′27″E		1085788	Parish Church of St Peter and St Paul More images	Q17529662
K6 Telephone Kiosk	II	Pier Road			2 December 1987	TQ5883775193; 51°27′12″N 0°17′05″E		1262792	Upload Photo	Q26553644
Ingress Abbey	II	The Avenue, Greenhithe			2 October 1970	TQ5914375055; 51°27′08″N 0°17′20″E		1085779	Ingress Abbey More images	Q15228687
Lodge to Ingress Abbey	II	The Avenue, Greenhithe			17 March 1982	TQ5890774830; 51°27′01″N 0°17′08″E		1336476	Upload Photo	Q26620966
Stable Block to East of Ingress Abbey	II	The Avenue, Greenhithe			17 March 1982	TQ5918775046; 51°27′07″N 0°17′23″E		1085780	Upload Photo	Q26374257
Terrace Wall to North of Ingress Abbey	II	The Avenue, Greenhithe			17 March 1982	TQ5913975071; 51°27′08″N 0°17′20″E		1336475	Upload Photo	Q26620965

== See also ==
- Grade I listed buildings in Kent
- Grade II* listed buildings in Kent

== Sources ==
- Newman, John (2012) [1969], Kent: West and the Weald, The Buildings of England, New Haven and London: Yale University Press, ISBN 978-0-300-18509-6
