= Kate Gerbeau =

British television presenter

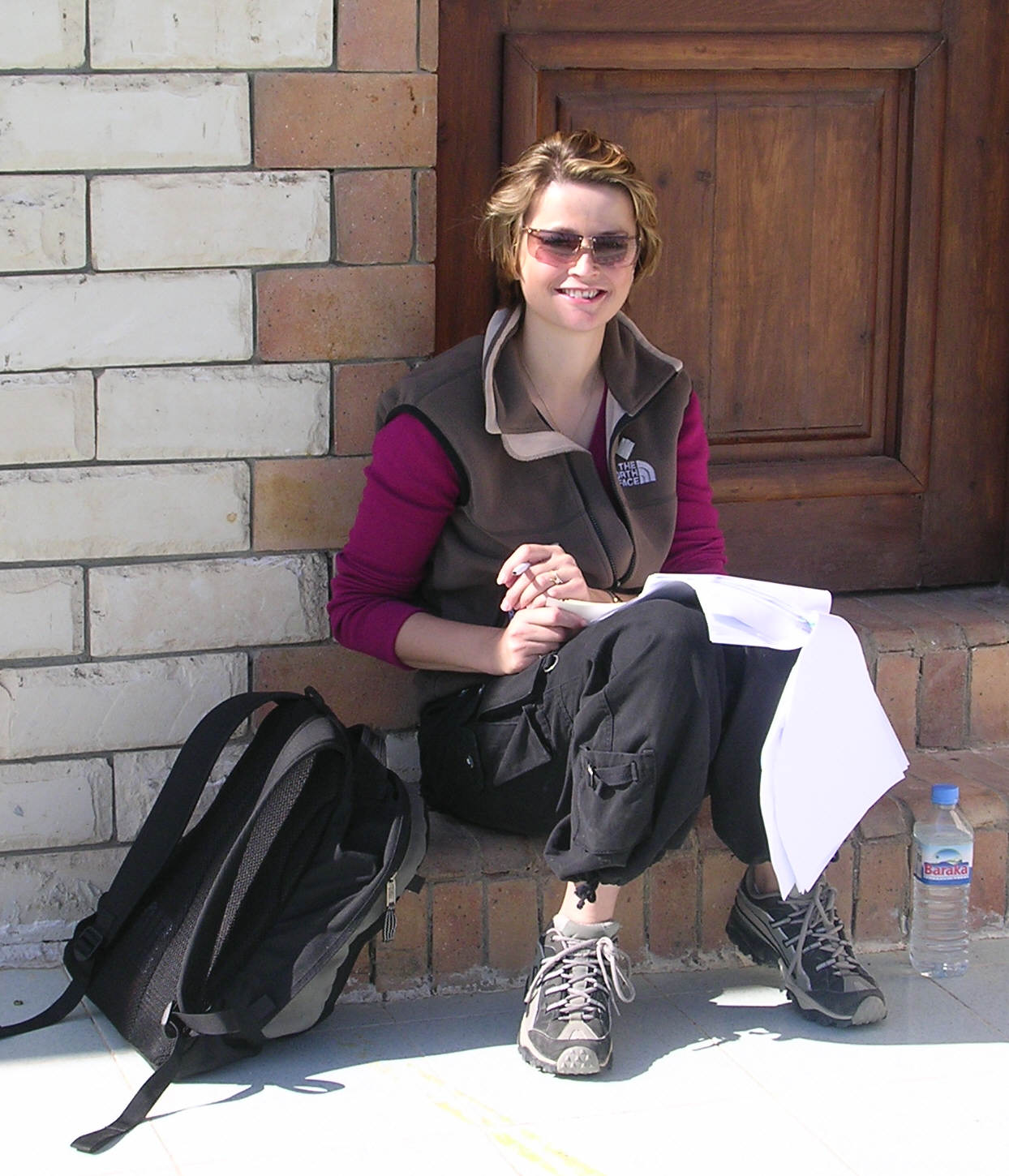
- Born: Kate Sanderson; 9 August 1968 (age 57); Sutton Coldfield, Birmingham, England
- Occupation(s): Presenter, Newsreader
- Years active: 1991–present
- Notable credit(s): Newsround; BBC Breakfast; Watchdog; Five News; British Forces News
- Spouse: Pierre-Yves Gerbeau (m. 2005)

Kate Gerbeau (née Sanderson) is an English television presenter and news reader, currently on Times Radio.

== Education ==
Gerbeau went to school in Formby and graduated from Bristol University with a BA in French and German.

== Career ==
Gerbeau was born 9 August 1968 in Sutton Coldfield, Birmingham. She started her television career as a presenter on HTV West. From 1997-2001, she presented Newsround; after leaving this post, she presented Watchdog with Nicky Campbell. She was famously impersonated by Ronni Ancona on The Big Impression. Gerbeau left Watchdog in 2004. She also presented The Heaven and Earth Show. Gerbeau was also a newsreader on BBC Breakfast and also presented the news on Breakfast with Frost. Kate also presented CBBC show Against All Odds, which, like BBC One show 999, showed reconstructions of real life emergencies and gave First Aid advice.

In December 2004 she joined Five, and co-presented the two-hour long Golden Mummy Tomb Opening Live with Guy de la Bédoyère from Bahariya in Egypt's Western Desert, featuring the Egyptian archaeologist Zahi Hawass. She was a newsreader on Five News, until the birth of her daughter.

In July 2008 Gerbeau presented a documentary TV series on Five – Wild Animal ER – about Tiggywinkles, the animal welfare charity and veterinary hospital.

February 2010 saw Kate taking a new role as presenter of BFBS TV's weekday evening news programme British Forces News.

In 2019-2020 Kate worked with Slater and Gordon Lawyers on a series of podcasts exploring the stories of those who have gone through the civil justice system, and the legal teams who supported them through it.

Since March 2023, she has been the presenter of Frontline on Times Radio, as well as on its YouTube channel.

== Personal life ==
She had a relationship with television presenter Krishnan Guru-Murthy. She married entrepreneur businessman Pierre-Yves Gerbeau in 2005. Together they had a child, Chloé Gerbeau.
