= Chris Townsend (businessman) =

Christopher Peter Townsend CBE was a senior partner and Head of KPMG's Infrastructure, Government, Defence and Healthcare (IGH) practice. He was previously the Commercial Director of Chelsea F.C. and London Resort. Since 2019, he has been an independent Trustee of the National Portrait Gallery, London, where he chairs the gallery's Trading Company. In April 2020, during Phase 1 of the COVID-19 pandemic, he accepted the role of Chief Executive of the government's Shielding Programme on a voluntary basis for 4 months before joining KPMG.

== Career ==
In 1986, Townsend was hired as a board director by DMB&B a worldwide top five advertising agency, before becoming joint managing director of the firm. He entered the world of multichannel television in 1990, becoming marketing director at BBC Enterprises, advising on subscription channels.

Townsend joined BSkyB as customer marketing director in April 1992 and was responsible for all customer marketing including subscriber acquisition and retention generating 90% BSkyB revenues. Townsend launched Sky's Pay TV channel which included Sky Sports & Sky Movies, and was responsible for expanding Sky's customer base from 250,000 to 3.5 million customers. In 1992, he launched the Premier League on the Sky Sports Pay TV Channel. In 1995, Townsend was promoted to marketing director of BSkyB. He went on to develop and implement the Sky digital marketing strategy, Sky Interactive and the Sky Electronic Programme Guide, which he personally patented. His involvement with Sky Interactive resulted in considerable commercial deals exceeding £500 million.

Townsend joined Telewest in July 1999, taking up the newly created role of director of interactive services. While at Telewest, Townsend was responsible for developing the company's digital TV services and negotiating all commercial contracts for content distributed on Cable Digital TV and Blueyonder Broadband networks to 3.5 million Telewest homes.

In April 2003, Transport for London (TfL) appointed Townsend as group marketing director. He led the highly successful launch and marketing of the Oyster card and also played a key role in securing the £10 billion investment from Government for the upgrade of the TFL Underground, Rail, and Bus Networks. His responsibilities included all marketing across the TfL transport network, including the Congestion Charge and the London Underground (LU) network to London's 8 million residents. During his directorship at TfL, he negotiated all advertising and sponsorship revenue contracts, including an 8-year £800 million deal with Viacom for the Underground advertising contract.

=== 2012 Olympic Games ===
Townsend was part of the successful London 2012 Olympic bid team in his previous role as Marketing Director at Transport for London (TfL). The Chairman of the London 2012 Olympic bid, Sir Keith Mills, encouraged Townsend to apply for the Commercial Director role.

In June 2006, Townsend was appointed as Commercial Director by the London 2012 Organising Committee of the Olympic Games. He was responsible for domestic sponsorship, ticket marketing and merchandising of the London 2012 Olympic and Paralympic Games, including the development and management of the London 2012 marketing programme 2006–2010. He also led the negotiation of worldwide broadcast rights and sponsorship for the games with the International Olympic Committee. Townsend had the responsibility for generating £2.4 billion to prepare and stage the Olympic Games in London in 2012. In 2011, portraits of sports stars and the people that helped organise the London 2012 games were unveiled at the National Portrait Gallery, including a photo of Townsend.

=== London Resort ===
In 2012 Townsend became commercial director of the London Resort project, a Paramount Pictures theme park in Kent which was planned to open by 2018.

=== BDUK/DCMS ===
Townsend was appointed CEO of Broadband Delivery UK (BDUK) in January 2014. He oversaw a £1 billion investment in improving broadband internet access and mobile infrastructure, with the ambition to provide super-fast broadband (speeds of 24 Mbit/s or more) for at least 95% of UK premises and universal access to basic broadband (speeds of at least 2 Mbit/s). He managed a Government investment of £150 million to support UK cities to develop the digital infrastructure capability to remain internationally competitive and attractive for investors, business and visitors. The Permanent Secretary at DCMS, Sue Owen, described Townsend' appointment as, "in line with [Treasury minister] Lord Deighton’s review of big government infrastructure projects", which recommended bringing in commercial expertise to fill capability gaps and ensure that key projects are delivered successfully. In February 2015, Townsend announced that BDUK was set to reach its target of 95 percent coverage by 2017, which was achieved by December 2017.

=== Chelsea Football Club ===
In May 2017, Townsend was appointed Commercial Director of Chelsea F.C. following the departure of Christian Purslow. As Commercial Director, Townsend would be responsible for all of Chelsea's commercial programmes, including global sponsorship, ticketing, digital revenues, licensing and merchandise, the two Chelsea F.C hotels, restaurants and catering. Townsend was responsible for developing and launching the ambitious Commercial Strategy 2017–2027.

=== Shielding Programme ===
From April to July 2020, Townsend served as CEO of the Government's Shielding Programme, initially supporting over 1.5 million (later increased to 2.25 million) Clinically Extremely Vulnerable (CEV) patients during the COVID-19 pandemic in England. This was a voluntary unpaid role at the request of the Cabinet Office via John Manzoni, CEO of the Civil Service, during which Townsend stepped back from his post at Chelsea Football Club. Townsend was awarded a CBE in recognition of his services to the Clinically Extremely Vulnerable in her Majesty the Queen's Birthday Honours List in June 2021.

== Honours ==
Townsend was appointed Commander of the Order of the British Empire (CBE) in the 2021 Birthday Honours for services to Clinically Vulnerable People during the COVID-19 response. In February 2013, he was appointed Officer of the Order of the British Empire (OBE) in recognition for services to the London 2012 Olympic and Paralympic Games.

== Personal life ==
Townsend was born in Rhodesia and lived in South Africa before moving to England aged 11. He was educated at a Catholic school in Crawley, West Sussex, during which time he became involved with music band The Cure and was inspired to work in the music industry, joining EMI as a graduate trainee from university. Townsend is also a Trustee and Chair of the Trading Company at the National Portrait Gallery as well as a Trustee and Chair of Digital Committee of the Royal Opera House, advising on commercial, digital and business transformation programmes and projects. Townsend is a keen conservationist and a Member of the Tusk Trust Development Board, of which Prince William, Duke of Cambridge, is the patron. Since 2026 he is a Commissioner for the Commonwealth War Graves Commission.
