= Guildhall, London =

Municipal building in London, England

Guildhall
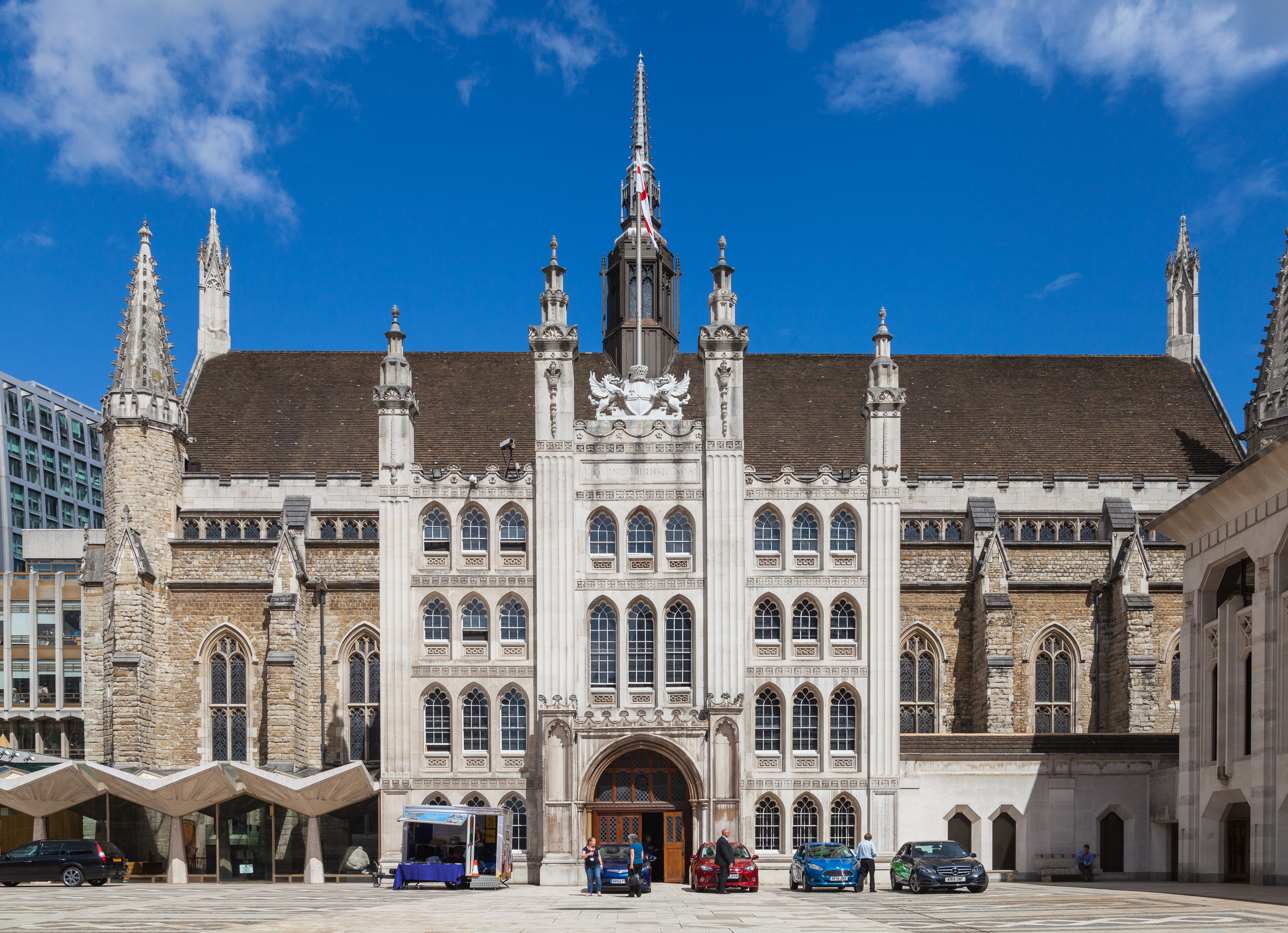
- The façade of Guildhall

- Location within Central London
- Interactive map om Guildhall environs
- 51°30′57″N 0°05′31″W
- Type: Civic building
- Location: Guildhall Yard, EC2V
- OS grid reference: TQ 32485 81384

History
- Built: 1440

Site notes
- Area: City of London
- Owner: City of London Corporation

Listed Building – Grade I
- Official name: Guildhall
- Designated: 4 January 1950
- Reference no.: 1064675

Guildhall is a municipal building in the City of London, England. It is off Gresham and Basinghall streets, in the wards of Bassishaw and Cheap. The current building dates from the 15th century; however documentary evidence suggests that a guildhall had existed at the site since at least the early 12th century. The building has been used as a town hall for several hundred years, and is still the ceremonial and administrative centre of the City of London and its Corporation. It should not be confused with London's City Hall, the administrative centre for Greater London in Canning Town. The term "Guildhall" refers both to the whole building and to its main room, which is a medieval great hall. It is a Grade I-listed building.

== History ==
=== Roman, Anglo-Saxon and Medieval ===
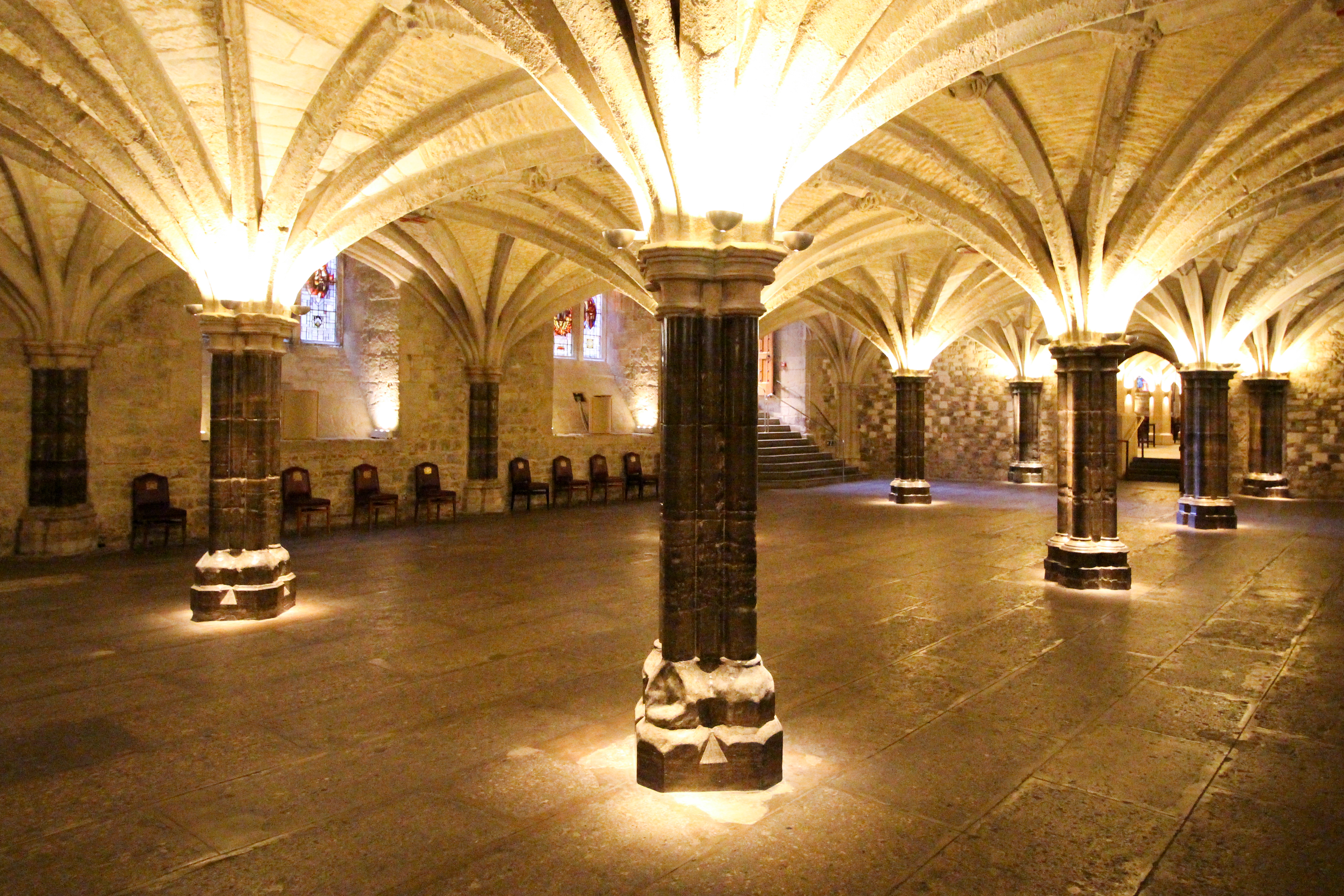
Guildhall crypt

During the Roman period, the Guildhall was the site of the London Roman Amphitheatre, rediscovered as recently as 1988. It was the largest in Roman Britain, partial remains of which are on public display in the basement of the Guildhall Art Gallery, and the outline of whose arena is marked with a black circle on the paving of the courtyard in front of the hall. The siting of the Anglo-Saxon Guildhall here was probably due to the amphitheatre's remains. Excavations by Museum of London Archaeology at the entrance to Guildhall Yard exposed remains of the great 13th-century gatehouse built directly over the southern entrance to the Roman amphitheatre, which raises the possibility that enough of the Roman structure survived to influence the siting not only of the gatehouse and Guildhall itself but also of the church of St Lawrence Jewry whose strange alignment may shadow the elliptical form of the amphitheatre beneath.

The first documentary reference to a London Guildhall is dated 1127 or 1128; archaeologists have also discovered foundations dating to around that time. Legend describes the Guildhall site as being the location of the palace of Brutus of Troy, who according to Geoffrey of Monmouth's Historia Regum Britanniae (1136) is said to have founded a city on the banks of the River Thames, known as Troia Nova, or New Troy.

The great hall is believed to be on a site of an earlier guildhall (one possible derivation for the word "guildhall" is the Anglo-Saxon "gild", meaning payment, with a "gild-hall" being where citizens would pay their taxes). Possible evidence for this derivation may be in a reference to John Parker, the sergeant of "Camera Guyhalde", London, in 1396.

=== Current building ===
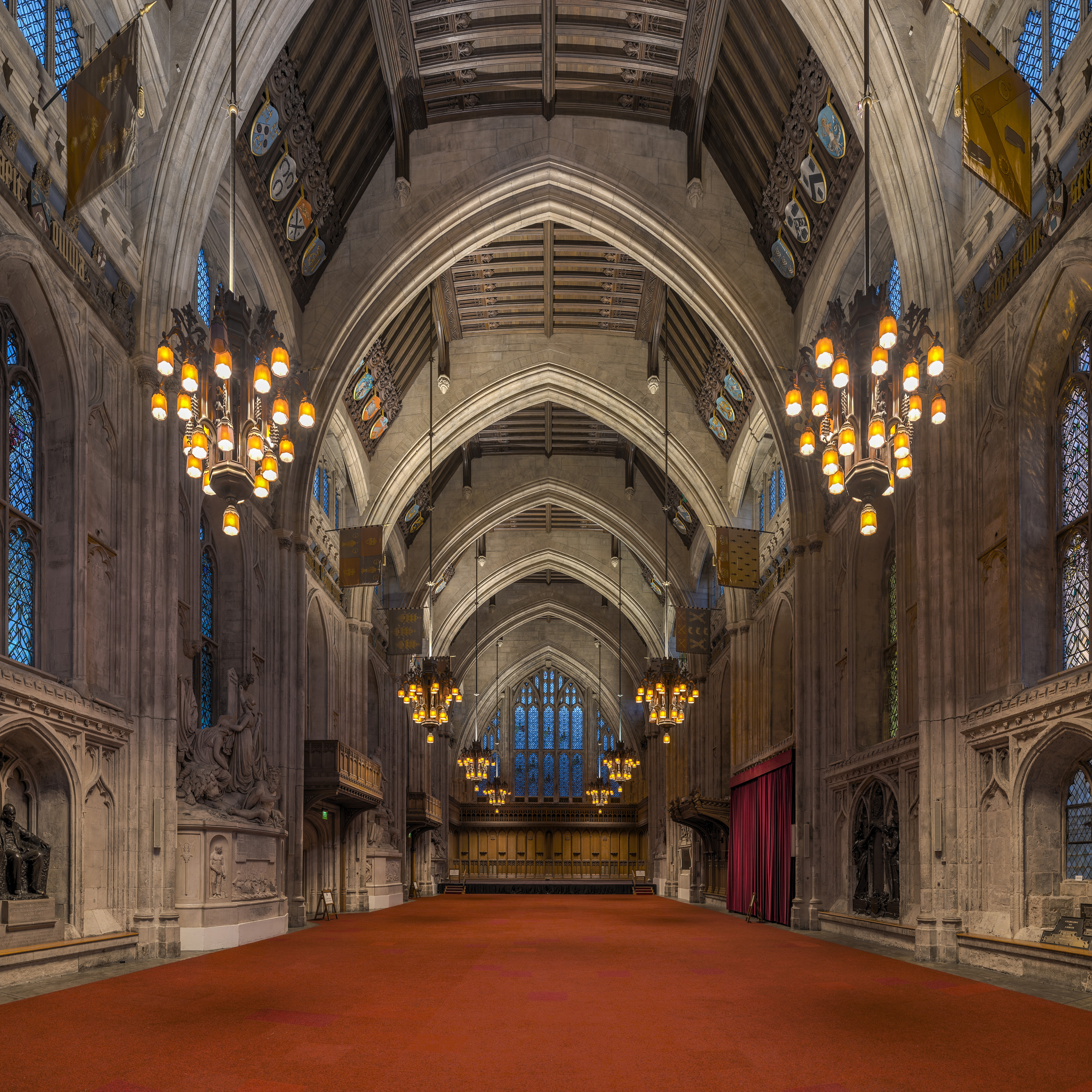
The Great Hall

Construction began on the current building in 1411 and was completed in 1440 under the supervision of John Croxton.

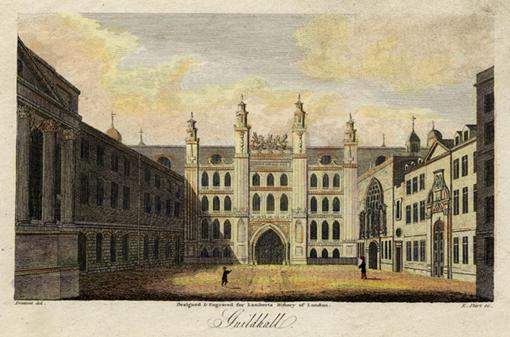
The Guildhall complex in c. 1805. The buildings on the left and right have not survived.

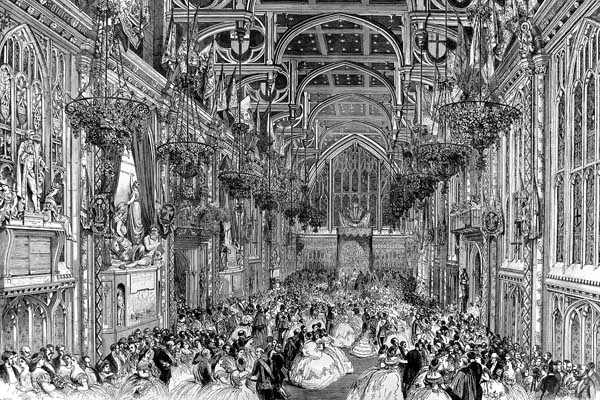
This 1863 gathering at Guildhall was attended by Queen Victoria. The roof shown here has been replaced, but the hammerbeam design was not retained.

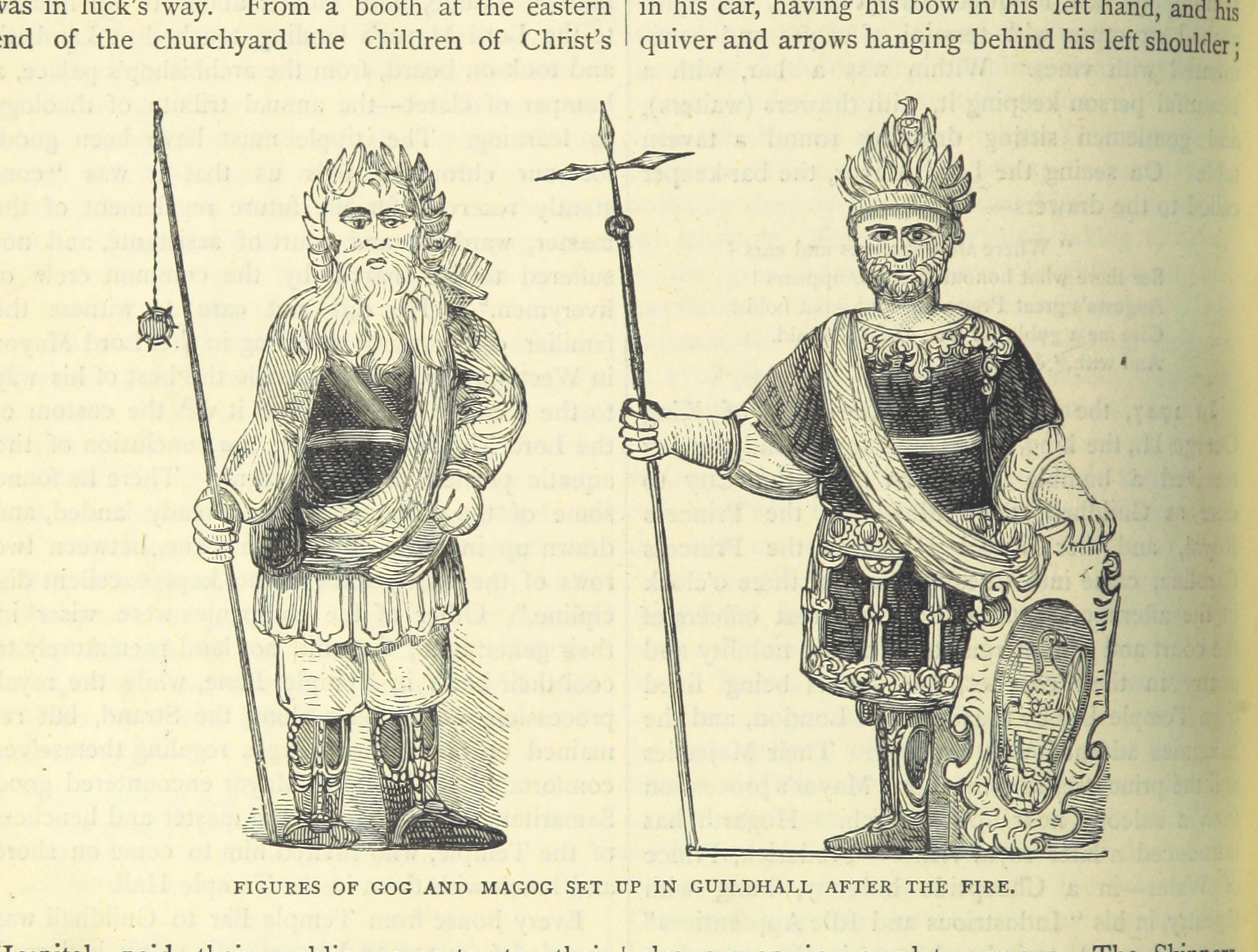
Figures of Gog and Magog set up in Guildhall after the Fire

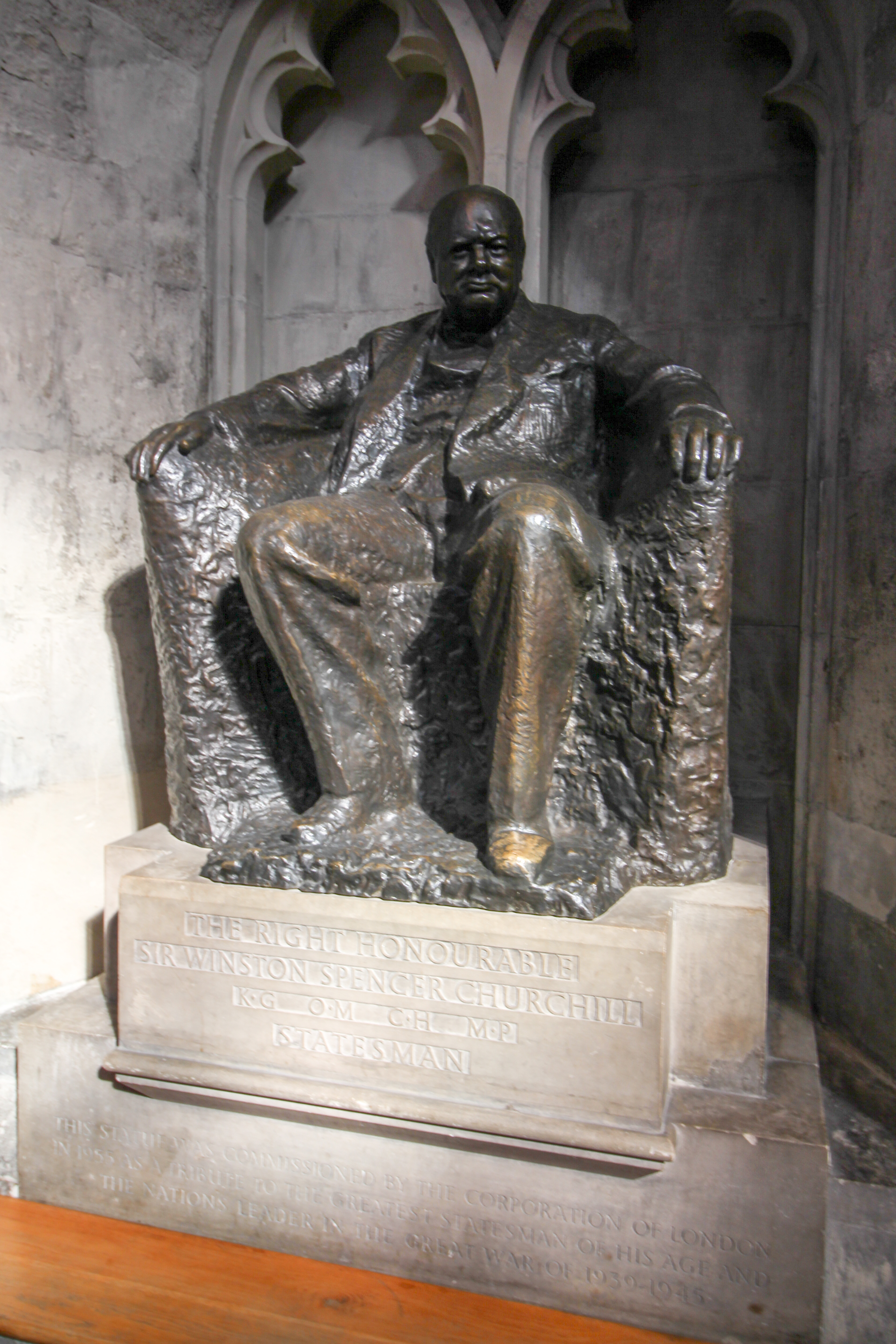
Monument to Winston Churchill, Guildhall, London (sculpted by Oscar Nemon and cast by Martyns)

The Great Hall did not completely escape damage in the Great Fire of London in 1666; it was partially restored (with a flat roof) in 1670. The present grand entrance (the east wing of the south front), in "Hindoostani Gothic", was added in 1788 by George Dance. A more extensive restoration than that in 1670 was completed in 1866 by the City of London architect Sir Horace Jones, who added a new timber roof in close keeping with the original hammerbeam ceiling. This replacement was destroyed during the Second Great Fire of London on the night of 29/30 December 1940, the result of a Luftwaffe fire-raid. It was replaced in 1954 during works designed by Sir Giles Gilbert Scott, though the original hammerbeam design was not retained. The large, seated sculpture of Winston Churchill by Oscar Nemon, which was cast by H. H. Martyn & Co., was unveiled by Churchill in 1955.

Trials at the Guildhall have included those of Anne Askew (the Protestant martyr), Thomas Cranmer (Archbishop of Canterbury) and Lady Jane Grey ("the Nine Days' Queen") as well as Henry Garnet (executed for his complicity in the Gunpowder Plot of 1605).

The 1783 hearing of the infamous Zong case, the outcome of which focused public outrage about the transatlantic slave trade, also took place at Guildhall. On 16 November 1848, the pianist Frédéric Chopin made his last public appearance on a concert platform there. The marathon route of the 2012 Summer Olympics passed through Guildhall Yard.

== Present use ==
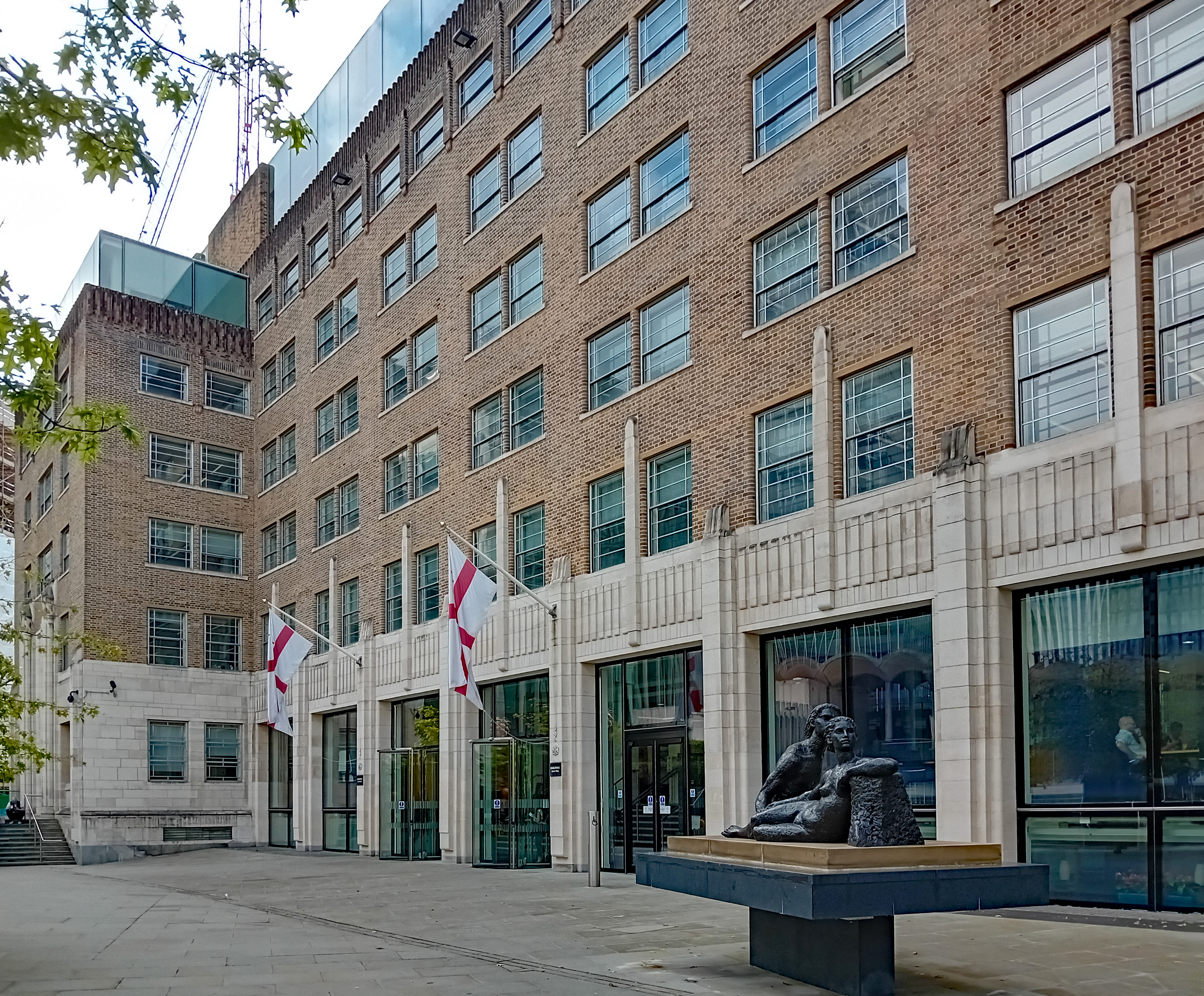
North Wing, completed 1958

Guildhall continues to serve as the headquarters for the City of London Corporation, with most of its offices housed in modern extensions to the north and west of the original building. The North Wing was designed by Giles Gilbert Scott and was built between 1955 and 1958, facing a new public square between Aldermanbury and Basinghall Street.

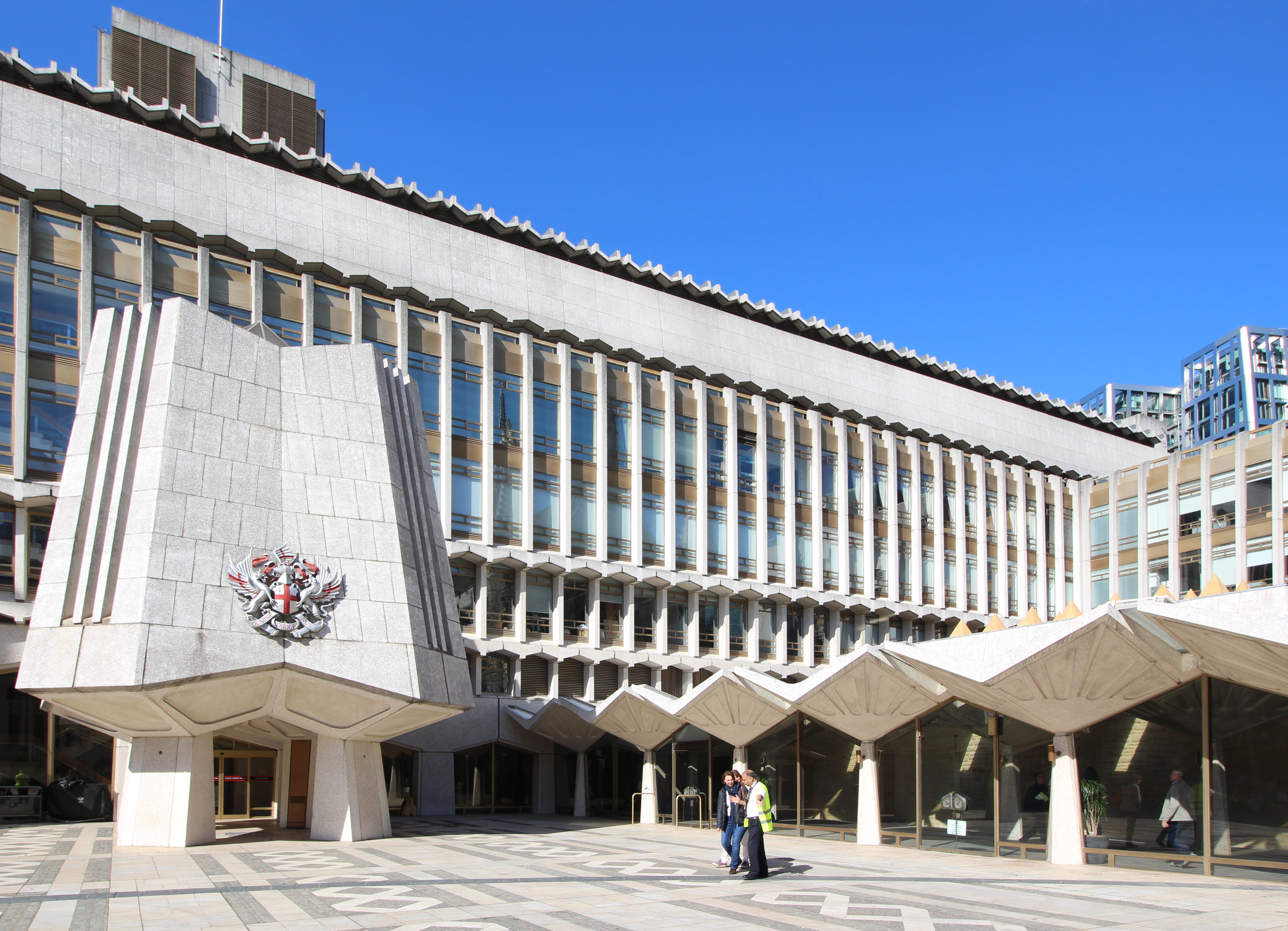
West Wing, completed 1975

The West Wing was designed by Richard Gilbert Scott and built between 1970 and 1975 to a modernist style. The West Wing is separately listed as a Grade II listed building. The older part of Guildhall and the adjacent historic interiors are still used for official functions, and it is open to the public during the annual London Open House weekend. Guildhall Art Gallery was added to the complex in the 1990s. Guildhall Library, a public reference library with specialist collections on London, which include material from the 11th century onwards, is also housed in the complex.

== Gog and Magog ==
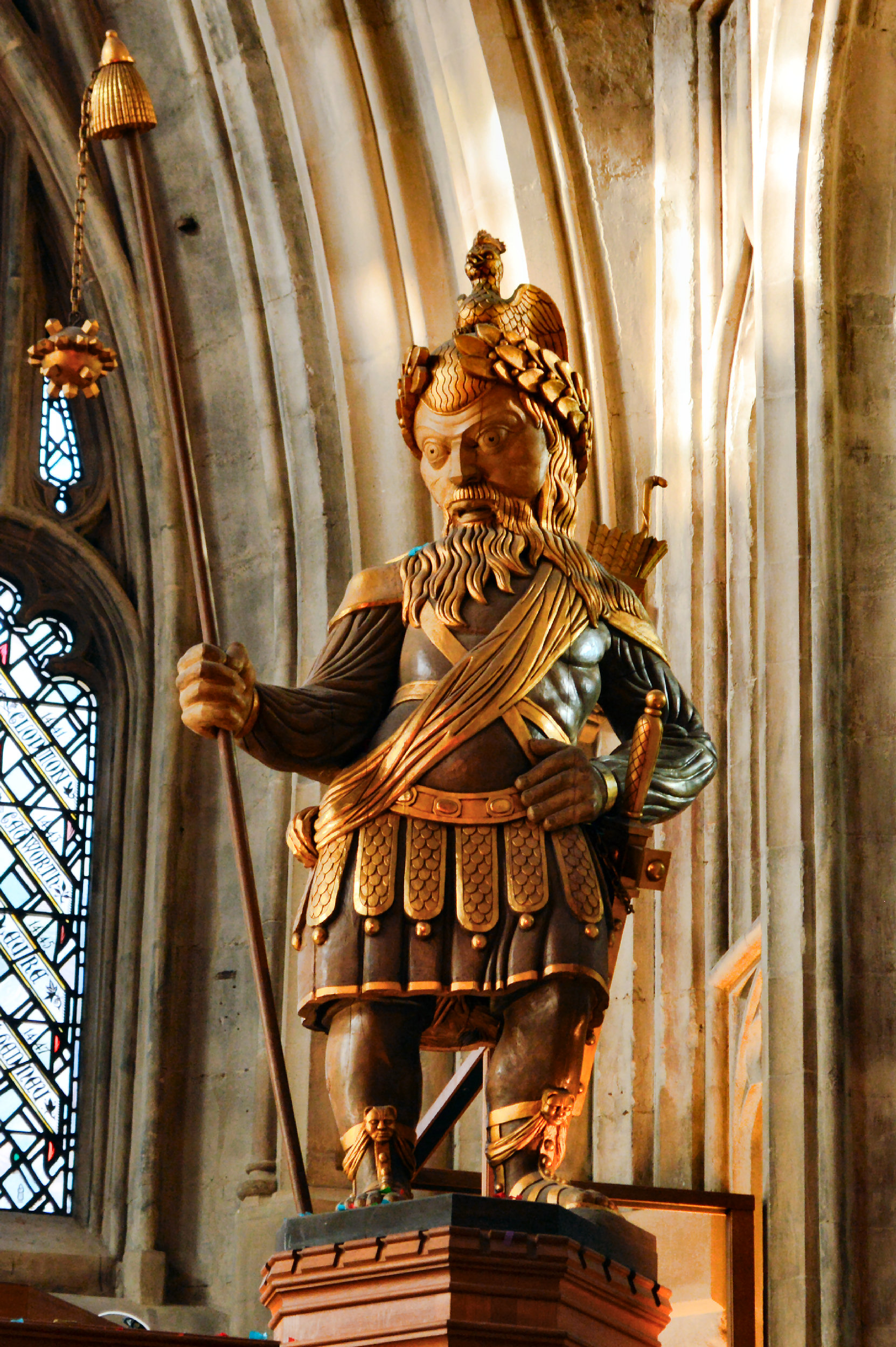
The figure of Magog

Two giants, Gog and Magog, are associated with Guildhall. Legend has it that the two giants were defeated by Brutus and chained to the gates of his palace on the site of Guildhall. Early carvings of Gog and Magog were destroyed in Guildhall during the Great Fire of London. They were replaced in 1708 by a large pair of wooden statues carved by Captain Richard Saunders. These giants, on whom the current versions are based, lasted for more than two hundred years before they were destroyed in the Blitz. They, in turn, were replaced by a new pair carved by David Evans in 1953 and given to the City of London by Alderman Sir George Wilkinson, who had been Lord Mayor in 1940 at the time of the destruction of the previous versions.

== Functions ==
Guildhall hosts many events throughout the year, the most notable one being the Lord Mayor's Banquet, which is held in honour of the immediate-past Lord Mayor and is the first to be hosted by the new Lord Mayor of the City of London. In keeping with tradition, it is at this banquet that the Prime Minister makes a major world affairs speech. One of the last acts of the outgoing Lord Mayor is to present prizes at the City of London School prize day at Guildhall. Other events include those of various law firms and award evenings for the Wine and Spirit Education Trust (WSET). The Worshipful Company of Carmen holds its cart-marking ceremony in the courtyard each July.

In 1992 during the Ruby Jubilee of Elizabeth II, a lunch was held at Guildhall to mark the 40th year of the Queen's reign. Elizabeth II made a famous 'annus horribilis' speech after the 1992 Windsor Castle fire and the separation of two of her children.

== Guildhall Bar ==
The members' bar in the Guildhall is a highly subsidised facility for members of the Court of Common Council and the Court of Aldermen. Access to the facilities is a privilege for life, even after an individual ceases to be a member of either of these courts. Members can also entertain guests there. It is substantially cheaper than any other bar in the City of London, as it is subsidised from the City's Cash, a sovereign wealth fund.

== See also ==
- Guild
- Peterscourt
