= Ebbsfleet Development Corporation =

- Formation: 2015
- Headquarters: Ebbsfleet
- Chair: Simon Dudley
- Chief executive: Ian Piper
- Website: ebbsfleetgardencity.org.uk

Ebbsfleet Development Corporation was established in 2015 to develop land, primarily for housing, in Ebbsfleet Valley, North Kent in England.

== History ==
The corporation was established as part of an initiative by the Chancellor of the Exchequer, George Osborne, in April 2015 during the Cameron–Clegg coalition. As with the development corporations formed in the 1980s, board members are directly appointed by the minister and can override local authority planning controls to spend government money on infrastructure.

Its flagship developments include a development known as Ebbsfleet Central which is to be the commercial centre of Ebbsfleet Garden City. As with earlier garden cities, Ebbsfleet intends to deploy the design concepts developed by the Garden city movement, which involve affordable housing, plentiful green space and low-carbon transport.

The corporation was given a target to persuade housebuilders to deliver 15,000 houses in the designated area. As of March 2020, the corporation had invested £100 million on infrastructure to support the development, but housebuilders had only delivered 2,000 houses in the area. In February 2024, the corporation reported that housebuilders had delivered 4,000 houses in the area, and, in February 2025, it was reported that almost 5,000 houses had been completed.
