= Pierre-Yves Gerbeau =

French businessman

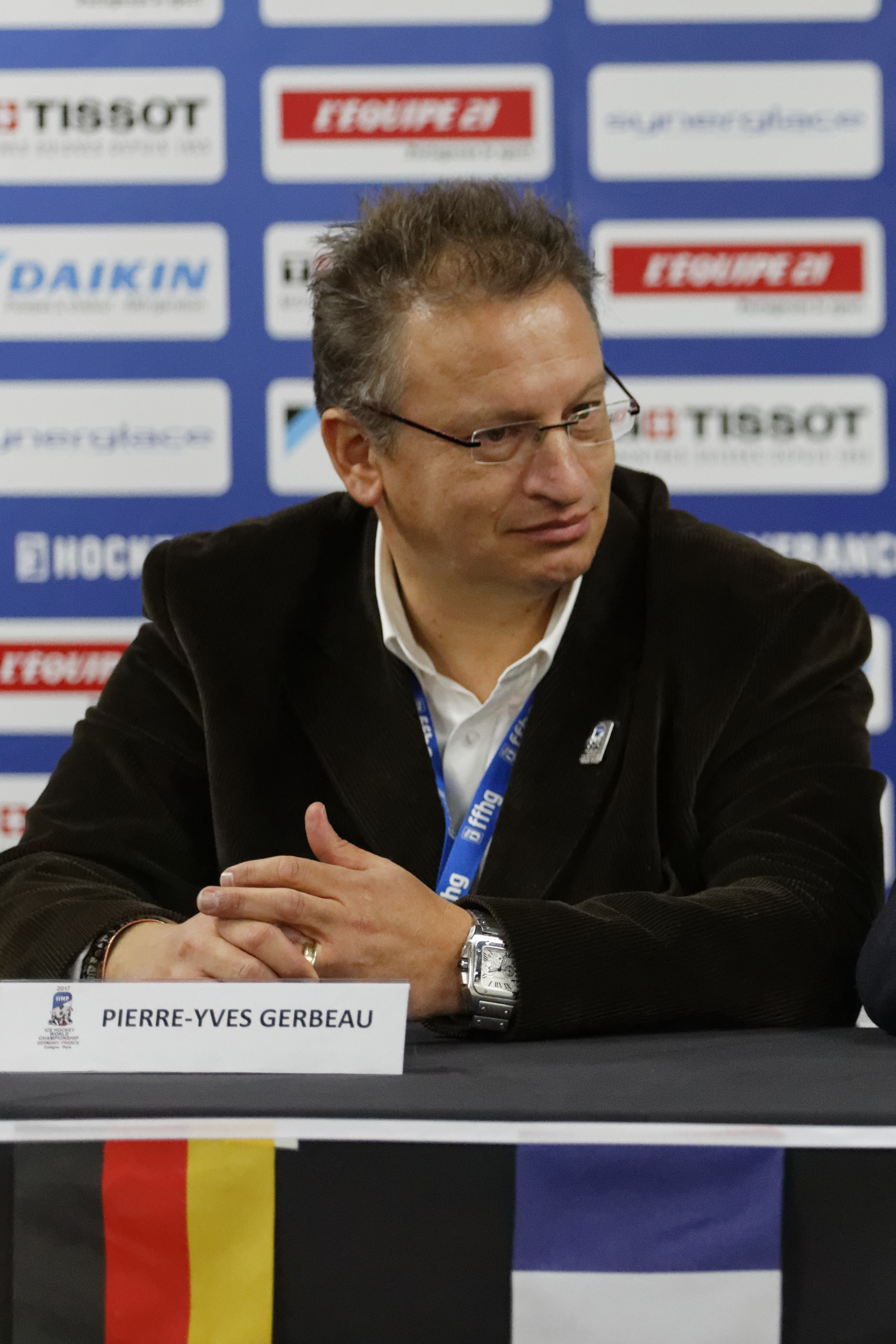
Pierre-Yves Gerbeau in 2014

Pierre-Yves Gerbeau (born 16 October 1965, often shortened to P.Y. Gerbeau) is a French businessman, former ice hockey player, and the current president of the French Ice Hockey Federation.

== Early life ==
Gerbeau was born into an affluent Parisian family, where his parents ran an office supply company. In addition to their house in the 12th arrondissement of Paris, they also had a weekend residence in the Forest of Fontainebleau.

== Sports career ==
Gerbeau started out in 1984 as a professional ice hockey player, playing in several championships and becoming a member of the French national team, before a severe ankle injury curtailed his sports career in 1989. While working in the United Kingdom, Gerbeau kept in touch with the game by playing inline hockey for the South London Snipers in Division 1 of the BIPHA South League.

On an edition of the BBC's Daily Politics show, Gerbeau revealed that he had been suspended from the French Olympic Organisation because he supported London's successful bid for the 2012 Olympic Games instead of the Paris bid.

On 1 October 2021, Gerbeau was appointed president of the French Ice Hockey Federation, replacing Luc Tardif after the latter became president of the International Ice Hockey Federation. He was reelected in June 2022.

== Business career ==
He then turned to business, first with TPS Conseil, then in 1991 joined Euro Disney, rising rapidly to become Vice-President of Park Operations and Attractions in 1997. His responsibilities included ticketing, the safety and maintenance of attractions, and sorting out the queues. He was credited with turning the attraction around after a difficult start. He later left Disney to complete a Master of Business Administration degree at Sciences Po.

On 5 February 2000, Gerbeau was appointed chief executive of the New Millennium Experience Company, the operator of the Millennium Dome in London. His appointment followed the resignation of Jennifer Page after an opening night fiasco and poor attendances in January 2000. He was brought in to turn around the fortunes of an attraction struggling in the face of major financial problems and negative publicity. Whilst in charge, he became known for his enthusiastic and confident personality, and was nicknamed "the Gerbil" by the British press.

Following the closure of the millennium exhibition at the end of 2000, Gerbeau became Chief executive of X-Leisure, operator of the Xscape centres and other leisure facilities.

On 27 June 2019, Gerbeau was appointed chief executive officer of London Resort Company Holdings (LRCH), the owner of the proposed London Resort. He resigned in December 2022, after 3 years serving as its CEO. The LRCH went into administration in March 2023.

== Personal life ==
He is married to Kate Gerbeau (née Sanderson), a British television presenter, and has a daughter (Clémence) from another relationship. He also has a daughter with Kate.

Appearing on the BBC's Question Time on 28 May 2009, Gerbeau declared that he would live in Britain for the rest of his life, jokingly describing France as "a communist country."
