= Peterscourt =

Coordinates: 52°34′27″N 0°14′23″W

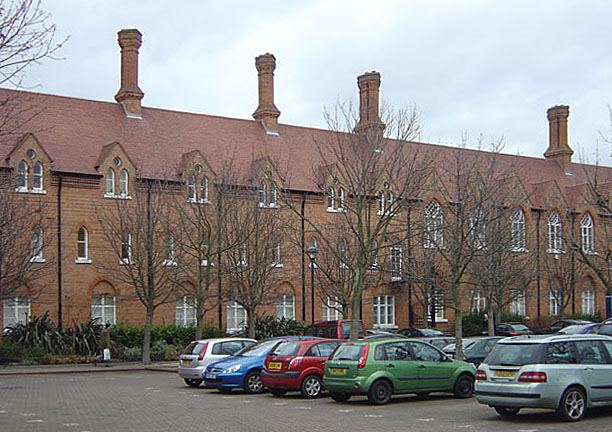
The south façade of Peterscourt in 2008

Peterscourt is a building in Peterborough, on City Road, which was designed by George Gilbert Scott and completed in 1859. It is Grade II listed.

== History ==
The building was designed for, and housed, St Peter's Teacher Training College for men until 1914. From 1921 to 1938 it was a teacher training college for women. During the Second World War the building housed the 'American Red Cross Club'. Between 1946 and 1950 it was a temporary college, particularly to train ex-service students. Subsequently it has been used mainly for offices, by Perkins Engines and Peterborough Development Corporation. In the early 1950s, when it housed the sales department of Perkins Engines, it was given the name 'Peterscourt'. The doorway at the side of the building was rescued from the Guildhall, London after the London Blitz and brought to Frank Perkins' offices in Peterscourt. The Peterborough Development Corporation's headquarters were here from 1969 to 1975.

Restoration and refurbishment took place in 1985. As of 2017 it is the home of the Eco Innovation Centre. In 2023, it was being used as a serviced office centre by NPS on behalf of Peterborough City Council.

== Listing and description ==
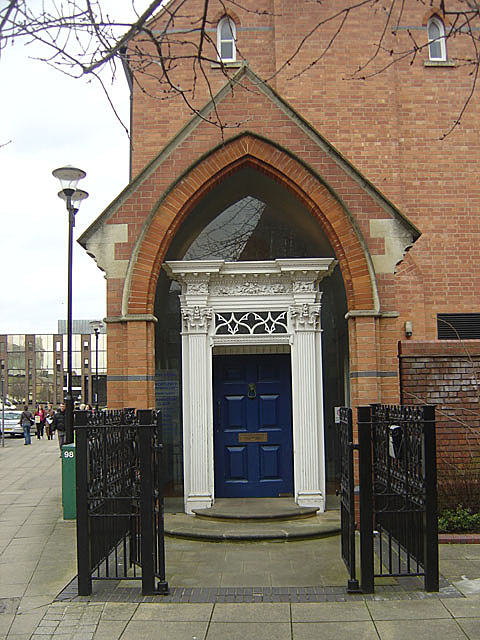
Peterscourt - west entrance

The building is mainly listed for the early 18th-century doorway which was brought from the London Guildhall following damage in the Second World War. It has finely carved Corinthian pilasters with swags on the frieze and a rectangular fanlight with Gothick glazing.
