= Swanscombe and Greenhithe =

Civil parish in Kent, England

Coordinates: 51°27′00″N 0°18′32″E

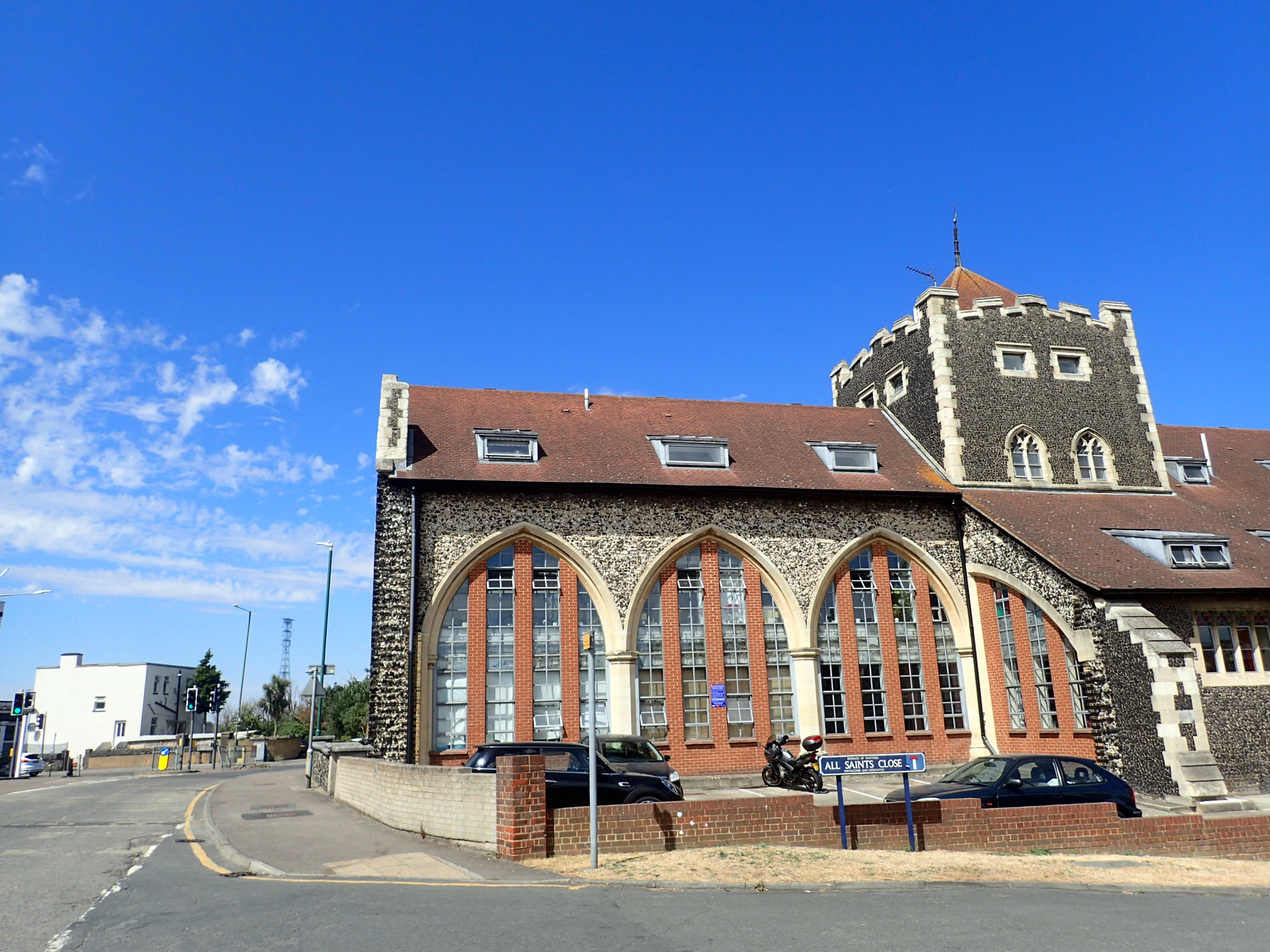
- All Saints Church, Swanscombe

- Location within Kent
- Interactive map of Swanscombe and Greenhithe
- Population: 14,128 (2011)
- OS grid reference: TQ604749
- Civil parish: Swanscombe and Greenhithe
- District: Dartford
- Shire county: Kent
- Region: South East
- Country: England
- Sovereign state: United Kingdom
- Post town: GREENHITHE, SWANSCOMBE, GRAVESEND
- Postcode district: DA9, DA10, DA11
- Dialling code: 01322, 01987
- Police: Kent
- Fire: Kent
- Ambulance: South East Coast
- Website: Swanscombe and Greenhithe Town Council

Swanscombe and Greenhithe is a civil parish in the Borough of Dartford in Kent, England. Swanscombe and Greenhithe is a recent renaming of the ancient parish of Swanscombe, covering Swanscombe and Greenhithe. The parish included much of the Ebbsfleet Valley new town development until 2019. The local council is Swanscombe and Greenhithe Town Council.

== History ==
Swanscombe was an ancient parish in the Axstane Hundred of Kent. In 1894 it became part of Dartford Rural District and Swanscombe Parish Council was formed. In 1926 it was removed from the rural district and became a separate urban district. When the urban district was abolished in 1974 the parish council was formed again as the successor parish to Swanscombe Urban District. In 1981 Swanscombe Parish Council resolved to become a town council and was renamed Swanscombe and Greenhithe, thus electing its own mayor for the first time.

== Governance ==
The local council is Swanscombe and Greenhithe Town Council.

== Geography ==
The two villages which give the parish its name are both located on the south bank of the River Thames, approximately midway between Dartford town and Gravesend. At the 2011 Census the population of the civil parish was 14,128. Swanscombe village is an ancient one. Greenhithe railway station also serves the Bluewater shopping centre.

Until 2019 the parish included much of the Ebbsfleet Valley area which is undergoing regeneration from industry (cement works at one time dominated it) to housing and lighter industrial use. The Ebbsfleet area was removed from the parish on 2 May 2019 to become an unparished area.

== See also ==
- Listed buildings in Swanscombe and Greenhithe
