= Swanscombe =

Village in Kent, England

Coordinates: 51.4491°N 0.2993°E

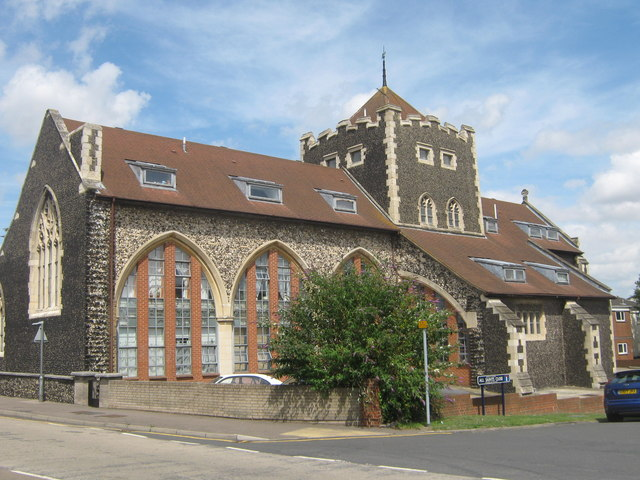
- All Saints' Church, Swanscombe

- Location within Kent
- Population: 6,300
- OS grid reference: TQ598747
- Civil parish: Swanscombe and Greenhithe
- District: Dartford
- Shire county: Kent
- Region: South East
- Country: England
- Sovereign state: United Kingdom
- Post town: SWANSCOMBE
- Postcode district: DA10
- Dialling code: 01322
- Police: Kent
- Fire: Kent
- Ambulance: South East Coast
- UK Parliament: Dartford

Swanscombe (/swɔːnzkəm/) is a town in the Borough of Dartford in Kent, England, and the civil parish of Swanscombe and Greenhithe. It is 4.4 miles west of Gravesend and 4.8 miles east of Dartford. It had a population of 6300.

== History ==
=== Prehistory ===
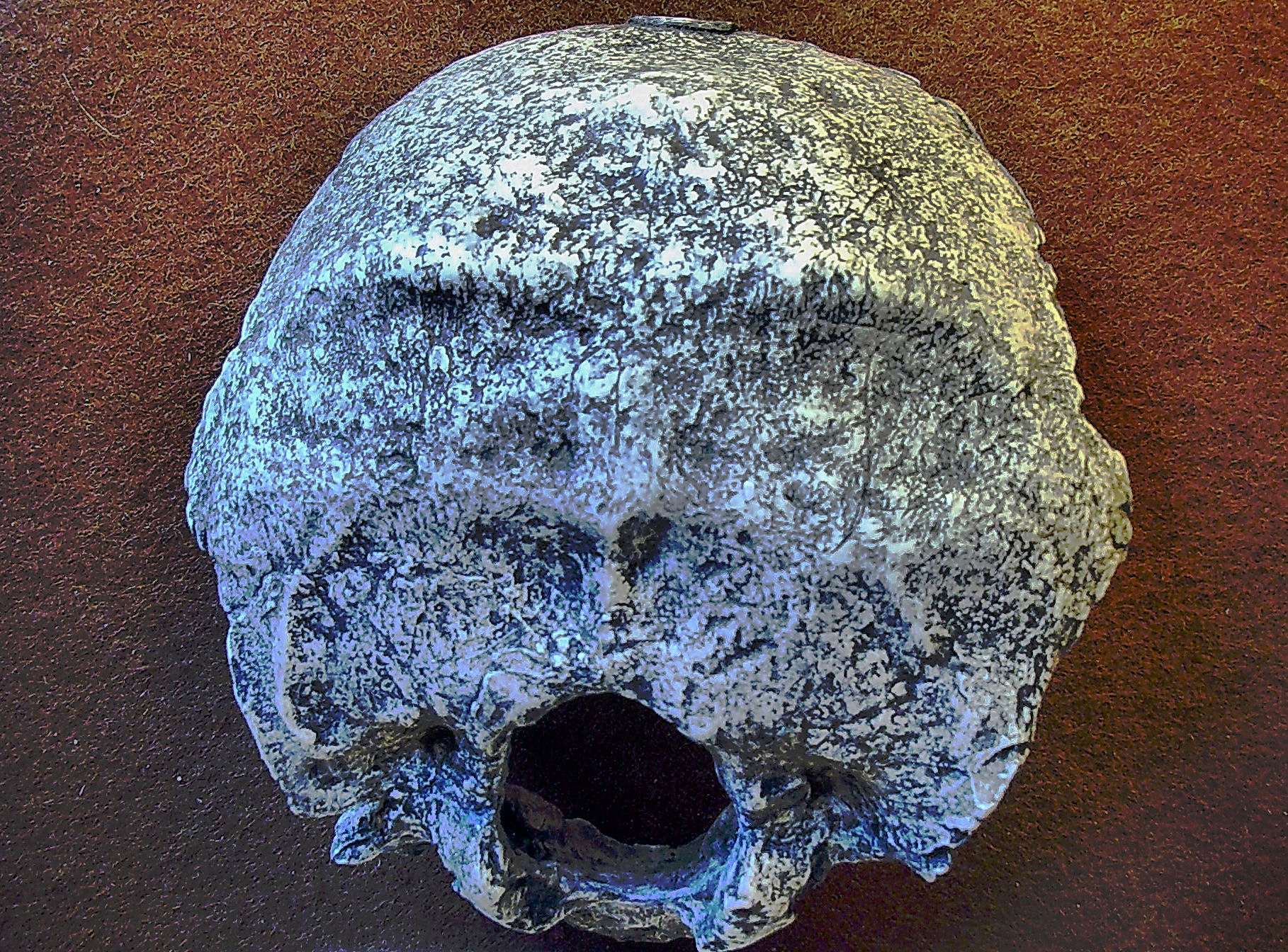
Back of the Swanscombe-skull (replica)

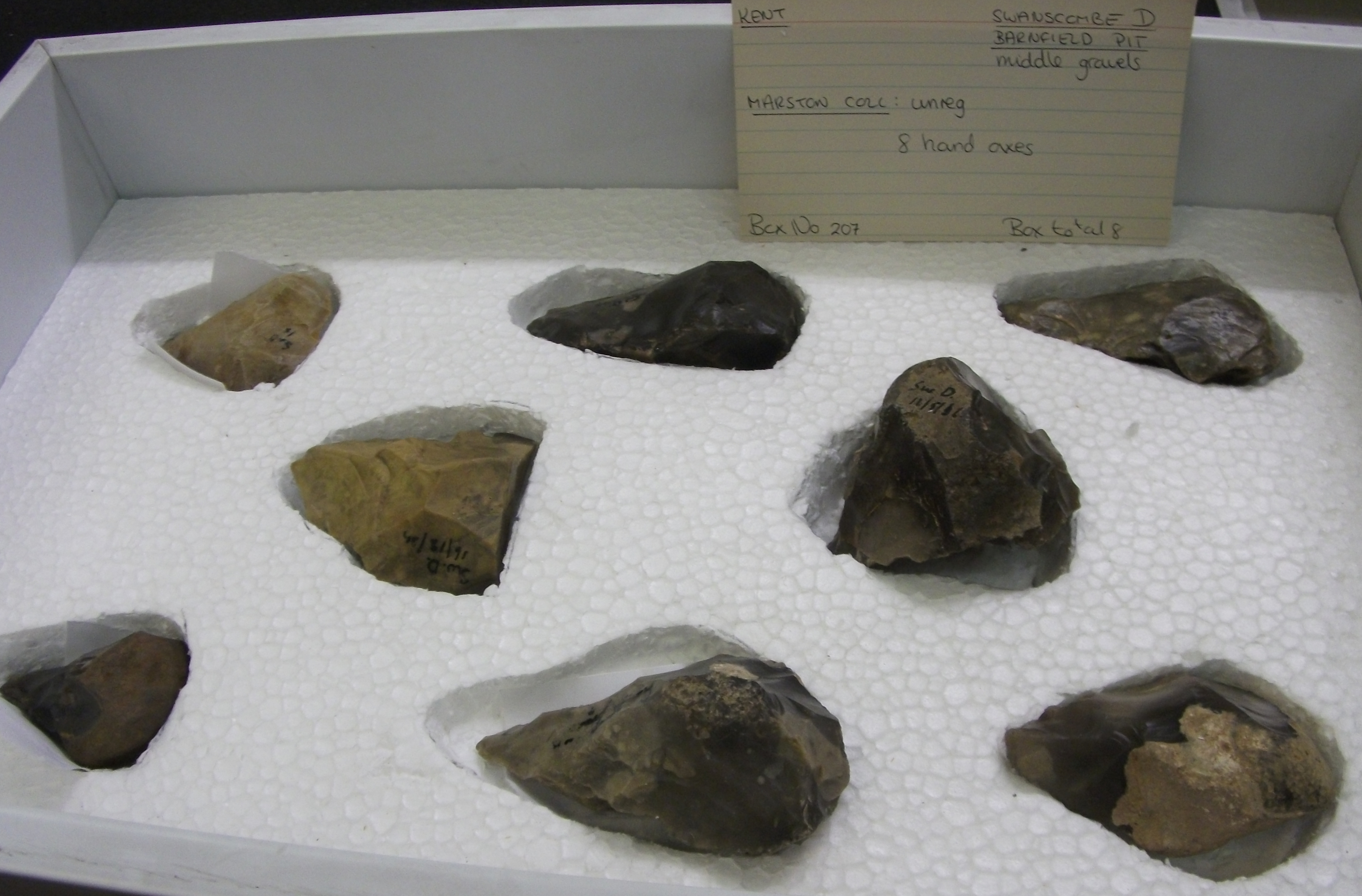
Box of 8 hand axes from the middle gravels of Barnfield Pit, contained in the British Museum

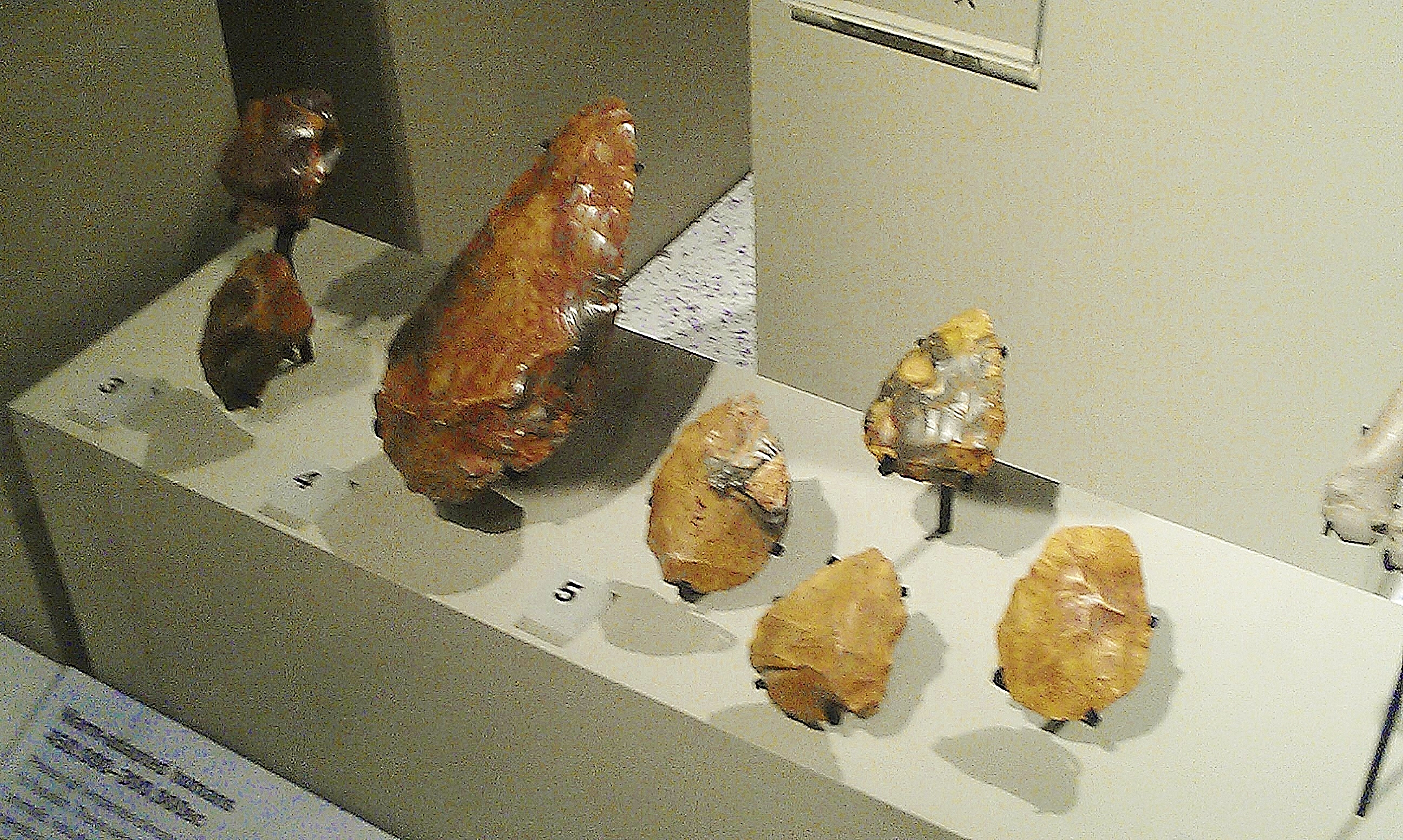
Lithics from Swanscombe on display at the Museum of London

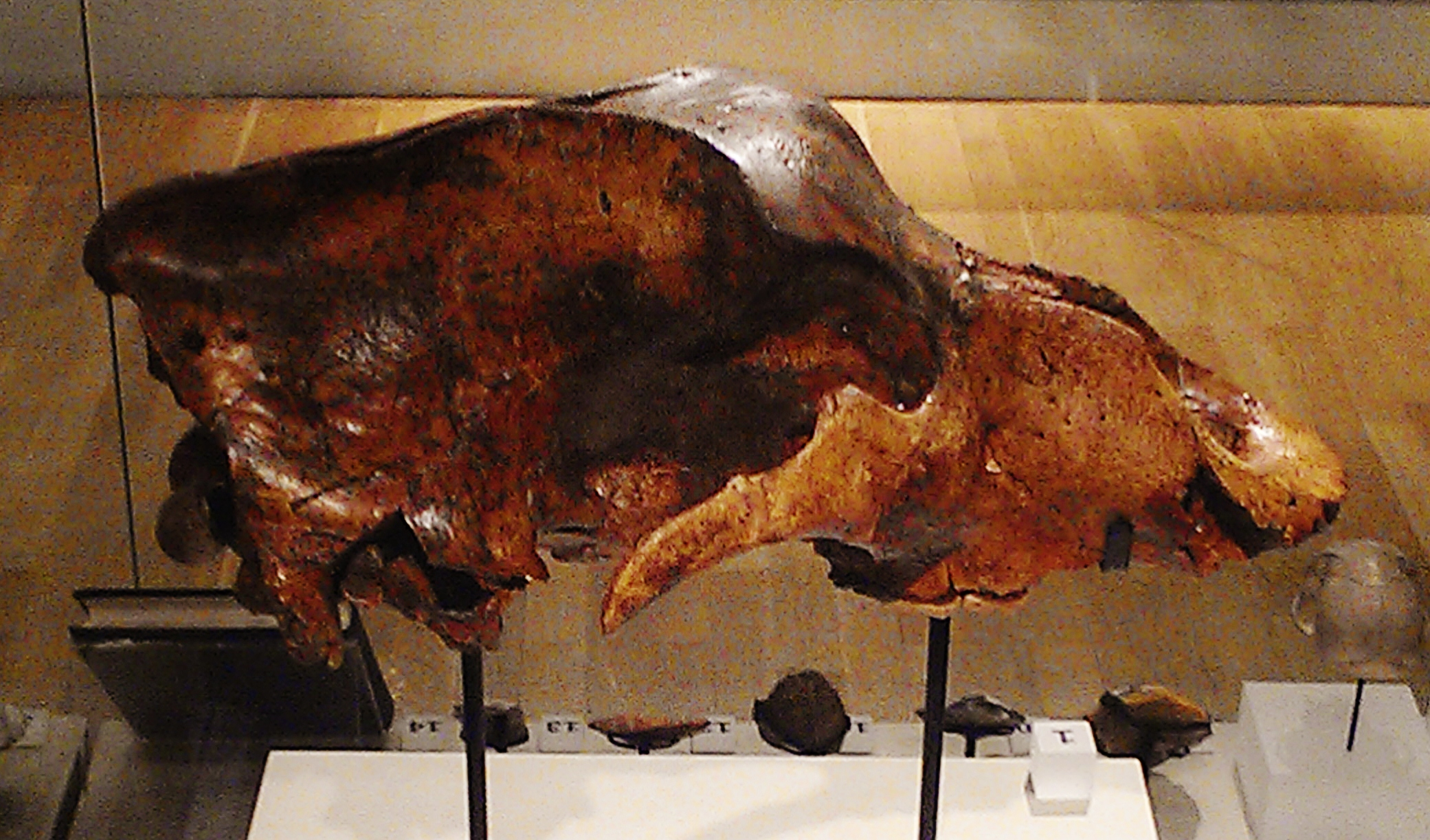
Bear skull from Swanscombe on display at the Museum of London

Bone fragments and tools, representing the earliest humans known to have lived in England, have been found from 1935 onwards at Barnfield Pit about 2 km (1 mile) outside the village. This site is now the Swanscombe Heritage Park. Swanscombe Man (now thought to be female) was a late Homo erectus or an early archaic Homo sapiens. According to the Natural History Museum, however, the remains are those of a 400,000-year-old early Neanderthal woman.

The c. 400,000-year-old skull fragments are kept at the Natural History Museum in London with a replica on display at the Dartford Museum. Lower levels of the Barnfield Pit yielded evidence of an even earlier, more primitive, human, dubbed Clactonian Man.

Nearby digs on land for the Channel Tunnel Rail Link revealed a c. 400,000-year-old site with human tools and the remains of a straight-tusked elephant (Palaeoloxodon antiquus), and evidence of water vole, pine vole, newts, frogs etc., indicating a site with standing water similar to a swamp. The elephant is thought to have been butchered by humans at the site.

=== Viking era ===
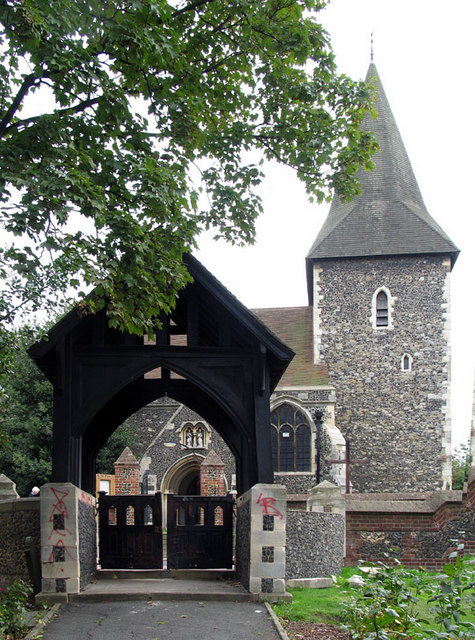
Church of St Peter and St Paul, Swanscombe

During archaeological work undertaken at Ebbsfleet, before construction of High Speed 1, an Anglo-Saxon mill and a Roman villa were found near Swanscombe.

From Crayford to the Isle of Thanet the Danes occupied the land and terrorised the Saxon inhabitants, giving rise to the appearance of Deneholes, of which many have survived to this day. These were wells, cut deep into the chalk landscape, thought to be for concealing people and goods. They have a simple vertical shaft with short horizontal tunnels from the base.

The Vikings settled throughout the winter along the Thames estuary with their ships and established camps in Kent and Essex. In surveying the distribution of the many deneholes along the Thames corridor it would appear that Essex, on the northern shore of the Thames, sustained a greater influx of Vikings than did Kent, there being considerably more recorded deneholes in Essex, particularly around Orsett and Grays – see Hangman's Wood.

Archaeological digs and centuries of tilling have revealed a Danish castle and settlement, with pottery, anchors, weapons and some ships' timbers. The settlement was later variously called Suinescamp (in Domesday Book of 1086), Sweinscamp and Swanscamp. Legend derives the name from the Viking king Sweyn Forkbeard, who landed in East Anglia and became King of England in 1013. The father of Canute, Sweyn died at Gainsborough, on the Trent, in 1014. Canute (Cnut) died in Shaftesbury in 1035 and his sons were unable to hold on to his empire. But the name of Swanscombe cannot derive from Sweyn Forkbeard since the place-name is first attested in 695 AD.

Other research suggests that deneholes may have been dug as a method of extracting chalk for use on the fields above, or the mining may have been a by-product of defence. In any case the practice reached a peak around the 13th – 14th centuries, long after the Viking raids had ceased.

=== Norman Conquest ===
It is claimed, apparently without evidence, that in 1066 Swanscombe locals massed an army in defiance of William I and so won the right to continue their ancient privileges, including the tradition of passing inheritance by gavelkind. The Men of Kent, together with Kentish Men, met William near Swanscombe, where the Saxons concealed their number with branches, thus intimidating the Norman army. Again according to legend, they were offered a truce that left Kent as the only region in England that William left unconquered. Hence in this area of England alone Kent County Council adopted the motto Invicta, meaning unconquered.

=== Churches ===
Richard Norman Shaw designed All Saints' Church in 1894. It was built of knapped flint for the workers of the cement industry. It survives as a rare example of his design, covering several Gothic Revival styles throughout its architecture and features such as Decorated tracery on the windows and Arts and Crafts Perpendicular woodwork in the interior.

The flint parish church of St Peter and St Paul is mostly of the 13th century. However various sections contain Early Norman material. The tower and chancel contain 11th- and 12th-century work respectively, although the tower was reconstructed in the 13th century and the chancel arch is from the 14th century. The lower section of the tower contains some Saxon material. The tower is topped with a broached shingled spire, and in 1902 the church was struck by lightning, causing extensive damage. A large-scale restoration was undertaken by Jabez Bignall in 1872–73 and again by him after the damage from the lightning strike. The parish register dates from 1559. George Cecil Renouard is buried in the Swanscombe churchyard.

=== Second World War ===
Just after 8 o'clock in the evening of Sunday 10 November 1940 a German bomb crashed down direct into The Morning Star Inn, causing in a single explosion Swanscombe's worst wartime disaster. All that was left after the explosion was, where the pub had stood, a "heap of bricks and twisted rafters"¹ surrounding the smouldering pit that had been the cellar, although the staircase leading to the clubroom upstairs extended up out of the wreckage. Distressed families of those known to be in the pub at the time gathered at the street corners awaiting news of the casualties as bodies were gradually recovered from the ruins.

The official casualty lists revealed the death toll to be 27, with six others seriously injured and five people slightly hurt.

"The landlord was amongst the dead, although his wife and son survived. The barmaid who was killed had given notice the week before the raid but had stayed on that evening because of the match. One of the other victims was a merchant seaman on seven days' leave who had spent two days travelling from Scotland to see his wife and children and was having a drink with his father in the pub at the time of the bombing: both were killed."

On 30 July 1940 another Luftwaffe raid led to the death of more than a dozen civilians, with 22 seriously injured. Its proximity to London and position under the German flight path to the city meant that Swanscombe fell victim to this kind of damage several times during the war.

On 30 July 1944 a V-1 flying bomb landed on Taunton Road. Half of one side of the road was wiped out. 13 were killed and 22 seriously injured.

=== Cliff Collapse ===
On 10 April 2023, part of the chalk cliff supporting Galley Hill Road (A226) in Swanscombe collapsed, leading to its closure near the former George & Dragon pub. Bus routes were diverted via Stanhope Road, the A2 and Ebbsfleet International. The Ebbsfleet Development Corporation (EDC), overseeing the nearby Ebbsfleet Garden City, confirmed in May 2025 that it had not provided funding nor committed resources for repairing the road. The closure has affected local transport and highlighted infrastructure challenges in the Ebbsfleet Valley development area.

== Governance ==
Swanscombe was originally part of Axstane Hundred and in 1836 also became part of Dartford Poor Law Union. When Dartford Rural District was created in 1894, Swanscombe parish became one of its constituent parishes, as did most of the parishes of Axstane. In 1926, Swanscombe Urban District Council was formed, separating the area from the rural district and establishing it as an urban district in its own right.

The council remained in existence until 1974, when it was abolished under the Local Government Act 1972 and its area was transferred to the newly created Borough of Dartford. Although the urban district council was dissolved, the area continued as a civil parish within Dartford Borough Council. In 1981, the parish council was reconstituted as Swanscombe and Greenhithe Town Council, gaining town status and the ability to appoint a mayor for the first time.

== Cement industry ==
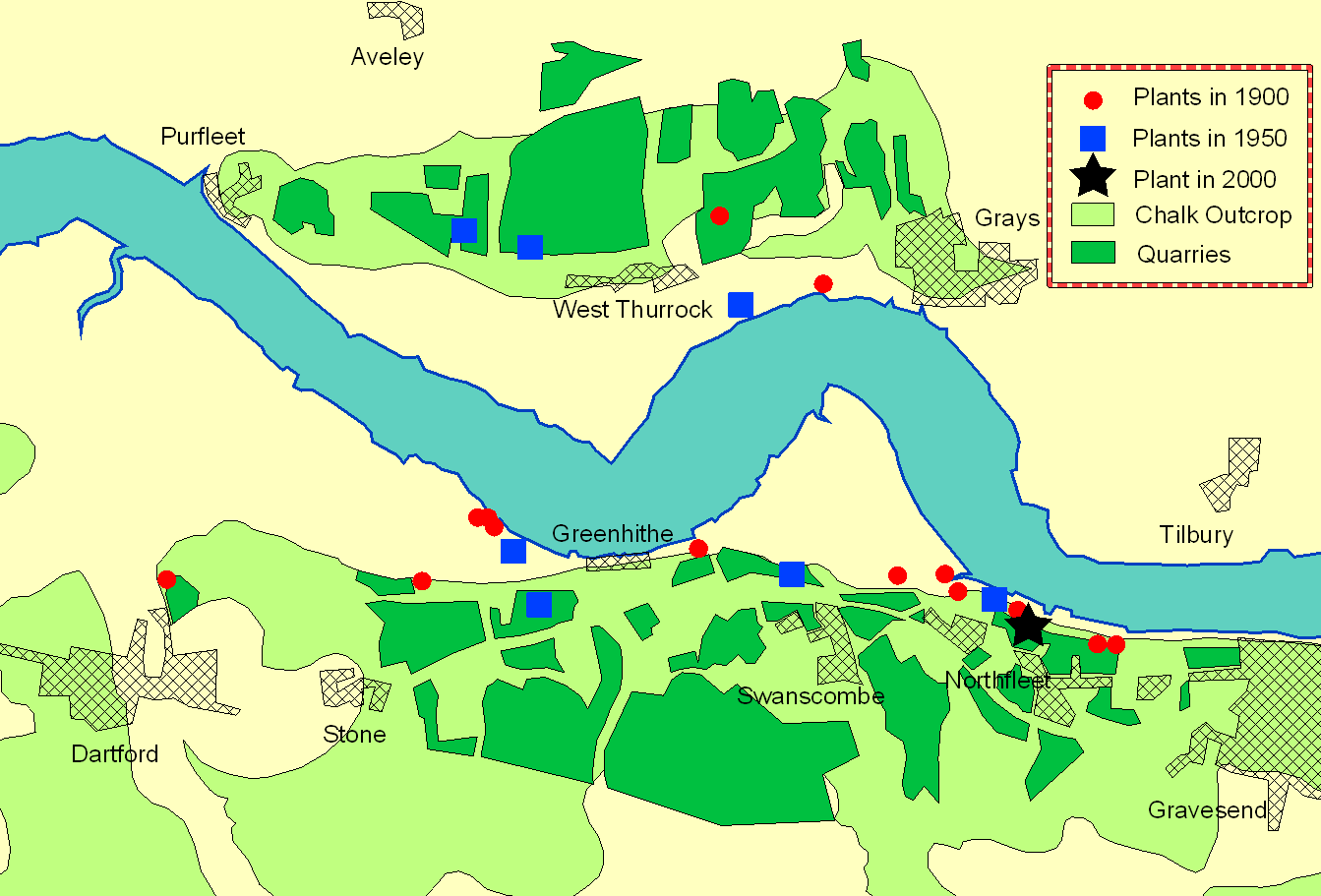
Cement plants on the Thames estuary

The southeast of England has abundant resources of clay and chalk. The first mining activity known in the area was for flint, a rock commonly found across the North and South Downs and in the Weald. This was used for tools.

Swanscombe was important in the early history of cement. The first cement manufacturing works near Swanscombe were opened at Northfleet by James Parker, around 1792, making "Roman cement" from cement stone brought from the Isle of Sheppey. James Frost opened a works at Swanscombe in 1825, using chalk from Galley Hill, having patented a new cement called British Cement. The Swanscombe plant was subsequently acquired by John Bazley White & Co, which became the largest component of Blue Circle Industries when it formed in 1900. It finally shut down in 1990. Between 1840 and 1930 it was the largest cement plant in Britain. By 1882 several cement manufacturers were operating across the north Kent region, but the resulting dust pollution drove the people of Swanscombe to take legal action against the local cement works. Despite various technological innovations, the problem persisted into the 1950s, with telegraph lines over an inch thick in white dust. Modern cement kilns in Kent using chimneys 170 m (550 feet) in height are now said to be the cleanest in the world. However, the neighbouring Medway towns are reported to be the most polluted inhabited area in the UK, and the cement industry contributes to acid rain in Scandinavia.

=== Blue Circle ===
The Associated Portland Cement Manufacturers (APCM), later known as Blue Circle Industries, came to the area in 1900 and by 1920 owned four local factories located at Swanscombe, Northfleet, Greenhithe and Stone.

By 1970 the North Kent cement industry had evolved to become the largest centre for the production of cement in Europe, supporting a long tradition of research and development to perfect the processes used in the manufacture of chalk-based products. Since then the industry has declined considerably due to the potential for more economic manufacture elsewhere, and by 2007 only two operational kilns remained, both at Northfleet. As of 2014 all have been removed.

=== Developments ===
One of the large former quarries, Western Quarry, a legacy of the cement industry and located between Watling Street and the village of Stone, now forms the site of Bluewater shopping centre, one of the largest retail complexes in Europe.

An adjacent quarry is to be given up for housing – more than 6,000 houses will be built there. The development by Land Securities, known as Ebbsfleet Valley, will consist of three primary schools, a secondary school, a health and social care centre and more than 20 acres (8 ha) of new parkland, lakes and woodland.

== Palaeoloxodon antiquus ==
The skeleton of an ancient species of elephant has been preserved in the sediment near what was once the edge of a quite small lake revealed by excavations in advance of the Channel Tunnel Rail Link. The skeleton was surrounded by flint tools suggesting it was butchered for its meat by early humans of that era. Only a few elephant skeletons have been found in Britain. The Swanscombe example was discovered in 2004 by Palaeolithic archaeologist Francis Wenban-Smith and was identified by the Natural History Museum as the straight-tusked Palaeoloxodon antiquus, which became extinct more than 100,000 years ago.

== Cricket club ==
There is one cricket club with its home in Swanscombe, Swanscombe and Greenhithe 1880 CC. Its home ground is at Broomfield Park. The club dates back to 1880.

== Demography ==
Swanscombe compared
2001 UK Census	Swanscombe	Dartford District	England
Total population	6,418	85,911	49,138,831
Foreign born	3.4%	5.8%	9.2%
White	96.6%	94.5%	90.9%
Asian	1.2%	3.2%	4.6%
Black	0.8%	0.9%	2.3%
Christian	72.7%	73.3%	72%
Muslim	0.2%	0.7%	3.1%
Hindu	0.3%	0.8%	1.1%
No religion	17.3%	15.1%	15%
Unemployed	3.8%	2.5%	3.3%

At the 2001 UK census the Swanscombe electoral ward had a population of 6,418.

The ethnicity was 96.6% white, 1.1% mixed race, 1.2% Asian, 0.8% black and 0.3% other. The place of birth of residents was 96.6% United Kingdom, 0.5% Republic of Ireland, 0.5% other Western European countries and 2.4% elsewhere. Religion was recorded as 72.7% Christian, 0.3% Buddhist, 0.3% Hindu, 0.3% Sikh and 0.2% Muslim. 17.3% were recorded as having no religion, 0.2% had an alternative religion and 8.7% did not state their religion.

The economic activity of residents aged 16–74 was 46% in full-time employment, 11.9% in part-time employment, 6.5% self-employed, 3.8% unemployed, 1.4% students with jobs, 2.5% students without jobs, 11.1% retired, 8.7% looking after home or family, 5% permanently sick or disabled and 3.2% economically inactive for other reasons. Of the ward's residents aged 16–74, 7.7% had a higher education qualification or the equivalent, compared with 20% nationwide. The sector of employment of residents was 21.6% retail, 9.3% health and social work, 15.7% manufacturing, 10.5% construction, 10.4% real estate, 4.7% education, 8.6% transport and communications, 4.7% public administration, 3.7% hotels and restaurants, 4.4% finance, 0.7% agriculture and 5.7% other.

== Transport ==
=== Rail ===
Swanscombe railway station connects the village with National Rail services to Luton via Woolwich Arsenal and London St Pancras, London Charing Cross via Sidcup and Rainham via Gravesend.

=== Buses ===
Swanscombe is served by Arriva Kent Thameside routes 480 and 483 and Go-Coach routes CB1 and Go2, which connect it with Bluewater, Dartford, Ebbsfleet, Gravesend, Greenhithe and Northfleet.

== See also ==
- The Ebbsfleet Academy
- London Resort – proposed theme park and resort on Swanscombe Peninsula
- Swanscombe Palaeolithic site
