= Ebbsfleet Valley =

New town and redevelopment area in Kent, England

Coordinates: 51.434322°N 0.297071°E

- Planned urban area
- Location within Kent
- Area: 2,604 km^{2} (1,005 sq mi)
- Population: 5,820 (2024 estimate)
  - Density: 2/km^{2} (5.2/sq mi)
- OS grid reference: TQ597730
- Civil parish: Unparished area
- District: Dartford; Gravesham
- Shire county: Kent
- Region: South East
- Country: England
- Sovereign state: United Kingdom
- Post town: SWANSCOMBE
- Postcode district: DA10
- Dialling code: 01322
- Police: Kent
- Fire: Kent
- Ambulance: South East Coast
- UK Parliament: Dartford; Gravesham

Ebbsfleet Valley is a new town and redevelopment area in Kent, South East England, and part of the Thames Gateway, southwest of Gravesend. Development is coordinated by the Ebbsfleet Development Corporation. It is named after the valley of the Ebbsfleet River, which it straddles. Although a small part of the site in the east lies within the borough of Gravesham, most of Ebbsfleet Valley is in the borough of Dartford.

== History ==
=== Toponymy ===
The name Ebbsfleet is an artificial creation of a seventeenth-century antiquarian, partly inspired by the name of Ebbsfleet in Thanet, 47 mi (76 km) to the east.

=== Archaeology ===
The Ebbsfleet River is of historical importance in English history and prehistory, and much archaeological excavation has taken place here over the years. In 2003, during the excavation of HS1, a skeleton of a large adult straight-tusked elephant dating to around 400,000 years ago (MIS 11) was found associated with Clactonian stone tools used to butcher it, likely produced by Homo heidelbergensis or early Neanderthals. Distinctive pottery from the Neolithic age has been discovered; such pots are eponymously known as the "Ebbsfleet ware".

Belgic Britons, in the late Iron Age have left behind traces of their culture. Prior to the construction of the Channel Tunnel Rail Link in this area, archaeological work undertaken at Ebbsfleet found an Anglo-Saxon mill. The river, which is fed by eight natural springs at Springhead (Latin: Vagniacis), was held sacred by the Celts who settled in the area around 100 BC. They were followed by the Romans; their Watling Street passes through the site, and a villa has been excavated.

== Governance ==
The area is primarily in the Ebbsfleet electoral ward of Dartford, returning councillors to Dartford Borough Council. The section in Gravesham elects councillors to Gravesham Borough Council. The Dartford section formed part of the civil parish of Swanscombe and Greenhithe until 2 May 2019 and then became an unparished area. The review of governance leading up to the change had included the option for a new civil parish of Ebbsfleet with a community council.

In 2015, the government established the Ebbsfleet Development Corporation as a non-departmental public body of the Department of Communities and Local Government under the Ebbsfleet Development Corporation (Area and Constitution) Order 2015.

== Geography ==
Ebbsfleet Valley is located in Kent, in South East England. It is part of a region for redevelopment spanning the Thames Estuary known as the Thames Gateway. It is located southwest of Gravesend and south of Swanscombe. Most of Ebbsfleet Valley is in the borough of Dartford and a small part of the site in the east lies is within the borough of Gravesham.

== Redevelopment ==
Much of the land is brownfield and was formerly used by industry; having been previously owned by the APCM, Blue Circle and most recently by Lafarge. The new community is planned to have a population of 40,000.

=== Ebbsfleet Garden City ===
In March 2014, the UK Government announced it had selected Ebbsfleet for a garden city of 15,000 homes and related infrastructure. It includes land in both Gravesham and Dartford boroughs. As of 2023, Ebbsfleet Garden City is under construction. Alkerden Education Campus will be built. Ebbsfleet Central is a mixed-use project around Ebbsfleet International station. The Health, Education, and Innovation Quarter (HEiQ) is a mixed-use development that will provide community, cultural and retail facilities.

=== Timeline ===
- 1996: Ebbsfleet Central Outline Application submitted.
- 1999: Bluewater Shopping Centre opens.
- 2002: Outline planning permission for homes granted by Gravesham and Dartford Council.
- 2003: Springhead Masterplan approved, Eastern Quarry Outline Application Submitted.
- 2004: Swanscombe Peninsula Outline permission submitted for mixed-use scheme.
- 2007: Eastern Quarry Outline Application approval, Ebbsfleet International Station opens for HS1 rail service, First residential development started at Springhead in Gravesham.
- 2009: Ebbsfleet International Domestic Services Commence.
- 2011: October Dartford Core Strategy Adopted.
- 2012: Eastern Quarry Revised Masterplan Approval.
- 2014: London Resort NSIP Status Awarded, Gravesham Core Strategy Adopted.
- 2015: Ebbsfleet Garden City & Ebbsfleet Development Corporation established.
- 2017: Ebbsfleet Healthy New Towns pilot begins, Castle Hill Community Centre & Cherry Orchard Primary Academy opened, Works begin to construct Springhead Bridge.
- 2019: Major electrical grid improvements bring power to Ebbsfleet, Ebbsfleet Development Corporation purchases a 125-hectare site around Ebbsfleet International.
- 2020: A2 Bean and Bluewater network improvements, Ebbsfleet's 2000th home completed, Springhead Bridge opens to the public and wins the Civil Project of the Year at SECBE Constructing Excellence Award.
- 2022: Ebbsfleet Development Corporation submitted the outline planning application for the first phase of new development in Ebbsfleet Central.

=== Sustainability ===
The development is proposed to be net-zero carbon upon completion. The development participated in the The Queen's Green Canopy initiative during the Platinum Jubilee in 2022 to encourage greening.

Richard Rogers, a former government adviser on cities, said: "They shouldn’t be building down there. East London still has masses of brownfield land, so why are we building 15 miles out? This is not a sustainable option."

=== Reaction ===
The development is referred to as a garden city, intended to be sustainable with publicly owned infrastructure and facilities, with inhabitants working on the estates. This was said to be inspired by the Stockholm suburbs such as Hammarby where the design there is to have cycleways, and 1,500 self-build homes, houseboats and parkland. The planning committee chair, Derek Hunnisett, said "We are looking for a higher quality than the normal and what we are getting [so far] is the norm – standard off-the-peg stuff.".

The current development already contradicts policy and academic papers written in recent times to inform the coalition government's 'blueprint'. "A strong landscape structure, that matures over time to create a leafy green character. Tree lined streets, green verges and planted front gardens".

The Ebbsfleet Garden City development has faced criticisms concerning the concept of a new garden city, quality of housing, and insufficient planning. Critics argue that the initial proposal for a garden city was a veil over inadequate planning and expressed concerns over the slow pace of housing construction and the quality of the built homes. Additionally, the aspiration for a healthy urbanism initiative is a response to ensure high-quality housing and well-integrated social and economic infrastructure, addressing some of the criticisms indirectly.

=== London Resort ===
The London Resort were given permission to build a theme park on potential housing land on the adjoining Swanscombe Peninsula site, nationally significant infrastructure project status, allowing the developers to bypass local planning requirements and build a leisure complex that by 2019 may create employment for 27,000 people. Highways England consulted, in early 2017, about improvements to the A2 junctions in the area, citing a traffic increase of 200%.

== Economy ==
The development of Ebbsfleet Garden City is expected to provide 32,000 new jobs.

The area was used by BT for a trial of broadband and telephone via optical fibre cable.

== Transport ==
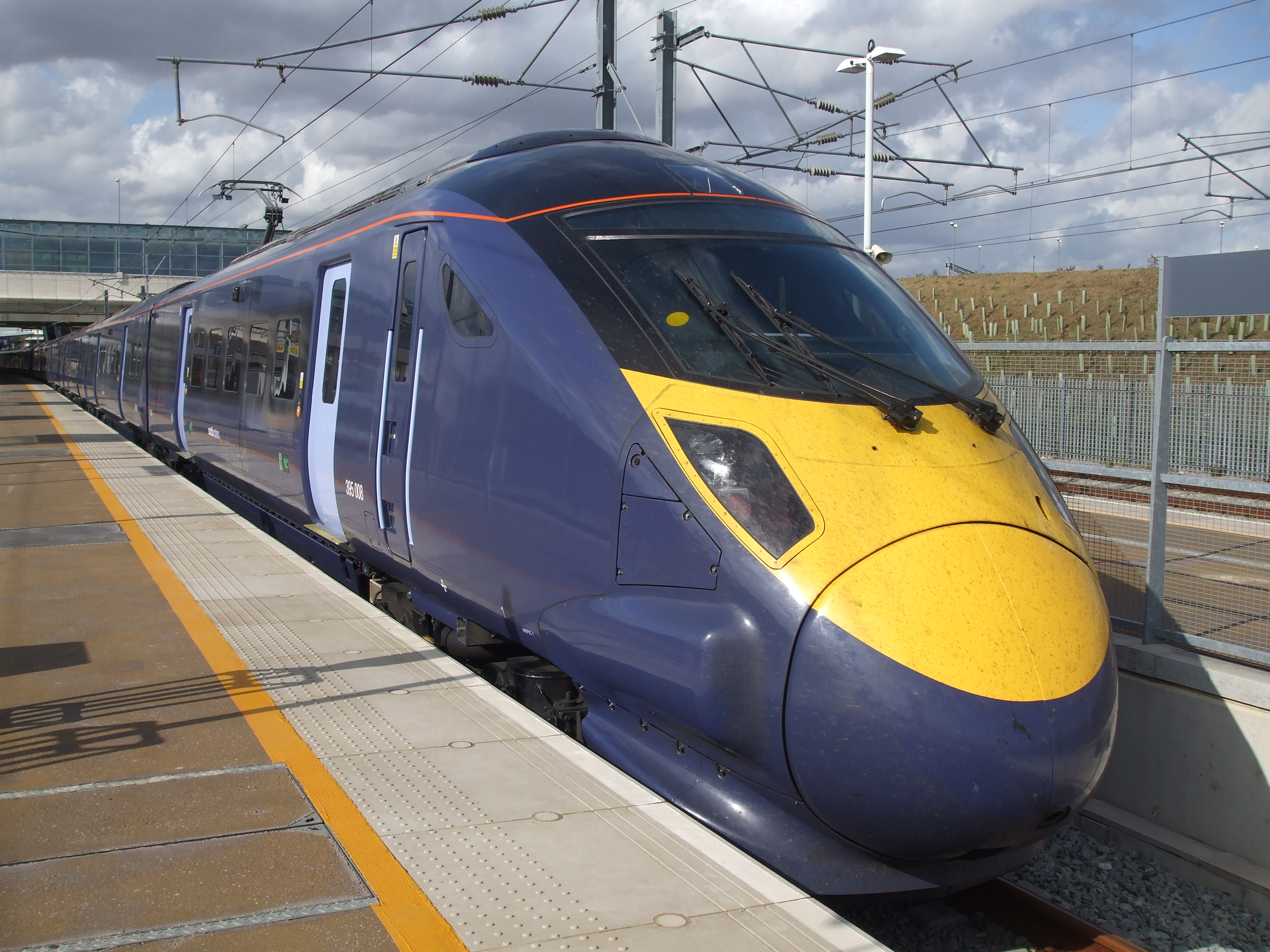
Southeastern British Rail Class 395 High Speed EMU at Ebbsfleet International station in 2009

Ebbsfleet International railway station was opened in November 2007. Domestic services on High Speed 1 to St Pancras railway station in central London are operated by Southeastern. It used to provide Eurostar services to Continental Europe, although these trains no longer call.

Fastrack route C operated by Go-Ahead London runs from Ingress Park in Greenhithe, Bluewater Shopping Centre and Castle Hill in Ebbsfleet to Gravesend. Ebbsfleet was served by Arriva bus services 484, 485 and 485A but it has since been replaced by the ArrivaClick demand responsive transport on 30 November 2020. On 11 December 2024, it was announced that Ebbsfleet will close ArrivaClick from 31 December 2024. Go-Coach now operates the Go2 demand-responsive transport service since 3 February 2025 serving surrounding areas such as Castle Hill, Greenhithe and Swanscombe. Fastrack E commenced operations on 10 November 2024 between Castle Hill and Gravesend. On 16 August 2025, the route was extended to Bluewater, before being replaced by Fastrack C on 1 August 2026.

== Civic identity ==
The football team Gravesend and Northfleet FC changed their name to Ebbsfleet United F.C. in the summer of 2007. Another move to promote a sense of identity in the new town is a planned landmark, which when built will be 50 m (160 ft) high (twice as high as the Angel of the North) and is intended to be visible from road, rail and air. However, in June 2012, the project was stalled by a lack of funding. Swan Valley Community School closed in 2013, and was replaced by the Ebbsfleet Academy.
