= Sutton-at-Hone =

Village in Kent, England

Coordinates: 51.409230°N 0.234680°E

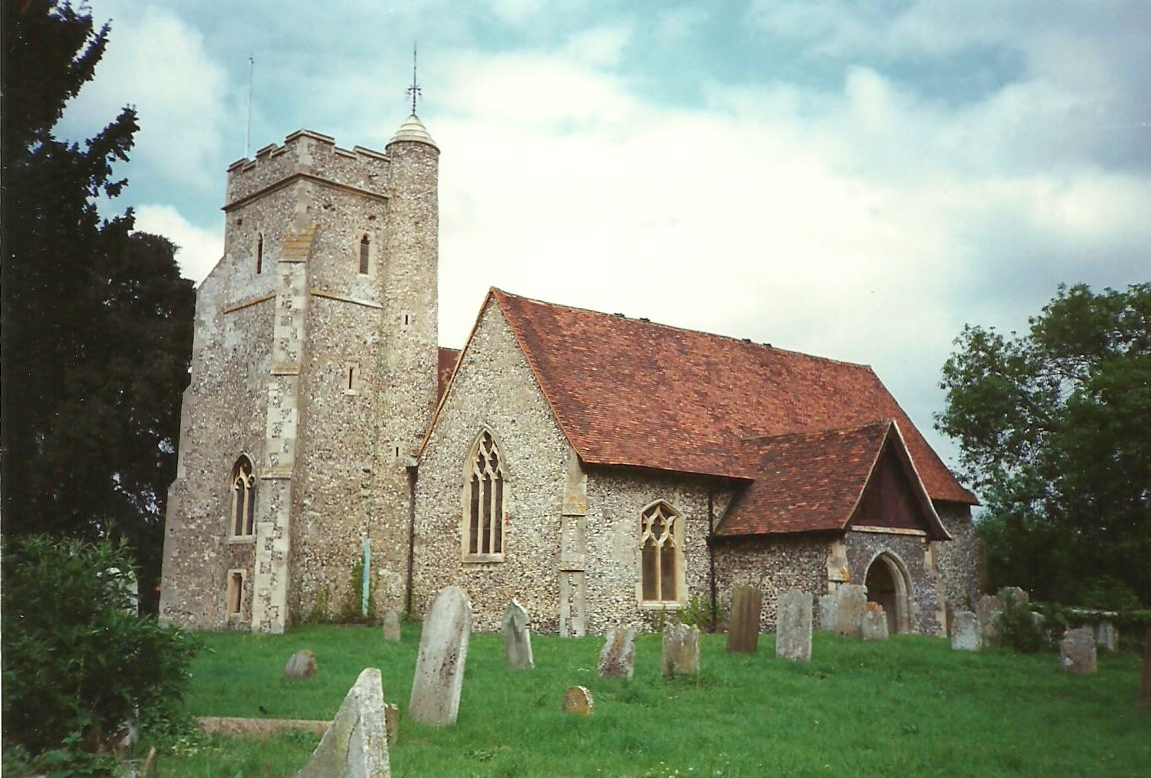
- St John's Church

- Location within Kent
- Civil parish: Sutton-at-Hone and Hawley
- District: Dartford
- Shire county: Kent
- Region: South East
- Country: England
- Sovereign state: United Kingdom
- Post town: DARTFORD
- Postcode district: DA4
- Dialling code: 01322
- Police: Kent
- Fire: Kent
- Ambulance: South East Coast
- UK Parliament: Dartford

Sutton-at-Hone is a village in the civil parish of Sutton-at-Hone and Hawley in the Borough of Dartford in Kent, England. It is located 3.5 miles south of Dartford & 3.6 miles north east of Swanley.

== History ==
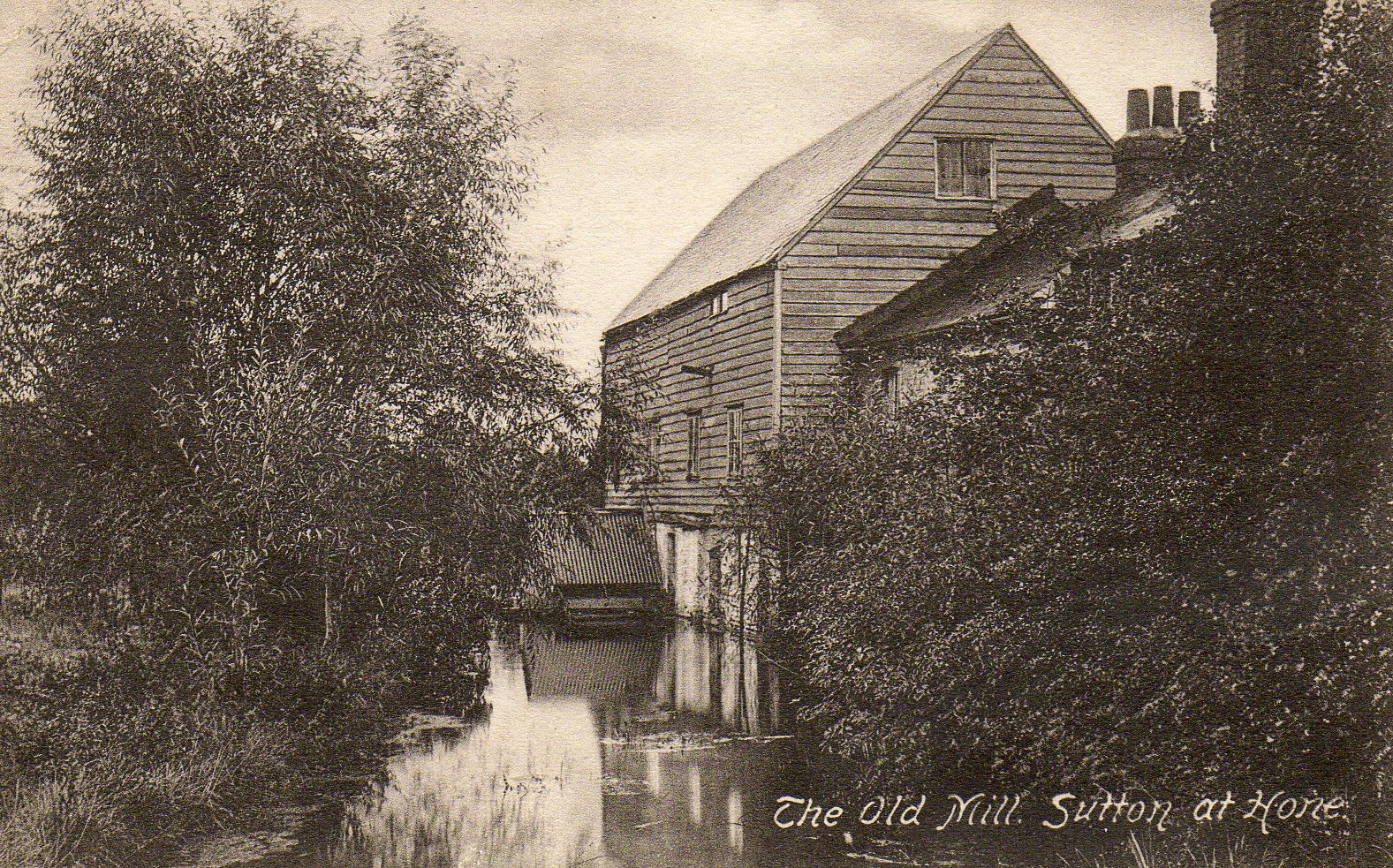
Watermill, 1910s

The place-name 'Sutton-at-Hone' is first attested in the Domesday Book of 1086, where it appears as Sudtone. The place is called Suttone atte hone in a charter of 1281 at one time in the British Museum. The name means 'southern town or settlement near a stone', probably a boundary stone, from the Old English hān meaning 'stone'.

Sutton-at-Hone has a long history. A commandery of the Knights Hospitallers of the Order of Saint John of Jerusalem was established in Sutton-at-Hone in 1199, and is now the National Trust property St John's Jerusalem. The property is partly open to the public (on Wednesday afternoons, April–October), including the 13th-century chapel of the Knights Hospitallers and a garden moated by the River Darent. The church of St John the Baptist was in existence by 1077. It was rebuilt in the 14th century, and substantially rebuilt after a fire in 1615, reputedly caused by a gun being fired at a bird. The parish of Sutton at Hone belonged to Axstane Hundred and its successor Dartford Rural District. The chapelry of Swanley in the parish was formed into a separate parish of Swanley in 1955.

== Sport ==
Sutton Athletic F.C. is an association football team based in Sutton-at-Hone, that competes in the Southern Counties East Football League and play at The London Hire Stadium, Lower road.

Sutton-at-Hone Primary school, also has a very successful girls football team, who were crowned Kent schools champions in 2021, winning the tournament with an unbeaten record, they will also be competing in the southern counties cup in 2022, representing Dartford.

== Lathe of Sutton at Hone ==
The Lathe of Sutton-at-Hone included a large part of Kent and a lot of present-day South East London including the present-day boroughs of Dartford, Bexley, Greenwich, Bromley, Lewisham, and Sevenoaks.

Lathe of Sutton at Hone

The Lathe of Sutton consisted of the following Hundreds:

- Blackheath
- Bromley And Beckenham
- Ruxley
- Little And Lesnes
- Dartford and Wilmington
- Axstane
- Codsheath
- Westerham and Edenbridge
- Somerden

The village of Sutton at Hone is in Axstane Hundred.

The lathe was the most westerly of the lathes into which Kent was divided. The former boundary of the Lathe with the rest of Kent is now, with minor deviations, the boundaries of Dartford and Sevenoaks with the rest of Kent.

Although not formally abolished, hundreds and lathes had fallen out of use by the end of the 19th century, although the Lathe of Sutton was mentioned in the London Gazette as late as 1899.

== Transport ==
=== Rail ===
Sutton-at-Hone is served by Farningham Road railway station with Southeastern services to London Victoria via Bromley South and to Dover Priory via Chatham & Canterbury East.

=== Buses ===
The village is served by the Kent Country route 414 which provides hourly connections to Horton Kirby, South Darenth, Hawley and Dartford.
