= Lathe of Sutton at Hone =

Historical division of Kent, England

Sutton at Hone
- Former subdivision of England
- Area
  - Coordinates: 51.395480°N 0.326980°E
- History
  - Origin: Jutish Kent
  - Created: 6th century
  - Abolished: 1894 (obsolete)
  - Succeeded by: diverse authorities
- Status: obsolete
- Government: Lathe
- Subdivisions
  - Type: Hundreds
  - Units: Blackheath, Bromley and Beckenham, Ruxley, Little and Lesnes, Dartford and Wilmington, Axstane, Codsheath, Wistram (later Westerham and Edenbridge), Somerden

The Lathe of Sutton-at-Hone historically included a large part of Kent: the present-day boroughs of Dartford, Bexley, Greenwich, Bromley, Lewisham, Sevenoaks District and small parts of the Borough of Tonbridge and Malling and Borough of Tunbridge Wells.

It was named after the village and parish of Sutton at Hone in the Darent valley.

The lathe was an ancient administrative division of Kent and originated, probably in the 6th century AD, during the Jutish colonisation of the county. It was not unusual for the Anglo-Saxons to establish their juridical and administrative centres a short distance from more populous towns. In this case Sutton at Hone is about two miles from Dartford, one of only four royal manors in Kent at the time of the Domesday Book.

At that time, Sutton was ranked as a "Half Lathe", as was Milton, to which it was not connected. Alongside these two Half Lathes were five (full) Lathes: Aylesford, Borough, Eastry, Lympne (later renamed Shepway) and Wye. By 1295 Sutton had been promoted to a full lathe, while alongside it were only four other lathes. This was because Borough and Eastry had merged into the Lathe of Saint Augustine, while Milton and Wye had merged to form the Lathe of Scray.

Lathe of Sutton at Hone

The Lathe continued to be an important administrative, judicial and taxation unit for 600 years after the Domesday Book. The functions of Lathe and hundreds were somewhat similar, with a Lathe covering a much wider area. Although never formally abolished, it has had no administrative functions since the end of the 19th century. The Sheriff toured the county twice yearly, visiting each lathe: in the case of Sutton, possibly at Shire Hall. The lathe was responsible for raising of aids and subsidies for the Militia. However the Lathe court became anomalous as it fell between the hundred courts below and the Justices of the county (in petty and quarter sessions) above

The Lathe of Sutton was mentioned in The London Gazette as late as 1899.

According to Hasted, the Lathe of Sutton at Hone consisted of the following Hundreds:

- Blackheath
- Ruxley
- Bromley and Beckenham
- Little and Lesnes
- Dartford and Wilmington
- Axstane
- Codsheath
- Westerham and Edenbridge
- Somerden

The lathe was the most westerly of the lathes into which Kent was divided. The first four hundreds in the above list now collectively form the London boroughs of Lewisham, Greenwich, Bexley and Bromley except Penge which was not originally in the county of Kent.

Dartford and Wilmington Hundred is now in the borough of Dartford. Axstane hundred is now divided between the districts of Dartford and Sevenoaks, while the last three hundreds form the remainder of Sevenoaks District, except that Somerden and therefore the Lathe of Sutton included part of the parish of Speldhurst, which is now in Royal Tunbridge Wells. Thus the boundary of the Lathe with the rest of Kent is still in existence, with minor deviations, as the boundaries Dartford and Sevenoaks local authorities have with the rest of Kent.

The Lathe of Sutton had an area of 173,440 acres (271 sq. miles or 702 km^{2}).
