= Hundred of Ruxley =

Historical Hundred of Kent, England

Coordinates: 51.413°N 0.136°E

Ruxley
- Map published in 1797 showing the hundred of Ruxley with the hundred of Bromley and Beckenham.
- Area
  - 1831: 36,320 acres (147 km^{2})
  - 1851: 36,431 acres (147 km^{2})
- Population
  - 1831: 12,329
  - 1851: 16,312 (in 3026 houses)
- History
  - Created: in antiquity
  - Abolished: 1884 - 1965, see chart
  - Succeeded by: Bromley Rural District, and Bexley Urban District, see chart
- Status: obsolete
- Government: hundred
  - HQ: Ruxley
- Subdivisions
  - Type: Parishes
  - Units: Chelsfield, Cudham, Downe, Farnborough, Foots Cray, Hayes, Keston, Knockholt, North Cray, Orpington, St Mary Cray, St Paul's Cray, and West Wickham, (plus Ruxley before 1557) and parts of Bexley, Chislehurst, Chiddingstone, and Hever.

Ruxley (previously Rokesley, and in the Domesday Book Helmestrei) was an ancient hundred, a land division in the north west of the county of Kent, England. Its area has been mostly absorbed by the growth of London; with its name currently referring to the Ruxley district. Its former area now corresponds to a majority of the London Borough of Bromley, a large part of the London Borough of Bexley and a small part of the Kent District of Sevenoaks. The hundred was within the Lathe of Sutton-at-Hone, in the west division of Kent.

The hundred was approximately fourteen miles (23 km) at its longest north to south and about eight miles (13 km) and its widest east to west. The River Cray was the largest river in the hundred of Ruxley flowing northward through six of its parishes, four of which are named after it. The River Cray rises in Orpington then flows through St Mary Cray, St Paul's Cray, North Cray, Foots Cray, and Bexley before crossing the northern border and Watling Street into the Hundred of Lesnes.

In 1797 the hundred was recorded as being divided into two half hundreds named Upper Ruxley and Lower Ruxley and under the jurisdiction of two constables.

As almost all the area of the Ruxley hundred has now been absorbed by the growth of London, and as civil parishes were abolished in Greater London, Knockholt which was in the south of Ruxley is the only parish of the Hundred that is a civil parish today. Knockholt is also the only part of this Kent Hundred that is in Kent today, although both would not have been true whilst Knockholt was in the London Borough of Bromley between 1965 and 1969.

== Parishes ==
The parishes that were recorded as being wholly within the Ruxley hundred were Chelsfield, Cudham, Downe, Farnborough, Foots Cray, Hayes, Keston, Knockholt, North Cray, Orpington, St Mary Cray, St Paul's Cray, and West Wickham. Also more parishes were recorded as being partly or sometimes within the hundred, they were: Bexley, Chislehurst, Chiddingstone, Hever, and Ruxley. The Parish of Chislehurst was partly within the hundred of Blackheath, and the parish of Bexley was partly in the Codsheath Hundred. Some records show that Ruxley, at least for a time had an exclave to the south containing parts of two parishes, Hever and Chiddingstone, which are in the geographical area of the Somerden Hundred and usually included in it. The settlement of Ruxley itself had its own parish until 1557 when it was absorbed into North Cray parish.

== Boundaries and neighbours ==
Ruxley occupied a central north-western position within the Sutton-at-Hone lathe, with borders with all but perhaps one of the other hundreds in the lathe. Ruxley was bordered by the hundreds of Little and Lesnes to the north, Dartford and Wilmington to the northeast, Axstane to the east and northeast (sometimes the hundred of Dartford and Wilmington and the hundred of Axstane were recorded as one hundred), Codsheath to the east and southeast Westerham and Edenbridge to the south; Ruxley's southwestern border was part of the Kent border with Surrey; Bromley and Beckenham bordered to the west and finally Blackheath to the northwest. The only hundred of the Sutton at Hone lathe that would have not have shared a common border with Ruxley was the Hundred of Somerden, the southernmost hundred of the lathe. However, the Hundred Ruxley was recorded as having an exclave several miles to the south in the geographical area of Somerden, containing parts of the Hever and Chiddingstone parishes, and if the exclave is included, it would also give Ruxley a border with the Somerden Hundred, and thus give Ruxley borders with all other hundreds in the lathe of Sutton-at-Hone.

When Greater London was created in 1965 what was previously Ruxley's eastern and southern border with the hundreds of Dartford and Wilmington, Axtane, Codsheath, and Westerham became roughly part of the border between the London Boroughs of Bromley and Bexley and the Kent districts of Sevenoaks and Dartford (although Knockholt left the London Borough of Bromley and became part of the Kent district of Sevenoaks in 1969, moving part of the border in that area). Watling Street ran past the north side of the Bexley parish, and part of it formed some of Ruxley's northern boundary with Lesnes.

== Watermills ==
Within the Hundred of Ruxley there were eight watermills on the River Cray. From source to downstream they were:

=== Orpington Mill ===
TQ 467 669
A Domesday site, Orpington Mill stood almost at the source of the River Cray. The mill building dated from the 18th century and was of traditional construction, with a timber frame clad with weatherboards under a peg tile roof. The mill was powered by an 11 by 9 feet (3.35 by 2.74 m) cast iron waterwheel carried on a cast iron axle which had replaced an earlier wooden one. Much of the machinery was of cast iron, including the wallower, great spur wheel and crown wheel. The upright shaft was of wood. The mill drove three pairs of millstones. Miller John Colgate had introduced steam power by the 1870s, and the tall chimney for the steam engine was known locally as "Colgate's Folly", as it did not function as well as intended. The mill was used as a store in its final years before its demolition in 1934 or 1935.

=== Snelling's Mill, St Mary Cray ===
TQ 472 677
A weir near the Black Boy hotel marked the site of a Domesday mill. The mill was demolished in 1872 and the area landscaped as part of the grounds of a public park. William Joynson bought the mill for £8,000 to enable the creation of the park.

The 13 ft 4 in (4.06 m) by 8 ft 6 in (2.59 m) cast iron waterwheel survived. It was used to drive a beam pump which supplied water to fountains and conservatories at "The Rookery". The wheel was intact until 1962, when the shed it was in was stripped of ivy and exposed. The wheel was then vandalised and had been cleared away by March 1964.

=== Upper Paper Mill, St Mary Cray ===
TQ 472 682
This mill stood opposite the Temple public house; it had an undershot waterwheel. Nicholas Townsend was mentioned in insurance records in 1757, and William Sims in 1771. In 1784 William Townsend was first mentioned as a paper maker in St Mary Cray. In 1786 Samuel Lay of Sittingbourne was the paper maker; he was described as a master papermaker in 1801. Martha Lay ordered two moulds in 1806. Martha Lay was running the mill in 1816; paper from this mill bore the watermark Martha Lay 1804. The mill ceased working in 1834.

=== Joynson's Mill, St Mary Cray ===
TQ 471 684
This was a corn mill which stood near St Mary Cray church. It was replaced by a paper mill, then a paper factory and in recent years by a warehouse complex.

In 1787 this mill was being run by Henry Brightly. John Hall was the owner in 1816. Charles Cowan was working at the mill in 1819, when the mill had two vats and was producing an estimated 1,500 pounds (680 kg) of paper a week. William Joynson took over in 1834. He had previously been at a paper mill in Snodland. Paper produced here bore the watermarks "Joynson Superfine" or "WJ&S" over "St Mary Cray Kent". In 1839, Joynson was granted a patent for watermarking paper produced by machine. The waterwheel was of cast iron construction and may have been overshot, as the head was some 8 to 9 feet (2.4 to 2.7 m). The mill was expanded in 1853, when a second machine was installed, enabling the steam driven mills to produce 25 to 30 tons of paper a week. William Joynson died in 1874 and the mills were left in trust to his two grandsons. One of them, William, drowned in 1875 leaving Edmund Hamborough Joynson as sole heir. Cowan mentions that the mill was producing an estimated 70,000 pounds (32,000 kg) of paper a week in 1878. Some 700 people were employed at the mill in 1881 and E. H. Joynson took over the mill in September 1882, expanding it the following year with a new steam engine and machinery. An engraving of the mill in 1891 can be seen here. Joynson produced only high quality writing papers. In the late 1890s, a dryer was sold to Nash's and installed in their mill at St Pauls Cray. Edmund Joynson took his son into partnership shortly before World War One. The firm became William Joynson & Son. In 1914, Joynson's paper was used in the first £1 and 10/- banknotes issued by the Bank of England. Edmund H Joynson retired in 1930 and the mills were taken over by Messrs Wiggins Teape & Co. who promptly closed the mills in order to rebuild them. 350 people were made redundant, and only 200 were employed in the reopened factory. The paper factory made greaseproof and vegetable parchment paper. The mill reopened in April 1933 as the Vegetable Parchment Mills (Delcroix) Ltd. The production of "vulcanised fibre" began around 1943. In 1963 the mill was the home of the National Paper Museum The mill closed in 1967 and the paper museum collection was transferred to the Museum of Science and Industry in Manchester.

=== St Paul's Cray Mill ===
TQ 474 694
In 1718 this mill had two waterwheels driving machinery for dressing leather in oil, and a third for corn milling. The mill was replaced by a paper mill, powered by a turbine.

=== Foots Cray (Nash's) Paper Mill ===
TQ 474 694
This paper mill replaced the earlier corn mill. Papermaking had been established by 1742. A steam engine had been installed by around 1820. It was used in the 1830s as a meeting place for Baptists. In 1845, Mary Ann Nash inherited the profits and rents of the mill until her sons came of age under the terms of her husband's will. Mary Ann Nash died on 7 June 1852. Thomas Nash enlarged the mill in 1853. After his death at the age of 21, his brother William was manager under the trustees until he came of age in 1857. William Nash was married twice, and had five children. In 1870 they moved from the Mill House to a new house called Crayfield House. It is recorded that the axle of the waterwheel protruded into the kitchen of the Mill House. William Nash died on 11 September 1879 and the mill was in the hands of trustees again. In 1898 a 250-horsepower (about 190 kW) double-expansion condensing steam engine by Pollitt & Wigzell was installed, along with a second paper machine. Shortly after this a secondhand dryer was purchased from Joynson's mill to replace one that had proved unsuitable. By 1954 the site was a factory complex. It had been demolished by 1986.

=== Foot's Cray Mill ===
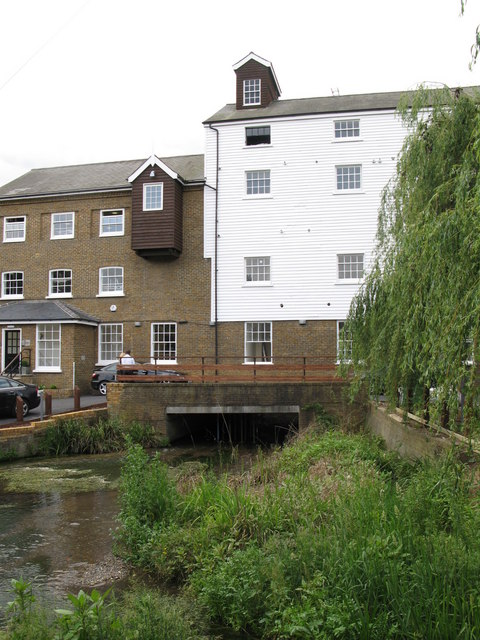
The Old Mill PH

Foot's Cray mill was a paper mill. By the 1870s it was used as a fabric printing works. In 1900 the mill was being used as a factory making photographic film. Its final function was the processing of silk. The paper mill had two cast iron overshot waterwheels in parallel. Each was 15 feet (4.57 m) diameter. One was 10 feet 6 inches (3.20 m) wide and the other was 5 feet (1.52 m) wide. The mill was demolished in 1929.

=== Old Mill, Bexley ===
TQ 496 735
A Domesday site, one of three in Bexley. This was a corn mill. In 1255, the miller, Auxellus, was censured for allowing the escape of a suspected murderer. A millstone was bought for 55s.6d. in 1300. The last building on the site dated from 1779, when the low breast shot waterwheel of 14 by 10 feet (4.27 by 3.05 m) powered four pairs of millstones. It was owned by the Cannon family from 1839 to 1907. Stephen Cannon was the first of the Cannon family, also running mills on the River Darent. The miller in 1872 was Stephen Cannon (son), who concentrated the business at Bexley, the mills on the Darent being sold. A steam engine was installed in 1884, the tall chimney was built by a Mr Hart from Lancashire, who fell from the top whilst doing repairs and lived to tell the tale as his fall was broken by the roof of the engine house. The Cannon family sold Bexley mill in 1907. The mill was used in its latter days for making sacks. A picture of the mill can be seen here. The mill was burnt down on 12 May 1966 and was replaced by the Old Mill PH, a pub with a mill theme.

== District replacement table ==
Parish	Districts before 1934/35	District 1934/35-1965	Districts 1965-today	Notes
Knockholt	Bromley Rural District (1894–1934)	Orpington Urban District (1934–1965)	London Borough of Bromley (1965–1969) Sevenoaks Rural District (1969–1974); Kent District of Sevenoaks (1974-)	Knockholt was in Greater London from 1965 to 1969
Cudham	Bromley Rural District (1894–1934)	Orpington Urban District (1934–1965)	London Borough of Bromley (1965-)	
Downe	Bromley Rural District (1894–1934)	Orpington Urban District (1934–1965)	London Borough of Bromley (1965-)	
Farnborough	Bromley Rural District (1894–1934)	Orpington Urban District (1934–1965)	London Borough of Bromley (1965-)	
Keston	Bromley Rural District (1894–1934)	Orpington Urban District (1934–1965)	London Borough of Bromley (1965-)	
Orpington	Bromley Rural District (1894–1934)	Orpington Urban District (1934–1965)	London Borough of Bromley (1965-)	
St Mary Cray	Bromley Rural District (1894–1934)	Orpington Urban District (1934–1965)	London Borough of Bromley (1965-)	
St Paul's Cray	Bromley Rural District (1894–1934)	Orpington Urban District (1934–1965)	London Borough of Bromley (1965-)	
West Wickham	Bromley Rural District (1894–1934)	Orpington Urban District (1934–1965)	London Borough of Bromley (1965-)	
Hayes	Bromley Rural District (1894–1934)	Municipal Borough of Bromley (1934–1965)	London Borough of Bromley (1965-)	
North Cray	Bromley Rural District (1894–1934)	Chislehurst and Sidcup Urban District (1934–1965)	London Borough of Bexley (1965-)	Ruxley was its own parish but was absorbed into North Cray parish in 1557
Ruxley	North Cray Parish (1557–1894) Bromley Rural District (1894–1934)	Chislehurst and Sidcup Urban District (1934–1965)	London Borough of Bexley (1965-)	Ruxley was its own parish but was absorbed into North Cray parish in 1557
Foots Cray	Bromley Rural District (1894–1921) Sidcup Urban District (1921–1934)	Chislehurst and Sidcup Urban District (1934–1965)	London Borough of Bexley (1965-)	Footscray parish was later called Sidcup parish
Chislehurst	Bromley Rural District (1894–1900) Chislehurst Urban District (1900–1934)	Chislehurst and Sidcup Urban District (1934–1965)	London Borough of Bromley (1965-)	Chislehurst parish was also recorded as being partly in the Hundred of Blackheath
Bexley	Bexley Urban District (1894–1935)	Municipal Borough of Bexley (1935–1965)	London Borough of Bexley (1965-)	Bexley parish also was recorded as being partly in the Codsheath hundred
Chiddingstone	Sevenoaks Rural District (1894–1974)		Kent District of Sevenoaks (1974-)	Chiddingstone and Hever were within an exclave to the south and partly in the hundred of Somerden
Hever	Sevenoaks Rural District (1894–1974)		Kent District of Sevenoaks (1974-)	Chiddingstone and Hever were within an exclave to the south and partly in the hundred of Somerden
