= Codsheath Hundred =

Historical Hundred of Kent, England

Codsheath
- Former subdivision of England
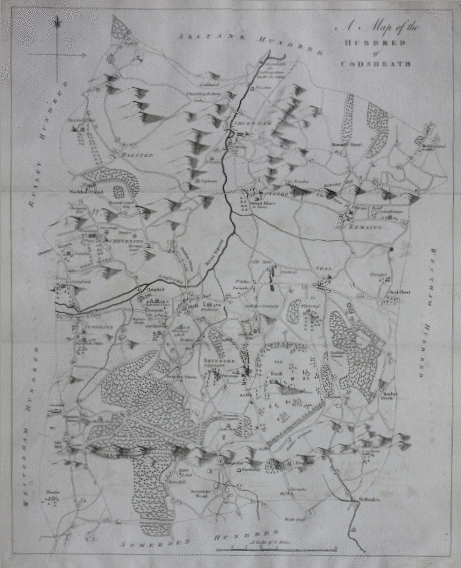
- Map of the Hundred of Codseath by Edward Hasted published, Canterbury (1778) included in The History and Topographical Survey of the County of Kent (1778–99) (Hasted)
- Area
  - 1831 (census): 37,720 acres (153 km^{2})
  - 1831 (census): 37,720 acres (153 km^{2})
- Population
  - 1831: 12,709 (6,394 female, 6,315 male)
  - 1831: 12,709
- History
  - Abolished: 1894 (obsolete)
  - Succeeded by: Sevenoaks Rural District, Sevenoaks Urban District
- Status: obsolete
- Government: hundred
  - HQ: Riverhead
- Subdivisions
  - Type: Parishes
  - Units: Shoreham, Halstead, Otford, Kemsing, Seale, Sevenoaks, Sundridge, and parts of Chevening, Leigh, Speldhurst, Woodland in Kingsdown Bexley

Codsheath was a hundred, a historical land division, in the county of Kent, England. It occupied the eastern part of the Lathe of Sutton-at-Hone, in the west division of Kent. Codsheath was also recorded as "Codsede" in ancient records. Today the area that was the Codsheath Hundred is part of the Sevenoaks District of Kent that includes the town of Sevenoaks and surrounding area. The Hundred of Codsheath was included in the Domesday Book of 1086, that records it as having 203 houses, 44 in Sundridge and 159 in Otford. The River Darent flowed through the Codsheath Hundred, generally in a northeast direction. Several watermills were constructed on the river within the hundred, in the villages of Sundridge, Otford, Shoreham and Chevening.

In the 1831 census, Codsheath was recorded as having an area of 37,720 acres (153 km^{2}) and a population of 12,709, of which 6,394 were female, 6,315 were male, and 3,239 were males aged 20 and over. The same census recorded the population as belonging to 2,437 families living in 2,211 houses, and that 1,295 of these families worked in agriculture, and 649 families worked in trade, manufacturing, or handicraft.

Codsheath, like the other hundreds in Kent, became less significant gradually over time, and although never formally abolished, it was obsolete by 1894 with the creation of new districts. In 1894 the area of the Codsheath Hundred became the Sevenoaks Urban District and part of Sevenoaks Rural District, which in turn merged with each other in 1974 to become the Sevenoaks District which remains up to present day.

== Parishes ==
Parishes that were recorded as being in the Hundred of Codsheath were Shoreham, Halstead, Otford, Kemsing, Seale, Sevenoaks, and Sundridge, and also parts of Chevening, Leigh, Speldhurst, and Woodland in Kingsdown/West Kingsdown, which also had parts in other hundreds; and also two other parishes that there sometimes, partly recorded as belonging to the Codsheath hundred, Brasted to the west, which later became a hundred of its own and Bexley, in an exclave to the north which had also been recorded as belonging to the Hundred of Ruxley. In 1797 the parish churches of Shoreham, Halstead, Otford, Kemsing, Seal, Sevenoaks, Chevening, Sundridge and Woodland in Kingsdown were recorded as belonging to the Codsheath Hundred and the churches of Leigh and Speldhurst to the Somerden Hundred to the south.

== Boundaries and neighbours ==
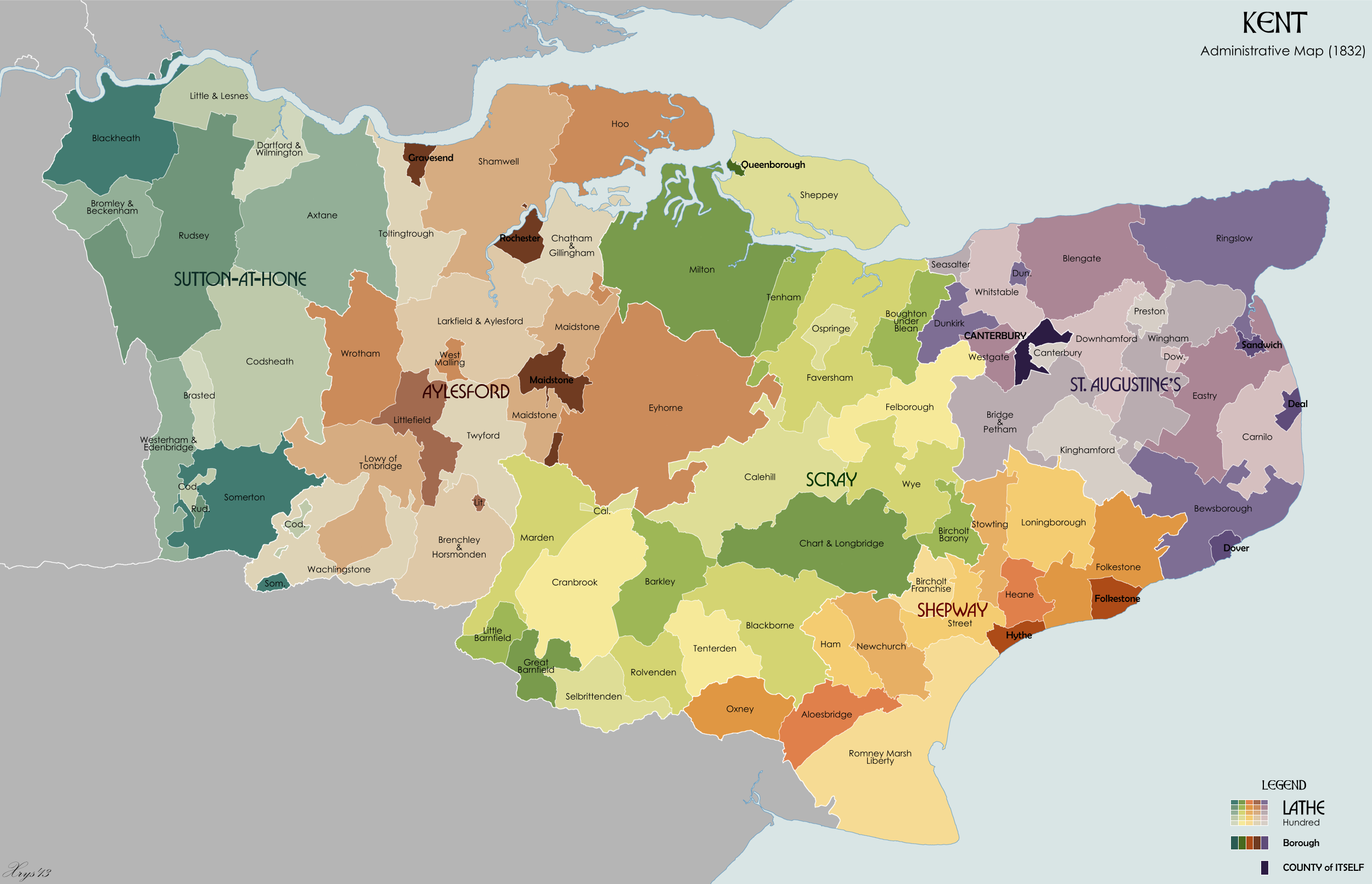
Map showing the location and boundaries of the hundreds of Kent as they were in 1832, showing the exclaves of Codsheath and other hundreds

The Hundred of Codsheath was approximately 10 miles long north to south, and 8 miles wide east to west, occupying the central and eastern area of the Lathe of Sutton at Hone. Codsheath Hundred bordered six other hundreds, four in the Sutton-at-Hone Lathe, and two of the Aylesford Lathe to the east. Hundreds that bordered Codsheath were Somerden to the south, the small hundred of Brasted to the west, the Hundred of Ruxley to the northwest, Axstane Hundred to the northeast, all within the Sutton-at-Hone; and the Aylesford hundreds of Wrothham to the east, and Lowy of Tunbridge to the southeast. Before Brasted became its own hundred, it was a parish of Codsheath, at this time the western boundary of Codsheath Hundred would have been with the Westerham and Edinbridge Hundred, also in the Sutton-at-Hone Lathe.
