= Shepp =

Shepp may refer to:

- Carol Shepp McCain or Carol McCain (born 1938), former model, director of the White House Visitors Office, and event planner
- Archie Shepp (born 1937), American jazz saxophonist
- Lawrence Shepp (1936–2013), American mathematician, specializing in statistics and computational tomography
- Shepparton, a city in Victoria, Australia with a population of around 50,000 people

== See also ==
- XYZ inequality, also called the Fishburn-Shepp inequality, the inequality for the number of extensions of partial orders to linear orders
- Sepp (disambiguation)
- Shep (disambiguation)
- Sheppard (disambiguation)
- Sheppey (disambiguation)
