= Lessness =

Lessness or Lesnes may refer to:

- Lessness Heath, a district in the London Borough of Bexley
  - Little and Lesnes Hundred, an ancient land division in Kent, England; referred to as Lessness in some records
  - Lesnes Abbey, a ruined abbey, in Abbey Wood, southeast London, England
  - Lesnes Abbey Woods, an area of ancient woodland in southeast London, England located near, and named after, the ruined Lesnes Abbey
- Lessness (short story), a 1969 short story by Samuel Beckett
