= Somerden Hundred =

Historical Hundred of Kent, England

Coordinates: 51.183°N 0.110°E

Somerden
- Former subdivision of England
- 1086–1894
- Area
  - 1831: 13,650 acres (55 km^{2})
  - 1831: 13,650 acres (55 km^{2})
- Population
  - 1831: 3,924
  - 1831: 3,924
- History
  - Created: after 1086
  - Abolished: 1894 (obsolete)
  - Succeeded by: Sevenoaks Rural District
- Status: obsolete
- Government: hundred
  - HQ: Somerden Green and Edenbridge
- History
  - Established: 1086
  - Disestablished: 1894
- Subdivisions
  - Type: Parishes
  - Units: Cowden, Penhurst, Leigh, and parts of Hever, Chiddingstone, Speldhurst, Edinbridge, and Chevening

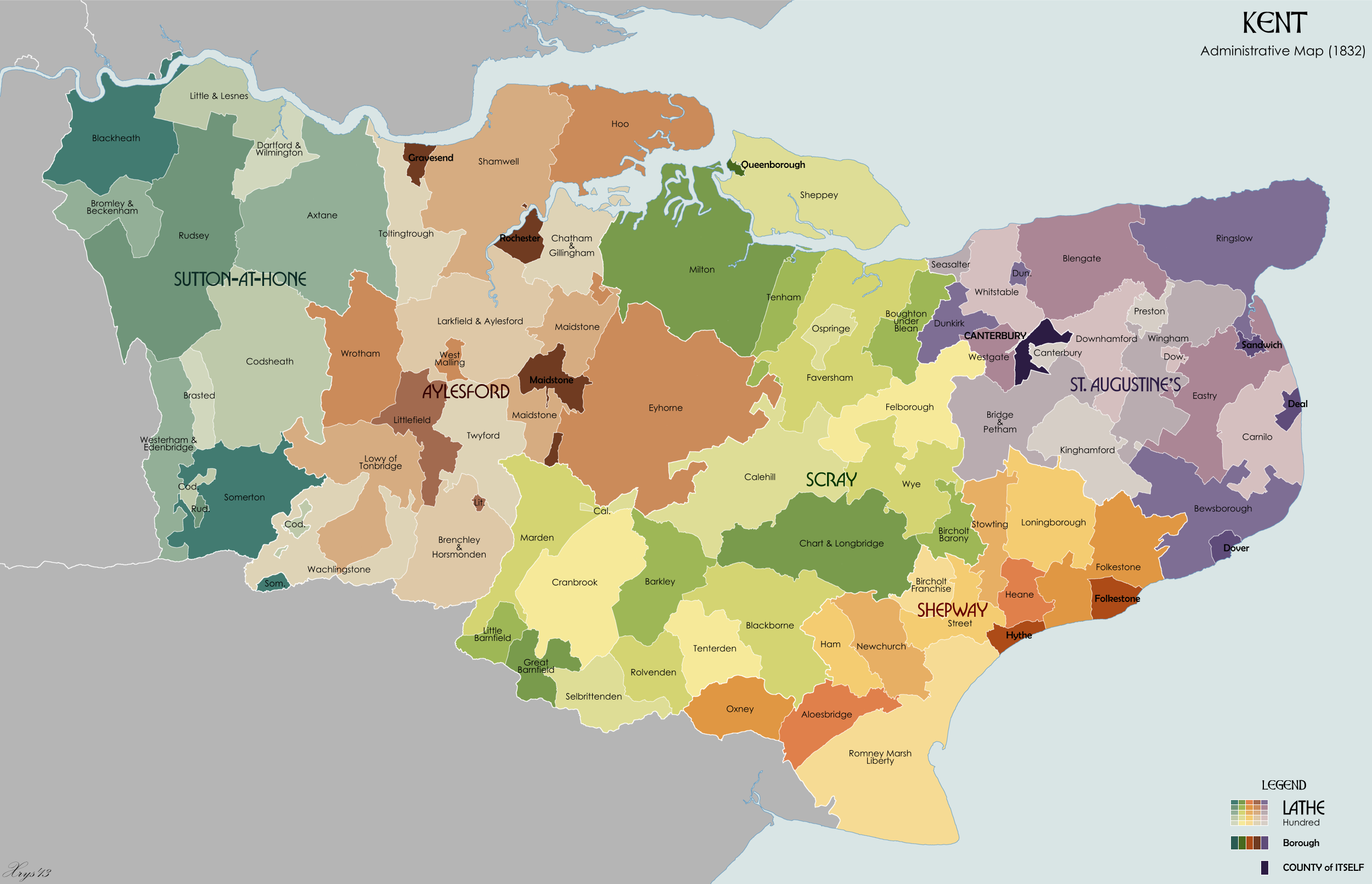
Map showing the location and boundaries of the hundreds of Kent as they were in 1832, showing the exclaves of Somerden and other hundreds. Somerden was in southwest Kent

Somerden was a hundred, a historical land division, in the county of Kent, England. It occupied the southwest corner of Kent, in the southern part of the Lathe of Sutton-at-Hone, in the west division of Kent. The hundred was one of the last to be created in Kent, unlike the majority of Kent hundreds, it was not formally constituted in the Domesday Book of 1086, but came into being sometime after. Today the area is mostly rural and located in the southern part of the Sevenoaks District, south of Sevenoaks and west of Tonbridge. Somerden Hundred was approximately 7.5 miles (12.1 km) wide east to west, and 5.5 miles (8.9 km) long north to south, and had a small exclave about 1 mile (1.6 km) out from its south east corner. In the 1831 census Somerden was recorded as having an area of 13,650 acres (55 km^{2}). The population in that census was recorded as 3,924, of which 2,078 were male and 1,846 were female, who belonged to 734 families living in 567 houses.

In the later years of its existence the Oxted Line and Redhill to Tonbridge Line railway lines were constructed through the hundred. Somerden, like the other hundreds in Kent, became less significant gradually over time, and although never formally abolished, it was obsolete by 1894 with the creation of new districts. The majority of Somerden became part of the Sevenoaks Rural District in 1894, which in turn merged with the Sevenoaks Urban District in 1974 to become the Sevenoaks District which remains up to present day.

== Parishes ==
Parishes that were recorded as being in the hundred were Cowden, and Penhurst, and parts of Leigh, Hever, Chiddingstone, Speldhurst, Edinbridge. and Chevening Only Cowden, and Penhurst were always recorded as being completely within Somerden, the other parishes had parts in Somerden and parts in other hundreds. Somerden existed for several centuries, the borders of the parishes or which hundred they were considered a part of, changed slightly over the years of its existence, not all censuses and other sources list the same parishes. The Hundred of Codsheath, to the north of Somerden, was sometimes recorded as including parts of the Leigh parish. The parishes of Hever, Chiddingstone were in the geographic area of Somerden and mostly within the hundred, but parts of those parishes were also sometimes recorded as belonging to the hundreds of Codsheath and Ruxley to the north in exclaves of those hundreds. Somerden was also recorded to have an exclave of its own to the east, containing part of the parish of Spelhurst, which was in the geographic area of the Wachlingstone hundred which the other part the parish belonged to. The parish in the northwest of Somerden, was Edinbridge and was recorded as partly belonging to the Somerden Hundred, and partly belonging to a smaller hundred named, Westerham and Edinbridge. Chevening, the northernmost parish of the hundred, was sometimes recorded as part of Somerden like in the 1831 census, but was also recorded at other times as belonging to the Codsheath Hundred. The parish churches of Hever, Cowden, Chiddingstone, Penhurst, Leigh and Speldhurst were within the Somerden Hundred, but the parish churches of Chevening and Eatonbridge were within other hundreds.
