= Little and Lesnes Hundred =

Historical Hundred of Kent, England

Coordinates: 51.486°N 0.111°E

Little and Lesnes
- Former subdivision of England
- 1086–1876
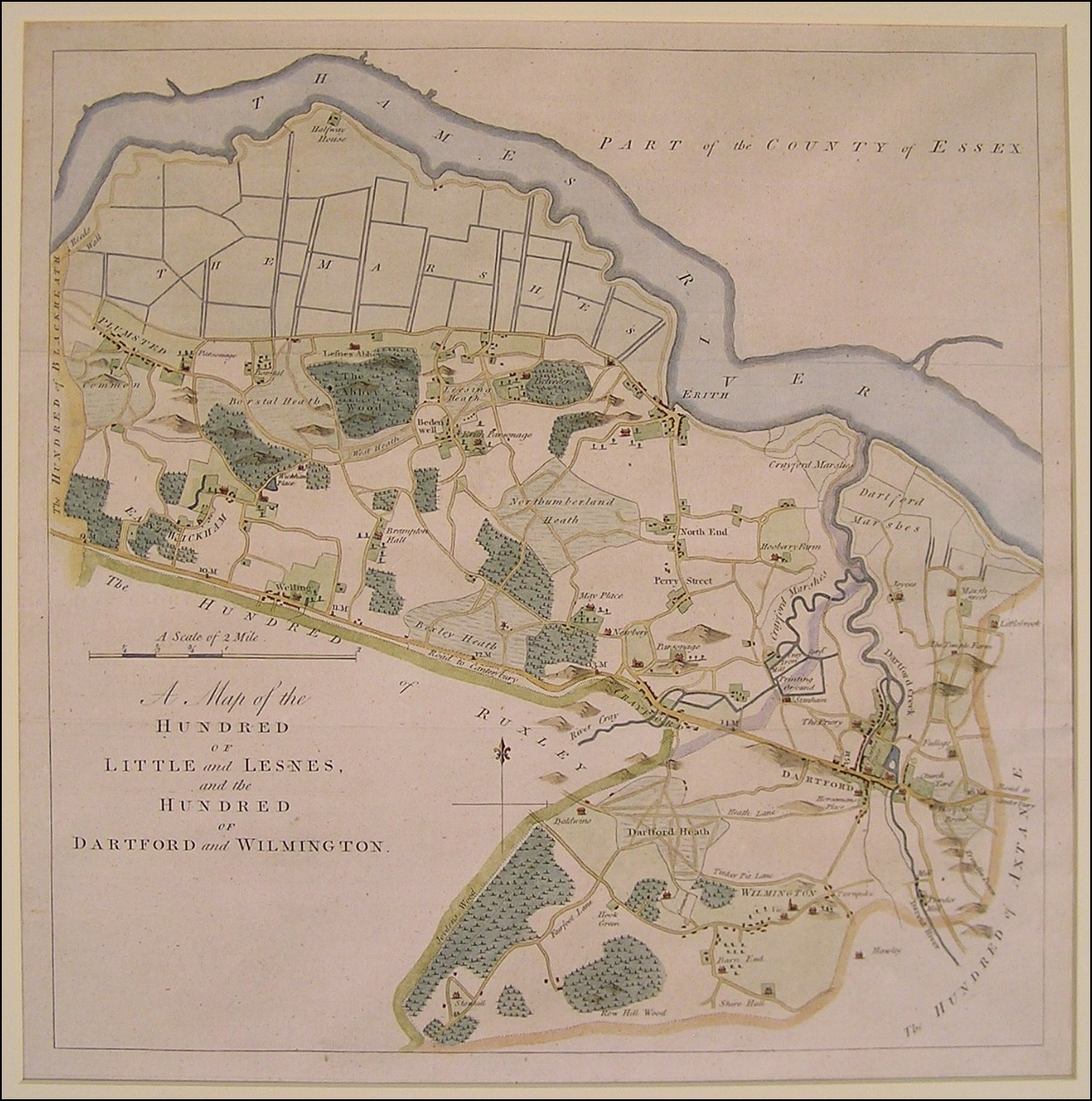
- Map of the Hundred of Little and Lesnes and the Hundred of Dartford and Wilmington by Edward Hasted published, by W Bristow Canterbury (1778 and 1797) included in The History and Topographical Survey of the County of Kent (1778–99) (Hasted)
- Area
  - 1831: 10,410 acres (42 km^{2})
  - 1831: 10,410 acres (42 km^{2})
- Population
  - 1086: ? (153 households)
  - 1831: 6,699
- History
  - Created: Ancient (before 1086)
  - Abolished: 1876-1894 (obsolete)
  - Succeeded by: Plumstead and East Wickham: County of London (1889) and Metropolitan Borough of Woolwich (1900) then London Borough of Greenwich (1965); Erith: Municipal Borough of Erith (1876) then London Borough of Bexley (1965); Crayford: Dartford Rural District (1894) then Crayford Urban District (1920) then London Borough of Bexley (1965)
- Status: Obsolete
- Government: Hundred
  - HQ: Lesnes Heath
- History
  - Established: 1086
  - Disestablished: 1876
- Subdivisions
  - Type: Parishes
  - Units: Crayford, East Wickham*, Erith, Plumstead, (*Before 1854 East Wickham was part of Plumstead parish)

Little and Lesnes was a hundred, a historical land division, in the county of Kent, England. It occupied the northern part of the Lathe of Sutton-at-Hone in the west division of Kent. Little and Lesnes was the northernmost hundred in the whole county of Kent. The hundred existed since ancient times, before the Domesday Book of 1086, until it was made obsolete with the creation of new districts at the end of the nineteenth century.

Today the area that was the Hundred of Little and Lesnes is suburban London, covering the northeast corner of the Royal Borough of Greenwich and the northern part of the London Borough of Bexley, with the River Thames to the north, and Watling Street to the south; and roughly centred on the area of Abbey Wood. Little and Lesnes Hundred was approximately, 4 miles (6.5 km) across north to south, and about 7 miles (11.25 km) wide east to west.

== Name ==
The name of the hundred changed over the centuries, and was also linked with names of localities within it. In the Domesday Book of 1086 through the mid-13th century it was called the "Hundred of Litelai", which became "Litlelee", then in 1347 it was recorded as the "Hundred of Litley". By around 1400 it started being referred to as the "Hundred of Little and Lesnes" which continued to be its name for the next 500 years up until the creation of new districts at the end of the nineteenth century when the hundred became obsolete. The spelling "Lessness" is also used at least from the early 19th century, and in some records, the word "Little" was not used in the name and the hundred was referred to by the shorter name "Hundred of Lessness". In the 1831 census, "Lessness" was recorded as being the preferred name, but "Little and Lessness" was still recorded as an accepted alternative name. The hundred also shares its name with the hamlet of Lessness, Lessness Park, Lessness Heath, and Lesnes Abbey, which in turn gave its name to Lesnes Abbey Woods and Abbey Wood.

== Boundaries and neighbours ==
The Hundred of Little and Lesnes occupied the northernmost part of the Lathe of Sutton-at-Hone, located in West Kent, and was the northernmost hundred in the whole county of Kent. It shared land borders with three other hundreds of the Sutton-at-Hone Lathe, Blackheath Hundred to the west and southwest and the Hundred of Ruxley to the south, both of which were larger than Little and Lesnes; to the east and southeast was the Hundred of Dartford and Wilmington which was smaller. The northern boundary of Little and Lesnes was the River Thames and across the river to the north was the county of Essex. In the Thames Little and Lesnes shared borders with the Essex hundreds of Becontree to the north and northwest, and Chafford to the northeast and also with the Royal Liberty of Havering in Essex to the northeast. Watling Street formed much of the southern boundary between Little and Lesnes and the Hundred of Ruxley. To the east the River Cray and the River Darent formed some of the eastern boundary, between Little and Lesnes and the Hundred of Dartford and Wilmington; the boundary at the two rivers remains as a boundary today, but now between the London Borough of Bexley and the Kent Borough of Dartford.

== Parishes and places ==
The Hundred of Little and Lesnes contained four parishes and their churches. Plumstead in the west, Erith in the centre, Crayford in the east and East Wickham which was by far the smallest parish in the hundred in the south. Before the 19th century the parish of Wickham was sometimes recorded as having a chapel that was annexed to the parish and church of Plumtead, and not fully its own parish. East Wickham, although having some powers before, became an official parish in its own right, completely separate from Plumstead parish in 1854.

In addition to the parishes and villages of Plumstead, East Wickham, Crayford, and Erith, other places that were located in Little and Lesnes Hundred were: Northumberland Heath, Belvedere, Lessness Heath, Abbey Wood, North End, West Heath, Howbury, and the northern parts of Welling and Bexleyheath. Thamesmead is in the area covered by the hundred, but did not appear as a locality until many years after the hundred was obsolete. Lesnes Abbey, Lesnes Abbey Woods, and Erith Marshes were also located within the borders of the hundred.

== History and records ==
The hundred was established in ancient times, like most Kent hundreds it already existed when the Domesday Book was compiled in 1086. The hundred was recorded in the Domesday Book as the Hundred of Litlelee, the largest settlement in the hundred at this time was Lessness. In 1086 the Domesday Book recorded 153 households being present in 4 populated places, 68 households in Lessness, 43 in Plumstead, 34 in Crayford and 8 in Howbury.

In the 1831 census, the area of Little and Lesnes Hundred was recorded as 10,410 acres (42 km^{2}) In that same census a population of 6,699 was recorded, of which 3,256 were female, 3,443 were male and 1,657 were males over 20. The population in 1831 was recorded as belonging to 1,432 families living in 1,165 houses of which 473 families were involved in agriculture, and 491 families were involved in trade, manufacture, or handicraft.

In 1849 the North Kent Line was extended, and run through Little and Lesnes Hundred, connecting Kent to London. From west to east, stations that were constructed on the line were: Plumstead, Abbey Wood, Belvedere and Erith. Erith and Abbey Wood were constructed and opened in 1849, same year as the line was extended, Belvedere and Plumstead were opened a decade later in 1859. Slade Green railway station was also opened on the line in 1900 to the east of Erith, but the hundred was obsolete by that time. On 1 September 1866 Crayford railway station and the Dartford Loop Line were opened, there were several stations on this line, but only Crayford was within the borders of the hundred.

=== Abolition and succeeding districts ===
In 1889 the western half of Little and Lesnes Hundred became part of the County of London, then in 1965 Greater London was created, which encompassed the whole area of the former hundred. Little and Lesnes along with most other hundreds became obsolete at the end of the nineteenth century when new districts were created following the Local Government Act 1888. The western half of Little and Lesnes Hundred containing the Plumstead and East Wickham parishes became part of the County of London in 1889. In 1900 the County of London was divided into new boroughs and Plumstead and East Wickham were then part of the new Metropolitan Borough of Woolwich. In 1965 Greater London was created, Plumstead and East Wickham became part of the London Borough of Greenwich.

Erith and Crayford remained in Kent within numerous districts until the creation of Greater London in 1965. Erith parish become part of the Local Government District of Erith in 1876, which in turn became an urban district in 1894, which then became the Municipal Borough of Erith in 1938, and then became part of the newly created London Borough of Bexley in 1965. In 1894 Crayford became part of the new district Dartford Rural District, but then split from it on 1 October 1920 to become a district of its own, the Crayford Urban District; that district lasted until 1965 when it too became part of the newly formed London Borough of Bexley.

=== Succeeding districts ===
Parish before 1854	Parish 1854-1876	Parish/district 1876-1889	Parish/district 1889-1894	District 1894-1900	District 1900-1920	District 1920-1938	District 1938-1965	District 1965–present
Plumstead parish, Lesnes Hundred, Kent (ancient-1889)			County of London (before boroughs were used 1889-1900)		Metropolitan Borough of Woolwich, County of London (1900-1965)			London Borough of Greenwich, Greater London (1965–present) (renamed Royal Borough of Greenwich in 2012)
East Wickham, chapalry of Plumstead parish, Lesnes Hundred, Kent (ancient-1854)	East Wickham parish, Lesnes Hundred, Kent (Parish separate from Plumstead 1854-1889)		County of London (before boroughs were used 1889-1900)		Metropolitan Borough of Woolwich, County of London (1900-1965)			London Borough of Greenwich, Greater London (1965–present) (renamed Royal Borough of Greenwich in 2012)
Erith parish, Lesnes Hundred, Kent (ancient-1876)		Local Government District of Erith, Kent (1876-1894)		Urban District of Erith, Kent (1894-1938)			Municipal Borough of Erith, Kent (1938-1965)	London Borough of Bexley, Greater London (1965–present)
Crayford parish, Lesnes Hundred, Kent (ancient-1894)				Dartford Rural District, Kent (1894–1920)		Crayford Urban District, Kent (1920-1965)		London Borough of Bexley, Greater London (1965–present)
