= Otford =

Village in Kent, England

Coordinates: 51.30969°N 0.18657°E

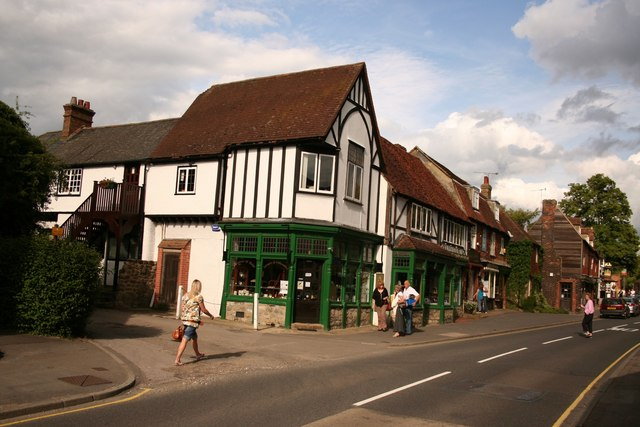
- High Street in Otford, just along from the central pond, 2007

- Location within Kent
- Population: 3,551 (2021 Census)
- OS grid reference: TQ525590
- District: Sevenoaks
- Shire county: Kent
- Region: South East
- Country: England
- Sovereign state: United Kingdom
- Post town: Sevenoaks
- Postcode district: TN14
- Dialling code: 01959
- Police: Kent
- Fire: Kent
- Ambulance: South East Coast
- UK Parliament: Sevenoaks

Otford is a village and civil parish in the Sevenoaks District of Kent, England. It lies on the River Darent, 3 miles (5 km) north of Sevenoaks. Otford's four churches are the Anglican Church of St Bartholomew in the village centre, the Otford Methodist Church, the Most Holy Trinity Roman Catholic Church, and the Otford Evangelical Church. By the village pond, there are pubs, cafes and shops. The village has three schools, Otford Primary School, St Michael's Prep School, and Russell House.

== History ==
Otford's earliest history and archaeology shows occupation for at least 3,000 years. Occupants have included Iron Age farmers, Romans, archbishops, and royalty, and major events include two battles. The etymology of the village name is disputed: an article in the Kent and Sussex Courier claims that Otford is a contraction of Ottansford, meaning the ford of Otta, a local man of importance.

=== Roman ===
A Roman villa in what is now Otford was abandoned during the 4th century, approximately 1700 years ago. The remains were re-discovered and excavated during the 1930s, and again in 2015 by the West Kent Archeological Society. It is at least twice the size of nearby Lullingstone villa.

=== Saxon ===
Otford was made part of the Hundred of Codsheath, one of the nine Hundreds making up the Lathe of Sutton at Hone in about the 6th century AD. Lathes were Saxon administrative regions.

From c. 650 to 750, during the early medieval period, Polhill Anglo-Saxon cemetery was used as a place of burial. The archaeologist Brian Philp suggested that the community who buried their dead at Polhill likely lived at Otford, noting that from the centre of the village, the cemetery was visible.

The name Otford may be a contraction of Otterford, possibly derived from Offa, the King of Mercia who fought the Kentish Saxons in 776 at the Battle of Otford. The History and Topographical Survey of the County of Kent: Volume 3, published 1797, indicates that Otford's Saxon name was Ottanford. It further notes that: "In 791, Offa, king of Mercia, whose gifts to the British churches and monasteries in general were great and munificent, gave Otteford to the church of Canterbury."

Priest Werhard, kinsman of archbishop Wulfred briefly took possession of Otteford, but was commanded by the archbishop to return it to Canterbury in 830. It remained so until 1070.

The chronicler monk John of Worcester told that Edmund Ironside brought his army to Kent, and fought the Danes at the Battle of Otford in 1016. The Danes apparently fled to Sheppey.

=== Norman ===
Otford is mentioned in the Domesday Book of 1086, where it shows that the Archbishop of Canterbury possessed 8 mills in the village, which is referred to as Otefort.

The History and Topographical Survey of the County of Kent: Volume 3 notes that the Textus Roffensis or Tome of Rochester, published between 1122 and 1124, uses Otteford as the name.

The Gough Map of Great Britain, dated between 1355 and 1366, shows Otford labelled with its current name, but on King Henry VIII's map Angliae Figura, the village is known as Otforde.

=== Middle Ages ===
In 1514, Archbishop William Warham replaced an existing ecclesiastical building with Otford Palace, and in 1519, King Henry VIII stayed in the palace. Apparently, he liked it so much, Archbishop Thomas Cranmer felt compelled to give it to the king in 1537.

=== Late Middle Ages ===
The History and Topographical Survey of the County of Kent says that: "Otford Parish is about nine miles in circumference, and contains about two thousand four hundred acres of land, of which about seventy are woodland. It lies for the greatest part of it in a low damp situation, which makes it far from being pleasant, and gives it a lonely and gloomy appearance, and in all probability it would have been but little known had it not been for the residence of the archbishops at it for such a length of time."

=== Victorian ===
During the 19th century, Otford was still part of the Hundred of Codsheath, albeit with a population of 798 in 1841. In 1887, the Scottish theologian and historian John Hunt was appointed Vicar of St Bartholomew’s Anglican church.

In 1882, Otford Station (see "Railway", below) opened for passenger traffic towards London and Sevenoaks.

=== 20th century ===
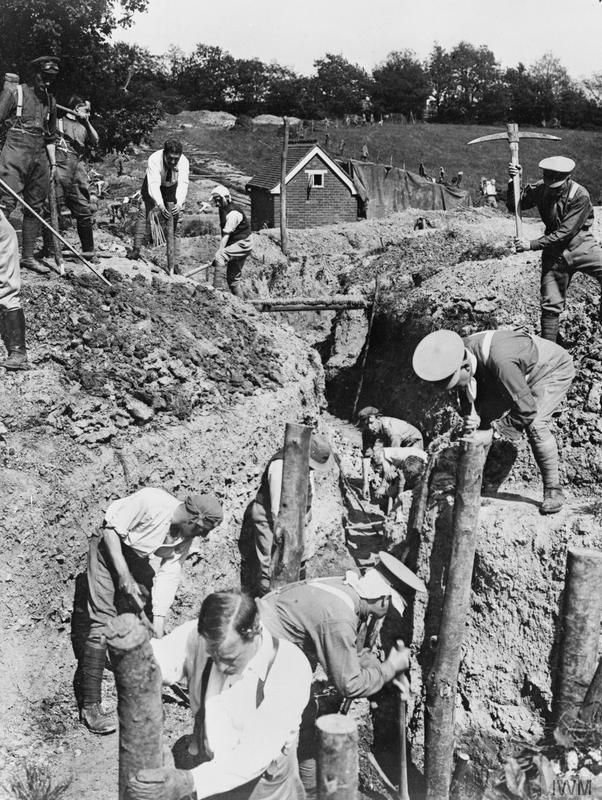
Army at work, 1914–1918

Otford included the settlement of Dunton Green until 1909, when it was split off into a separate parish. In 1924, the Otford Watermill, dating from 1541, burnt down. In the late 1940s, Otford Medical Practice was formed and is now located at Lennards Avenue. On 16 January 1975, the village pond was granted listed building status. In 1999, Otford Medical Practice extended its reach to include a new branch surgery in Kemsing.

=== Recent history ===
In 2002, Otford won the Kent Village of the Year competition; the results were broadcast live on BBC Radio Kent, and reported in the Kent Messenger newspaper.

The census of 2011 lists Otford and Shoreham as having 4,595 residents (cf 798 in 1841, see above), in 1,852 households. The area is given as 2,147 hectares (cf 2,400 acres in the 1797 survey). The population density is averaged at 2.1 per hectare (0.85 per acre); however, this is perhaps misleading, as most housing is clustered.

In 2012, Otford was formally twinned with Neufchâtel-Hardelot, under a Twinning Charter signed in Neufchâtel-Hardelot on 17 September 2011 and Otford on 31 March 2012.

The pond one-way system was declared Roundabout of the Year by the Roundabout Appreciation Society in 2013.

In 2013 and 2014, Otford suffered considerable flooding from the river Darent. An assessment in 2011 by KCC highlighted significant risk for Otford. The risks were not overstated, with some shops out of business for several months.

== Skyline ==
Notable landmarks are the Archbishop's Palace, the duck-pond one-way system and the model of the Solar System, at a scale of 1:4,595,700,000, or just under 1 km (0.6 mi) from the Sun to Pluto when Pluto is at its perihelion. The Anglican parish church of Otford is dedicated to Saint Bartholomew. Otford Methodist Church, Otford Evangelical Free Church and the Roman Catholic Church of the Most Holy Trinity also serve the village; the buildings were registered for marriages in 1936, 1959 and 1981 respectively.

== Transport ==
=== Railway ===
Otford station is located in the village and has services northbound to central London via Bromley South to Victoria, Blackfriars and St Pancras and southbound to Ashford International via Maidstone East and to Sevenoaks. Otford is served by two railway companies, Southeastern and Thameslink Railway. The railway station has a substantial, chargeable, car park. Some parts of north western Otford are closer to Dunton Green station, which has services northbound to Charing Cross and Cannon Street as well as to Sevenoaks. This railway station also has a chargeable car park.

=== Road ===
Otford lies on the A225, a main road between Dartford and Sevenoaks. The presence of the site of a Roman Villa, in addition to the remains of an ancient trackway, suggests that this road has a long history. The High Street, C296, forms a junction with the A225 at the one-way system which encloses the pond. The M26 Wrotham Spur uses the valley here as part of its route, closely following the boundary between Otford and Dunton Green. M25 access from Otford is effected most easily via the A25 into Sevenoaks and M25 Junction 15, Chevening Interchange.

=== Buses ===
- 2 to Swanley via Shoreham, Eynsford & Farningham or to Sevenoaks. Two journeys a day in each direction, Mondays to Saturdays only. Operated by Go-Coach.

=== Footpaths ===
The village is a key stopping-off point on the North Downs Way which runs through the village as it crosses the Darent Valley, intersecting the Darent Valley Path.

=== Pilgrims' Way ===
Passing through Otford is the Pilgrims' Way, the historic route supposed to have been taken by pilgrims from Winchester in Hampshire to the shrine of Saint Thomas Becket at Canterbury Cathedral.

== Amenities ==
=== Schools ===
The village includes a state primary school, Otford Primary School, and two independents (properly called public schools in the UK), St Michael's Prep School and Russell House School.

=== Nursery schools ===
There are three nursery schools in Otford: Otford Nursery, Gatehouse Nursery and Longacre.

=== Sports ===
Otford has a public recreation field of approximately 12 acres, marked for football with floodlighting, and cricket. There are also tennis courts available through Otford Tennis Club.

=== Village hall ===
Otford Village Memorial Hall is available for hire, and also regularly hosts local clubs ranging from dance to theatre, and bridge to embroidery.

=== Otford Heritage Centre ===
Built in 1999, in the old school house, this centre includes a scale model of the Archbishop's Palace, and details of local geology, archaeology and history, plus artefacts from Roman to recent times, including historical photos, a Percy Pilcher model, and a working model of a Kentish oast house. Percy Pilcher is often quoted as being the first man to fly a glider in the British Isles, on 12 September 1895 (although there are good records showing that Eilmer of Malmsbury actually accomplished this in the 11th century). He is considered to have invented the bi-plane form of stacked wings. He was killed in a gliding accident before he could go on to be the first man to fly a powered aircraft.

=== Shopping, eating and drinking ===
Otford now has just two pubs, a restaurant and two cafes, as the conversion of retail premises into accommodation continues. It also has a couple of antique shops, a milliner, flower shop, a tennis specialist, local Post Office, a convenience store and a popular builder's merchant. There is parking for free for a limited period in the village car-park.

=== Leisure ===
The village has allotments for hire, on land very close to the centre, which are managed by the Parish Council. Otford is covered by OS Landranger Map 188 (Maidstone and Royal Tunbridge Wells) at 1:50,000 and by OS Explorer 147 (Sevenoaks and Tonbridge) at 1:25,000.

Otford has its own television relay, situated at 51.321,0.199 or 51°19'16"N 0°11'55"E in the Otford Hills, serving Otford, Shoreham, and parts of Dunton Green and Kemsing. The television service is BBC London region, originating from the Crystal Palace transmitter. In some parts of Otford, the Crystal Palace transmitter can be received directly, and offers a richer set of multiplexes than the local relay. The BBC South East service is also available from the Bluebell Hill transmitter in some parts of Otford, which offers a similarly rich set of multiplexes but includes ITV Meridian not ITV London, and BBC Radio Kent rather than BBC London. Specialist installations can receive both sets at the same premises, as the multiplex channels are largely not overlapping, although two antennae are required for this.

The library is situated on the High Street, and is run by KCC. It is open Tuesdays and Fridays all day, Mondays, Thursdays and Saturdays mornings only, and is closed on Wednesday and Sunday. It is integrated into the Kent library systems, with common library cards. Printing, scanning and copying services are available, as well as computers for web access, several social clubs and a book club. There is limited parking.

== Conservation areas ==
Otford Conservation Area covers some 16 hectares and contains about forty listed buildings and part of the scheduled monument of the Archbishop's Palace. It was designated in 1969 and extended in 1976, 1990 and 2006.

The village features a community farm dedicated to therapeutic beekeeping and native bee conservation.

== See also ==
- List of places of worship in Sevenoaks (district)
- Listed buildings in Otford
