= Listed buildings in Otford =

Civil Parish in Kent, England

Otford is a village and civil parish in the Sevenoaks District of Kent, England. It contains one grade I, six grade II* and 30 grade II listed buildings that are recorded in the National Heritage List for England.

This list is based on the information retrieved online from Historic England.

== Key ==
Grade	Criteria
I	Buildings that are of exceptional interest
II*	Particularly important buildings of more than special interest
II	Buildings that are of special interest

== Listing ==
Name	Grade	Location	Type	Completed (Note: The date given is the date used by Historic England as significant for the initial building or that of an important part in the structure's description.)	Date designated	Grid ref. (Note: The grid reference is based on the British national grid reference system, sometimes known as OSGB36, used by the Ordnance Survey.) Geo-coordinates	Notes	Entry number (Note: The "List Entry Number" is a unique number assigned to each listed building and scheduled monument by Historic England.)	Image	Wikidata
Otford War Memorial	II	TN14 5PD			19 July 2018	TQ5280459323; 51°18′45″N 0°11′28″E		1451860	Otford War Memorial More images	Q66479197
Castle House	II	Bubblestone Road			10 September 1954	TQ5294859163; 51°18′40″N 0°11′35″E		1259004	Upload Photo	Q26550173
Remains of Walls of Archbishop's Palace in Back Gardens of Nos 5-11 (odd)	II	Bubblestone Road			16 January 1975	TQ5284659117; 51°18′38″N 0°11′30″E		1259003	Upload Photo	Q26550172
Remains of Walls of Archbishop's Palace in Front Gardens of Nos 5-11 (odd)	II	Bubblestone Road			16 January 1975	TQ5285059074; 51°18′37″N 0°11′30″E		1273169	Upload Photo	Q26562944
4, High Street	II	4, High Street			16 January 1975	TQ5278259379; 51°18′47″N 0°11′27″E		1259009	Upload Photo	Q26550178
48 and 50, High Street	II	48 and 50, High Street			30 October 1972	TQ5254359379; 51°18′47″N 0°11′14″E		1273173	Upload Photo	Q26562947
59 and 61, High Street	II	59 and 61, High Street			16 January 1975	TQ5243259342; 51°18′46″N 0°11′09″E		1259015	Upload Photo	Q26550184
Boddington	II	1, High Street			16 January 1975	TQ5269959359; 51°18′46″N 0°11′22″E		1259067	Upload Photo	Q26550228
Bridge Cottage East Bridge Cottage West	II	High Street			16 January 1975	TQ5234459335; 51°18′46″N 0°11′04″E		1273174	Upload Photo	Q26562948
Broughton Manor	II*	High Street			10 September 1954	TQ5228559270; 51°18′44″N 0°11′01″E		1259018	Upload Photo	Q17545772
Forecourt Wall to Bridge Cottages	II	High Street			16 January 1975	TQ5235459329; 51°18′46″N 0°11′05″E		1259011	Upload Photo	Q26550180
Forge House Tea Rooms	II	30-34, High Street			15 November 1973	TQ5266959381; 51°18′47″N 0°11′21″E		1273149	Upload Photo	Q26562928
Front Garden Wall of the Grange	II	High Street			16 January 1975	TQ5239259340; 51°18′46″N 0°11′07″E		1259070	Upload Photo	Q26550231
Gate Piers and Gates to No 23 (the Old Parsonage)	II	High Street			16 January 1975	TQ5255359362; 51°18′47″N 0°11′15″E		1259014	Upload Photo	Q26550183
Pickmoss Including Former No 67 (pickmoss Cottage)	II*	69, High Street			10 September 1954	TQ5241159338; 51°18′46″N 0°11′08″E		1259016	Upload Photo	Q17545766
The Bull Inn	II	High Street			10 September 1954	TQ5263359359; 51°18′46″N 0°11′19″E		1259013	The Bull Inn More images	Q26550182
The Grange	II	High Street			16 January 1975	TQ5241359311; 51°18′45″N 0°11′08″E		1259017	Upload Photo	Q26550185
The Horns Public House	II	High Street			16 January 1975	TQ5241359362; 51°18′47″N 0°11′08″E		1259010	The Horns Public House More images	Q26550179
The Mill House	II	High Street			16 January 1975	TQ5235459377; 51°18′47″N 0°11′05″E		1259060	Upload Photo	Q26550221
The Old Parsonage	II	23, High Street			10 September 1954	TQ5256059330; 51°18′45″N 0°11′15″E		1259068	Upload Photo	Q26550229
Wall and Gates to North of Broughton Manor	II*	High Street			16 January 1975	TQ5231259305; 51°18′45″N 0°11′02″E		1259019	Upload Photo	Q17545778
Wall to East of Boddington Bounding Garden of Mount View the Green	II	High Street			16 January 1975	TQ5271459360; 51°18′46″N 0°11′23″E		1259012	Upload Photo	Q26550181
Bubblestone Farmhouse	II	The Green			31 December 1970	TQ5274859274; 51°18′43″N 0°11′25″E		1259007	Upload Photo	Q26550176
Castle Cottages and Store Building at East End	II*	1-3, The Green			10 September 1954	TQ5283059199; 51°18′41″N 0°11′29″E		1273146	Upload Photo	Q17545879
Chantry Cottage	II	The Green			16 January 1975	TQ5281259274; 51°18′43″N 0°11′28″E		1259006	Upload Photo	Q26550175
Church of St Bartholomew	I	The Green			10 September 1954	TQ5285159308; 51°18′44″N 0°11′30″E		1273170	Church of St Bartholomew More images	Q17529909
Colet's Well	II	The Green			10 September 1954	TQ5282859353; 51°18′46″N 0°11′29″E		1259005	Upload Photo	Q26550174
Holmesdale House Holmesdale Villa	II*	The Green			10 September 1954	TQ5277059258; 51°18′43″N 0°11′26″E		1259052	Upload Photo	Q17545783
K6 Telephone Kiosk	II	The Green			12 January 1988	TQ5274759335; 51°18′45″N 0°11′25″E		1244200	Upload Photo	Q26536832
Mount View	II	The Green			16 January 1975	TQ5273359344; 51°18′46″N 0°11′24″E		1259008	Upload Photo	Q26550177
Otford Pond	II	The Green			16 January 1975	TQ5277459344; 51°18′46″N 0°11′26″E		1259054	Upload Photo	Q26550215
The Chantry House	II*	The Green			16 January 1975	TQ5282259295; 51°18′44″N 0°11′29″E		1273144	Upload Photo	Q17545875
Wall Bounding Front Garden of Police House	II	The Green			16 January 1975	TQ5274659331; 51°18′45″N 0°11′25″E		1273172	Upload Photo	Q26562946
Wall Surrounding Garden of Colet's Well	II	The Green			16 January 1975	TQ5283259332; 51°18′45″N 0°11′29″E		1273143	Upload Photo	Q26562925
Wall to North of Bubblestone Farmhouse	II	The Green			16 January 1975	TQ5274159315; 51°18′45″N 0°11′25″E		1259053	Upload Photo	Q26550214
Walls to South and East of Garden of Holmesdale Villa	II	The Green			16 January 1975	TQ5280159218; 51°18′42″N 0°11′28″E		1273171	Upload Photo	Q26562945
5 and 6, Twitton Lane	II	5 and 6, Twitton Lane			16 January 1975	TQ5114059417; 51°18′50″N 0°10′02″E		1243730	Upload Photo	Q26536396

== See also ==
- Grade I listed buildings in Kent
- Grade II* listed buildings in Kent

== Sources ==
- Newman, John (2012) [1969], Kent: West and the Weald, The Buildings of England, New Haven and London: Yale University Press, ISBN 978-0-300-18509-6
