= Hundred of Blackheath, Kent =

Historical Hundred of Kent, England

Blackheath
- Map of the Hundred of Blackheath, published in 1797
- Area
  - 1831: 12,650 acres (51 km^{2})
  - 1887: 17,316 acres (70 km^{2})
- Population
  - 1851: 121,753
  - 1887: 234,987
- History
  - Created: in antiquity
  - Abolished: 1889
  - Succeeded by: various, see text
- Status: hundred
  - HQ: Blackheath

Blackheath was an ancient hundred in the north west of the county of Kent in England. It had become obsolete by the beginning of the 20th century in the wake of ongoing reforms to local government. The name "Blackheath" now refers to a district of SE London. In 2022, the area of the old hundred lies mainly within the Royal Borough of Greenwich.

== History ==
The name is first recorded as Blachehedfeld in 1166, meaning dark-coloured heathland. The open space at Blackheath was the site of hundred meetings. In the Domesday Book of 1086 it is recorded as the hundred of Grenviz (Greenwich), which was part of the lathe of Sutton at Hone. The hundred contained the parishes of Charlton, Chislehurst, St Paul and St Nicholas Deptford, Eltham, Greenwich, Kidbrooke, Lee, Lewisham, Woolwich and Mottingham.

The northern boundary with the Becontree hundred of Essex was mainly the River Thames; however there was also a short land boundary as the parish of Woolwich included two small exclaves north of the river, totalling 402 acres (1.6 km^{2}). Also to the north along the river was a short boundary with the Isle of Dogs and the Tower division of the Ossulstone hundred of Middlesex. In the west it bordered the Brixton hundred of Surrey. Within Kent, it was bounded by the hundreds of Bromley and Beckenham to the south, Ruxley to the south east and Lesnes to the east.

In 1831, the hundred occupied 12,650 acres (51 km^{2}). The parishes of St Paul and St Nicholas, Deptford and the parish of Greenwich were included in the Metropolitan Police District by the Metropolitan Police Act 1829, and in 1840 the rest of the hundred was included by the Metropolitan Police Act 1839.

The population is recorded as 121,753 in 1851 and 187,696 in 1861. In 1887 the hundred is recorded as occupying an area of 17,316 acres (70 km^{2}), with a population of 234,987.

== Replacement ==
The hundreds of England declined in administrative significance because of the rise of various ad hoc boards which took over administrative functions. In 1855, most of the hundred (except Chislehurst and Mottingham) was included in the area of the Metropolitan Board of Works by the Metropolis Management Act 1855. The hundred fell into desuetude when the area (except Chislehurst and Mottingham) became part of the County of London in 1889. The entire area has formed part of Greater London since 1965.

In 1894 and 1900 all local government functions were effectively replaced by a system of districts, which were consolidated over time and finally replaced in 1965 by the London boroughs which are still in use today.

Parish	District	London borough
Charlton	Metropolitan Borough of Greenwich	Greenwich
Chislehurst	Bromley Rural District	Bromley
Deptford St Nicholas	Metropolitan Borough of Greenwich	Greenwich
Deptford St Paul	Metropolitan Borough of Deptford	Lewisham
Eltham	Metropolitan Borough of Woolwich	Greenwich
Greenwich	Metropolitan Borough of Greenwich	Greenwich
Kidbrooke	Metropolitan Borough of Greenwich	Greenwich
Lee	Metropolitan Borough of Lewisham	Lewisham
Lewisham	Metropolitan Borough of Lewisham	Lewisham
Mottingham	Bromley Rural District	Bromley
Woolwich	Metropolitan Borough of Woolwich	Greenwich
