= Shepway =

Shepway may refer to the following places and institutions in Kent, England:

- Shepway, Maidstone, a suburb of Maidstone
- The former name for Folkestone and Hythe District
- The name of a lathe, a historical subdivision of Kent
- The court of Shepway, a historical local royal court of justice associated with the Cinque Ports

== See also ==
- Isle of Sheppey
