= Sevenoaks Rural District =

Former local government area in the UK

Sevenoaks Rural District was a rural district in the county of Kent, England, from 1894 to 1974. It did not include Sevenoaks Urban District, which covered the town of Sevenoaks. It was created in 1894 from the majority of the area of Somerden Hundred, and parts of the Hundreds of Codsheath, Brasted, and Westerham and Edinbridge.

It included the following civil parishes:

- Brasted
- Chevening
- Chiddingstone
- Cowden
- Dunton Green (1909–1974; created from part of Otford parish)
- Edenbridge
- Halstead
- Hever
- Kemsing
- Knockholt (1969–1974; gained from London Borough of Bromley in Greater London)
- Leigh
- Otford
- Penshurst
- Riverhead
- Seal
- Sevenoaks Weald
- Shoreham
- Sundridge
- Westerham

The rural district was abolished in 1974 and its former area is now part of the Sevenoaks district.
