= 2023 Sevenoaks District Council election =

2023 UK local government election

- 4 May 2023

Party	Conservative	Liberal Democrats	Green
Party	Independent	Labour
- Winner of each seat at the 2023 Sevenoaks District Council election
Leader before election
Peter Fleming
Conservative
Leader after election
Julia Thornton
Conservative

The 2023 Sevenoaks District Council election took place on 4 May 2023 to elect members of Sevenoaks District Council in Kent, England. This was on the same day as other local elections across England.

== Summary ==
The Conservatives lost 13 seats compared to the previous election in 2019, but nevertheless retained a majority of the seats on the council. One of those Conservatives who lost their seat was the leader of the council, Peter Fleming, who had been leader since 2005. Julia Thornton was chosen as new leader of the Conservative group and was formally appointed as leader of the council at the subsequent annual council meeting on 23 May 2023.

The Green Party gained their first seats on the council in, winning all three seats in Ash/New Ash Green plus one in Eynsford.

=== Election result ===
The overall results were:

2023 Sevenoaks District Council election
Party	Candidates	Seats	Gains	Losses	Net gain/loss	Seats %	Votes %	Votes	+/−
Conservative	54	33	2	14	▼13	61.1	51.1	31,747	–6.9
Liberal Democrats	29	14	10	0	▲11	25.9	28.1	17,449	+13.2
Green	20	4	4	0	▲4	7.4	10.7	6,629	+4.2
Independent	10	3	0	1	▼1	5.6	5.3	3,273	–5.2
Labour	11	0	0	1	▼1	0.0	4.7	2,923	–5.0
Reform	1	0	0	0	Steady	0.0	0.1	83	N/A
SDP	1	0	0	0	Steady	0.0	0.1	78	N/A

== Ward results ==
The Statement of Persons Nominated, which details the candidates standing in each ward, was released by Sevenoaks District Council following the close of nominations on 4 April 2023. The results in each ward were as follows:

=== Ash and New Ash Green ===
Ash and New Ash Green (3 seats)
Party	Candidate	Votes	%	±%
Green	Laura Manston	1,066	23	+6
Green	Shani Manamperi	1,018	22	N/A
Green	Mark Lindop	918	20	N/A
Conservative	Claire Nelson*	589	13	−14
Conservative	George Pender*	537	12	−12
Conservative	Andrew Juxon	460	10	−9
Majority				
Turnout		1,633	36	
Rejected ballots		8	0.5	
Registered electors		4,519		
Green gain from Conservative		Swing		
Green gain from Conservative		Swing		
Green gain from Conservative		Swing		

=== Brasted, Chevening and Sundridge ===
Brasted, Chevening and Sundridge (3 seats)
Party	Candidate	Votes	%	±%
Conservative	Nigel Williams*	918	17	−6
Liberal Democrats	Sandra Robinson	897	17	N/A
Liberal Democrats	Michelle Alger	895	17	N/A
Liberal Democrats	Jennifer McCloskey	884	17	N/A
Conservative	James London*	877	16	−5
Conservative	Keith Bonin*	845	16	−5
Majority				
Turnout		1,872	39	
Rejected ballots		13	0.7	
Registered electors		4,851		
Conservative hold		Swing		
Liberal Democrats gain from Conservative		Swing		
Liberal Democrats gain from Conservative		Swing		

=== Cowden and Hever ===
Cowden and Hever
Party	Candidate	Votes	%	±%
Conservative	James Barnett	337	54	N/A
Liberal Democrats	Kenton Ward	164	26	N/A
Green	Juliet Townsend	126	20	N/A
Majority				
Turnout		632	38	
Rejected ballots		5	0.8	
Registered electors		1,642		
Conservative hold		Swing		

=== Crockenhill and Well Hill ===
Crockenhill and Well Hill
Party	Candidate	Votes	%	±%
Independent	Rachel Waterton*	500	87	N/A
Conservative	Luke Taylor	77	13	−11
Majority				
Turnout		580	37	
Rejected ballots		3	0.5	
Registered electors		1,567		
Independent hold		Swing		

=== Dunton Green and Riverhead ===
Dunton Green and Riverhead (2 seats)
Party	Candidate	Votes	%	±%
Conservative	Kim Bayley*	639	24	N/A
Conservative	Graham Clark	588	22	N/A
Liberal Democrats	Libby Ancrum	464	17	N/A
Liberal Democrats	Richard Gustard	354	13	N/A
Independent	Freda England	323	12	N/A
Labour	Carl Marten	176	7	N/A
Labour	Gavin Owen	153	6	N/A
Majority				
Turnout		1,392	33	
Rejected ballots		0	0.0	
Registered electors		4,203		
Conservative hold		Swing		
Conservative hold		Swing		

=== Edenbridge North and East ===
Edenbridge North and East (2 seats)
Party	Candidate	Votes	%	±%
Conservative	Angela Baker	690	38	+7
Liberal Democrats	James Morgan	566	31	+12
Conservative	Stuart McGregor*	556	31	+6
Majority				
Turnout		1,177	28	
Rejected ballots		15	1.3	
Registered electors		4,275		
Conservative hold		Swing		
Liberal Democrats gain from Conservative		Swing		

=== Edenbridge South and West ===
Edenbridge South and West (2 seats)
Party	Candidate	Votes	%	±%
Conservative	Alan Layland*	495	29	+6
Conservative	Margot McArthur*	415	24	+1
Liberal Democrats	Caroline Mace	396	23	+1
Liberal Democrats	Jon Aldridge	393	23	+12
Majority				
Turnout		908	28	
Rejected ballots		9	1.0	
Registered electors		3,187		
Conservative hold		Swing		
Conservative hold		Swing		

=== Eynsford ===
Eynsford
Party	Candidate	Votes	%	±%
Green	Michael Barker	378	64	+16
Conservative	Alan Cheeseman*	215	36	−16
Majority				
Turnout		597	41	
Rejected ballots		4	0.7	
Registered electors		1,465		
Green gain from Conservative		Swing		

=== Farningham, Horton Kirby and South Darenth ===
Farningham, Horton Kirby and South Darenth (2 seats)
Party	Candidate	Votes	%	±%
Conservative	Alan White	550	31	±0.0
Conservative	Laurence Ball	541	31	±0.0
Liberal Democrats	Tristan Ward	357	20	−1
Green	Toby Croker	309	18	N/A
Majority				
Turnout		983	26	
Rejected ballots		7	0.7	
Registered electors		3,745		
Conservative hold		Swing		
Conservative hold		Swing		

=== Fawkham and West Kingsdown ===
Fawkham and West Kingsdown (3 seats)
Party	Candidate	Votes	%	±%
Conservative	Lynda Harrison*	820	27	+3
Conservative	Emily Bulford*	758	25	+4
Conservative	Sean Malone	532	17	−1
Independent	Maxine Fothergill*	416	14	−9
Green	Sandie Peters	284	9	−5
Green	Chris Russell	249	8	N/A
Majority				
Turnout		1,225	25	
Rejected ballots		8	0.7	
Registered electors		4,871		
Conservative hold		Swing		
Conservative gain from Independent		Swing		
Conservative hold		Swing		

=== Halstead, Knockholt and Badgers Mount ===
Halstead, Knockholt and Badgers Mount (2 seats)
Party	Candidate	Votes	%	±%
Conservative	Gary Williamson*	620	34	−7
Conservative	John Grint*	604	33	−4
Liberal Democrats	Laura Covill	336	18	N/A
Liberal Democrats	John Roberts	286	15	N/A
Majority				
Turnout		983	36	
Rejected ballots		12	1.2	
Registered electors		2,762		
Conservative hold		Swing		
Conservative hold		Swing		

=== Hartley and Hodsoll Street ===
Hartley and Hodsoll Street (3 seats)
Party	Candidate	Votes	%	±%
Conservative	Larry Abraham*	1,066	25	−3
Conservative	Penny Cole*	1,055	25	−2
Conservative	Perry Cole*	1,041	24	±0.0
Green	Mark Chang	381	9	−2
Green	Mike Young	381	9	±0.0
Green	Richard Cobbold	374	9	N/A
Majority				
Turnout		1,530	32	
Rejected ballots		8	0.5	
Registered electors		4,742		
Conservative hold		Swing		
Conservative hold		Swing		
Conservative hold		Swing		

=== Hextable ===
Hextable (2 seats)
Party	Candidate	Votes	%	±%
Independent	Darren Kitchener*	631	37	N/A
Independent	Chrissy Hudson*	444	26	N/A
Independent	Henry Bull	300	18	N/A
Conservative	Jaami al-Choudhury	154	9	+3
Conservative	Anwara Ali	154	9	+3
Majority				
Turnout		878	27	
Rejected ballots		5	0.6	
Registered electors		3,264		
Independent hold		Swing		
Independent hold		Swing		

=== Kemsing ===
Kemsing (2 seats)
Party	Candidate	Votes	%	±%
Conservative	Simon Reay*	646	30	−11
Conservative	Christopher Haslam	567	27	−12
Green	Ian Head	471	22	N/A
Liberal Democrats	Gareth Willis	437	21	N/A
Majority				
Turnout		1,154	35	
Rejected ballots		1	0.1	
Registered electors		3,269		
Conservative hold		Swing		
Conservative hold		Swing		

=== Leigh and Chiddingstone Causeway ===
Leigh and Chiddingstone Causeway
Party	Candidate	Votes	%	±%
Liberal Democrats	Malcolm Silander	410	59	N/A
Conservative	Michael Gemmell Smith	290	41	N/A
Majority				
Turnout		702	38	
Rejected ballots		2	0.3	
Registered electors		1,854		
Liberal Democrats gain from Conservative		Swing		

=== Otford and Shoreham ===
Otford and Shoreham (2 seats)
Party	Candidate	Votes	%	±%
Conservative	John Edwards-Winser*	759	30	−2
Conservative	Irene Roy*	639	25	−4
Liberal Democrats	Benedict Bannister	427	17	−1
Liberal Democrats	Iain Porter	402	16	+6
Green	Maya Forth	294	12	N/A
Majority				
Turnout		1,397	38	
Rejected ballots		13	0.9	
Registered electors		3,647		
Conservative hold		Swing		
Conservative hold		Swing		

=== Penshurst, Fordcombe and Chiddingstone ===
Penshurst, Fordcombe and Chiddingstone
Party	Candidate	Votes	%	±%
Liberal Democrats	Richard Streatfeild*	433	54	N/A
Conservative	Ian Butcher	376	46	N/A
Majority		57	7.0	N/A
Turnout		813	42	
Rejected ballots		4	0.5	
Registered electors		1,931		
Liberal Democrats hold		Swing	N/A	

=== Seal and Weald ===
Seal and Weald (2 seats)
Party	Candidate	Votes	%	±%
Conservative	Julia Thornton*	567	28	−11
Conservative	Roddy Hogarth*	564	28	−8
Liberal Democrats	Andrew Michaelides	534	26	+1
Green	Gabriel Preutu	380	19	N/A
Majority				
Turnout		1,114	34	
Rejected ballots		5	0.4	
Registered electors		3,240		
Conservative hold		Swing		
Conservative hold		Swing		

=== Sevenoaks Eastern ===
Sevenoaks Eastern (2 seats)
Party	Candidate	Votes	%	±%
Liberal Democrats	Tony Clayton*	911	41	+8
Liberal Democrats	Elizabeth Purves*	871	39	+6
Conservative	Paul Julius	235	11	−1
Conservative	Barbara Reade	212	10	−2
Majority				
Turnout		1,157	39	
Rejected ballots		4	0.3	
Registered electors		2,964		
Liberal Democrats hold		Swing		
Liberal Democrats hold		Swing		

=== Sevenoaks Kippington ===
Sevenoaks Kippington (2 seats)
Party	Candidate	Votes	%	±%
Liberal Democrats	Chloe Gustard	811	27	+1
Liberal Democrats	Nicholas Varley	781	26	N/A
Conservative	Avril Hunter*	730	24	−13
Conservative	James Turner	652	21	−16
SDP	Ian Grattidge	78	3	N/A
Majority				
Turnout		1,581	43	
Rejected ballots		11	0.7	
Registered electors		3,643		
Liberal Democrats gain from Conservative		Swing		
Liberal Democrats gain from Conservative		Swing		

=== Sevenoaks Northern ===
Sevenoaks Northern (2 seats)
Party	Candidate	Votes	%	±%
Liberal Democrats	Claire Shea	750	34	+5
Liberal Democrats	Alan Leaman	688	32	+11
Conservative	Irene Collins*	389	18	−3
Conservative	Kassia Estrada-Castillon	269	12	−9
Reform	Daniel Kersten	83	4	N/A
Majority				
Turnout		1,160	36	
Rejected ballots		14	1.2	
Registered electors		3,237		
Liberal Democrats hold		Swing		
Liberal Democrats gain from Conservative		Swing		

=== Sevenoaks Town and St. John's ===
Sevenoaks Town and St. John's (3 seats)
Party	Candidate	Votes	%	±%
Liberal Democrats	Susan Camp	1,165	19	+7
Liberal Democrats	Victoria Granville	1,156	19	+9
Liberal Democrats	David Skinner	1,103	18	+9
Conservative	Peter Fleming*	936	15	−2
Conservative	Caroline Platt	863	14	−2
Conservative	Simon Raikes*	843	14	−2
Majority				
Turnout		2,127	43	
Rejected ballots		16	0.8	
Registered electors		4,976		
Liberal Democrats gain from Conservative		Swing		
Liberal Democrats gain from Conservative		Swing		
Liberal Democrats gain from Conservative		Swing		

=== Swanley Christchurch and Swanley Village ===
Swanley Christchurch and Swanley Village (3 seats)
Party	Candidate	Votes	%	±%
Conservative	Clare Barnes*	858	24	+2
Conservative	Michael Horwood	808	22	+2
Conservative	Nina Scott	655	18	+3
Labour	David Griffiths	369	10	+1
Labour	Melvyn George	338	9	+1
Labour	Ian Rashbrook	334	9	+2
Independent	Tony Searles	271	7	−4
Majority				
Turnout		1,334	29	
Rejected ballots		12	0.9	
Registered electors		4,650		
Conservative hold		Swing		
Conservative hold		Swing		
Conservative hold		Swing		

=== Swanley St. Mary's ===
Swanley St. Mary's (2 seats)
Party	Candidate	Votes	%	±%
Conservative	Lesley Dyball*	417	34	+14
Conservative	Cathy Morgan	354	29	+11
Labour	Jackie Griffiths*	229	19	±0.0
Labour	Jordan Selvey	217	18	+1
Majority				
Turnout		645	20	
Rejected ballots		2	0.3	
Registered electors		3,276		
Conservative hold		Swing		
Conservative gain from Labour		Swing		

=== Swanley White Oak ===
Swanley White Oak (3 seats)
Party	Candidate	Votes	%	±%
Conservative	Glynnis Darrington*	630	21	+3
Conservative	Paul Darrington*	609	20	+3
Conservative	Jasmine Ferrari	591	19	+3
Labour	Angela George	298	10	−1
Labour	Mark Fittock	289	9	−2
Labour	Theo Michael	244	8	−2
Independent	Sarah Andrews*	164	5	±0.0
Independent	Jen Tuckfield	139	5	+1
Independent	Albert Venter	85	3	−1
Majority				
Turnout		1,093	23	
Rejected ballots		11	1.0	
Registered electors		4,773		
Conservative hold		Swing		
Conservative hold		Swing		
Conservative hold		Swing		

=== Westerham and Crockham Hill ===
Westerham and Crockham Hill (2 seats)
Party	Candidate	Votes	%	±%
Conservative	Kevin Maskell*	586	29	−9
Conservative	Diana Esler*	569	28	−9
Liberal Democrats	Tom Mackay	357	18	N/A
Labour	Peter Storey	276	14	−11
Liberal Democrats	Richard Baxter	221	11	N/A
Majority				
Turnout		1,102	31	
Rejected ballots		10	0.9	
Registered electors		3,508		
Conservative hold		Swing		
Conservative hold		Swing		

== Changes 2023–2027 ==
- On 15 May 2025, seven Conservative councillors resigned the party whip after a dispute over cabinet selections by council leader Roddy Hogarth; two more followed within days. The nine — Julia Thornton, Margot McArthur, Diana Esler, Alan Layland, Angela Baker, Chris Haslam, Simon Reay, John Grint and Kim Bayley — formed a new group, the West Kent Independents, led by Thornton, costing the Conservatives their majority and leaving the council under no overall control.
- Roddy Hogarth resigned as leader of the council on 18 November 2025 after months of pressure culminating in a no-confidence vote brought by the West Kent Independents; Conservative councillor Kevin Maskell was elected as his successor the same day.
- In December 2025, James Barnett, the Conservative councillor for Cowden and Hever, defected to Reform UK, becoming the party's first councillor on Sevenoaks District Council and the tenth Conservative defection of the year; he cited instability within the Conservative group following the removal of Roddy Hogarth as leader.
- In January 2026, Laurence Ball, the Conservative councillor for Farningham, Horton Kirby and South Darenth, joined Reform UK, becoming the party's second councillor on the council.
- By March 2026, independent councillors Christine Hudson (Hextable) and Rachel Waterton (Crockenhill and Well Hill) had formed the North Sevenoaks District Independent Group.
- In June 2026, Kim Bayley, John Grint and Simon Reay returned to the Conservatives. A council report presented on 14 July recorded six members of the West Kent Independent Group.

=== By-elections ===
==== Hextable ====
The by-election was triggered by the death of independent councillor Darren Kitchener, chairman of Hextable Parish Council, from a congenital heart condition.

Hextable by-election, 5 March 2026
Party	Candidate	Votes	%	±%
Conservative	Lee Allen	600	38.9	▲21.3
Reform	Daniel Kersten	406	26.3	N/A
Liberal Democrats	Ashley Wassall	367	23.8	N/A
Independent	Jackie Griffiths	108	7	N/A
Green	Oliver Young	62	4	N/A
Majority		194	12.6	▲4
Turnout		1,547	47.1	▲20
Registered electors		3,281		
Conservative gain from Independent		Swing		

==== Halstead, Knockholt and Badgers Mount ====
The by-election was triggered by the death of Conservative councillor Gary Williamson, who had served on the council for more than 25 years.

Halstead, Knockholt and Badgers Mount by-election, 26 March 2026
Party	Candidate	Votes	%	±%
Conservative	Tony Marshall	561	44	N/A
Reform	George Pender	378	30	N/A
Liberal Democrats	Stephen Maines	266	21	N/A
Green	Robert Royston	65	5	N/A
Majority		183	14	N/A
Turnout		1,273	45	
Rejected ballots		3	0.2	
Registered electors		2,829		
Conservative hold		Swing		
