= Sheppey =

Sheppey may refer to:

- Isle of Sheppey, on the north Kent coast
  - Municipal Borough of Queenborough-in-Sheppey
  - Sittingbourne and Sheppey (UK Parliament constituency)
  - Sheppey Crossing
  - Sheppey Light Railway
  - A.F.C. Sheppey
- River Sheppey, in Somerset
- Sheppey Corner, in Gloucestershire
- John Sheppey (1300–1360), English administrator and bishop
- Sheppey (play), a 1933 play by William Somerset Maugham
- Sheppey, a humorous unit of measure

== See also ==
- Shepway (disambiguation)
