= Lessness Heath =

District in London, England

Coordinates: 51.4857°N 0.15177°E

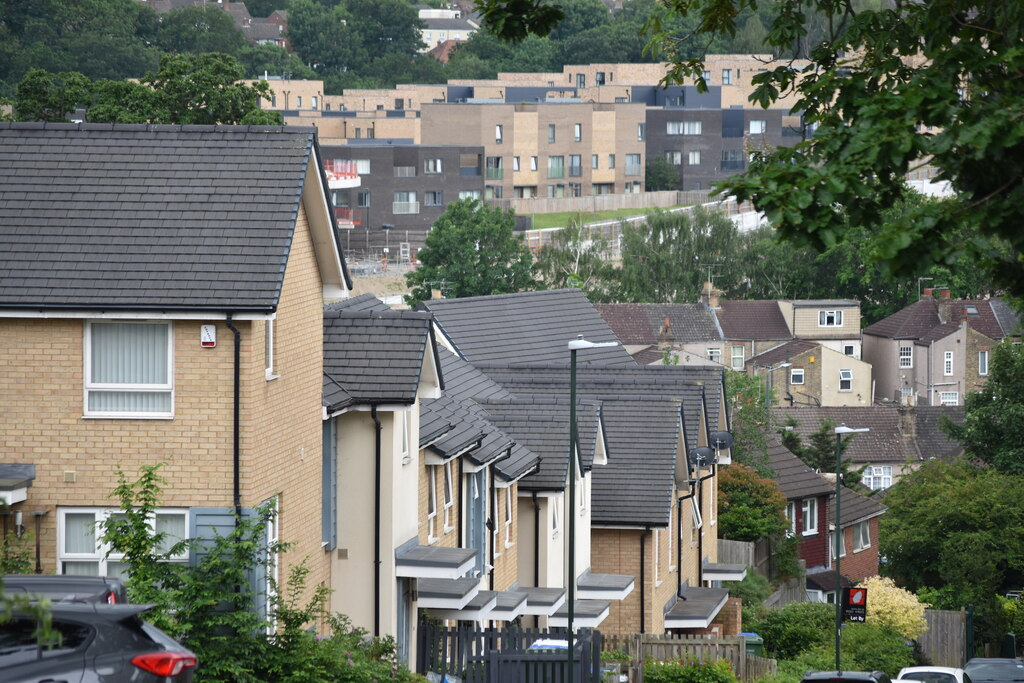

- Location within Greater London
- OS grid reference: TQ495785
- London borough: Bexley
- Ceremonial county: Greater London
- Region: London
- Country: England
- Sovereign state: United Kingdom
- Post town: BELVEDERE
- Postcode district: DA17
- Dialling code: 020
- Police: Metropolitan
- Fire: London
- Ambulance: London
- UK Parliament: Erith and Thamesmead
- London Assembly: Bexley and Bromley

Lessness Heath is a district in the London Borough of Bexley, in the area of Belvedere.

== History and name ==
Lessness was recorded in the Domesday Book in 1086, as the largest settlement in the Hundred of Litlelee in Kent and contained 68 households at that time.

The name of Lessness Heath has changed over the centuries. It was recorded as Leosne in the mid 11th century, Lesneis and Loisnes in 1086 in the Domesday Book, Hlosness in the late 11th century and Lesnes in 1194. At around 1762, Emanuel Bowen recorded the place as Leesing on one of his maps, then in 1805 an Ordnance Survey map recorded it as Lesness Heath. It has been suggested the name may be from an Old English word hlēosne, the plural of hlēosn meaning 'Burial mound' or 'shelter', later possibly adding the word næss meaning 'headland' to the end.

Lessness Heath gave its name to the ancient hundred, the Hundred of Lessness, and was the meeting place for residents of the hundred to discuss matters. In 1178, the Abbey of St Mary and St Thomas the Martyr at Lesnes, Lesnes Abbey, was founded near Lessness Heath and named after it.

== Nearest places ==
- Abbey Wood
- Belvedere
- Bexleyheath
- West Heath

== See also ==
- Lesnes Abbey
- Lesnes Abbey Woods
