= Lathe of St. Augustine =

Historic division of Kent, England

St Augustine
- Former subdivision of England
- History
  - Origin: Merger of Borough Lathe and Eastry Lathe
  - Created: 13th century
  - Abolished: 1894 (obsolescent)
  - Succeeded by: diverse authorities
- Status: obsolete
- Government: Lathe
- Subdivisions
  - Type: Hundreds

The Lathe of St Augustine is an historic division of the county of Kent, England, encompassing the present-day Districts of Canterbury, Dover and Thanet. The Lathes of Kent were ancient administration divisions originating, probably, in the 6th century, during the Jutish colonisation of the county.

Named for Saint Augustine of Canterbury, St Augustine was not one of the original lathes and did not exist at the time of the Domesday Book. The lathe of St Augustine was in existence by 1295, however, having been formed by the merger of the lathes of Borough and Eastry. These lathes were spelled Borowart and Estrei in the Domesday Book.

The lathe was bordered on the west by the Lathe of Scray and on the south by the Lathe of Shepway. The lathe of St Augustine consisted of the following Hundreds:

- Whitstaple (the former spelling of Whitstable)
- Westgate
- Blengate
- Preston
- Wingham
- Downhamford
- Kinghamford
- Beusborough (Bewsbury)
- Corniloe
- Eastry
- Ringslow

Within the bounds of the lathe were included the Corporations of Deal, Sandwich, Dover, and Fordwich. It had formerly within its bounds the city of Canterbury, which has been separated from it and made a county of itself in 1461, by the name of the County of the City of Canterbury.

The Lathe was an important administrative, judicial and taxation unit for 600 years after the Domesday Book. The functions of Lathe and hundreds were somewhat similar, with a Lathe covering a much wider area. Although not abolished, it has no administrative functions today. The Sheriff toured the county twice yearly attending on the lathes. The lathe was responsible for raising of aids and subsidies for the Militia. However the Lathe court became anomalous as it fell between the hundredal courts below and the Justices of the county (in petty and quarter sessions) above

The Lathe of St Augustine had an area of 166,760 acres (260 sq. miles).
