= Axstane Hundred =

Historical division of Kent, England

Axstane
- Former subdivision of England
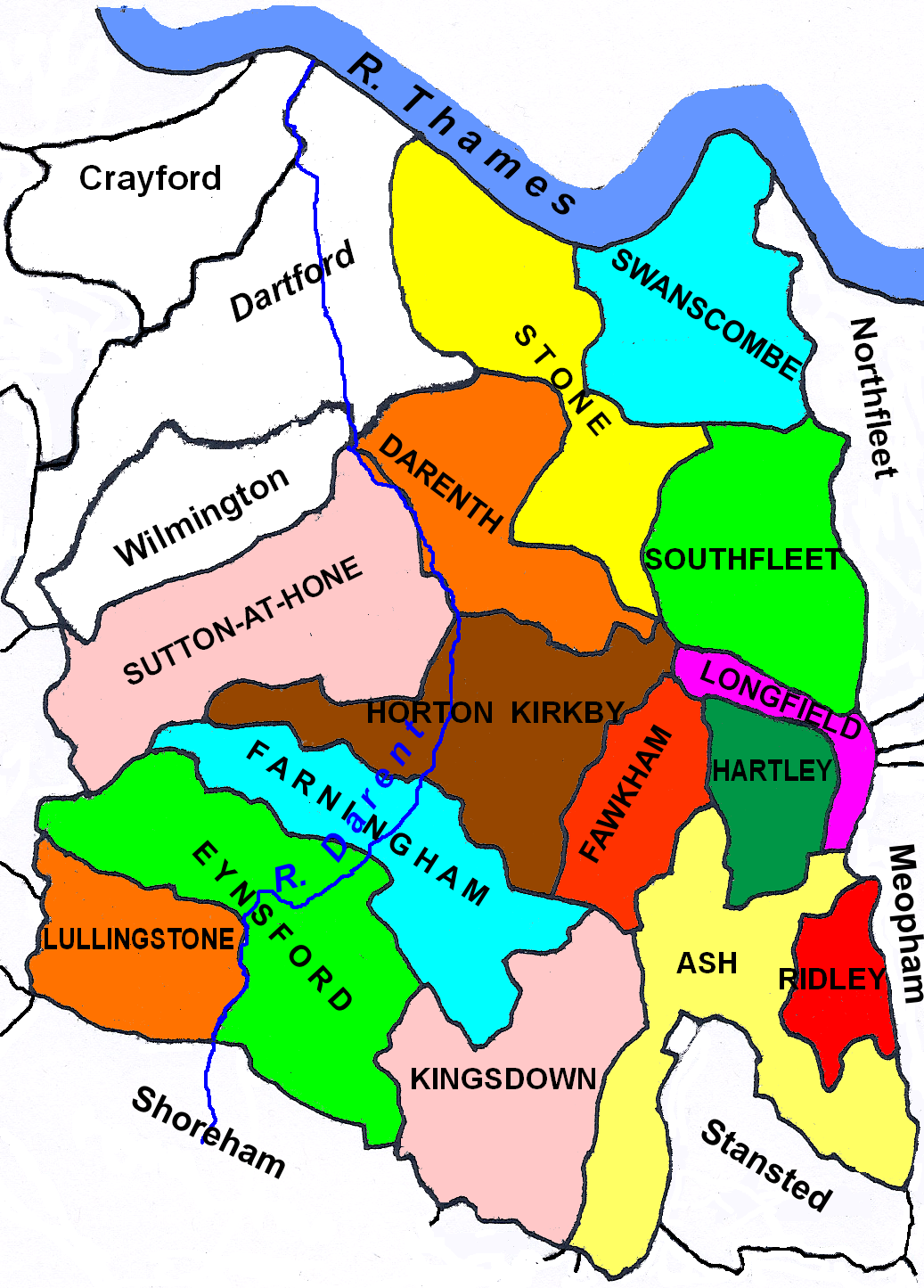
- Map showing the parishes of the hundred of Axstane
- Area
  - Coordinates: 51.395480°N 0.326980°E
- History
  - Origin: Anglo-Saxon period
  - Created: 10th century
  - Abolished: 1894
  - Succeeded by: Dartford Rural District
- Status: obsolete
- Government: Hundred
- Subdivisions
  - Type: Parishes (see text)
  - Units: Parishes

Axstane was a hundred in the county of Kent, England. The Hundred of Axstane lay south-east of Dartford and Wilmington Hundred. It is called Achestan in the Domesday Book of 1086, but by the reign of Edward I it was called Axstane.

Its name has been interpreted as referring to an oak-bearing stony land, or alternatively a reference to the personal name Acca.

In the time of Edward I, the King and the Archbishop of Canterbury were then its lords paramount. In the 20th year of the reign of Edward III (1347, just before the Black Death) this hundred answered for a total of 14.725 knights' fees.

Alternative spellings: Achestan (as above), Axston, Axstone, Axtane, Axton

The hundred included the parishes of

- Ash
- Darenth
- Eynsford
- Farningham
- Fawkham
- Hartley
- Horton Kirby
- Longfield
- Lullingstone
- Ridley
- Southfleet
- Stone
- Swanscombe
- Sutton-at-Hone
- Kingsdown

The Hundred of Dartford and Wilmington did not exist at the time of the Norman Conquest in 1066, and the parishes of Dartford and Wilmington were accounted as part of Axstane in the Domesday Book of 1086.

The importance of the hundred courts declined from the 17th century, and most of their powers were extinguished with the establishment of county courts in 1867. In 1894 the Hundred was succeeded by Dartford Rural District, which was then created out of the same parishes, with the addition of Wilmington and Crayford.

== Dartford Poor Law Union ==
Dartford Poor Law Union was formed on 19 May 1836, covering roughly the same area as the Hundred of Axstane. Its operation was overseen by an elected Board of Guardians, 24 in number, representing the following 21 constituent parishes (figures in brackets indicate numbers of Guardians if more than one): Ash, Bexley (2), Crayford (2), Darenth, Dartford (2), Eynsford, Erith, Farningham, Fawkham, Hartley, Horton Kirby, Kingsdown, Longfield, Lullingstone, Ridley, Southfleet, Stone, Sutton-at-Hone, Swanscombe, East Wickham, Wilmington.

The area was 34,139 acres (138 km^{2}). Population in 1851: 9,869; Houses: 1,852.

The population by parish was as follows:

| Parish | Area (acres) | Pop. 1851 | Pop. 1891 | Comments |
|---|---|---|---|---|
| Ash | 3,074 | 702 | 619 | Merged into Ash-cum-Ridley 1 April 1955 |
| Darenth | 2,223 | 654 | 2801 | |
| Eynsford | 3,544 | 1,323 | 1,841 | |
| Farningham | 2,739 | 701 | 879 | |
| Fawkham | 1,198 | 249 | 232 | |
| Hartley | 1,211 | 227 | 272 | |
| Horton Kirby | 2,841 | 747 | 1,551 | |
| Kingsdown | 2,813 | 423 | 412 | Renamed West Kingsdown 1 August 1948 |
| Longfield | 605 | 162 | 498 | |
| Lullingstone | 1557 | 51 | 64 | Abolished 1 April 1955. |
| Ridley | 834 | 91 | 86 | Abolished 1 April 1955 |
| Southfleet | 2,409 | 657 | 968 | |
| Stone | 3,009 | 829 | 3,773 | |
| Sutton at Hone | 3,625 | 1,290 | 3,847 | Swanley parish created 1 April 1955 |
| Swanscombe | 2,141 | 1,763 | 6,577 | |
| TOTAL | 33,823 | 9,869 | 24,420 | |

The Hundred of Axstane belonged to the Lathe of Sutton at Hone.
