= Shep =

Shep is most commonly a nickname or hypocorism, short for Shepherd, Shephard or Shepard. It may refer to:

== People ==
=== Given name ===
- Shep Gordon (born 1945), American talent manager, Hollywood film agent and producer
- Shep Messing (born 1949), American Olympic soccer goalkeeper and current broadcaster

=== Nickname ===
- Shep Goodman, 21st century American music producer and songwriter
- Shep Mayer (1923–2005), Canadian ice hockey player
- Shep Meyers (1936–2009), American pianist, composer, arranger and conductor
- Shep Pettibone (born 1959), American music producer, remixer, songwriter and club DJ
- Shepard Smith (born 1964), American former broadcast journalist
- Charles Shepard (artist) (J. Charles M. Shepard; 1892–1962), English artist and sculptor
- David Shepherd (umpire) (1940–2009), English cricketer and cricket umpire
- Jean Shepherd (1921–1999), American raconteur, radio and TV personality, writer and actor
- Nicholas Shepard (2000–present), Also known as Shep, American videographer and musician

=== Stage name ===
- Shep Fields, American band leader born Saul Feldman (1910–1981)
- James Sheppard (1935–1970), lead singer of the Heartbeats and later Shep and the Limelites
- Shep Shepherd, American jazz musician Berisford Shepherd (1917–2018)

== Dogs ==
- Shep (American dog), a dog that lived in the Great Northern train station in Fort Benton, Montana, in the late 1930s
- Shep (British dog), a Blue Peter dog, a border collie, remembered by British TV viewers as inseparable from John Noakes
- Shep (dog actor), a dog which became known for appearances in Thanhouser films of the silent period

== Fictional characters ==
- Shep, George of the Jungle's elephant companion
- Shep, from the animated movie Interstella 5555: The 5tory of the 5ecret 5tar 5ystem
- Shep, from the animated series Steven Universe Future

== Other uses ==
- Shep (sculpture), a sculpture of a semipalmated sandpiper in Dorchester, New Brunswick, Canada

== See also ==
- "Old Shep", a song
