= Lathe of Scray =

Division of Kent, England

Scray
- Former subdivision of England
- History
  - Origin: Merger of Milton and Wye Lathes
  - Created: 13th century
  - Abolished: 1894 (obsolescent)
  - Succeeded by: diverse authorities
- Status: obsolete
- Government: Lathe
- Subdivisions
  - Type: Hundreds

The Lathe of Scray is an historic division of the county of Kent, England, encompassing the present-day Districts of Swale, Ashford, and the eastern part of Tunbridge Wells The Lathes of Kent were ancient administration divisions originating, probably, in the 6th century, during the Jutish colonisation of the county.

Scray (alternative spelling: Scraye) was not one of the original lathes and did not exist at the time of the Domesday Book of 1086, there existing in its place the "Half Lathe" of Milton and the Lathe of Wye. The half lathe of Milton consisted only of the hundred of Milton, including most of Sheppey. The lathe of Wye consisted of the remainder of the later lathe of Scray, except for the hundreds of Blackbourne, Rolvenden and Selbrittenden (Silverden), then being in Limen (Lympne) (later renamed Shepway) lathe. By 1295 the lathe of Scray was in existence, based on a merger of Milton and Wye. In the 11th, 12th and 13th centuries the hundreds of Barkley, Cranbrook, East Barnfield, Marden, and Tenterden were established within the lathe of Scray. The placename "Scray" is recorded in 1278 as Scherewynghop, derived from Old English sċrēawa (pronounced [ˈʃræ͜ɑː.wɑ]), "shrew" or "devil", and hop ("'a small enclosed valley" or "piece of enclosed land in the midst of marshes").

Lathe of Scray, showing hundreds

The lathe was bordered on the west by the Lathe of Aylesford and on the east by the Lathes of Shepway and St. Augustine. According to Hasted, the Lathe of Scray consisted of the following Hundreds:

- Barkley
- Blackbourne
- Boughton
- Calehill
- Chart and Longbridge
- Cranbrook
- East Barnfield
- Faversham
- Felborough
- Longbridge
- Marden
- Milton
- Rolvenden
- Selbrittenden
- Tenterden
- Teynham
- Wye

Within the Lathe of Scray is the Isle of Sheppey, which is separated from the rest of the county of Kent by a narrow arm of the sea, called the Swale. Almost all of Sheppey is within the hundred of Milton, except the conjoined island of Harty, which is within the hundred of Faversham. That part of the hundred of Milton in the island of Sheppey, was within the jurisdiction of one constable, appointed for it at the court-leet held for the manor and hundred of Milton, and this part of the hundred of Milton was styled the Liberty of Sheppey. See map.

The Lathe was an important administrative, judicial and taxation unit for 600 years after the Domesday Book. The functions of Lathe and hundreds were somewhat similar, with a Lathe covering a much wider area. Although not abolished, it has no administrative functions today. The Sheriff toured the county twice yearly attending on the lathes. The lathe was responsible for raising of aids and subsidies for the Militia. However the Lathe court became anomalous as it fell between the hundredal courts below and the justices of the county (in petty and quarter sessions) above

The Lathe and division of the Lathe were the basis for meetings of local justices of the peace in monthly or petty sessions. These were established on a regular footing at a particularly early date in Kent. Lambarde in his Perambulation of Kent (1576) gives the Distribution of the Shyre for Execution of Justice. Scray was divided into an Upper and Lower Division, while a group of hundreds in the middle of the Lathe of Scray, centred on Ashford, were for convenience attached to the Lathe of Shepway for petty sessional purposes. From time to time existing divisions were split for sake of convenience and in 1857 the provisions of the Reform Act 1832 were invoked to re-examine the whole structure

The Lower Division of Scray, which formed the southernmost part of the Lathe, consisted of the following Hundreds:

- Barkley
- Blackbourne
- Cranbrook
- East Barnfield
- Marden
- Rolvenden
- Selbrittenden
- Tenterden

The remainder of the Lathe formed the Upper Division.

The Quarter Sessions of the county were held at both Canterbury, for East Kent and at Maidstone for West Kent. The Lower Division of Scray belonged to West Kent and the Upper Division to East Kent. Scray was the only Lathe that was divided between the two major divisions of the county. For the purpose of Petty Sessions the Hundreds of Calehill, Chart And Longbridge, Felborough, and Wye were attached to Shepway. When by the Great Reform Act 1832 the parliamentary representation of the county of Kent was increased and the county was divided in two, the above division of the county was used.

Although not formally abolished, hundreds and lathes fell out of usage at the end of the 19th century.

The Lathe of Scray has an area of 260,510 acres (407 sq. miles).
