= Dartford Rural District =

Former local government area in the UK

Coordinates: 51°23′N 0°16′E

Dartford
- Area
  - 1911: 37,997 acres (153.77 km^{2})
  - 1931: 33,400 acres (135 km^{2})
  - 1961: 34,037 acres (137.74 km^{2})
- Population
  - 1911: 39,909
  - 1931: 31,141
  - 1961: 53,212
- Density
  - 1911: 1.1/acre
  - 1931: 0.9/acre
  - 1961: 1.6/acre
- History
  - Created: 1894
  - Abolished: 1974
  - Succeeded by: Dartford, Sevenoaks
- Government: Dartford Rural District Council
  - HQ: Swanley

Dartford Rural District was a rural district with an area of 34,037 acres (138 km^{2}) in the county of Kent, England. In 1971 it had a population of 64,561 and an electorate of 43,911. At dissolution it was the most populous rural district council in Kent, but had once been larger, having lost territory when Crayford Urban District was created in 1920, and Swanscombe Urban District in 1926.

On 1 April 1974 it was split between the borough of Dartford and the new district of Sevenoaks. The civil parishes of Ash-cum-Ridley, Eynsford, Eynsford-Crockenhill, Farningham, Fawkham, Hartley, Horton Kirby, Swanley, and West Kingsdown, all of which became part of Sevenoaks District, are sometimes still collectively referred to as the 'Northern Parishes'. Longfield civil parish originally went to Sevenoaks, but was transferred to Dartford Borough in 1987.

At the time of its dissolution it consisted of the following 15 civil parishes. In 1971 it had 27 councillors who held office for 3 years. Elections for one-third of the seats were held every year.

- Ash-cum-Ridley (1 councillor)
- Darenth (2 councillors)
- Eynsford (1 councillor)
- Eynsford-Crockenhill (1 councillor)
- Farningham (1 councillor)
- Fawkham (1 councillor)
- Hartley (1 councillor)
- Horton Kirby (1 councillor)
- Longfield (1 councillor)
- Southfleet (1 councillor)
- Stone (4 councillors)
- Sutton-at-Hone (2 councillors)
- Swanley (6 councillors)
- West Kingsdown (1 councillor)
- Wilmington (3 councillors)
