= Hundred of Bromley and Beckenham =

Historical division of Kent, England

Bromley and Beckenham
- Map published in 1797 showing the hundred of Bromley and Beckenham with the hundred of Ruxley.
- History
  - Created: in antiquity
  - Abolished: 1884 - 1965
- Status: obsolete
- Government: hundred
- Subdivisions
  - Type: Parishes
  - Units: Bromley, Beckenham

Bromley and Beckenham was an ancient hundred in the north west of the county of Kent, England. It comprised the ancient parishes of Bromley and Beckenham.
