= West Kent =

- Proposed unitary authority area
- Interactive map
- Coordinates: 51.2734°N 0.5221°E
- Sovereign state: United Kingdom
- Country: England
- Region: South East
- Ceremonial county: Kent

Government
  - Type: Unitary authority
  - Body: West Kent Council

Area
  - Total: 515 sq mi (1,334 km^{2})

Population (2024 estimate)
  - Total: 567,062
- Time zone: UTC+0 (GMT)
  - Summer (DST): UTC+1 (BST)

West Kent was a proposed unitary authority area in Kent, England. It was planned to be formed on 1 April 2028. The largest settlement would have been Maidstone, the county town of Kent, and it would have also included Tunbridge Wells, Tonbridge, Sevenoaks, Ditton, and Swanley.

It wast to be formed from the Maidstone, Sevenoaks, Tonbridge and Malling and Tunbridge Wells districts.

Maidstone, Tunbridge Wells and Tonbridge are currently unparished, and the rest of the area is parished. The area has a 2024 estimated population of 567,062. Plans to create it were halted in September 2026 and the first election was cancelled. In October 2026, the plans to create it were withdrawn.

== History ==
=== Pre-21st century ===
Under different boundaries, defined as the area west of the River Medway, West Kent was a traditional subdivision of Kent. It was advocated by the Association of the Men of Kent and Kentish Men, an organisation formed in 1913. The division may have risen from the ethnic differences approximately 1,500 years ago between the Jutish settlement of the east of the county and the Saxon presence in the west, although its origins are somewhat obscure. Residents of the traditional East Kent are called 'Men (or Maids) of Kent', as opposed to residents of West Kent, who are known as 'Kentish Men' or 'Kentish Maids'.

According to the BBC, a few hundred years later, it appears that the Men of Kent resisted William the Conqueror more stoutly than the Kentish Men, who surrendered.

West Kent had its own Quarter Sessions based in Maidstone until 1814, when the administrations of East and West Kent were merged. The West Kent Quarter Sessions Division consisted of the Lathe of Aylesford, the Lathe of Sutton-at-Hone and the lower division of the Lathe of Scray.

=== 21st century ===
The modern West Kent was first formed by proposals brought by Kent district councils as part of structural changes to local government in England which began in 2024. Prior to the local government reform, most of Kent had a two-tier system where Kent County Council and would provide local services.

Following the 2024 Devolution White Paper, the ruling Labour Party announced that the government would seek to establish unitary authorities in the remaining two-tier areas including Kent. In February 2025, the government wrote to the local authorities in Kent asking them to submit proposals for two-tier areas under the Local Government and Public Involvement in Health Act 2007. A West Kent district was included in all the proposals brought forward by district councils while a single-unitary option merging Kent and Medway was supported by the county council.

Option 4b, with the boundaries as planned, was selected by the government in July 2026. The alternative proposal for four unitaries and the proposals for a single unitary, or three or five unitaries were not accepted. The district councils in West Kent all supported Option 3a, which would also have been the district established on its planned boundaries.

In September 2026, the Kent proposals were halted by the government and placed under review. In October 2026, plans to create it were withdrawn. The decision was threatened with judicial review by Kent County Council.

== Governance ==
It would have been run by West Kent Council, which would have comprised 84 councillors.

== See also ==
- Queen's Own Royal West Kent Regiment
