= Sevenoaks District =

Coordinates: 51.270°N 0.193°E

Sevenoaks
- Non-metropolitan district
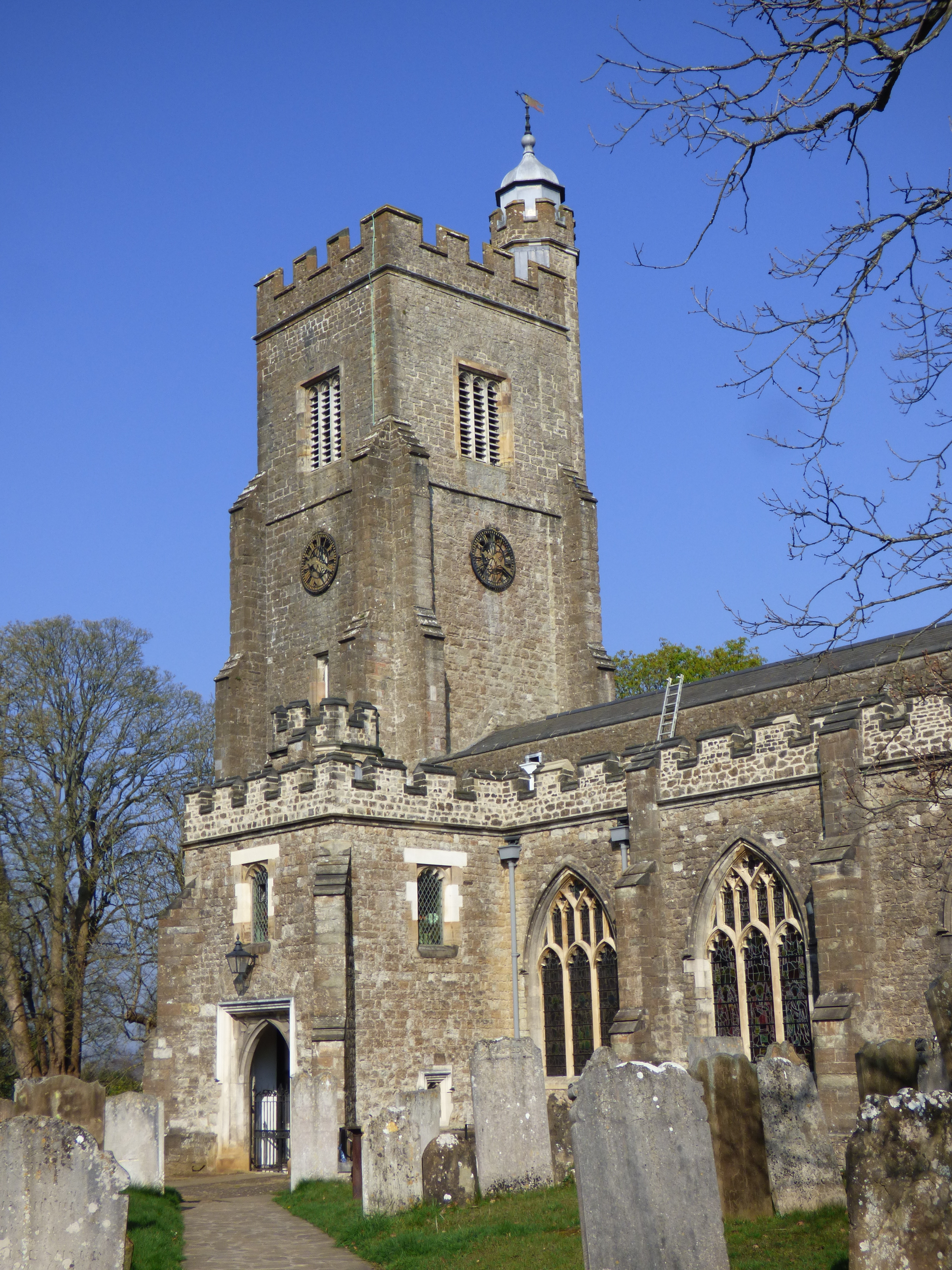
- St Nicholas Church in Sevenoaks

- Sevenoaks shown within Kent
- Sovereign state: United Kingdom
- Constituent country: England
- Region: South East England
- Non-metropolitan county: Kent
- Status: Non-metropolitan district
- Admin HQ: Sevenoaks
- Incorporated: 1 April 1974

Government
  - Type: Non-metropolitan district council
  - Body: Sevenoaks District Council
  - Leadership: Leader & Cabinet (No overall control)
  - MPs: Laura Trott; Jim Dickson; Tom Tugendhat

Area
  - Total: 142.99 sq mi (370.34 km^{2})
  - Rank: 94th (of 296)

Population (2024)
  - Total: 122,748
  - Rank: 200th (of 296)
  - Density: 858.44/sq mi (331.45/km^{2})

Ethnicity (2021)
  - Ethnic groups: List: 92.1% White; 2.9% Asian; 2.6% Mixed; 1.6% Black; 0.8% other

Religion (2021)
  - Religion: List: 51.8% Christianity; 39.5% no religion; 5.9% not stated; 0.9% Islam; 0.7% Hinduism; 0.4% Buddhism; 0.3% other; 0.2% Sikhism; 0.2% Judaism
- Time zone: UTC0 (GMT)
  - Summer (DST): UTC+1 (BST)
- ONS code: 29UK (ONS); E07000111 (GSS)
- OS grid reference: TQ525555

Sevenoaks is a local government district in west Kent, England. Its council is based in the town of Sevenoaks.

The district was formed on 1 April 1974 by the merger of Sevenoaks Urban District, Sevenoaks Rural District and part of Dartford Rural District.

Under current local government reorganisation plans, all district councils in Kent, as well as the county council, will be abolished in 2028, with the district becoming part of a new West Kent unitary authority.

== Geography ==
The area is approximately evenly divided between buildings and infrastructure on the one hand and woodland or agricultural fields on the other. It contains the upper valley of the River Darenth and some headwaters of the River Eden.

The vast majority of the district is covered by the Metropolitan Green Belt.

In terms of districts, it borders Dartford to the north, Gravesham to the northeast, Tonbridge and Malling to the east, briefly Tunbridge Wells to the southeast. It also borders two which, equal to it, do not have borough status, the Wealden district of East Sussex to the south and the Tandridge district of Surrey to the southwest. It borders the London Boroughs of Bromley and Bexley to the northwest.

In the 2021 Census, the district had a population of 120,514.

== Governance ==
Sevenoaks District Council

Type
- Type: Non-metropolitan district

Leadership
- Chair: Margot McArthur, Independent since 14 May 2026
- Leader: Kevin Maskell, Conservative since 18 November 2025
- Chief Executive: Pav Ramewal since 2013

Structure
- Seats: 54 councillors
- Political groups: Administration (26) Conservatives (26) Other parties (28) Liberal Democrats (14) Independent (8) Green (4) Reform UK (2)

Elections
- Last election: 4 May 2023

Meeting place
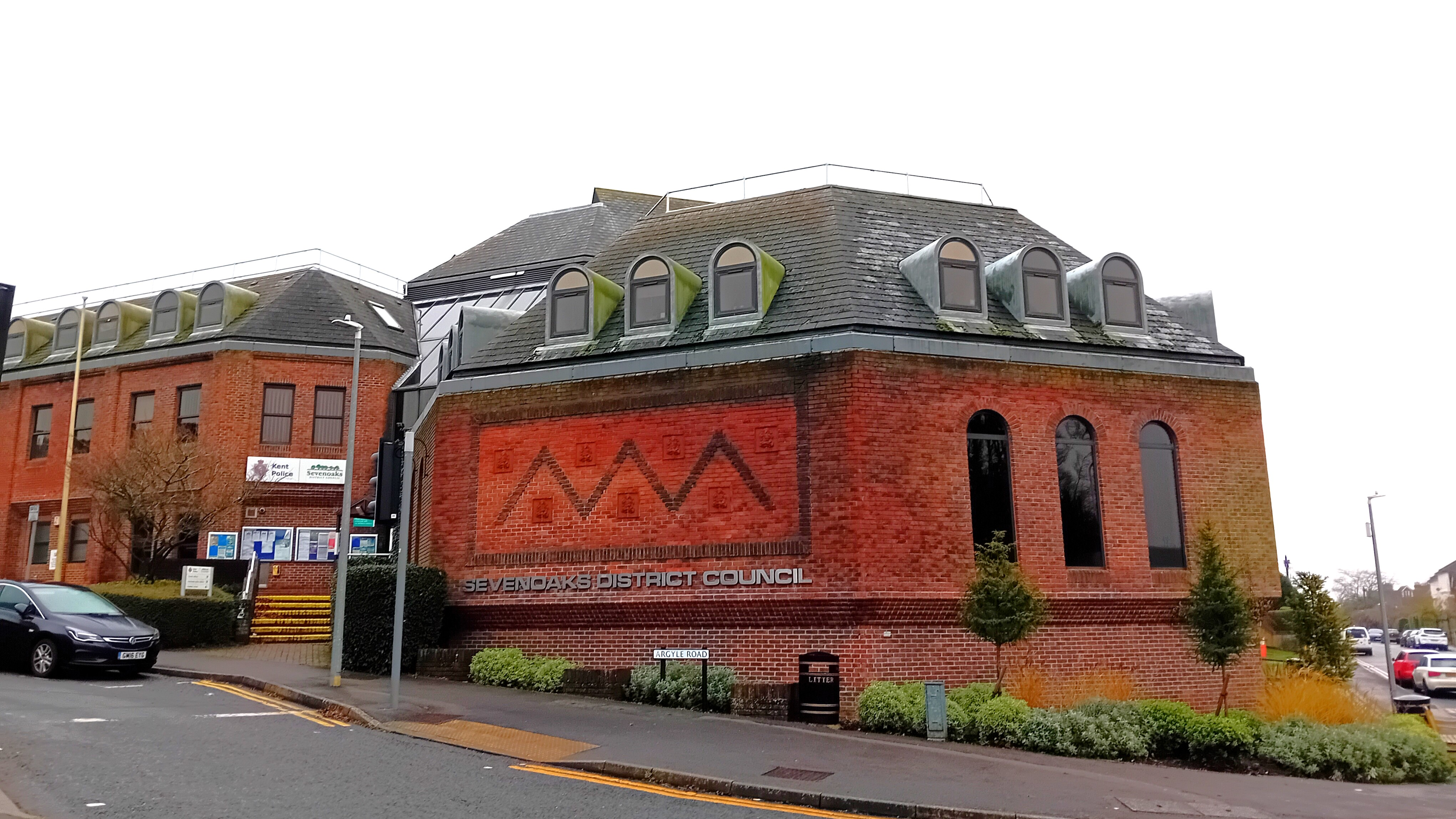
- Council Offices, Argyle Road, Sevenoaks, TN13 1HG

Website
- www.sevenoaks.gov.uk

Sevenoaks District Council provides district-level services. County-level services are provided by Kent County Council. The whole district is also covered by civil parishes, which form a third tier of local government.

In 2009 the Audit Commission named Sevenoaks District Council as one of the four best-run and most efficient councils in the country.

=== Political control ===
The council has been under no overall control since May 2025, when a number of Conservative councillors left the party, which had previously held a majority of the council's seats.

The first election to the council was held in 1973, initially operating as a shadow authority alongside the outgoing authorities before coming into its powers on 1 April 1974. Political control of the council since 1974 has been as follows:

Party in control	Years
Conservative	1974–1995
No overall control	1995–1999
Conservative	1999–2025
No overall control	2025–present

=== Leadership ===
The leaders of the council since 1999 have been:

Councillor	Party	From	To
Alison Cook	Conservative	1999	10 May 2005
Peter Fleming	Conservative	10 May 2005	May 2023
Julia Thornton	Conservative	23 May 2023	May 2024
Roddy Hogarth	Conservative	14 May 2024	18 Nov 2025
Kevin Maskell	Conservative	18 Nov 2025	Current

=== Composition ===
Following the 2023 election and subsequent changes of allegiance up to June 2026, the composition of the council was as follows:

Party	Councillors
Conservative	26
Liberal Democrats	14
Green	4
Reform	2
Independent	8
Total	54

Six of the independent councillors form the "West Kent Independents" group (all of whom were elected as Conservatives), and the other two independent councillors form the "North Sevenoaks District Independent Group".

=== Elections ===
Since the last full review of boundaries in 2003 the council has comprised 54 councillors, representing 26 wards. Elections are held every four years.

=== Premises ===
The council is based at the Council Offices on Argyle Road. The offices were built for the council on the site of a large house which had served as the offices of one of the council's predecessors, the Sevenoaks Urban District Council. The new building was formally opened on 3 March 1986.

== Housing and architecture ==
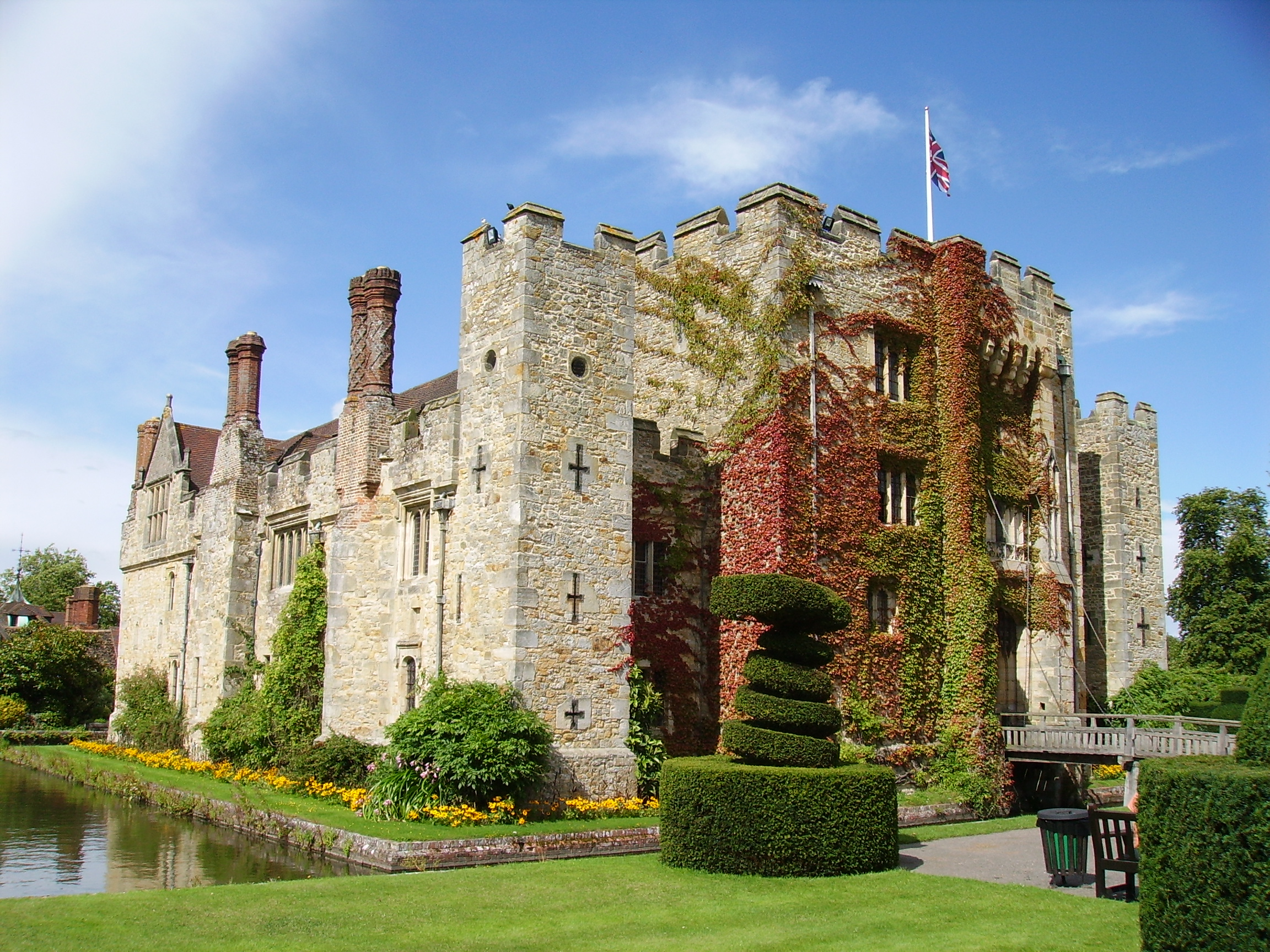
Hever Castle is in Sevenoaks district

The layout of the district is dual-centred:

- A well-buffered suburban town itself, which spreads into suburban villages (St Johns, Riverhead, Dunton Green, Sevenoaks Weald).
- Swanley and smaller, equally buffered Hextable and Crockenhill within the M25 motorway.

In all areas low-rise dominates: the incidence of flats exceeding two storeys is rare.

The number of listed buildings in the district exceeds 150. This includes 16 churches listed in the highest grading in the national listing system (Grade I). Castles and English country houses of the wealthiest in society from the 16th to 18th centuries form part of this district.

Examples at Grade I include Knole House, Chartwell, Penshurst Place and Chevening House, most of which have their own produce-selling farms. Older with original stone walls are Hever Castle with its 16 acres (6.5 ha)-wooded island in a listed parkland. A folly exists at Lullingstone Castle which is a reconstruction of its gatehouse and separate modern house.

== Towns and parishes ==
The whole district is covered by civil parishes. The parish councils for Sevenoaks and Swanley are styled as town councils.

- Ash-cum-Ridley
- Badgers Mount
- Brasted
- Chevening
- Chiddingstone
- Cowden
- Crockenhill
- Dunton Green
- Edenbridge
- Eynsford
- Farningham
- Fawkham
- Halstead
- Hartley
- Hextable
- Hever
- Horton Kirby and South Darenth
- Kemsing
- Knockholt
- Leigh
- Otford
- Penshurst
- Riverhead
- Seal
- Sevenoaks (Town)
- Sevenoaks Weald
- Shoreham
- Sundridge with Ide Hill
- Swanley (Town)
- Westerham
- West Kingsdown

== See also ==
- List of places of worship in Sevenoaks District
