= Lathe (county subdivision) =

Division of Kent, England

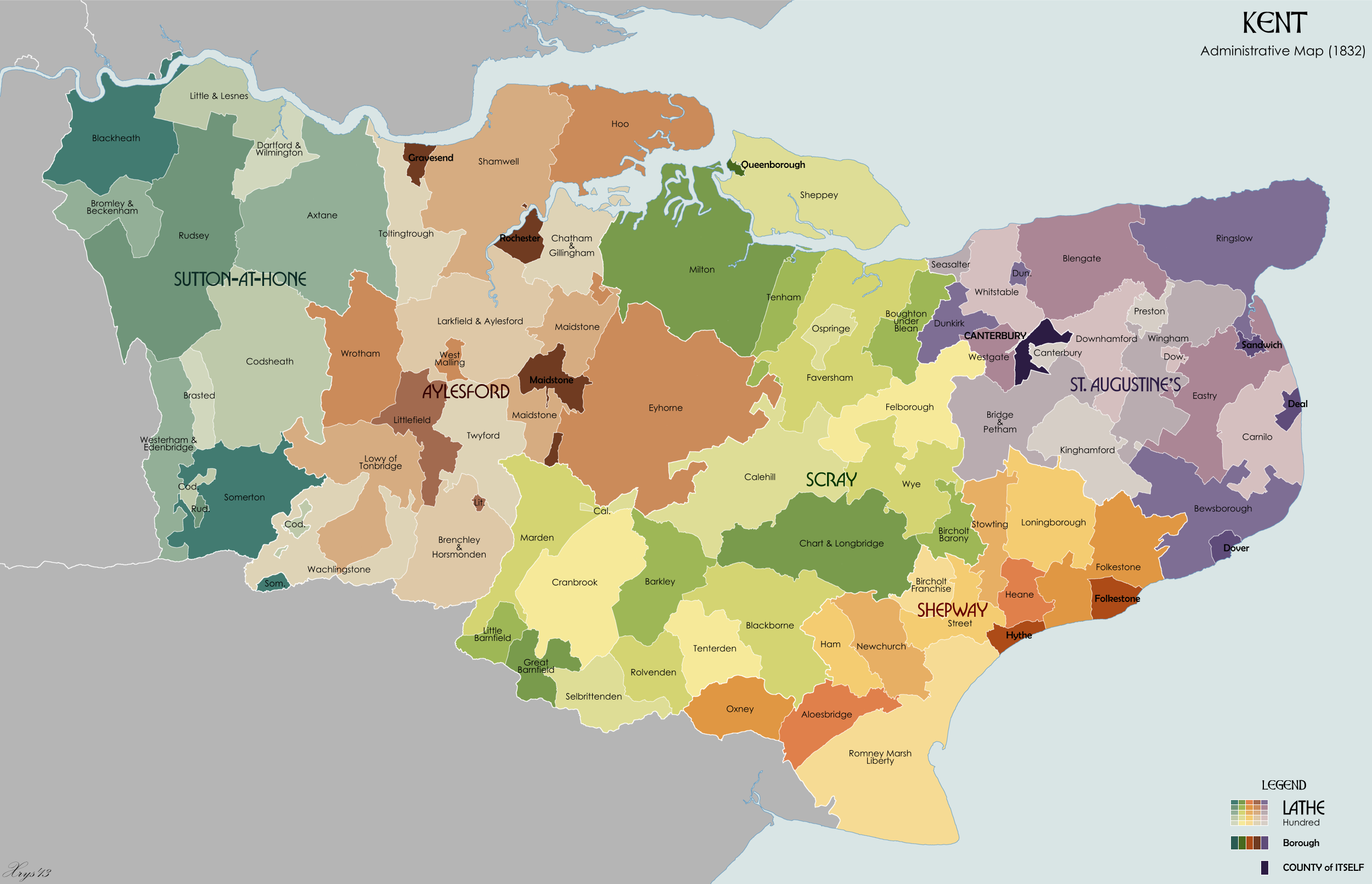
Map of lathes and hundreds of Kent

A lathe (/ˈleɪð/; Old English: lǽð; Latin: lestus) formed an administrative country subdivision of the county of Kent, England, from the Anglo-Saxon period, until it fell out of general practical use in the early twentieth century.

Etymologically, the word lathe may derive from a Proto-Germanic root meaning "land" or "landed possession", possibly cognate with the Greek λᾰ́τρον (latron, "payment").

== List ==
By the late eleventh century the traditional area of West Kent comprised three lathes:

- Lathe of Aylesford
- Lathe of Milton
- Lathe of Sutton

while East Kent comprised four lathes:

- Lathe of Borough
- Lathe of Eastry
- Lathe of Lympne
- Lathe of Wye

Of these, Sutton-at-Hone and Milton sometimes ranked as half-lathes.

In the thirteenth century Kent had a total of five lathes:

- the lathes of Borough and Eastry merged to form the Lathe of St. Augustine
- the lathe of Lympne underwent a name-change to become the Lathe of Shepway
- the lathes Milton and Wye merged to form the Lathe of Scray
- the Lathe of Aylesford survived unchanged.

== History ==
The lathe was an ancient division of Kent and originated, probably in the 6th century, during the Jutish colonisation of the county. There exists a widespread belief that lathes originally formed around the royal settlements of the Kingdom of Kent. By the late Anglo-Saxon period they seem to have become purely administrative units, each of which contained several hundreds.

The lathe was an important administrative, judicial and taxation unit for 600 years after the Domesday Book of 1086. The functions of lathe and hundreds were somewhat similar, with a lathe covering a much wider area. Although never formally abolished, they have no administrative functions today. The Sheriff toured the county twice yearly attending on the lathes, in the case of Sutton at Hone, possibly at Shire Hall. The lathe was responsible for the raising of aids and subsidies for the Militia. However the lathe court became anomalous as it fell between the hundredal courts below and the justices of the county (in petty and quarter sessions) above.

The lathe and division of the lathe were the basis for meetings of local justices of the peace in monthly or petty sessions. These were established on a regular footing at a particularly early date in Kent. Lambarde in his Perambulation of Kent (1576) gives the Distribution of the Shyre for Execution of Justice. Sutton at Hone and St Augustine were each divided into two divisions and Aylesford into three. In an exception to this scheme, a group of hundreds in the middle of the Lathe of Scray, centred on Ashford, were for convenience attached to the Lathe of Shepway for petty sessional purposes. Also the Corporation of Romney Marsh in this lathe possessed its own quarter and petty sessions (separate from the county). From time to time existing divisions were split for sake of convenience and in 1857 the provisions of the act of 9 Geo. 4 were invoked to re-examine the whole structure.

Although not formally abolished, hundreds and lathes fell out of usage at the end of the 19th century, with, for example, the Lathe of Sutton last being used as a unit in the London Gazette, the newspaper for governmental orders, as late as 1899. However Shepway reappeared as a principal local government division of Kent in 1974, within roughly the same area as previously; the name was abandoned in 2018 in favour of Folkestone and Hythe.

The five lathes

The area of each lathe in 1831 was as follows:

| Lathe | Area (acres) | Area (sq.miles) | Area (km^{2}) |
|---|---|---|---|
| Saint Augustine | 166,760 | 260 | 675 |
| Shepway | 127,380 | 199 | 515 |
| Scray | 260,510 | 407 | 1,054 |
| Aylesford | 244,150 | 381 | 988 |
| Sutton at Hone | 173,440 | 271 | 702 |
| TOTAL | 972,240 | 1,519 | 3,935 |

== See also ==
- Parts of Lincolnshire
- Rape
- Riding
