= Abbey Wood (disambiguation) =

Abbey Wood is a district in south London, England.

Abbey Wood may also refer to:

- Abbey Wood, Flixton, Suffolk, England
- Abbey Wood (Havering)
- Abbey Wood (ward), in Greenwich
- Lesnes Abbey Woods
- MoD Abbey Wood
- Abbey Wood railway station
- Filton Abbey Wood railway station

== See also ==
- Abbeywood, Queensland, Australia
- Abbie Wood (born 1999), English swimmer
