= Belvedere, London =

Town in south east London, England

Coordinates: 51.4856°N 0.1541°E

Belvedere
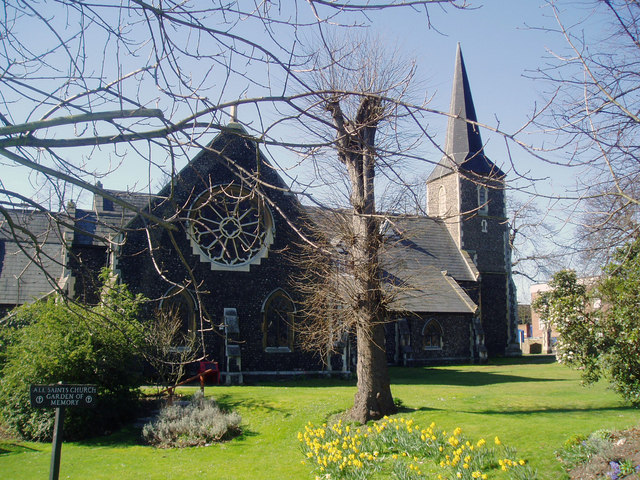
- All Saints Church

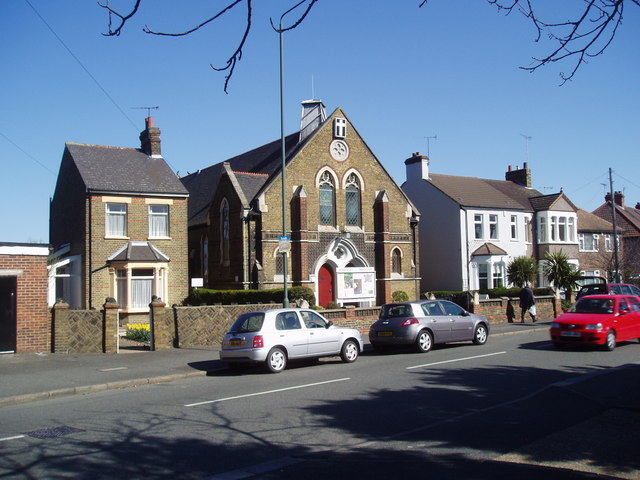
- Belvedere and Erith Congregational Church

- Location within Greater London
- Population: 11,890 (ward, 2011)
- OS grid reference: TQ495785
- London borough: Bexley
- Ceremonial county: Greater London
- Region: London
- Country: England
- Sovereign state: United Kingdom
- Post town: BELVEDERE
- Postcode district: DA17
- Post town: LONDON
- Postcode district: SE2
- Dialling code: 020; 01322
- Police: Metropolitan
- Fire: London
- Ambulance: London
- UK Parliament: Erith and Thamesmead
- London Assembly: Bexley and Bromley

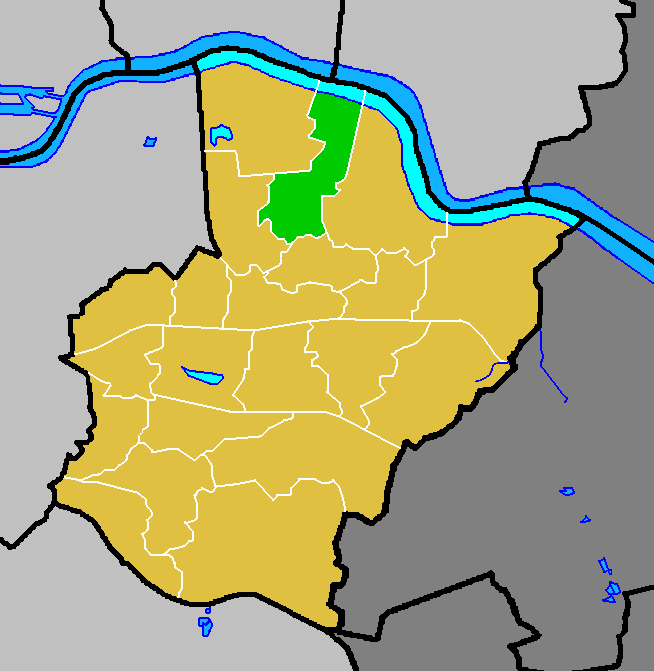
Belvedere ward (green) within the London Borough of Bexley (yellow)

Belvedere /ˈbɛlvədɪər/ is a town in south east London, England, within the London Borough of Bexley. It lies close to the River Thames, with Erith to the east, Bexleyheath to the south, and Abbey Wood and Thamesmead to the west. Before the creation of Greater London in 1965, Belvedere was in the administrative county of Kent.

== History ==
The area which is today known as Belvedere was for centuries part of Lessness Heath, the eastern parts of a narrow high ridge which stretches from the area of Lesnes Abbey to Erith. The northern stretch is industrial and environmental and was common meadow. In 1847 this largely uncultivated, wooded estate, almost undivided was given by operation of the will of last Lord Saye and Sele to his cousin Sir Culling Eardley, who built properties in Belvedere until his death in 1863. Eardley constructed a large wooden tower (see Belvedere (structure)) on the heath to gain views over his estate to the river Thames, giving the area its name from the Italian "beautiful view". The name can also be applied today, as the ridge of the area, and parts of its southern uplands, have commanding views towards Canary Wharf and Central London. (Note: For example in (and from certain homes in) the central and southern streets, Heron Hill and Ruskin Road.)

Eardley was persuaded to allow the construction on his property, of a Dissenters' chapel, which was built so that the original wooden belvedere became its tower. In order that the public were able to attend this chapel, he constructed paths to it across Lessness Heath. Eardley had finished in 1861, after nearly 8 years of building, his chapel, now All Saints' Church, after the earlier chapel with belvedere burned down on the same site. At the same time Eardley constructed Villa Houses and reinforced the heath path to become Erith Road. Belvedere village soon grew up along the path which became Bexley Road (from March 1939 known as Nuxley road after the small heath located 1 km south) as Eardley gradually sold off the land.

Belvedere explosion of 1864

At about 6:40 am on Saturday the first of October 1864 there was a massive explosion which totally destroyed two commercial gunpowder factories, situated in isolation on the Belvedere side of Erith Marshes, along with their store magazines and a couple of barges that were being loaded with barrels of gunpowder at the time. The explosion was heard over a 50 miles radius, and the shock wave was so intense that people in central London were convinced that there had been an earthquake. One report at the time said that as rescuers hurried to the site they found a massive crater and absolutely no signs of any buildings were left; “it was if the place had been swept clean by a broom”. There were only around twenty casualties, as though the explosion was huge, the remote location prevented greater loss of life.

1900 to date

Belvedere was in Kent and formed part of the Municipal Borough of Erith before 1965 and development took place before the Second World War, with significant reconstruction after the Blitz. Despite this, Upper Belvedere and The Village still retains much of its Victorian and Edwardian charm and character. Between 1898 and 1961 Callender's Cable Works, at the Erith Works, Belvedere, was patron to Callender's Cableworks Band, an amateur brass band made up of employees of the company. The band was a prolific broadcaster on BBC Radio in the 1920s and 1930s.

Flood of 1953

The North Sea Flood of 1953 hit the area of Belvedere Marshes badly, leaving the 1700 gypsies who lived there with nothing. One person died in the flooding and hundreds had their homes damaged. Queen Elizabeth II came to visit the communities of Erith and Belvedere, who were without electricity for weeks, to pay her respects.

Controversy over name

There has been a lot of controversy with local residents over recent years about the correct name of the "village" area of Belvedere incorporating the triangle of Nuxley Road, Albert Road, and Woolwich Road. Council road signs call it Belvedere Village, maps and the post office list the area as Belvedere, but some locals call it Nuxley Village after the road. Many residents informally call the area "The Village". The origins of Nuxley Village is believed to come from estate agents upselling the area.

== Subdistricts ==
Within the ward are:

- Erith Marshes/Crossness Nature Reserve
- Abbey Wood, Bostall Heath and Woods, Lesnes Abbey, Thamesmead, and West Heath.

== Landmarks ==
Upper Belvedere has a fine church and some fine Victorian and Edwardian brick villas. It has a number of fine pubs, restaurants and retail outlets: The Eardley Arms and the Prince of Wales on Woolwich Road, The Victoria on Victoria Street, The Royal Standard, The Village Inn (formerly the Queens Head) and The Fox all on Nuxley Road. Upper Belvedere is also home to a large park and a branch library that was in danger of being closed due to central government funding cuts. Fortunately closure threats were averted as a result of the efforts of the local community. A "Splash Park" (opened in 2005, closed in 2016) was a welcome addition to the village, having been developed on the site of the old Victorian paddling pool. The Splash Park retained some of the original paddling pool structures. The Splash Park was closed in 2016 and replaced with a new play area called Belvedere Beach; this opened on 27 July 2017.

Much of western Belvedere is taken up by Lesnes Abbey Woods, a 73-hectare ancient woodland, near to and named after the ruined Lesnes Abbey. This serves as one connection to areas such as Abbey Wood and contains some of the Green Chain Walk.

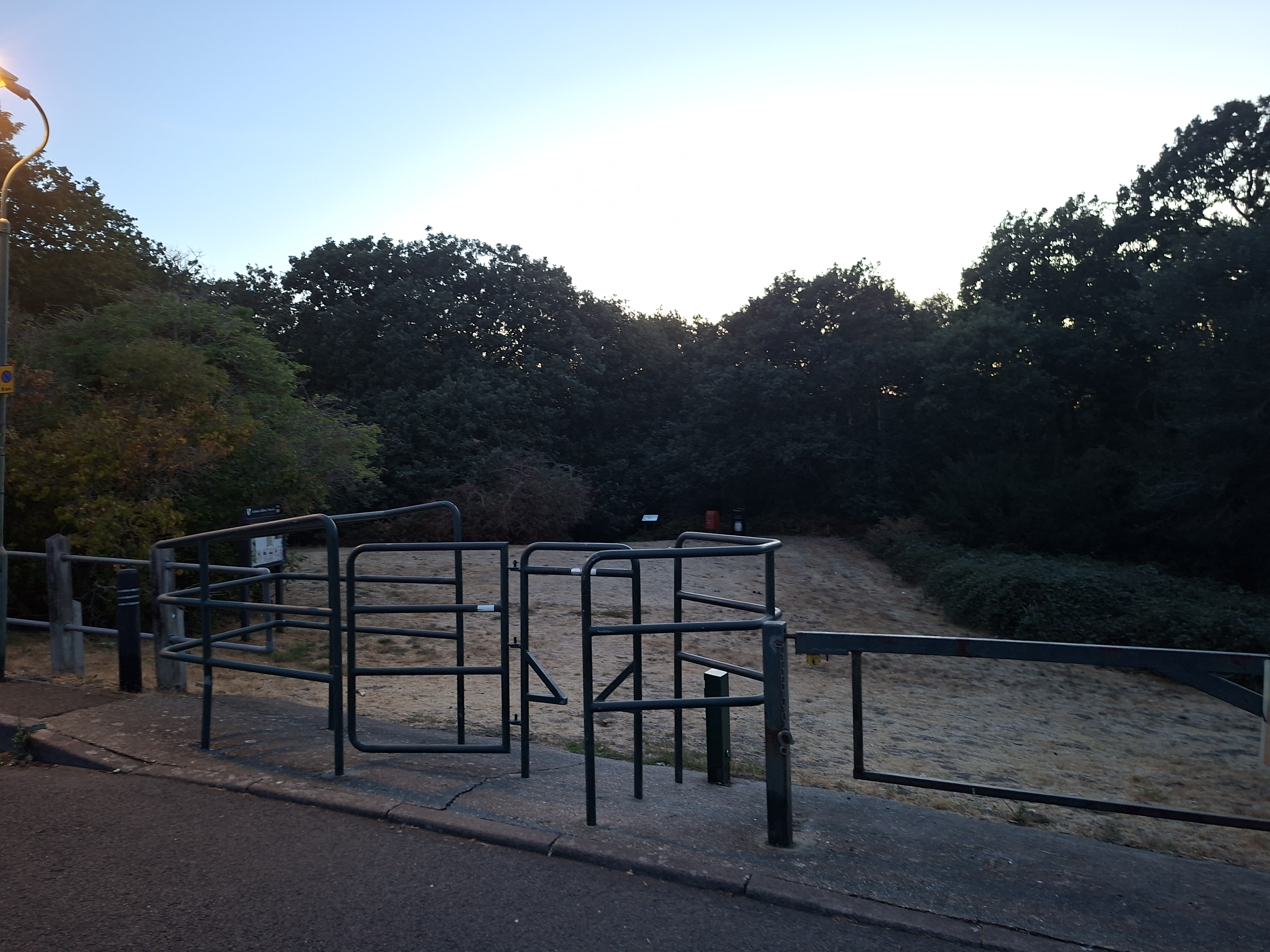
Entrance to Lesnes Abbey Woods as seen on Nelson Road

Lower Belvedere is smaller than Upper Belvedere, more industrial and closer to Belvedere railway station. It has a Methodist chapel and a Sikh Temple. To its north it borders Crossness, an area near the Thames containing a small industrial park, Belvedere Incinerator (a large waste-to-energy plant), and Crossness Sewage Treatment Works with its high technology sludge methane incinerator and Joseph Bazalgette's Victorian Crossness Pumping Station. Lower Belvedere is also the location of the Belvedere Community Forum, which runs and meets at Belvedere Community Centre.

The Grade II Listed Bexley College was designed in 1906 by W Egerton in the Queen Anne style and is on residential Erith Road on the last part of the ridge, in the east of the district on the border of Erith.

The Woolwich Road Conservation Area was designated in February 1992, by Bexley Council due to its special Victorian character and high concentration of historical buildings in a small area. The conservation area includes the Eardley Arms public house, Prince of Wales public house, DVLA Driving Test Centre (the original Belvedere Police Station built in the 1880s), Belvedere Recreation Grounds and the large residential villas and semi detached houses along Woolwich Road and Gloucester Road. These houses were for the wealthier Victorian families of the area, possibly for the professional classes or for the managers or owners of the businesses which located in Erith and Woolwich. The former Woolwich Road police station was built in 1881 at a cost of £3386 and designed to blend in with the adjacent houses. Belvedere at that time had a strength of two inspectors, three sergeants, and twenty six constables. It remained an active police station until 1968, when new much larger station was built on the corner of Nuxley Road and Woolwich Road. This remained open until its closure in 2015. In 2018 it was sold for redevelopment for a reported £1.25 million.

=== Places of worship ===
- All Saints Belvedere, Nuxley Road
- Free Grace Baptist Church, Nuxley Road, Belvedere
- Belvedere Congregational Church, Picardy Road
- Belvedere Baptist Church
- Belvedere Methodist Church
- St Augustine, Belvedere
- Ichthus Community Church, Belvedere
- Belvedere Pentecostal, Mitchell Close
- Guru Nanak Darbar, Sikh Temple, Mitchell Close

== Demography ==
As of the 2011 census, 65% of the population was White British, followed by 12% Black African.

== Politics ==
There are three councillors for the Belvedere Ward of Bexley London Borough Council. As of 2022 these were Daniel Francis (Labour), Sally Hinkley (Labour) and Esther Amaning (Labour). Belvedere lies within the Erith and Thamesmead constituency (MP Abena Oppong-Asare, Labour, as of 2022), and is in the London Assembly constituency of Bexley and Bromley, represented by Peter Fortune (Conservative) as of 2022.

== Sport ==
Erith and Belvedere Football Club recently moved to Welling in a ground-sharing arrangement. Belvedere Football Club and Belvedere Cricket Club play at Memorial Sports Ground, Woolwich Road, Abbey Wood and compete in the Kent County League Division One (West).

Bexleyheath and Belvedere Hockey Club are based in Welling, but play some home matches at Erith School.

== Transport ==
=== Rail ===
Belvedere railway station, opened in 1859, is in Lower Belvedere and is served by the North Kent Line which runs from London Cannon Street to Dartford/Gravesend/Gillingham (Kent). Belvedere also benefits from the Docklands Light Railway connection at nearby Woolwich, and the long-awaited Elizabeth line to neighbouring Abbey Wood which opened in 2022.

=== Buses ===
Belvedere is served by several Transport for London bus services connecting it with areas including Thamesmead, Erith, Bexleyheath, Woolwich and Sidcup.

=== Green Chain Walk ===
The Green Chain Walk is largely east–west route along the northern slopes of the ridge, stretching from Plumstead Common to Erith, it provides a shortcut to the Thames Path - to which it is linked in three locations.

=== Motoring ===
Driving test statistics from the Driver & Vehicle Standards Agency for the year 2013-14 showed that Belvedere test centre had the lowest pass rate in Great Britain. Between 2022 and 2023 Belvedere test centre had the second lowest pass rate in the country, with nearby Erith having the lowest pass rate in that period.

The proposed Belvedere Crossing across the River Thames would be either a bridge or tunnel between Belvedere and Rainham.

== Geography ==
Belvedere borders the River Thames to the north, Erith to the north east and east, Northumberland Heath to the south east and south, West Heath to the south west, Abbey Wood to the west and Thamesmead to the north west.

== Notable residents ==
- Alfred William Alcock (1859–1933) physician, naturalist, and carcinologist, died in Belvedere
- Billy Cornelius (1898–?), professional football player and manager, born in Belvedere
- Alec Debnam (1921–2003), cricketer, born in Belvedere
- Walter Donaldson (1907–1973), Scottish snooker player, lived for some years in Grosvenor Road
- Roy Dwight (1933–2002), footballer (Nottingham Forest), born in Belvedere
- Mike Kelly (born 1954), footballer (Millwall FC), born in Belvedere
- Alan Knott (born 1946), cricketer, born in Belvedere, attended Northumberland Heath Secondary Modern School
- Charlie Revell (1919–1999), footballer
- Colin Seeley (1936–2020), champion motorcyclist and motorbike designer, lived in Belvedere and worked on Nuxley Road
- Flaxman Charles John Spurrell (1842–1915), archaeologist, geologist and photographer, lived at The Priory, Picardy Road
- Anne Swithinbank (born 1957), horticulturist and gardening writer, born in Belvedere

== See also ==
- Belvedere Power Station

== Notes and references ==
Notes
