= Upper Belvedere and Lower Belvedere =

Upper Belvedere and Lower Belvedere may refer to:

- areas of Belvedere, London, England
- palaces that form the Belvedere, Vienna, Austria
