= St Paul's Academy, Abbey Wood =

St Paul's Academy

Location
- 53 Finchale Road; Abbey Wood, Greater London, SE2 9PX; England
- Coordinates: 51°29′33″N 0°06′15″E

Information
- Type: Academy
- Religious affiliation: Roman Catholic
- Established: 1968; 2005
- Department for Education URN: 105135 Tables
- Ofsted: Reports
- Chair: Bernie Borland
- Principal: Siobhan Malone
- Gender: Mixed
- Age: 11 to 16
- Enrolment: 1200 as of January 2021
- Website: http://www.stpaulsacademy.org.uk/

St Paul's Academy (formerly St Paul's Catholic School) is a mixed Roman Catholic secondary school located in southeast London, England.

== History ==
St Paul's Catholic Secondary School was established in a Victorian school board building on Wickham Lane, Abbey Wood, in 1968. The school was converted to academy status in 2005, sponsored by the Roman Catholic Archdiocese of Southwark. The school relocated to new buildings in 2010. Previously the school was under the control of Greenwich London Borough Council, and St Paul's continues to coordinate with Greenwich London Borough Council for admissions. 33% of school places are reserved for pupils from the local community, while remaining places are allocated to Roman Catholic pupils.

== Campus ==
The new campus is at the corner of Finchale Road and Church Manor Way, in the Abbey Wood area of the Royal Borough of Greenwich.

== Curriculum ==
St Paul's Academy offers GCSEs and BTECs as programmes of study for pupils. The school has specialisms in Sport and Business & Enterprise, and has additional resources for the specialisms.

== Extracurricular activities ==
The school runs Gaelic football teams in partnership with Dulwich Harps GFC.

== Awards and recognition ==
The school was awarded Beacon Status in 2005. In February 2013 St Paul's was rated as "Good" by Ofsted. In the summer of 2019 St Paul's Academy announced that 10% of their Year 11 GCSE students had earned a Grade 7 or above in 5 or more different subjects, an increase of 1.25% on the year prior.

== Notable former pupils ==
Lee Taylor - 2005–2010

Adam Merritt - 2005-2010
