= Alec Debnam =

English cricketer and member of the Royal Air Force

Personal information
- Full name: Alexander Frederick Henry Debnam
- Born: 12 October 1921; Belvedere, Kent, England
- Died: 26 January 2003 (aged 81); Newcastle, Northumberland, England
- Batting: Right-handed
- Bowling: Leg-break googly

Domestic team information
- Years: Team
- 1948–1949: Kent
- 1950–1951: Hampshire

Career statistics
Competition	First-class
Matches	21
Runs scored	327
Batting average	12.11
100s/50s	–/1
Top score	64
Balls bowled	1,506
Wickets	20
Bowling average	43.10
5 wickets in innings	1
10 wickets in match	–
Best bowling	5/87
Catches/stumpings	12/–
- Source: Cricinfo, 6 February 2010

Alexander Frederick Henry Debnam (12 October 1921 — 26 January 2003), known as Alec Debnam, was an English first-class cricketer and Royal Air Force officer.

Debnam was born in October 1921 at Belvedere, Kent. He served in the Second World War with the Royal Air Force Volunteer Reserve, holding the rank of flight sergeant in 1943. In June 1943, he was given an emergency commission as a pilot officer on probation; he was confirmed in the rank in December 1943, at which point he was made a war substantive flying officer. In July 1945, he was made a war substantive flight lieutenant. Following the war, he left the RAFVR to pursue a career as a cricketer. Having played for the Kent Second XI in 1947 and 1948, he made his debut in first-class cricket for Kent against Sussex at Tunbridge Wells in the 1948 County Championship. He played first-class cricket for Kent until 1949, making eleven appearances as a leg break googly bowler and understudy to Doug Wright. For Kent, he took 16 wickets at an average of 41.81; he took one five wicket haul (5 for 87) against Gloucestershire on a favourable bowling pitch at Bristol in 1948.

In 1950, he joined Hampshire, making his debut against Yorkshire at Portsmouth in the County Championship. Following a career-best score of 64 against Cambridge University at Bournemouth in 1951, Debnam was tried by Hampshire as an opening batsman for their following match against Yorkshire, though without success. His first-class career to an end following the 1951 season, with Debnam returning to the Royal Air Force (RAF). In eleven first-class matches for Hampshire, he scored 239 runs at an average of 15.93. With the ball, he took 4 wickets at an average of 48.25. In the RAF, he rejoined as a non-commissioned officer. In January 1952, he was recommissioned as a flying officer. He retired from active service in March 1964. Debnam died at Newcastle in January 2003, aged 81.
