= Abbey Wood SSSI =

Geological site in south-east London

Coordinates: 51.48706°N 0.12942°E

Abbey Wood
- Site of Special Scientific Interest
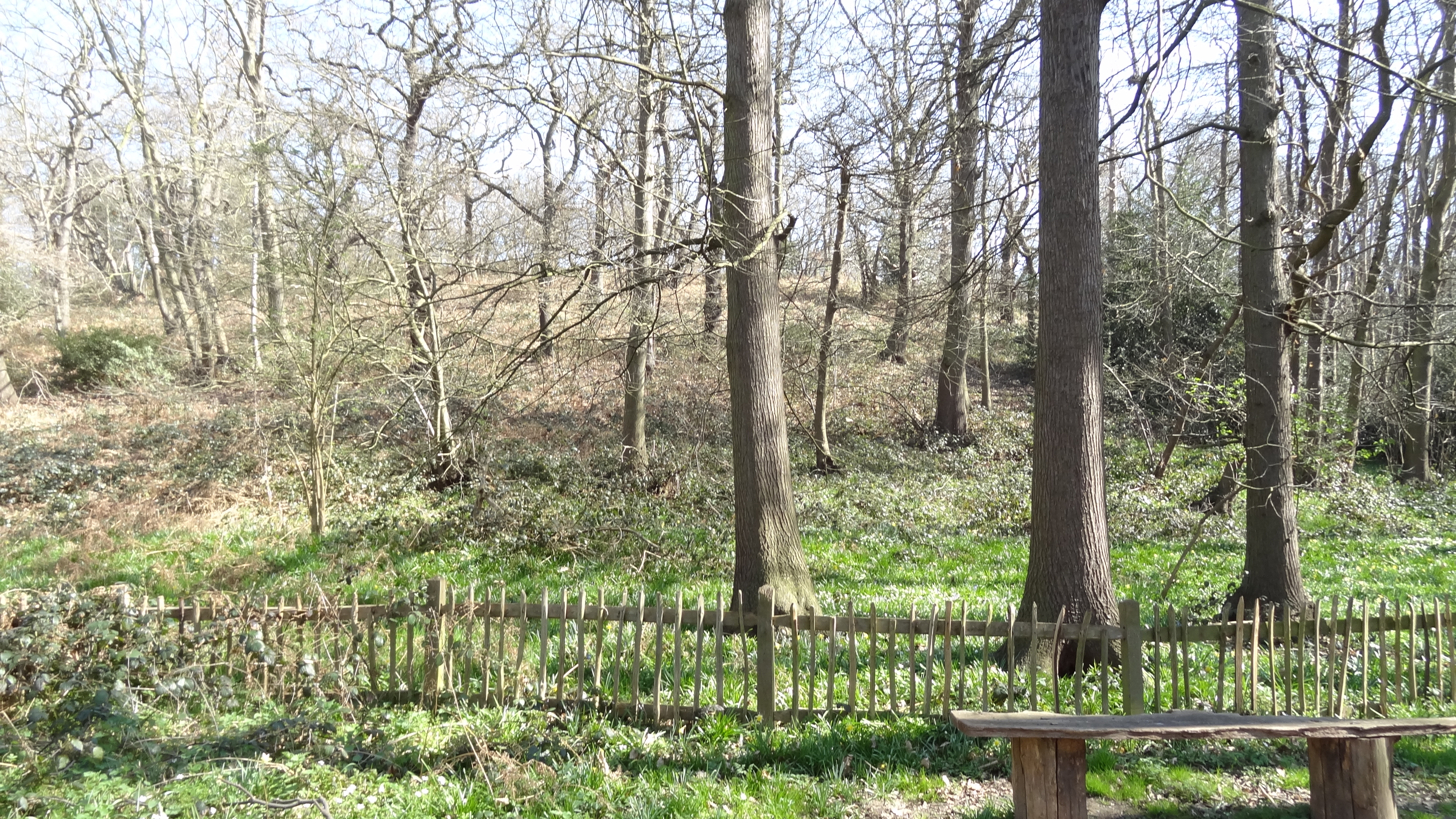
- Location of Abbey Wood.
- Area of search: Greater London
- Grid reference: TQ481786
- Interest: Geological
- Area: 6.3 ha (16 acres)
- Notification date: 1987
- Location map: Magic Map

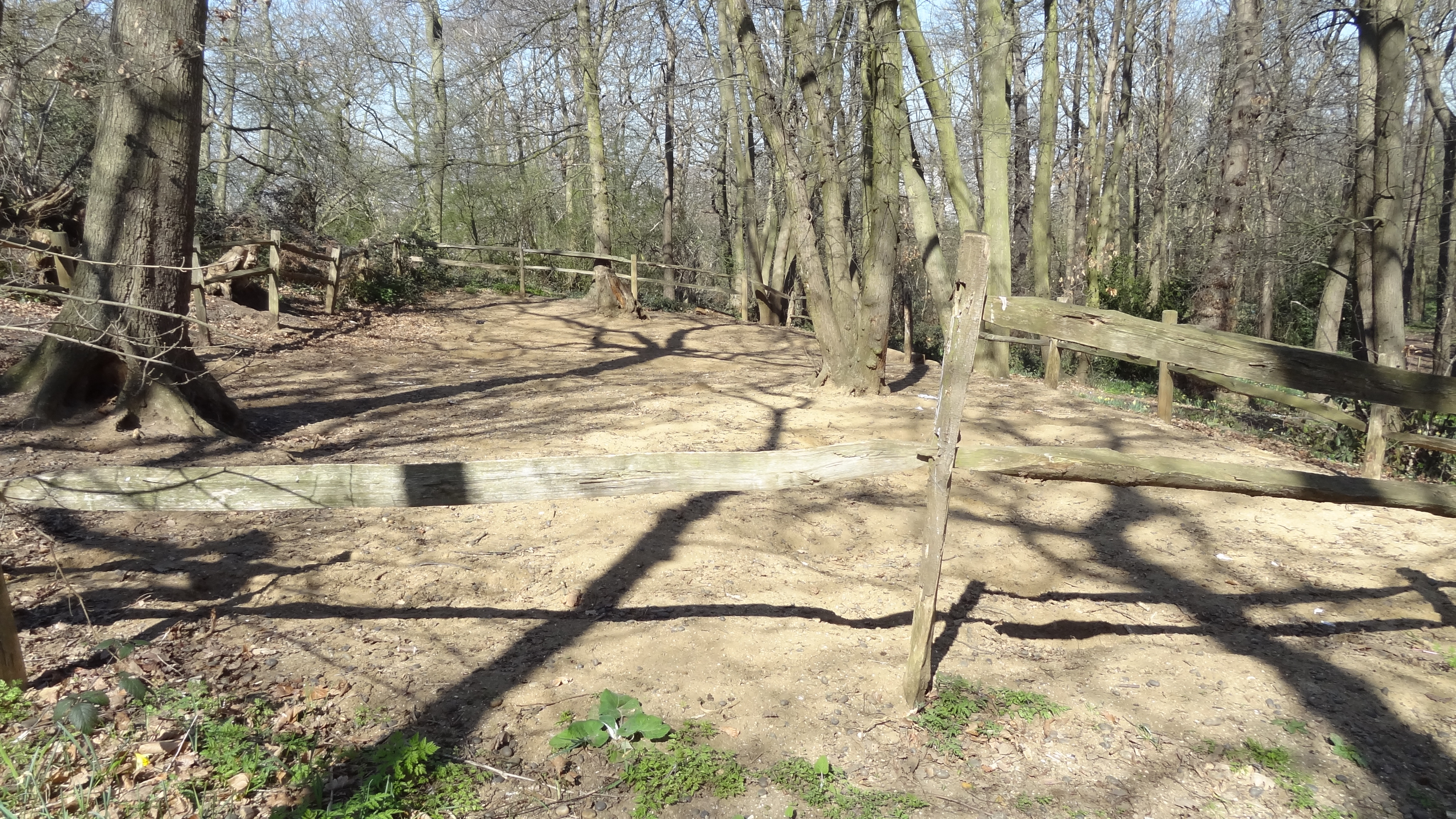
The Fossil Bed where members of the public are allowed to dig for fossils

Abbey Wood is a 6.3-hectare (16-acre) geological Site of Special Scientific Interest in Abbey Wood in the London Borough of Bexley. It is located in Lesnes Abbey Woods south-east of the ruins of Lesnes Abbey. Members of the public can dig for fossils in a small area designated as the Fossil Bed with the permission of the Lesnes Abbey ranger.

The site is late Palaeocene and early Eocene 50 to 60 million years ago. Important Palaeocene finds in the Blackheath Beds on the site include 22 species of mammals in 12 orders, which resemble the Wasatchian fauna of North America. It has also yielded one of only two Palaeocene birds found in Britain, the holotype of Marinavis longirostris, a large Procellariiform sea bird, and the site may throw light on Procellariiform/Pelecaniform evolution.

Excavations of the site in the twentieth century produced a rich yield of Eocene mammals and many shark teeth. It is particularly important for fish, including 16 type specimens. It has three entries in the Geological Conservation Review database, for Tertiary mammalia, Mesozoic and Tertiary fish and amphibians, and aves.

== Land ownership ==
All land within Abbey Wood SSSI is owned by the local authority

== See also ==
- List of Sites of Special Scientific Interest in Greater London
- Lesnes Abbey Woods
- Lesnes Abbey
- Abbey Wood
