= Mike Kelly (footballer, born 1954) =

English footballer

Personal information
- Full name: Michael Lawrence Kelly
- Date of birth: 22 October 1954 (age 72)
- Place of birth: Belvedere, Kent, England
- Position: Midfielder

Senior career*
Years	Team	Apps	(Gls)
1972–1974	Millwall	18	(2)
1974–1975	Charlton Athletic	10	(3)
1975–1976	Bexley United	4	(1)
1977–1978	Dartford	35	(0)
1978–1979	Carshalton Athletic		(3)
1979–1981	Cray Wanderers	86	(33)
1981	Sheppey United		
- * Club domestic league appearances and goals

Michael Lawrence Kelly (born 22 October 1954) is an English former professional footballer who played in the Football League as a midfielder.

He later played for Cray Wanderers, earning a Kent League winners' medal in 1980–81.
