= Lesnes Abbey =

Former abbey in Abbey Wood, London, England

Coordinates: 51°29′19″N 0°7′44″E

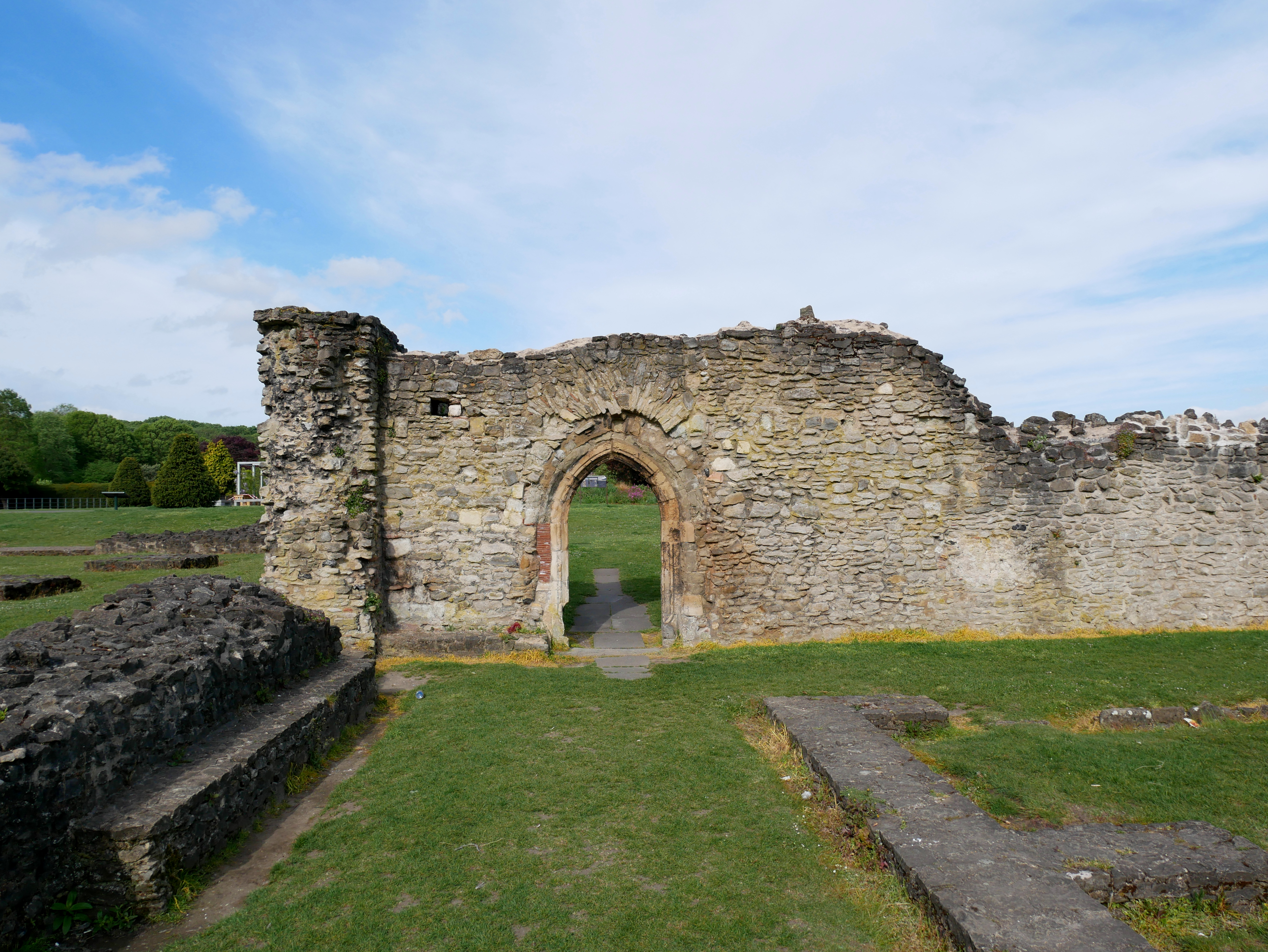
- The western side of the courtyard at Lesnes Abbey
- Interactive map of Lesnes Abbey

Monastery information
- Order: Augustinian
- Established: 1178
- Disestablished: 1525
- Mother house: Arrouaise Abbey
- Dedication: St Mary and St Thomas the Martyr

People
- Founder: Richard de Luci

Architecture
- Status: Ruins

Site
- Location: Abbey Wood, London
- Country: England

Lesnes Abbey /ˈlɛsnɪs/ is a former abbey, now ruined, in Abbey Wood, in the London Borough of Bexley, south-east London, England. It is a scheduled monument, and the abbey's ruins are listed at Grade II by Historic England.

The adjacent Lesnes Abbey Woods are a Local Nature Reserve. Part of the wood is the Abbey Wood SSSI, a geological Site of Special Scientific Interest which is an important site for fossils of the early Tertiary period.

== History ==
After the Norman Conquest in 1066, the area of Lesnes, close to the town of Erith, passed into the possession of Bishop Odo, and was mentioned in the Domesday Book of 1086 as Loisnes in the Hundred of Litlelai. The year 1178 saw the foundation of the Abbey of St Mary and St Thomas the Martyr at Lesnes, on a site now located in the suburbs of southeast London to the north of the ancient but long-managed Lesnes Abbey Woods that are named after it, where the land rises above what would originally have been marshland. It was the home for a small group of canons regular related to the Arroussian Order, a more relaxed version of the Augustinian canons, and subject to many reports over the years of religious, moral and administrative irregularities.

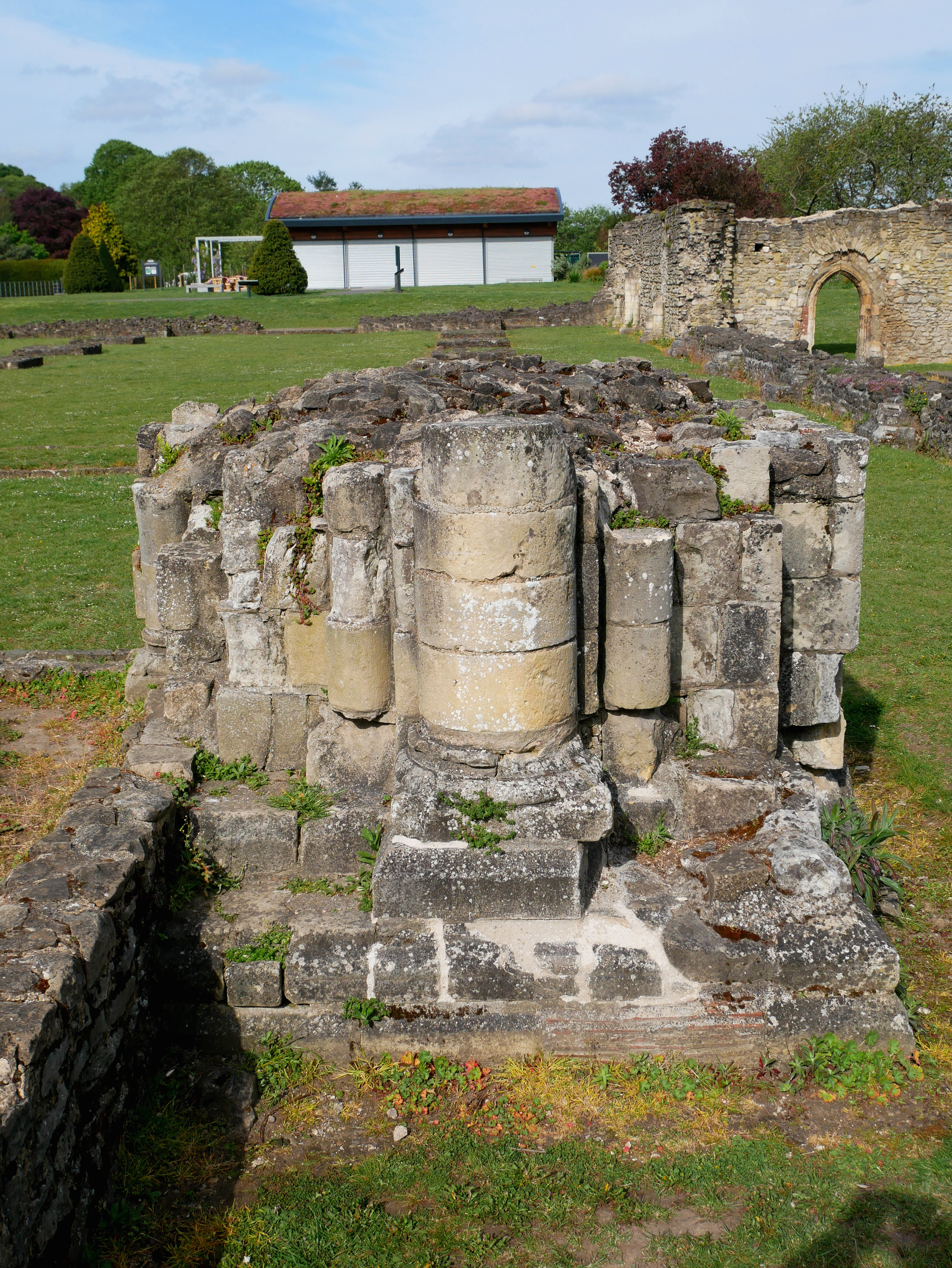
Base of a column flanking the nave of the church in Lesnes Abbey

Lesnes Abbey, as it is now known, was founded by Richard de Luci, Chief Justiciar of England, in 1178. This may have been in penance for his role in the protracted conflict between Henry II and Thomas Becket, the Archbishop of Canterbury, which culminated in the latter's murder in 1170 by four of the king's knights. In 1179, de Luci resigned his office and retired to the abbey, where he died three months later. He was buried in the chapter house on 14 July 1179. Produced for the Abbey between 1200 and 1220 in Oxford and Kent and now in the Victoria & Albert Museum in South Kensington, London, the 'Lesnes Missal' was possibly commissioned by him or a family member as it features references to the de Luci coat of arms.

In 1381 Abel Ker of Erith led a local uprising during the Peasants' Revolt, a rebellion which initially broke out in the neighbouring county of Essex. A group from Erith forced their way into nearby Lesnes Abbey and made the abbot (an important local landlord) to swear an oath to support them. They subsequently marched to Maidstone to join the main body of men led by Wat Tyler. Abbots also took a leading part in draining the marshland, but this and the cost of maintaining river embankments led to the Abbey suffering chronic financial difficulties.

The Abbey never became a large community and was closed by Cardinal Wolsey in 1525, under a licence to suppress monasteries of less than seven inmates. The canonry buildings were all demolished except for the Abbott's Lodging. Henry Cooke acquired the site in 1541 and it eventually passed to Sir John Hippersley who salvaged building materials, before selling the property to Thomas Hawes of London in 1632. It was then bequeathed to Christ's Hospital in 1633. Some of the stone is said to have been used in the construction of Hall Place in nearby Bexley.

The abbey was effectively lost and the area became farmland, with the abbot's house forming part of a farmhouse. In the late 18th or early 19th century a mulberry tree (Morus nigra) was planted on what had been the Abbey's north side – this still stands and is now externally propped.

The site was excavated by Woolwich & District Antiquarian Society in about 1909 to 1910. Archaeological finds from the Abbey's site are held by the Royal Greenwich Heritage Trust, with some on display in Erith Library. The former London County Council purchased the site of the ruins in 1930, which were opened to the public as a park in 1931. Since 1986, the site has been the property of the London Borough of Bexley. A branch of the Green Chain Walk passes the ruins on its way from Oxleas Wood to Thamesmead riverside. In modern times the site has been restored to show some of the walls and the entire outline of the abbey is visible giving a good idea of the size and atmosphere of the original place. The ruins remain surrounded by parkland and an ornamental garden. There are also a café, a small exhibition of the abbey and toilet facilities for visitors.

== Lesnes Abbey ward ==
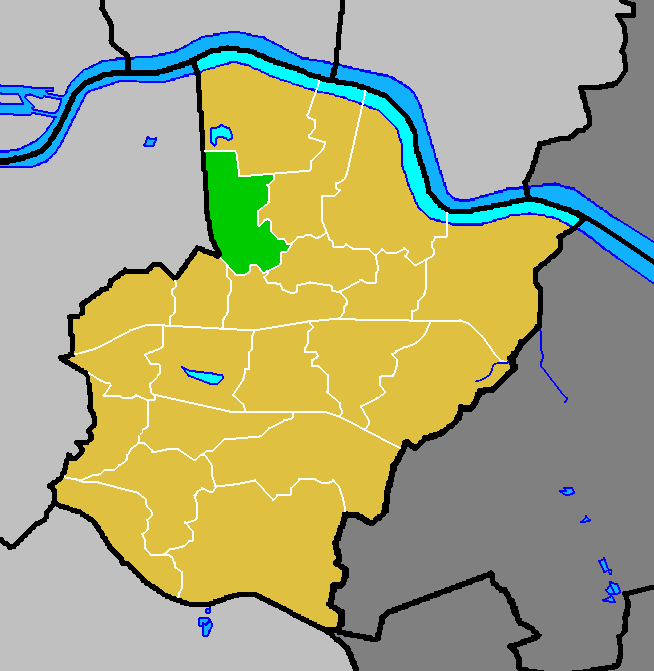
Lesnes Abbey ward (green) within the London Borough of Bexley (yellow).

Lesnes Abbey gives its name to one of the London Borough of Bexley's 21 electoral wards. The ruins themselves are in the north of Lesnes Abbey ward. Woolwich Road, the A206 road, cuts through the middle of the ward spanning east to west; the A2041 road spans north to south marking the ward's western boundary. West Heath is located within the ward to the south of Woolwich road. Lesnes Abbey ward is 2.5 km (1.6 mi) long north to south at its longest point, and little under 1.5 km (0.93 mi) at its widest point east to east. The population of the ward at the 2011 census was 11,346.

== Gallery ==
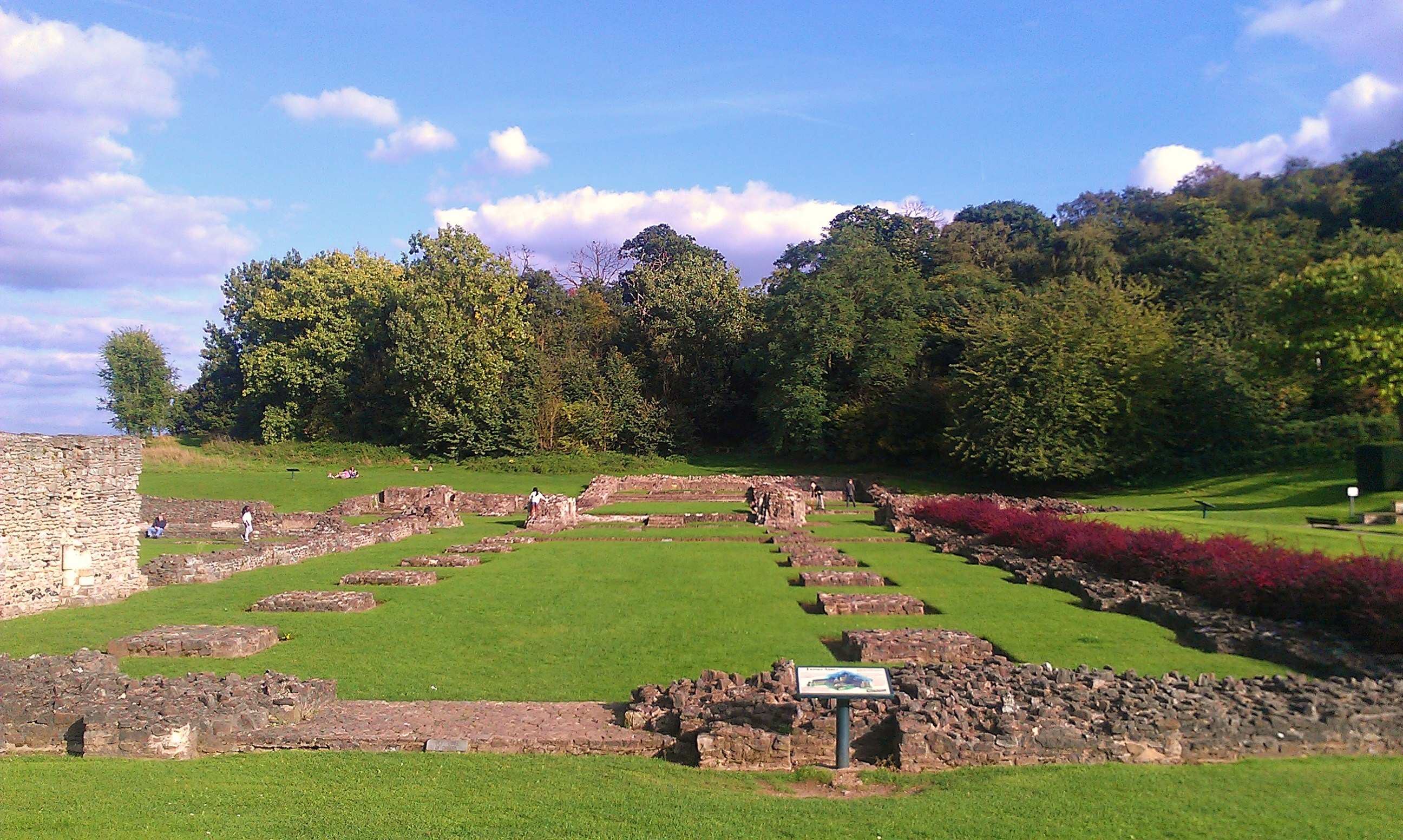
The nave of the Abbey

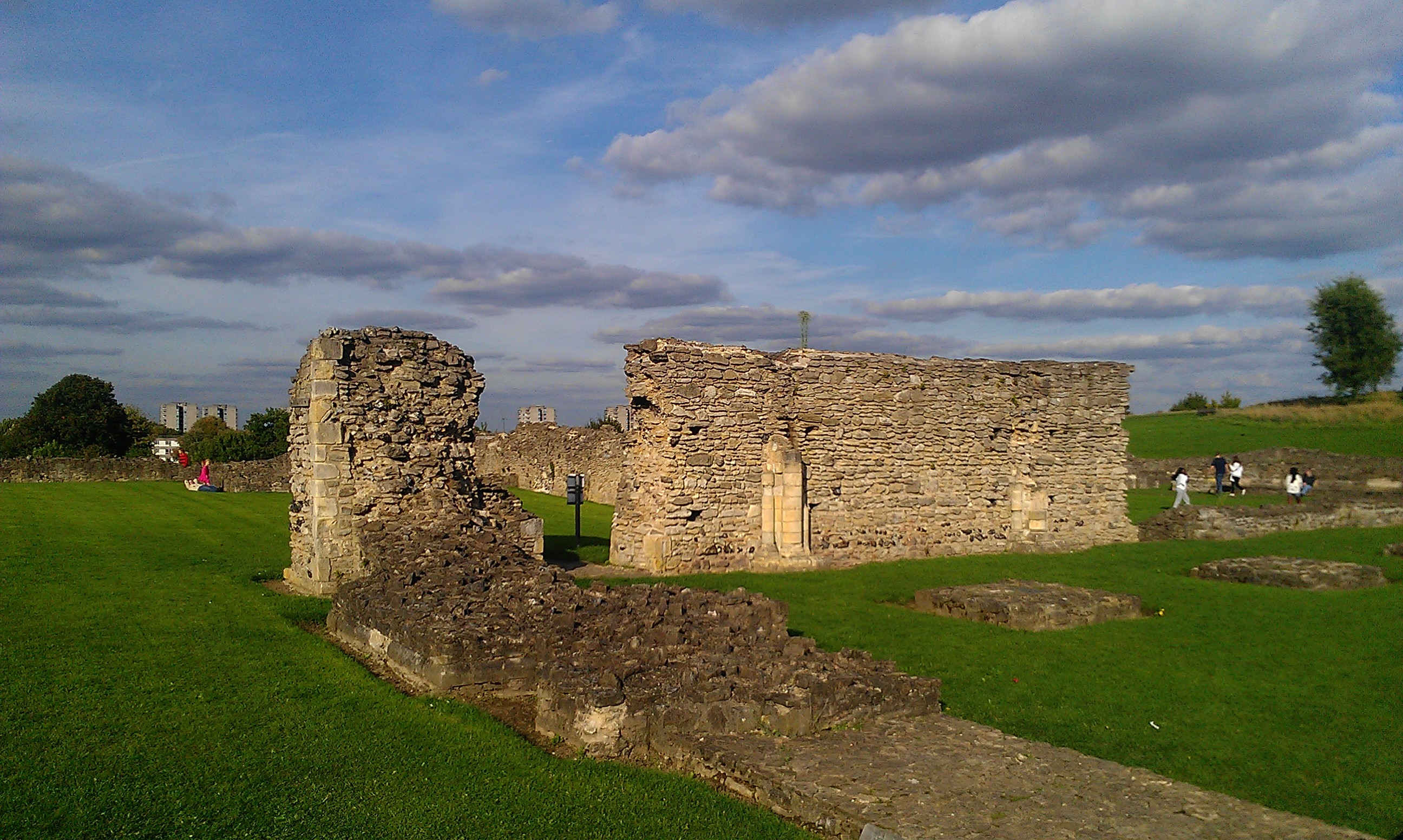
The Abbey

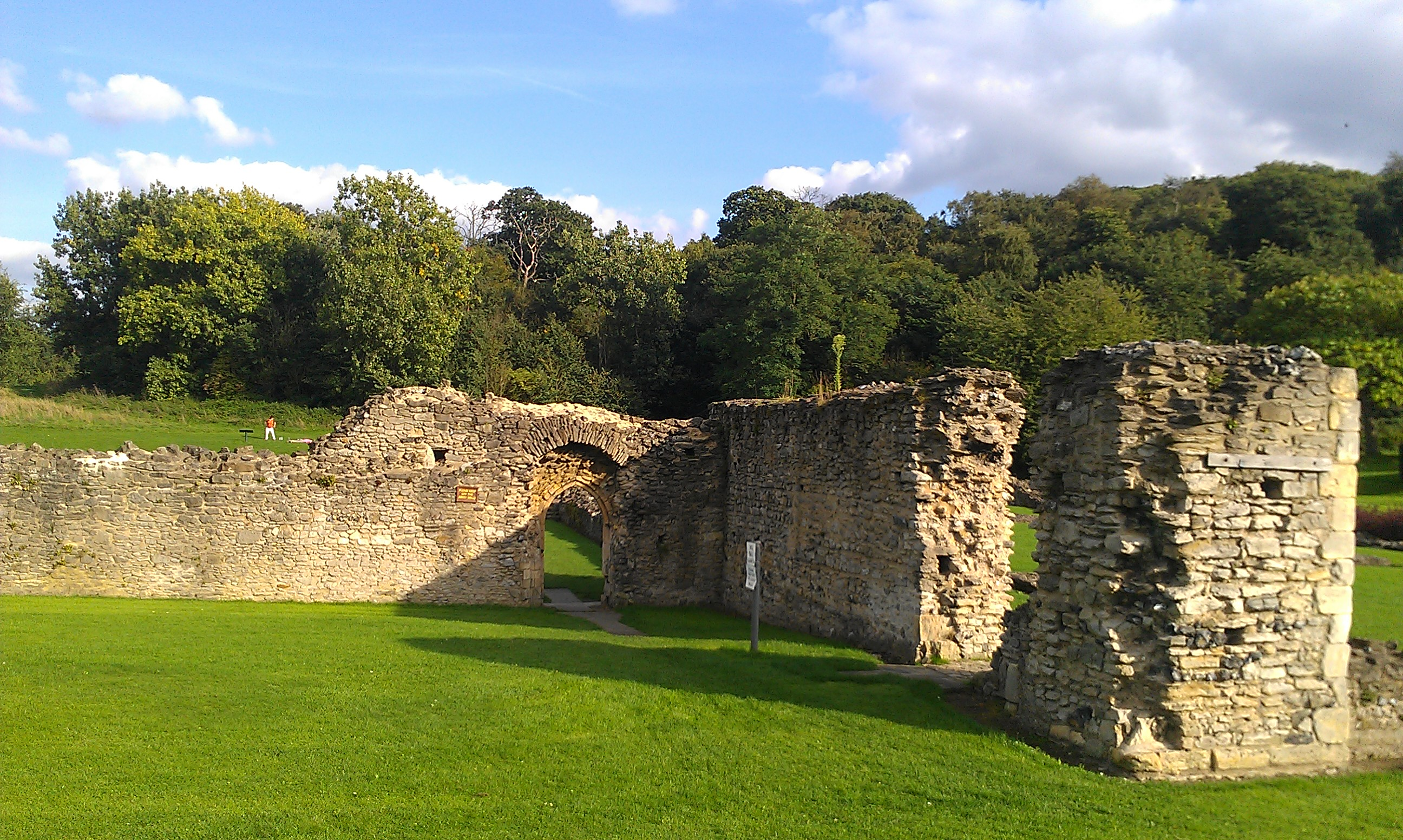
The north-west view of the Abbey

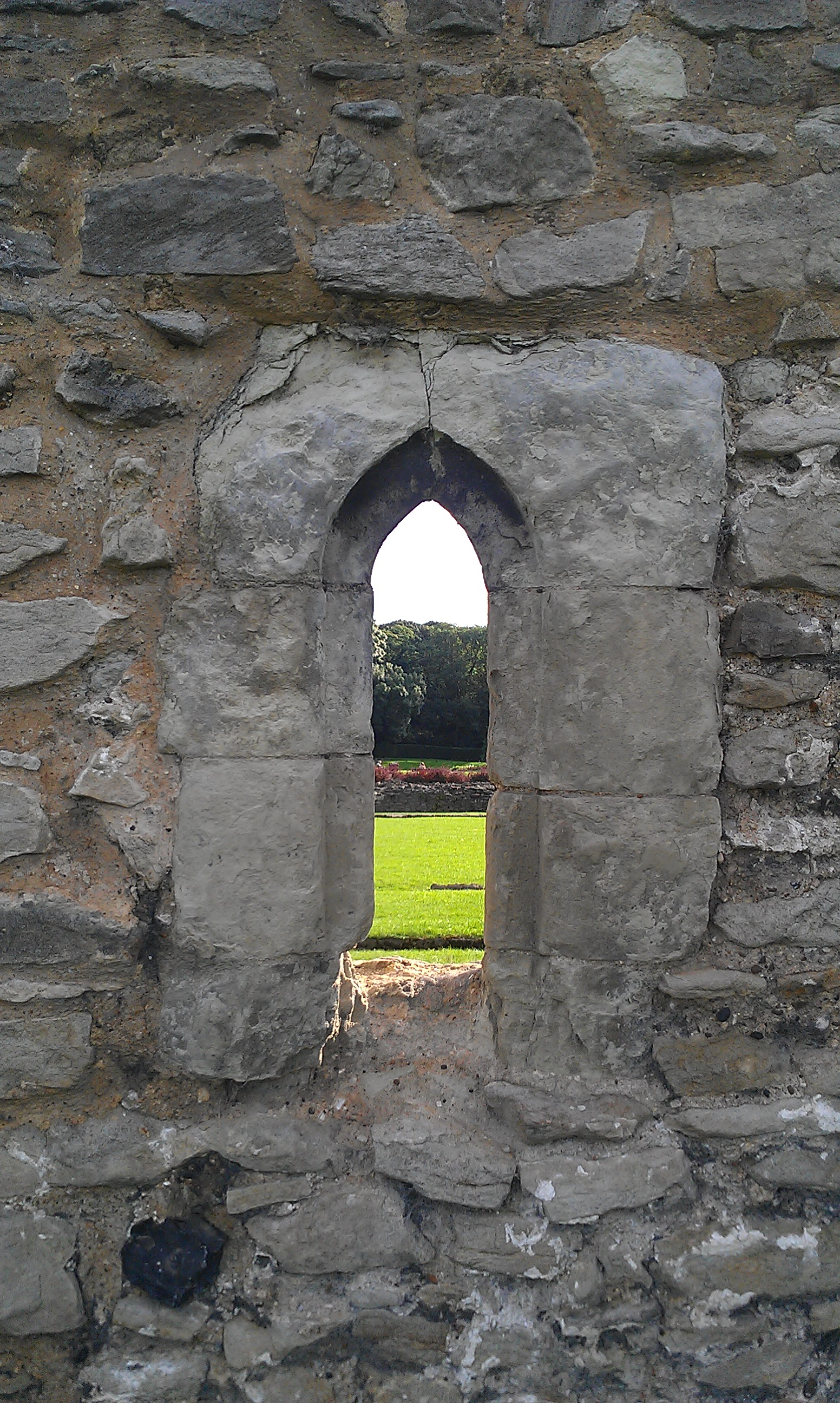
Window at Lesnes Abbey, looking from north to south

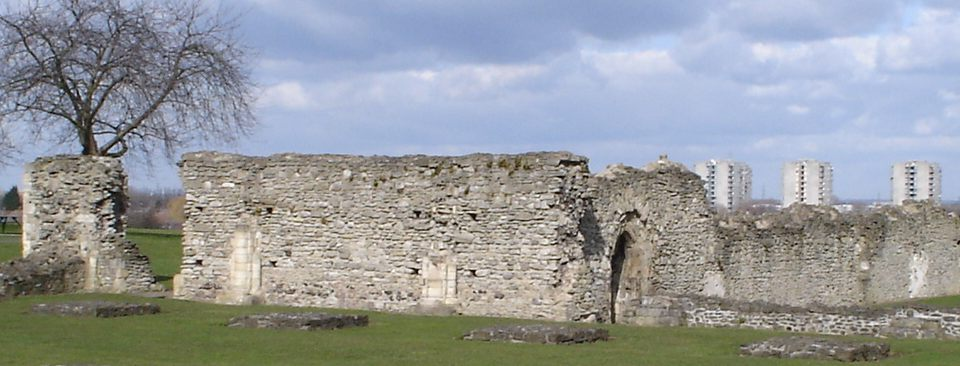
The ruins of Lesnes Abbey

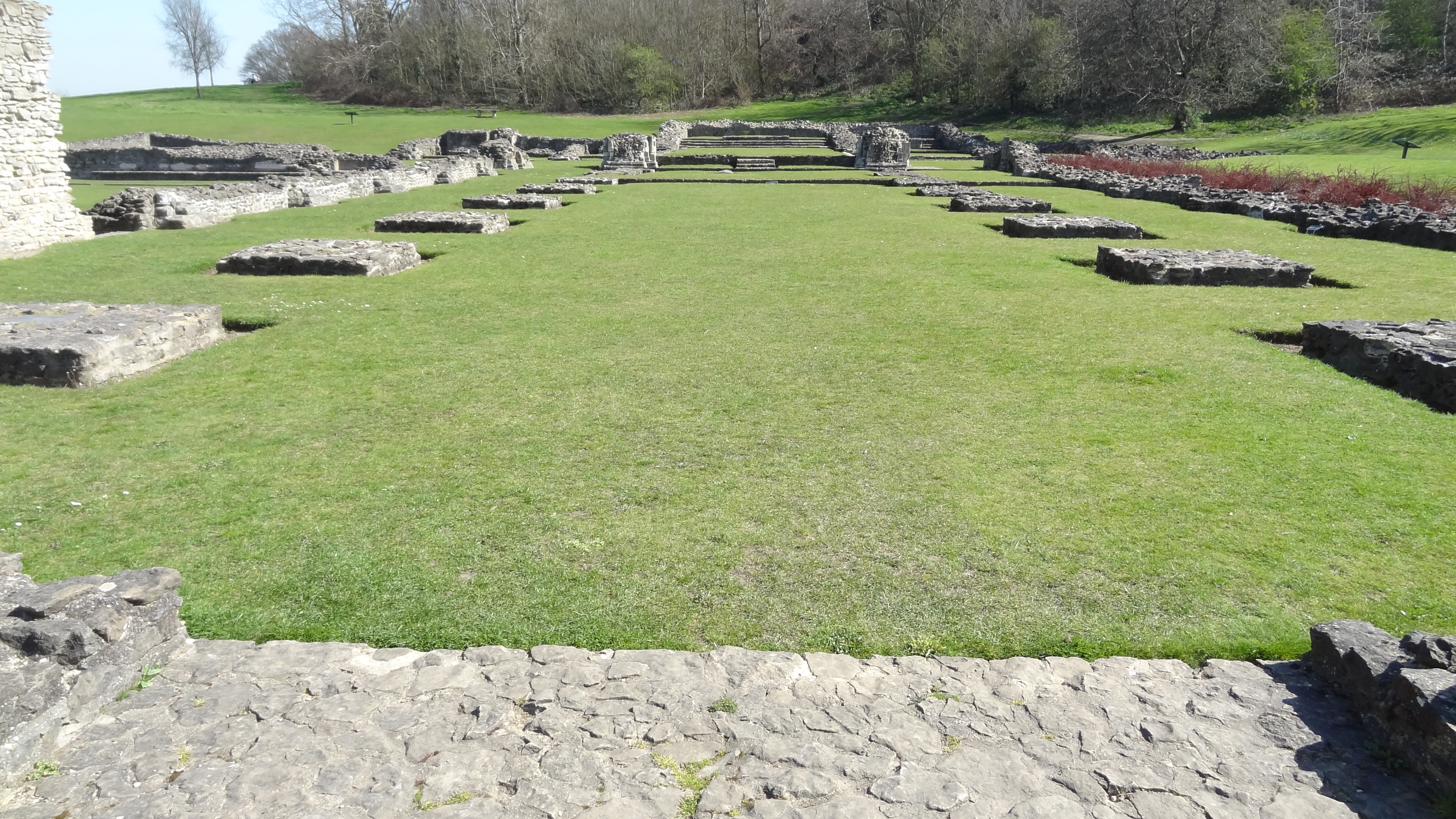
View of Lesnes Abbey church from the west end

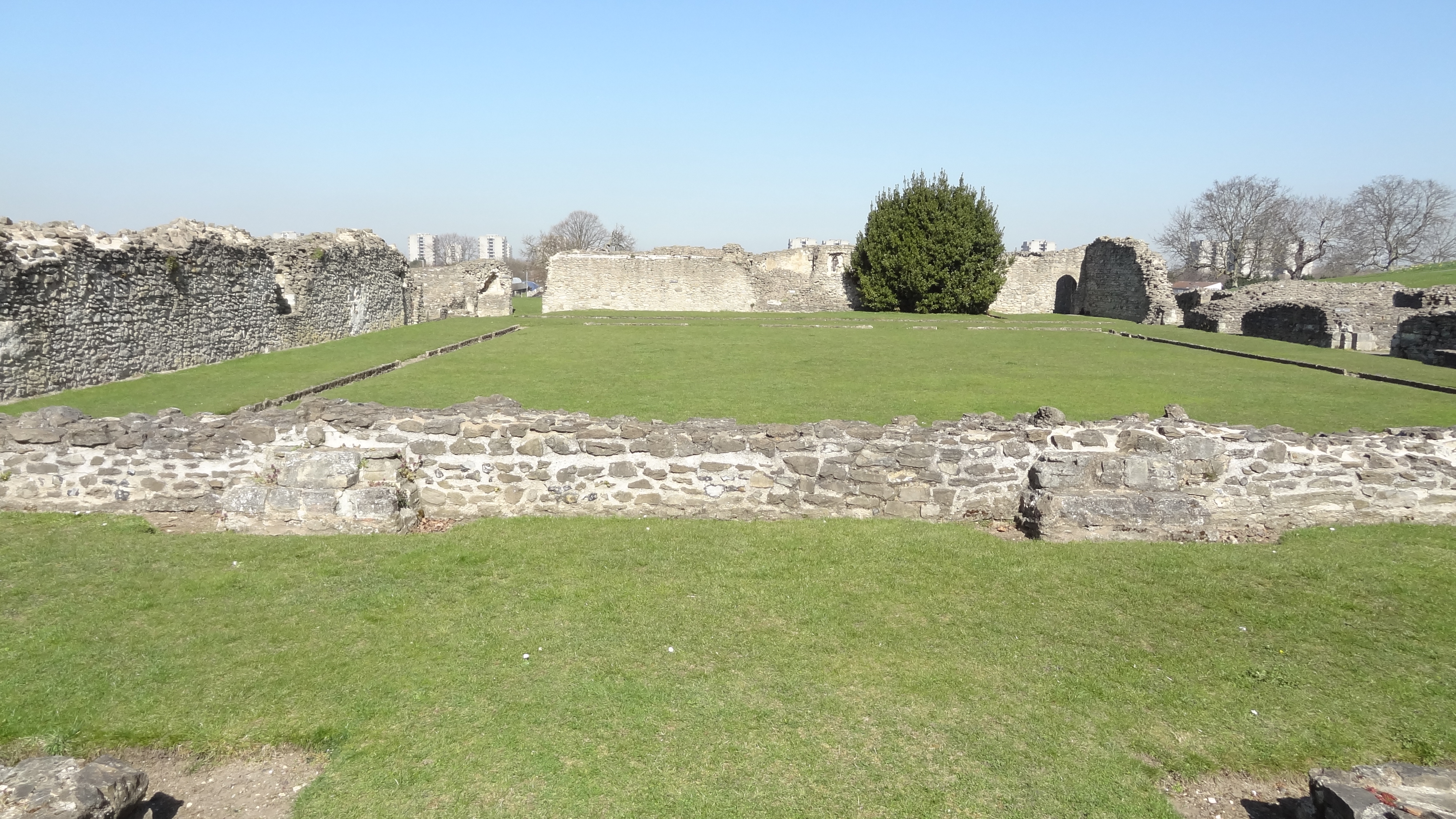
Courtyard and cloisters

== See also ==
- Lesnes Abbey Woods
- Lessness Heath
