= Abbey Wood =

Neighbourhood of London, England

Coordinates: 51.4864°N 0.1109°E

- Suburb
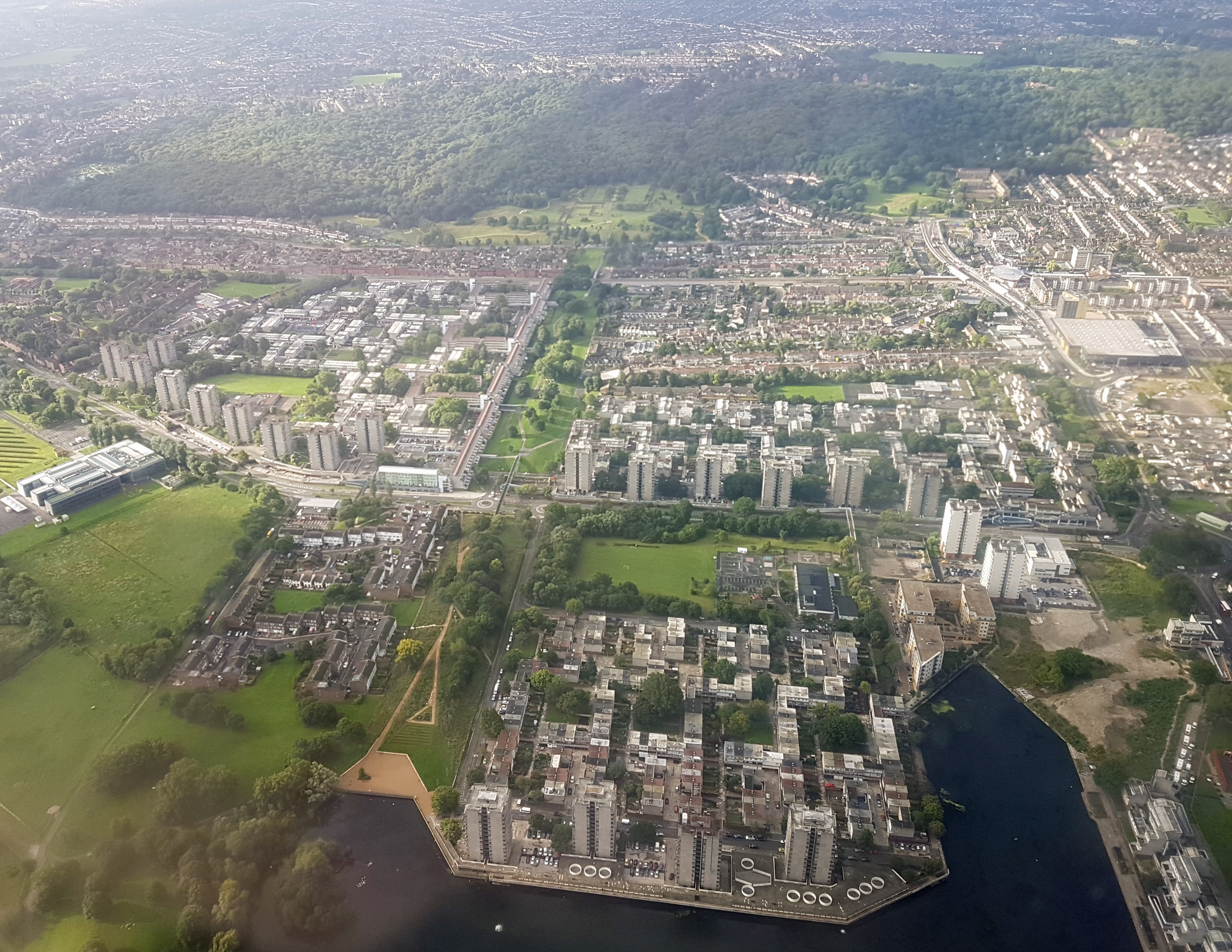
- Aerial view of Abbey Wood between Thamesmead (foreground) and Lesnes Abbey Woods. To the right Abbey Wood railway station

- Location within Greater London
- Population: 17,700 (2021 census)
- OS grid reference: TQ465785
  - Charing Cross: 10.6 mi (17.1 km) W
- London borough: Greenwich; Bexley
- Ceremonial county: Greater London
- Region: London
- Country: England
- Sovereign state: United Kingdom
- Post town: LONDON
- Postcode district: SE2
- Dialling code: 020
- Police: Metropolitan
- Fire: London
- Ambulance: London
- UK Parliament: Erith and Thamesmead
- London Assembly: Greenwich and Lewisham; Bexley and Bromley

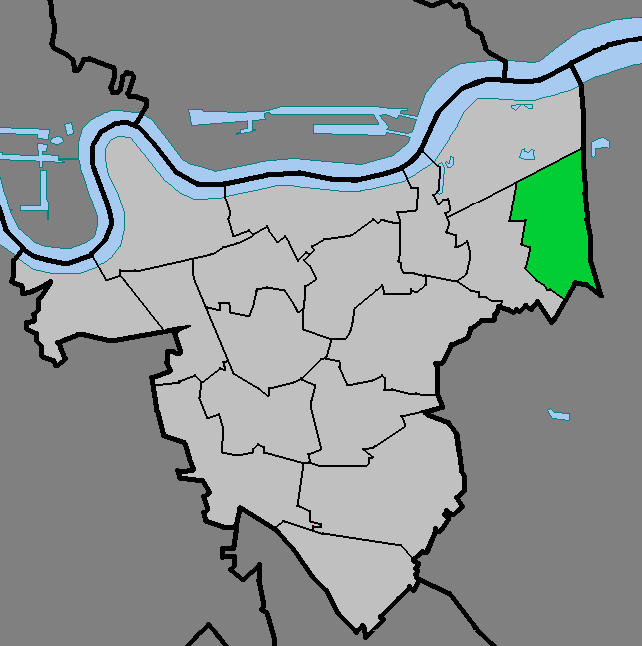
The ward of Abbey Wood (green) within Royal Borough of Greenwich (light grey)

Abbey Wood is an area in southeast London, England, in the Royal Borough of Greenwich and bordering the London Borough of Bexley. It is located 10.6 miles (17 km) east of Charing Cross. According to the 2021 census, Abbey Wood has a population of 17,700 (rounded to the nearest 100).

== Toponymy ==
The area takes its name from Lesnes Abbey Woods, located to the east, which once belonged to the monks of Lesnes Abbey.

== Development ==
=== Lesnes Abbey ===
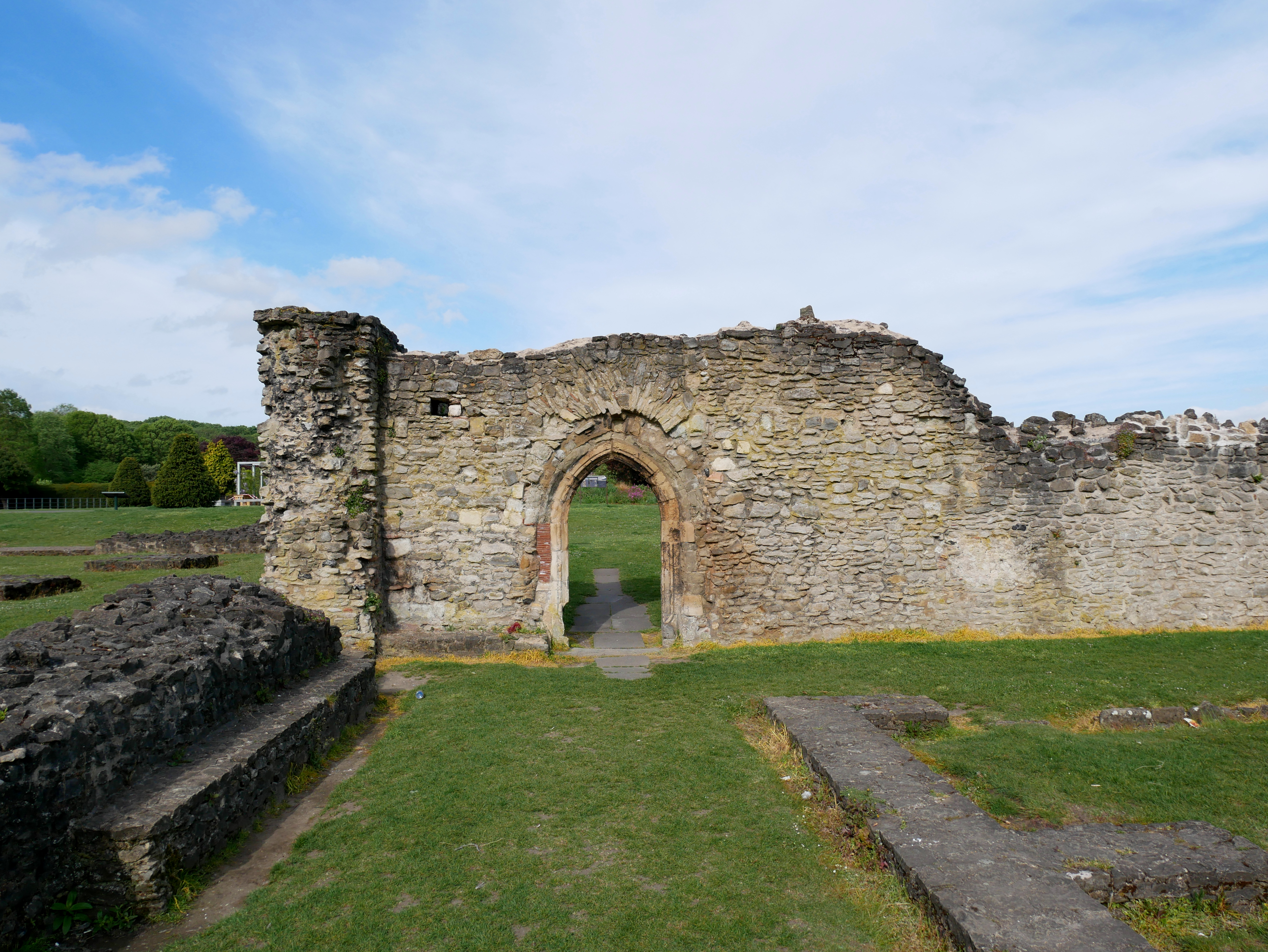
Abbey Wood is named after the ruined Lesnes Abbey, on high ground south of the town

The Abbey of St Mary and St Thomas the Martyr at Lesnes (or Lesnes Abbey) was founded in 1178 by Richard de Luci, Chief Justiciar of England. The Abbot of Lesnes Abbey was an important local landlord, and took a leading part in draining the marshland. However, this and the cost of maintaining river embankments was one of the reasons given for the Abbey's chronic financial difficulties. It never became a large community, and was closed by Cardinal Wolsey in 1525, under a licence to suppress monasteries of fewer than seven inmates. It was one of the first monasteries to be closed after the Dissolution of the Monasteries in 1524, and the monastic buildings were all pulled down, except for the Abbot's Lodging. Henry Cooke acquired the site in 1541 and it eventually passed to Sir John Hippersley who salvaged building materials, before selling the property to Thomas Hawes of London in 1632. It was then bequeathed to Christ's Hospital in 1633.

=== Railway Station ===
Abbey Wood railway station was opened in 1849, immediately to the north of the area now known as "The Village", built where Knee Hill became Harrow Manorway. Contemporary maps show Knee Hill as a minor track compared with a more major pathway through the centre of the existing woods. The Village consisted of a dozen or so cottages, and two pubs, the Abbey Arms (next to the railway station) and the Harrow Inn (demolished in 2009). The Harrow Inn which was located on the Kent side of Abbey Wood was the place where live bands would play in their hall; it was also the scene of a nightly migration as drinkers would relocate to the Abbey Arms each night, as Kentish closing times used to be 10.30pm whilst the Abbey Arms, which was in London, closed at 11 o'clock.

Abbey Wood was suggested as a site for a cemetery serving east London at a time of burial crisis in the capital. When the station was new, Edwin Chadwick proposed the closure of all existing burial grounds in the vicinity of London other than the privately owned Kensal Green Cemetery northwest of the city, which was to be nationalised and greatly enlarged to provide a single burial ground for west London, while a large tract of land on the Thames around 9 miles (14 km) southeast of London in Abbey Wood was to become a single burial ground for east London. The Treasury was sceptical that Chadwick's scheme would ever be financially viable, and it was widely unpopular. Although the Metropolitan Interments Act 1850 (13 & 14 Vict. c. 52) authorised the scheme, it was abandoned in 1852.

=== The Co-op Estate ===
The Royal Arsenal Co-operative Society (RACS) owned two farms on the hillside to the south of The Village; between 1900 and 1930, the RACS built the Bostall Estate, designed by architect Frank Bethell. Once known as "Tin Check Island" after the Society's dividend system, and known locally as "The Co-op Estate", this has streets named after Co-operative themes (Alexander McLeod, the first secretary of the RACS, Rochdale, Robert Owen, Congress), a school and shops but, like much social housing of the period, no public houses. The housing is largely traditional of the "two-up, two-down" design, in distinctive yellow London brick, with gardens to the front and rear. A description of the innovative construction processes used to construct the houses 'in a thoroughly substantial manor' is detailed here, which included digging a chalk mine locally for plaster. This mine was subsequently used as a bomb shelter in World War I.

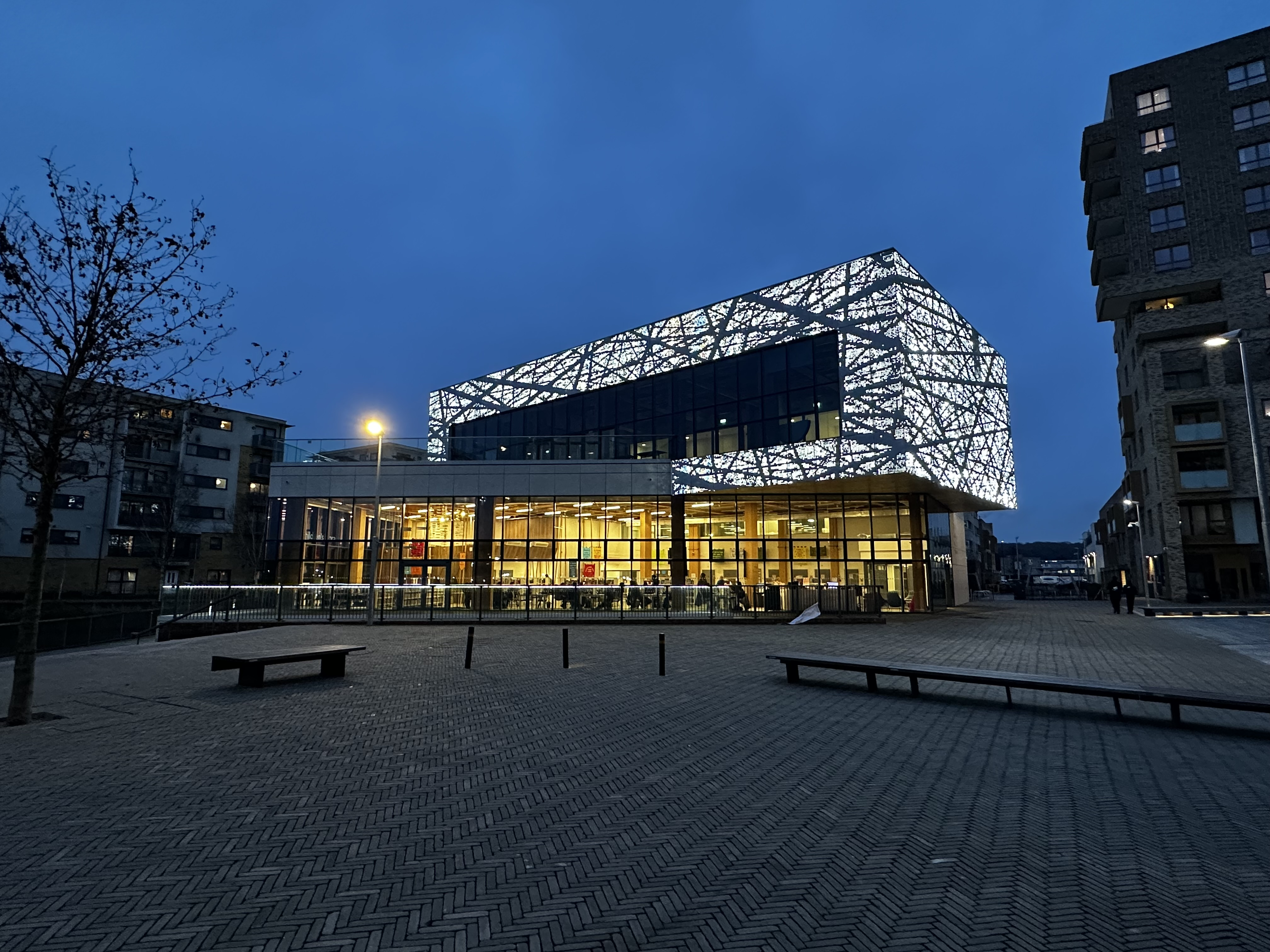
Entrance to Thamesmead Library from Cygnet Square at Dusk

Between 1955 and 1959, the London County Council built the Abbey Estate starting with one road south of the railway and later extending on the northern side on former Royal Arsenal marshland. Predominantly conventional brick houses with gardens, at first there were no shops or pubs, later equipped with a few shops and pubs together with schools and open spaces were added. Transport was non-existent at first until one bus, the route 180 was added after the building of Eynsham bridge. The estate was first used to rehouse people from Dockhead and Peckham then London's East End. The main through-road is Eynsham Drive.

=== Thamesmead ===
In the mid-1960s, the Greater London Council (GLC) began building the first phase of Thamesmead on more ex-Royal Arsenal land, north-east of Abbey Wood station. When it was initially developed, Thamesmead was envisioned as a revolutionary 'city within a city' of 60,000 people, providing much needed affordable homes with suitable amenities, surrounded by a lake and landscaped parkland exploiting its riverside position. It was designed in keeping with the emerging 'Brutalist' aesthetic. Despite being the culmination of the GLC's housing works, ultimately only stages 1 and 2 were completed, and the master plan was only partially realised.

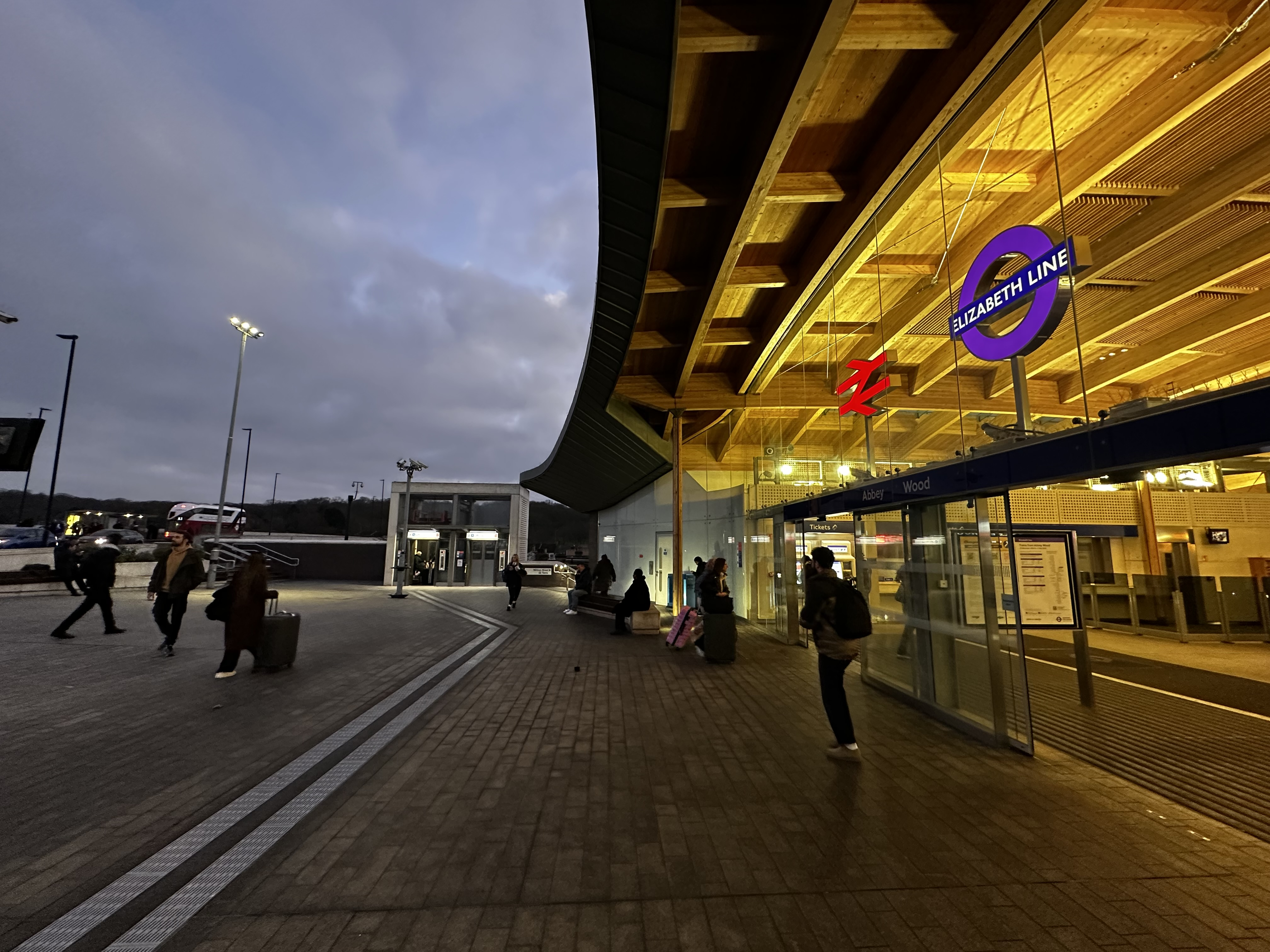
Entrance to Elizabeth Line Station at dusk

=== Elizabeth Line ===
Abbey Wood station is the south east terminus for the Elizabeth line, which opened in 2022, with direct travel times of 11 minutes to Canary Wharf and 25 minutes to Bond Street. The distinctive new station has transformed the area, resolving complex urban design issues and delivering a seamless multi modal interchange. A decade after work began on the line, Abbey Wood has seen the strongest price growth across London, at 107% over ten years. Property prices have more than doubled over the past decade in the local areas around Abbey Wood station, with Abbey Wood seen as a 'buyer competition hotspot', with a +869% increase in buyer competition compared to ten years ago.

=== Regeneration ===
There are currently major regeneration and development projects underway in that area of Abbey Wood and Thamesmead, which the Mayor of London has designated an 'Opportunity Area'. Thamesmead is currently undergoing an extensive regeneration project by Britain's oldest housing association Peabody, which promises up to 20,000 new homes, and improved community facilities.

== Demographics ==
According to the 2021 census, Abbey Wood has a population of 17,700. 35.4% of residents are aged 0–24, above the borough average of 31.3%. The largest ethnic group is White, making up 46.3% of the population, below the borough average of 55.7%, with the second largest being Black/Black British being 33.1% of the population, above the borough average of 21.0%. The largest religious group in Abbey Wood is Christianity, making up 51.7% of the population, with the second largest being No religion, with 24.5% of the population.

== Places of interest ==
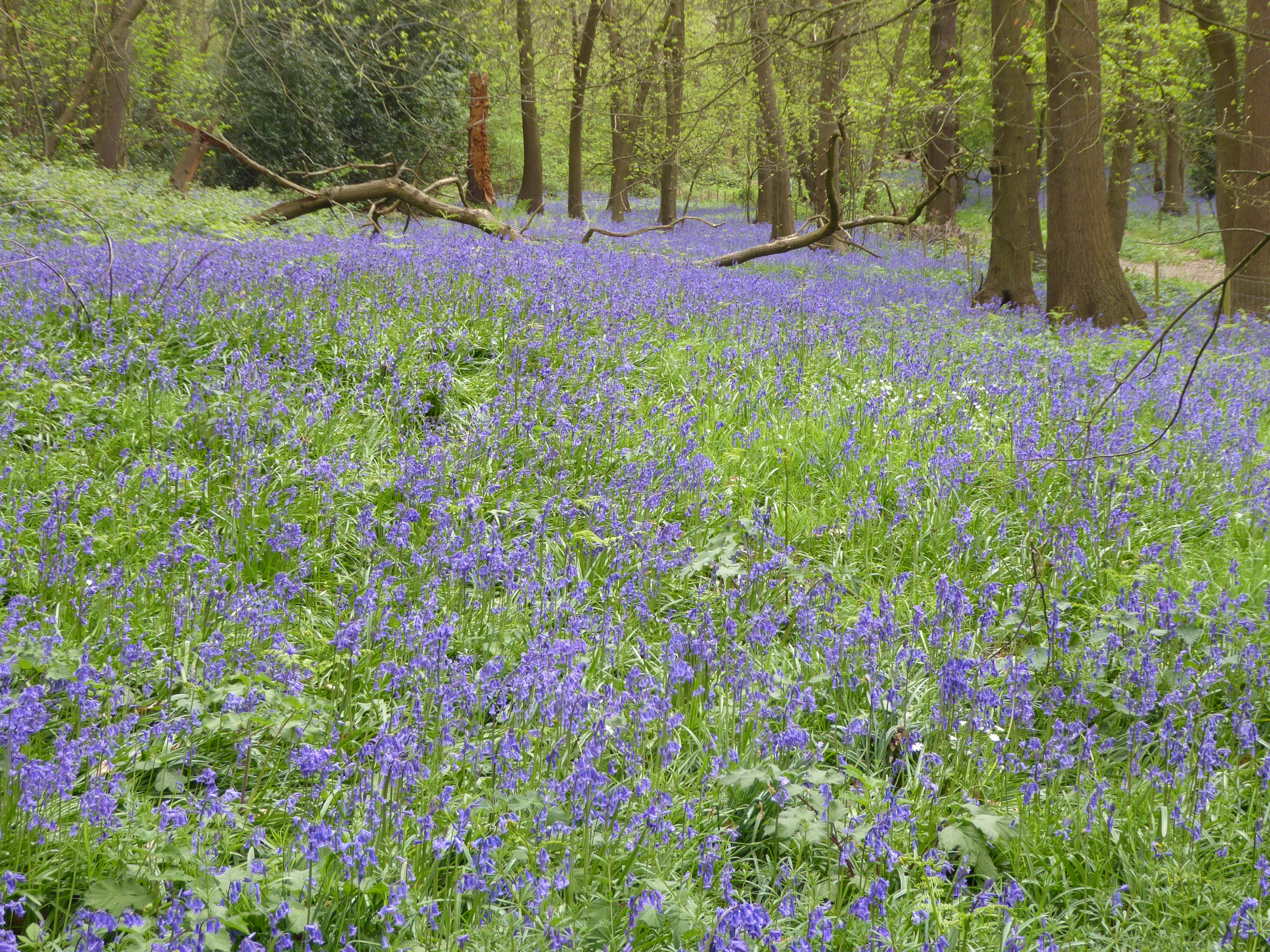
Bluebells in Lesnes Abbey Wood

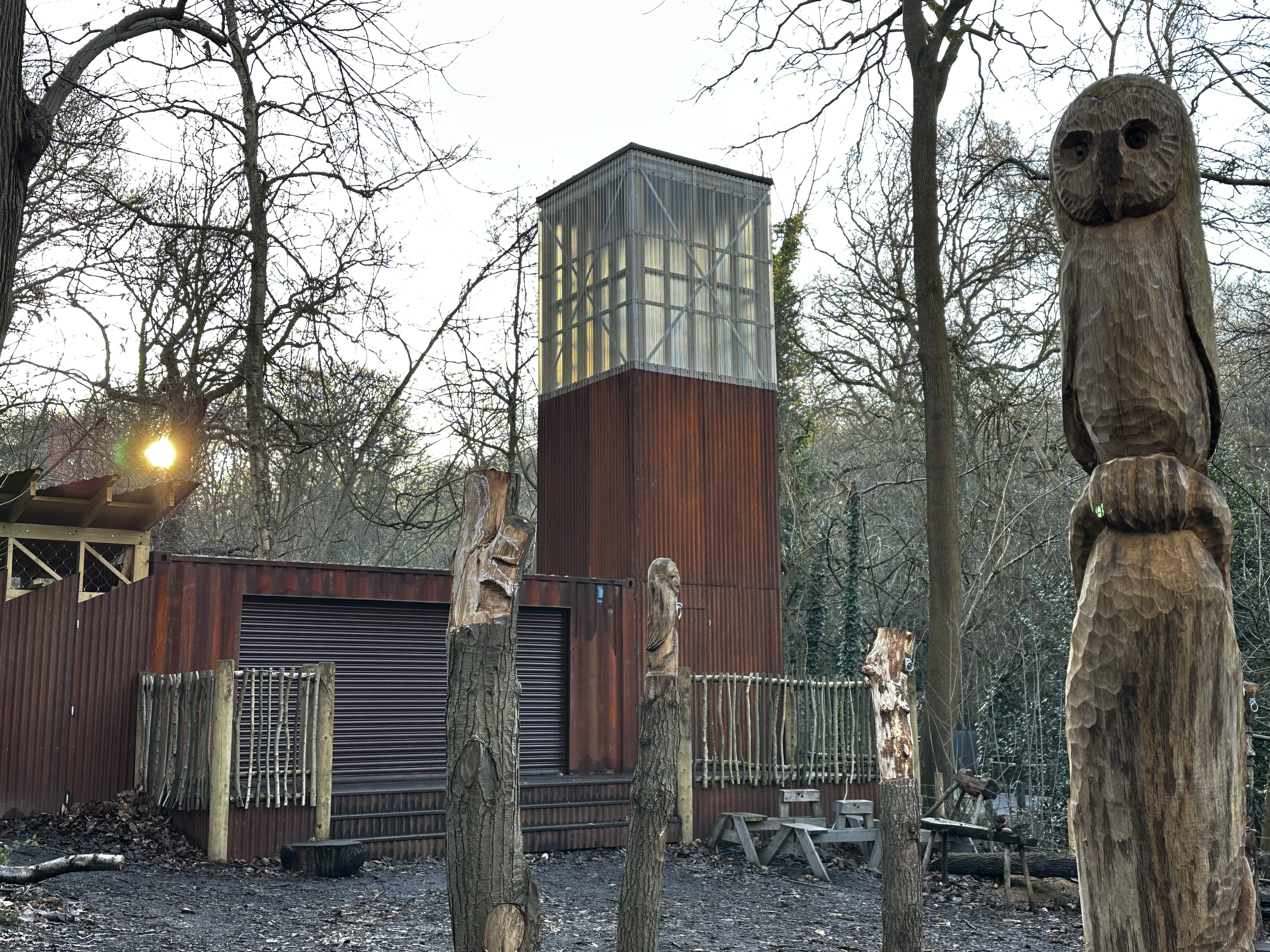
Sculptures in The Clearing

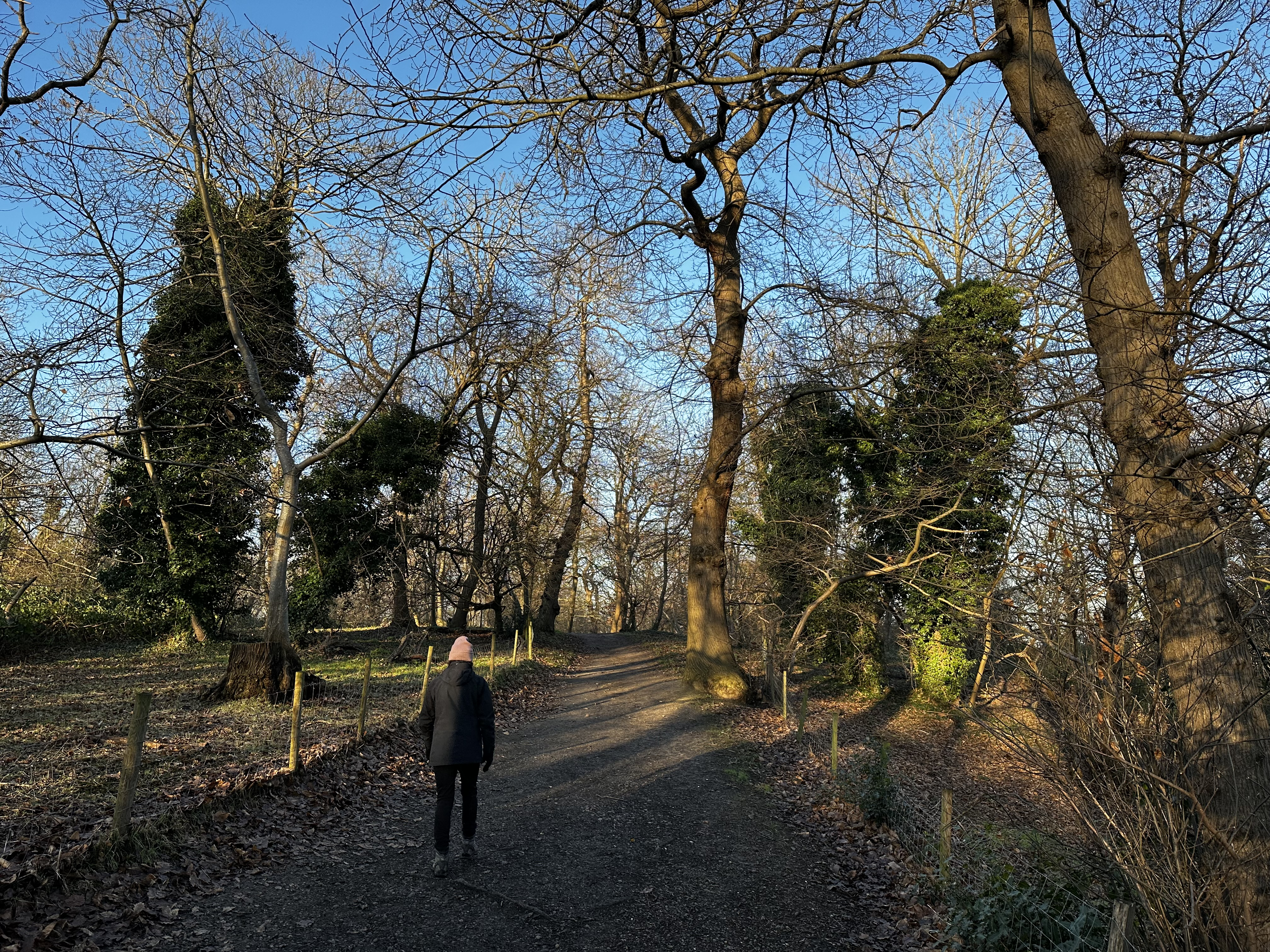
Woodland Paths in Lesnes Abbey Woods

Places of interest include the ruins of the 12th-century Lesnes Abbey and the adjacent Lesnes Abbey Woods, a Local Nature Reserve. Part of the Woods are designated as a Site of Special Scientific Interest called Abbey Wood, which has important Paleogene fossils. The ancient Bostall Woods & Heath are part of the South East London Green Chain - a 40-mile, signposted network of footpaths link together many of the finest open spaces in South East London. This area includes one of the few camping and caravan sites in London, which is owned and operated by The Caravan Club. The co-operative woods were also the site of the first camp for the Woodcraft Folk.

St. Michael and All Angels Parish Church was opened in a temporary building in 1905. A permanent church, designed by Sir Arthur Blomfield, was consecrated three years later, and the original building became the church hall. The 'Grade I' listed Victorian Crossness Pumping Station is described by architectural historian Nikolaus Pevsner as "a masterpiece of engineering – a Victorian cathedral of ironwork".

== Recreational facilities and parks ==
Abbey Wood has a number of parks and sports areas, including Bostall Gardens (play area, tennis courts and basketball court), Bostall Heath (cricket pitch, bowling green, orienteering, football pitch) and Abbey Wood Park (play area and football pitch). It also has a women's netball team Abbey Angels. Abbey Wood Yoga offer yoga classes at St Paul's Academy, Bostall Gardens and pop-up events in and around Abbey Wood.

== Politics and government ==
Abbey Wood is part of the Erith and Thamesmead constituency for elections to the House of Commons of the United Kingdom, currently represented by Abena Oppong-Asare.

Abbey Wood is part of the Abbey Wood ward for elections to Greenwich London Borough Council.

== Notable people ==
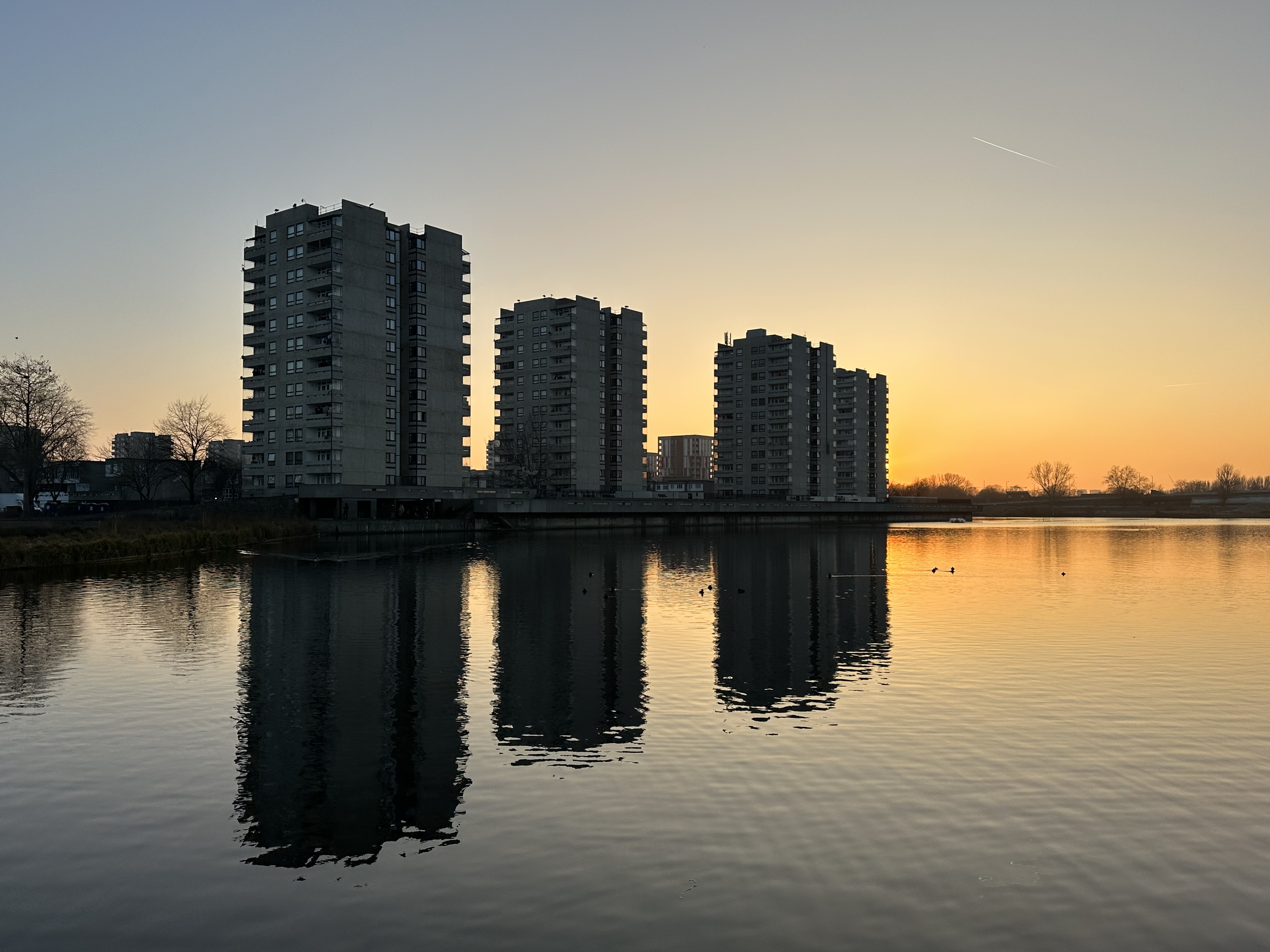
Southmere Lake with Thamesmead blocks

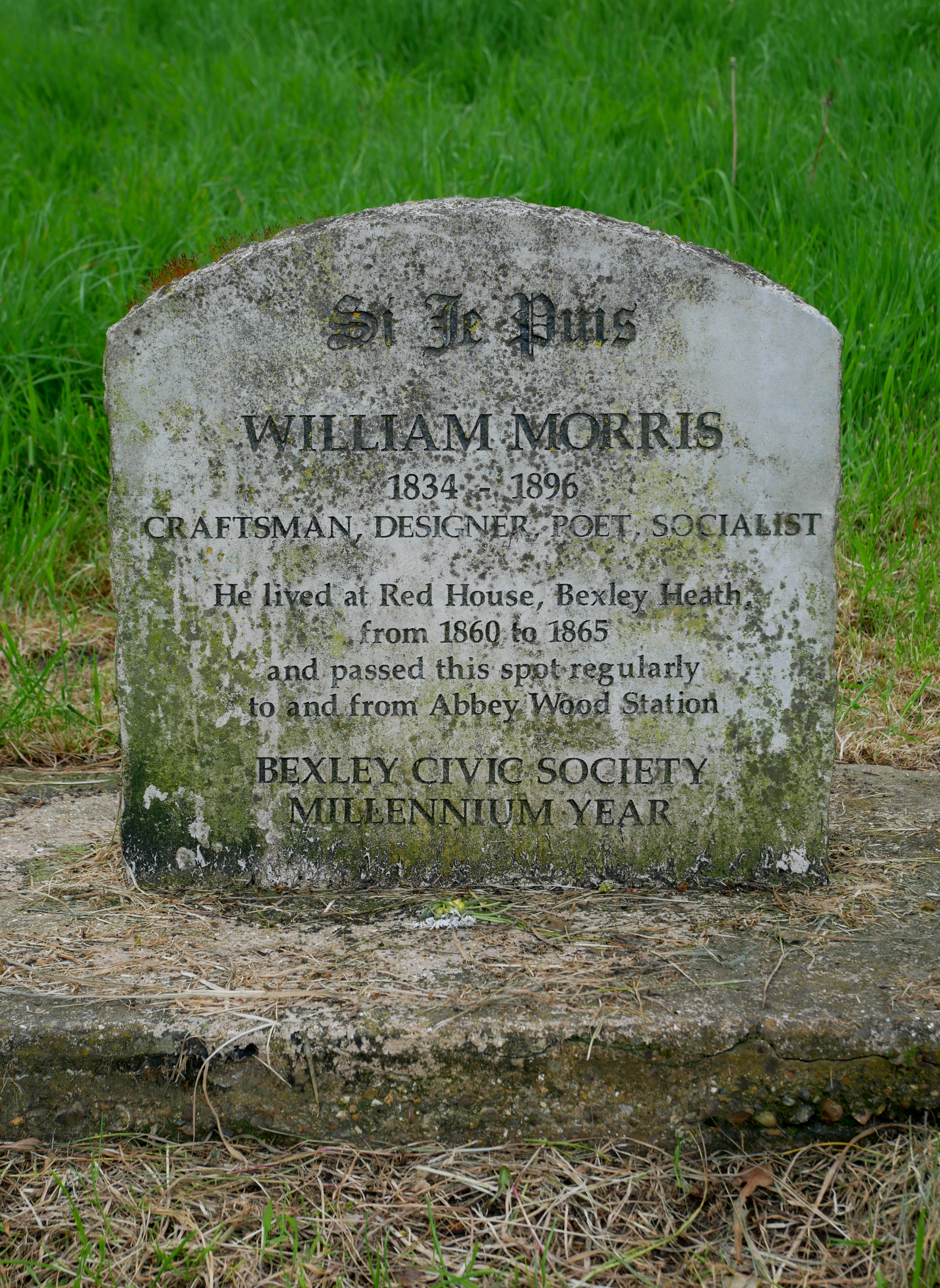
Memorial stone to William Morris in Abbey Wood

Sir Charles Tilston Bright, the British electrical engineer who oversaw the laying of the first transatlantic telegraph cable in 1858, died in Abbey Wood in May 1888.

William Morris lived at the nearby Red House, in Bexleyheath, a house which was built for him by the architect Philip Webb. Morris regularly walked to Abbey Wood station, and a plaque just off Knee Hill commemorates this association.

Stewart Cochrane, a cruise ship bandleader, jazz musician, onetime member of NWOHM band Samson and author of Chindit Special Force Burma 1944 attended DeLucy infant/primary school.

Snooker champion Steve Davis lived in Commonwealth Way, Abbey Wood and went to Alexander McLeod Primary School and Abbey Wood Secondary School. Boxer Julius Francis went to St Thomas a Becket Primary School and Abbey Wood School, and Olympic runner Jennifer Stoute also went to Abbey Wood School. Playwright Jonathan Harvey also taught there. Kate Bush attended the convent school at the top of Knee Hill.

== Culture ==
Time 106.8, a licensed local radio station that evolved from an early cable channel - Radio Thamesmead - had studios on the Abbey Wood/Plumstead borders, and closed in April 2009. Abbey Wood also hosted London's first cable TV station, Cablevision, on Plumstead High Street, near Wickham Lane.

The Thamesmead estate was the focus of an exhibition at RIBA to mark its 50th anniversary. "Thamesmead: A Town for the 21st Century" presented a series of archival images of Thamesmead, displayed alongside contemporary photographs of the estate's residents. The buildings have been utilised as a backdrop for many filmic projects, including the Stanley Kubrick film A Clockwork Orange and the video of "Come to Daddy" by electronic musician Aphex Twin.

The 'Thamesmead Community Archive' is an online archive of material collected from local residents, Bexley Local Studies Archive, London Metropolitan Archive, the British Library, the RIBA archive and local authorities. 'Thamesmead Codex' by artist Bob and Roberta Smith was exhibited at Tate Modern in 2024–2026.

The Lakeside Centre, situated on the edge of Southmere Lake, is home to a growing creative community, with 38 affordable artist studios, two artist in residence studios, a community darkroom and community garden.

== Education ==
St Paul's Academy is a Roman Catholic secondary school located in the area, on the original site of the Abbey Wood comprehensive school. It was previously known as St Paul's RC Secondary School, whilst located in Wickham Lane, before converting to academy status in 2005 when it moved to the new site.

== Geography ==
Abbey Wood borders Thamesmead to the northwest, north and northeast, Belvedere to the east and southeast, West Heath.

The Abbey Wood train station is located approximately 1.4 miles from the River Thames, between the Thames Barrier (3.5 miles to the West) and the Dartford Crossing (6 miles to the East).

== Transport ==
=== Elizabeth Line ===
The station became a terminus for the southeastern branch of the Crossrail-constructed Elizabeth line on 24 May 2022, providing services towards Canary Wharf, Liverpool Street, Bond Street, London Paddington and Heathrow Terminal 5.

=== National Rail ===
The nearest station is Abbey Wood for Southeastern services towards Barnehurst, Crayford, Dartford, Gillingham, London Cannon Street and Charing Cross, and Thameslink services towards Luton.

=== London Buses ===
Abbey Wood is served by the following London Buses routes:

- 177 from Peckham to Thamesmead
- 180 from Erith, Fraser Road to North Greenwich
- 229 from Queen Mary's Hospital to Thamesmead
- 244 from Abbey Wood to Queen Elizabeth Hospital, Woolwich
- 301 from Bexleyheath Shopping Centre to Woolwich
- 401 from Bexleyheath Shopping Centre to Thamesmead
- SL11 from North Greenwich to Abbey Wood
- 469 from Queen Elizabeth Hospital to Erith
- B11 from Bexleyheath to South Thamesmead, Yarnton Way
- SL3 from Thamesmead to Bromley North
- N1 from Thamesmead to Tottenham Court Road (night bus)
- N472 from North Greenwich to Abbey Wood

== Gallery ==
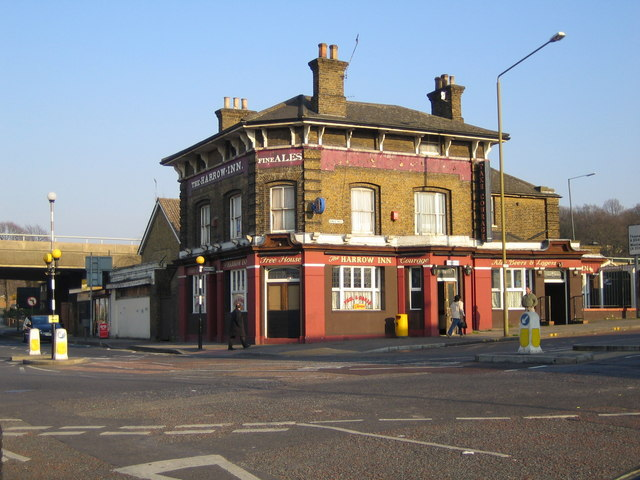
The Harrow Inn, demolished in 2009.

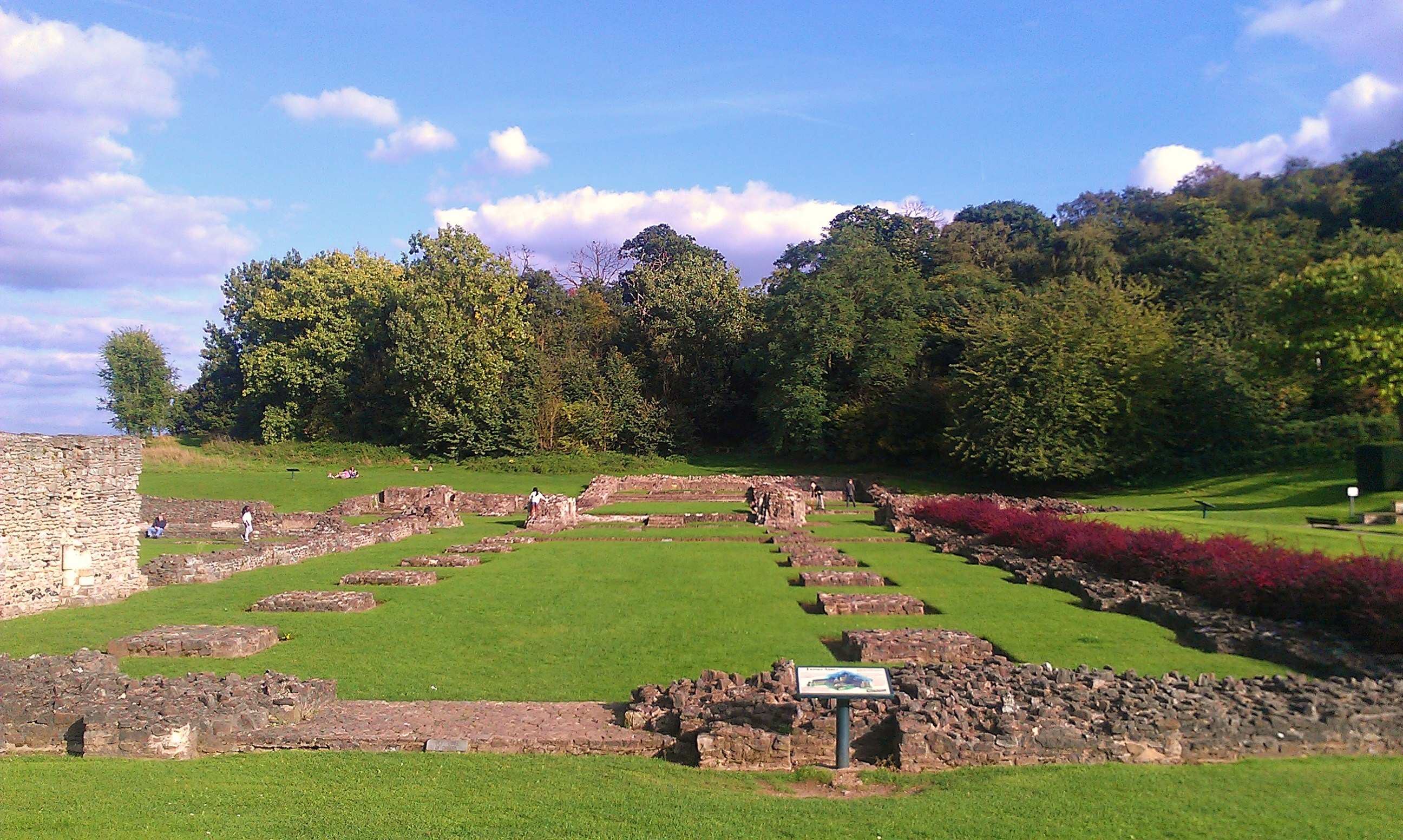
Ruins of Lesnes Abbey

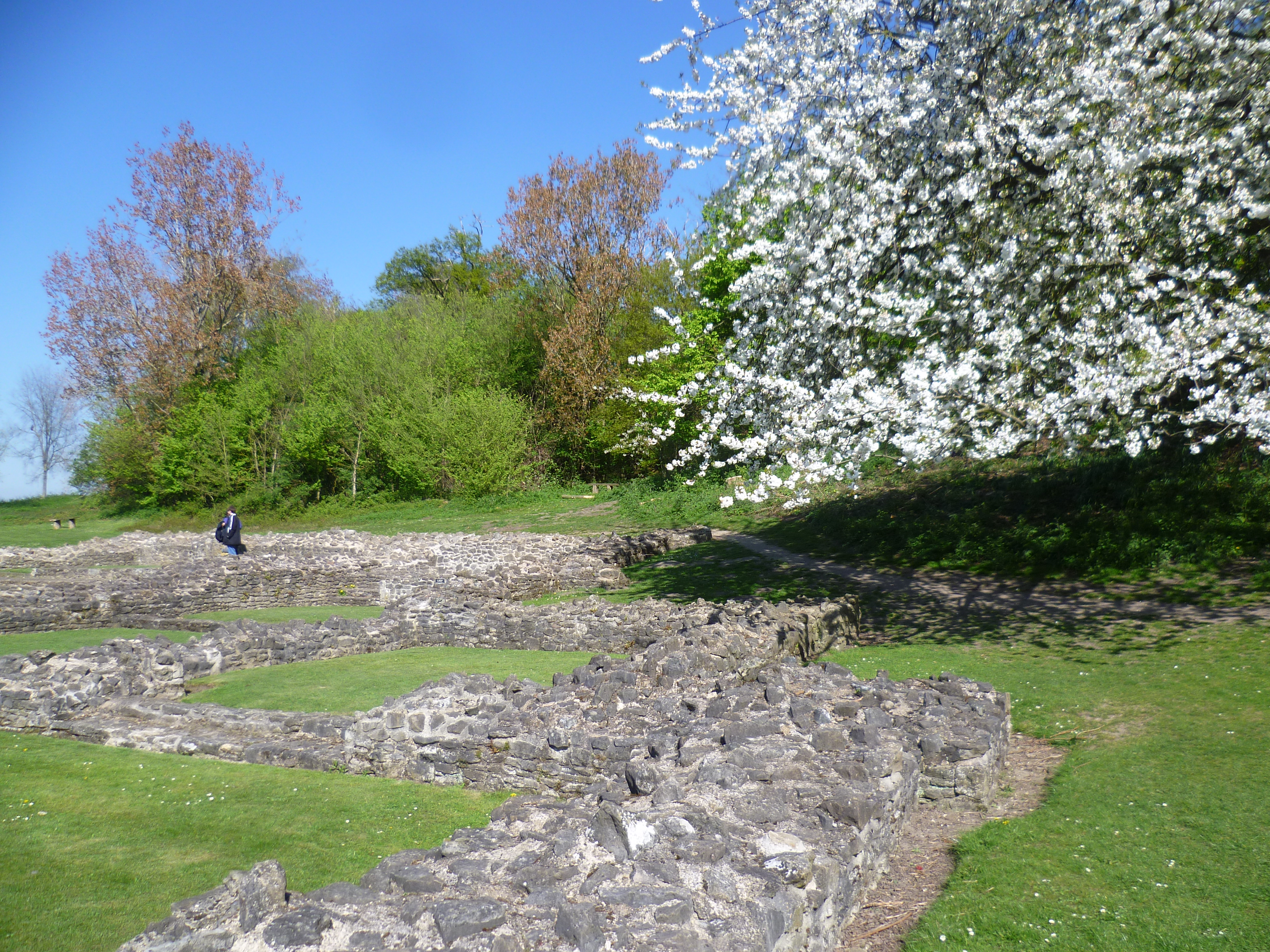
Looking past the high altar of Lesnes Abbey to Lesnes Abbey Woods

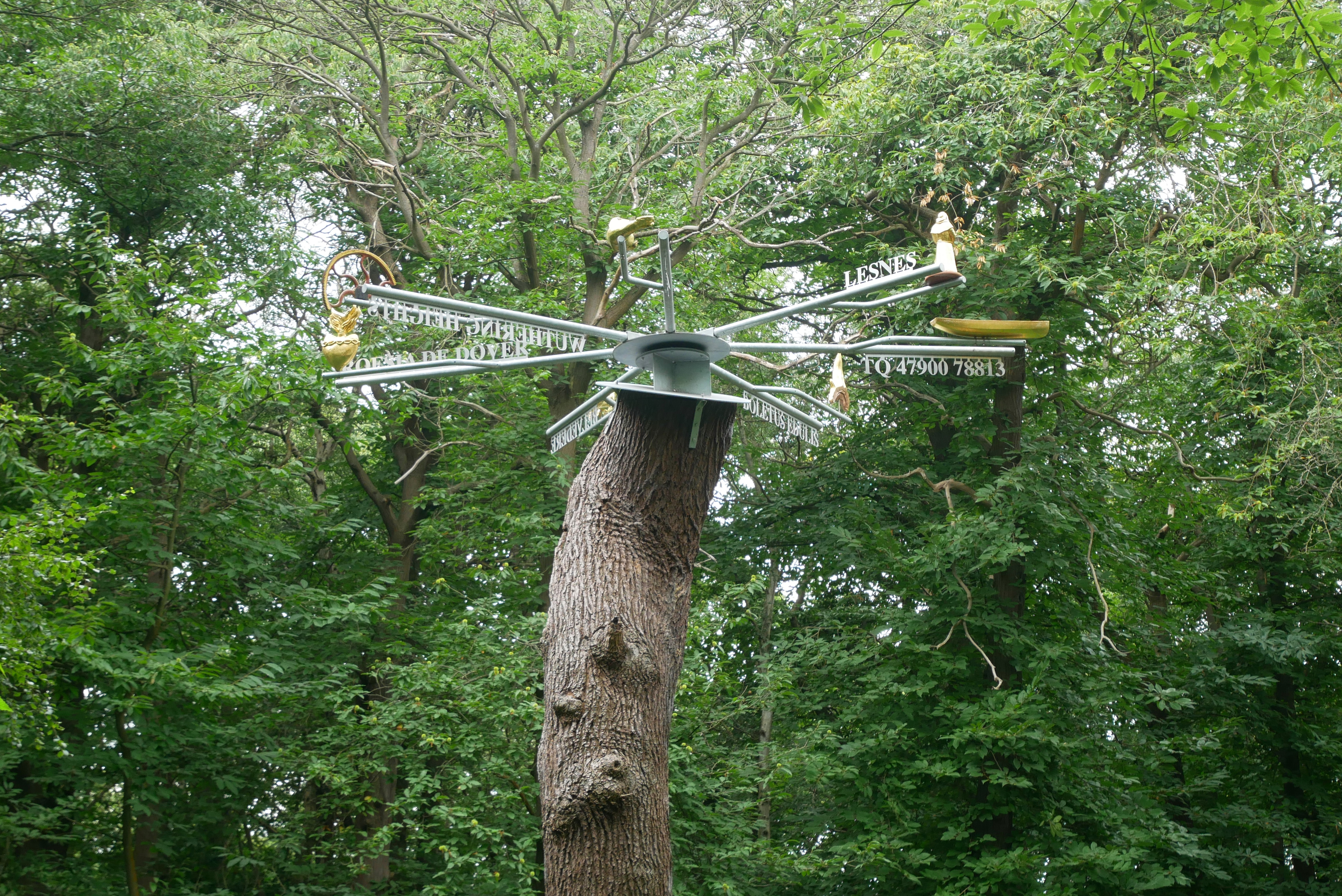
"Data Tree" sculpture at Lesnes Abbey Woods

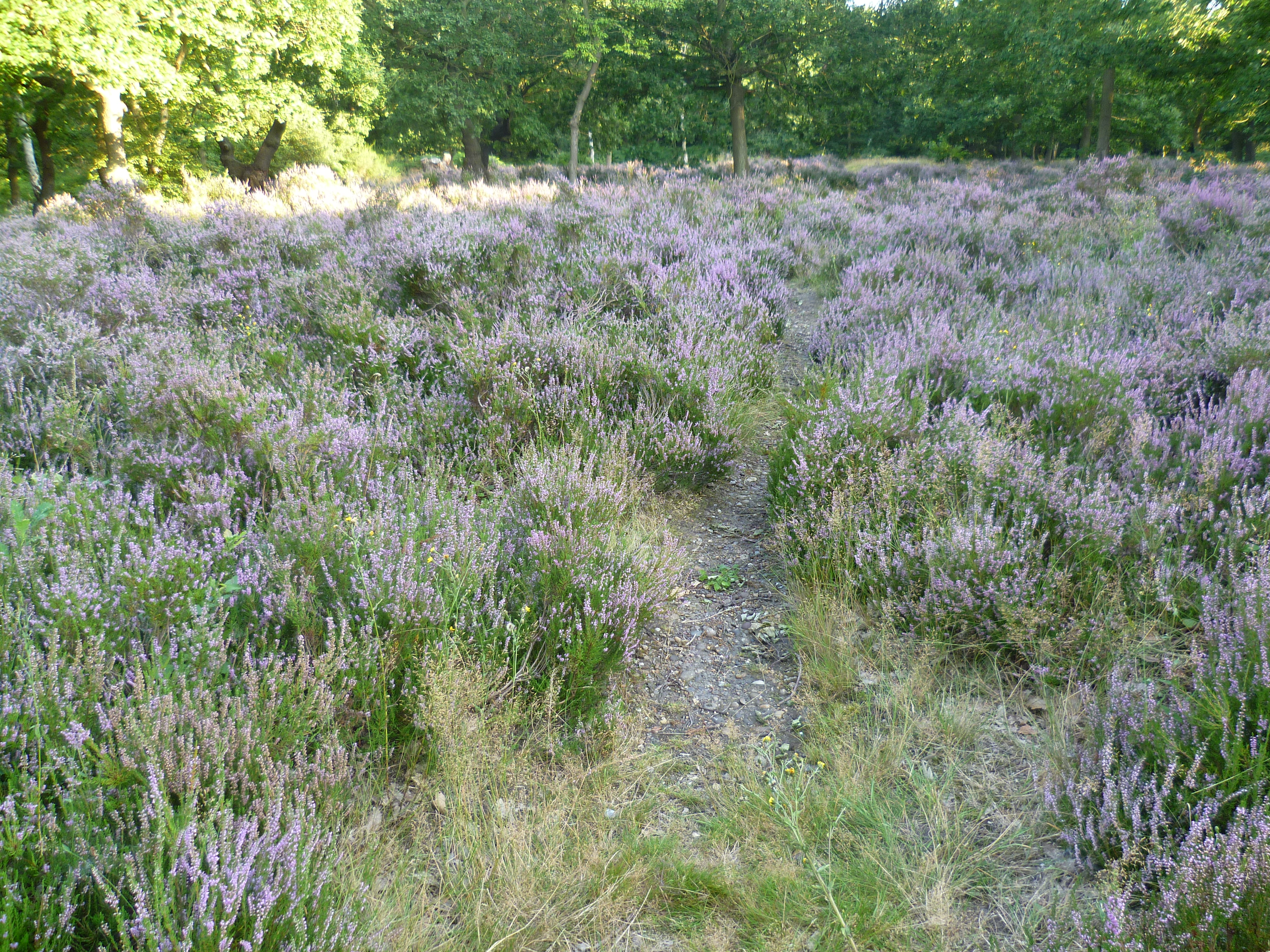
Lesnes Abbey Woods heathland
