= Abbey Wood, Flixton =

Protected area in Suffolk, England

Coordinates: 52.422°N 1.403°E

- Site of Special Scientific Interest
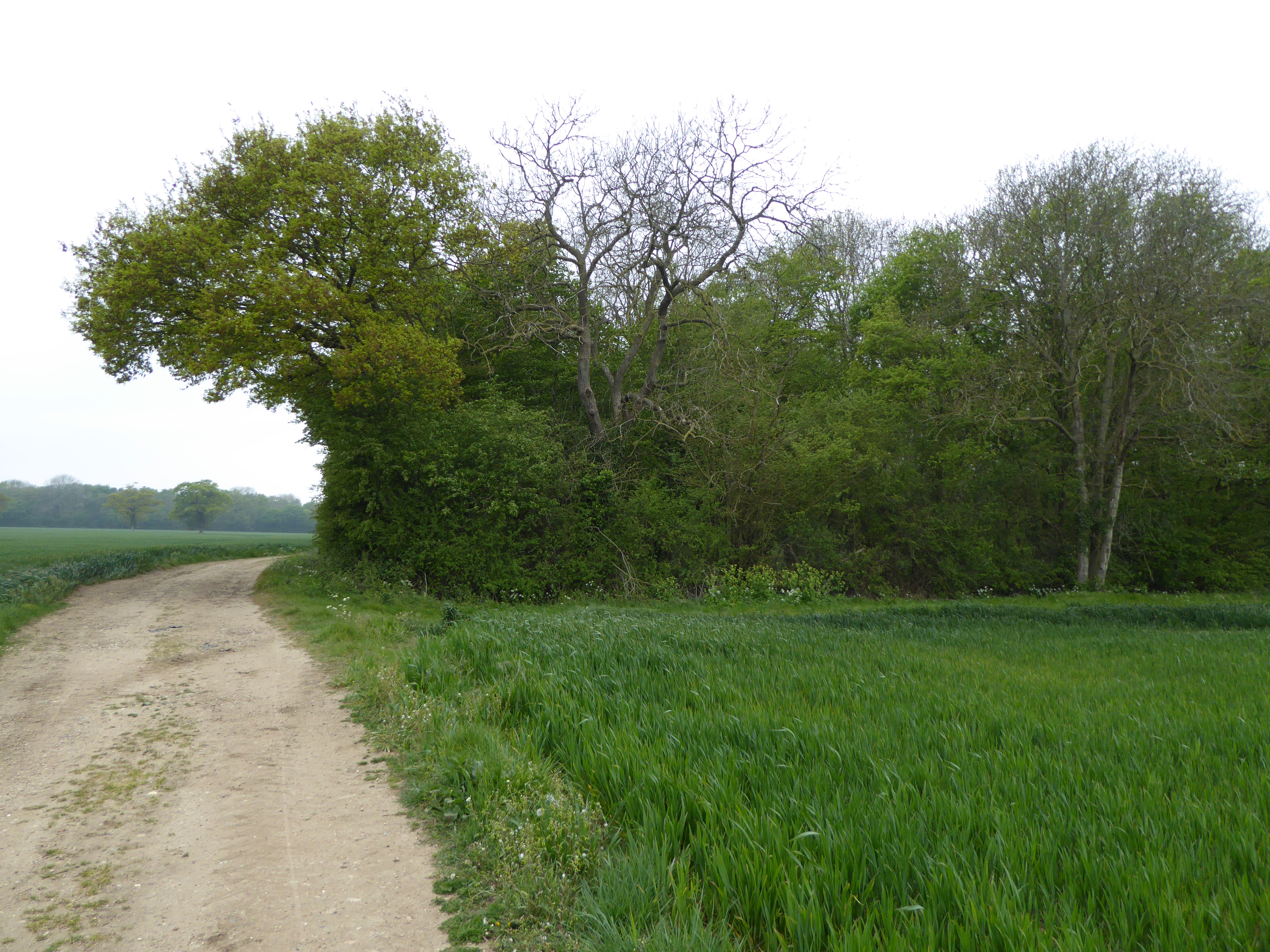
- Packway Wood
- Location of Abbey Wood, Flixton.
- Area of search: Suffolk
- Grid reference: TM 315 859
- Interest: Biological
- Area: 18.0 hectares
- Notification date: 1986
- Location map: Magic Map

Abbey Wood, Flixton is an 18 hectare biological Site of Special Scientific Interest south—west of Bungay in Suffolk. It consists of two adjoining areas, the larger Abbey Wood to the north and the smaller Packway Wood to the south.

This ancient woodland is managed as coppice with standards. Common trees include hazel, hornbeam and oak. The flora are diverse with dog's mercury dominant, and there is one rare species, thin-spiked wood sedge.

The site is private land with no public access.
