= Lesnes Abbey Woods =

Area of ancient woodland in southeast London, England

Coordinates: 51°29′21″N 0°7′41″E

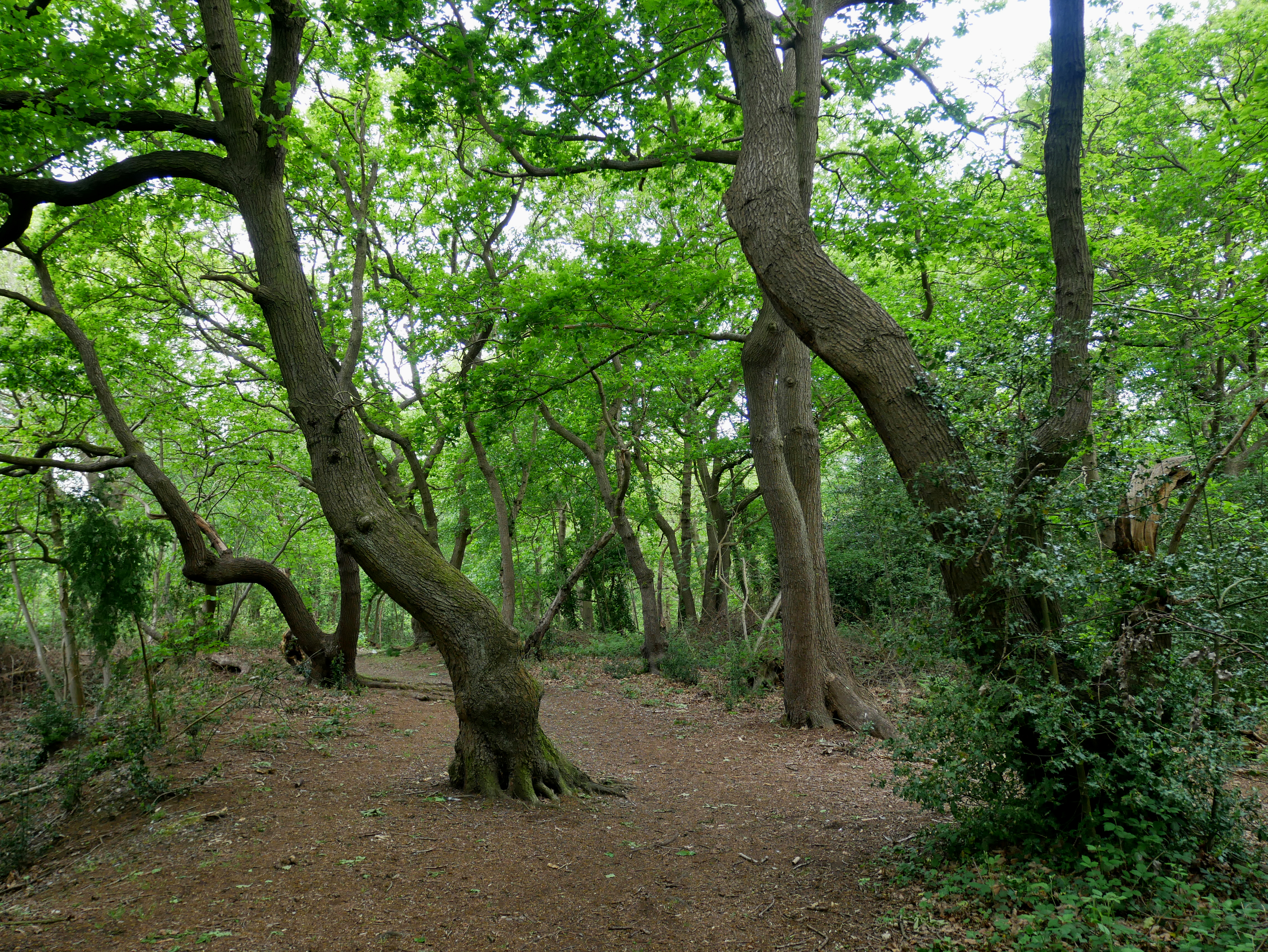
Lesnes Abbey Woods

Lesnes Abbey Woods, sometimes called Abbey Wood, is a 73-hectare ancient woodland in southeast London, England. It is located near to, and named after, the ruined Lesnes Abbey in the London Borough of Bexley and gives its name to the Abbey Wood district. The woods are adjacent to the 159-ha Bostall Woods.

Lesnes Abbey Woods is a Local Nature Reserve and includes the Abbey Wood geological Site of Special Scientific Interest, an important site for early Tertiary fossils.

== Volunteers ==
Friends of Lesnes Abbey and Woods (FOLAW), established in 2021, is, as of 2024, a volunteer group at the woods. The Friends Litter Picking Group meets monthly. FOLAW were nominated for two awards in the Bexley Volunteer Excellence Awards 2024.

Lesnes Abbey Conservation Volunteers (LACV), established in 1994, protects and enhances "the native wildlife and important wildlife habitats".
