= Kent Country =

Bus operator in South London and Kent

- A Kent Country Alexander Dennis Enviro200 in Detling in April 2026
- Parent: Go-Ahead Group
- Founded: 2025; 1 year ago
- Commenced operation: October 26, 2025
- Headquarters: Dartford
- Service area: Kent; South London
- Service type: Bus
- Routes: 9
- Destinations: Orpington; Crockenhill; Swanley; Hextable; Wilmington; Dartford; Bluewater; Gravesend; Istead Rise; Meopham; Vigo; Wrotham; Borough Green; Ightham; Seal; Sevenoaks; Shorne; Cobham; Higham; Cliffe; Hawley; Sutton-at-Hone; South Darenth; Horton Kirby; Temple Hill
- Hubs: Dartford; Bluewater; Gravesend
- Depots: 1
- Fleet: 12
- Website: kentcountrybuses.co.uk

Kent Country is a bus operator brand under London General Transport Services Limited and a subsidiary of Go-Ahead London. It is a subsidiary of the Go-Ahead Group and operates services in Kent and South London.

== History ==
On 2 September 2025, Arriva Kent Thameside announced that they would be withdrawing their service 477 between Orpington and Dartford. This sparked concerns from local residents along the route that they would be left without public transport services.

On 10 September 2025, it was announced by the Go-Ahead Group that they would be taking over route 477 under the new Kent Country brand, operating from the same garage as the Go-Ahead London-operated Fastrack services in Kent Thameside.

On 26 October 2025, Kent Country commenced operations on route 477, running between Orpington and Dartford.

In June 2026, it was announced that Kent Country had been awarded the contracts for the following routes by Kent County Council:

- 306/308: Gravesend to Sevenoaks
- 414: South Darenth to Dartford
- 416: Gravesend to Meopham
- 417: Gravesend to Cliffe
- Dart1/Dart2: Dartford circular services
- Dart3: Dartford to Knockhall Primary School (school service)

Kent Country commenced operations of routes 306, 308, 416 and 417 on 29 June 2026 with all four routes extended from Gravesend to Bluewater Shopping Centre on the same date. Routes 414, Dart1, Dart2 and Dart3 commenced operations with Kent Country on 1 August 2026.

== Services ==
=== Route 477 ===
477

Overview
- Operator: Kent Country
- Garage: Dartford
- Vehicle: Alexander Dennis Enviro200
- Peak vehicle requirement: 2
- Began service: 26 October 2025 (under Kent Country)
- Former operators: Arriva Southern Counties; Kentish Bus; London Country

Route
- Start: Orpington
- Via: Crockenhill; Swanley; Hextable; Wilmington
- End: Dartford
- Length: 11 miles (18 km)

Service
- Level: Daily
- Frequency: Every 60 minutes
- Journey time: 42-65 minutes
- Operates: 06:10 until 21:04

Route 477 was the first service to be operated by Kent Country and operates between Orpington and Dartford via Crockenhill, Swanley, Hextable and Wilmington.

The route operates at a frequency of one bus per hour, seven days a week.

=== Routes 306/308 ===
306/308

Overview
- Operator: Kent Country
- Garage: Dartford
- Vehicle: Alexander Dennis Enviro200
- Peak vehicle requirement: 2
- Began service: 29 June 2026 (under Kent Country)
- Former operators: Redroute Buses; Arriva Southern Counties

Route
- Start: Bluewater Shopping Centre
- Via: Gravesend; Istead Rise; Meopham; Vigo Village; Wrotham; Borough Green; Ightham; Seal
- End: Sevenoaks

Service
- Level: Monday–Saturday
- Frequency: Every 90-120 minutes
- Operates: 06:49 until 18:56

Routes 306 and 308 were taken over by Kent Country on 29 June 2026 and operate between Bluewater Shopping Centre and Sevenoaks.

The routes operate approximately every 90-120 minutes on weekdays and Saturdays although the Saturday services operates between Bluewater Shopping Centre and Vigo Village only.

=== Route 416 ===
416

Overview
- Operator: Kent Country
- Garage: Dartford
- Vehicle: Alexander Dennis Enviro200
- Peak vehicle requirement: 1
- Began service: 29 June 2026 (under Kent Country)
- Former operator: Redroute Buses

Route
- Start: Bluewater Shopping Centre
- Via: Gravesend; Chalk; Shorne; Cobham
- End: Meopham

Service
- Level: Monday–Saturday
- Frequency: 2-5 journeys per day
- Operates: 07:17 until 17:12

Route 416 was taken over by Kent Country on 29 June 2026 and operates between Bluewater Shopping Centre and Meopham.

The route operates 2-5 journeys per day on weekdays and Saturdays although the Saturday services operates between Gravesend and Meopham only.

=== Route 417 ===
417

Overview
- Operator: Kent Country
- Garage: Dartford
- Vehicle: Alexander Dennis Enviro200
- Peak vehicle requirement: 1
- Began service: 29 June 2026 (under Kent Country)
- Former operator: Redroute Buses

Route
- Start: Bluewater Shopping Centre
- Via: Gravesend; Chalk; Shorne; Higham; Cliffe Woods
- End: Cliffe

Service
- Level: Monday–Saturday
- Frequency: 3 journeys per day
- Operates: 07:24 until 17:48

Route 417 was taken over by Kent Country on 29 June 2026 and operates between Bluewater Shopping Centre and Cliffe.

The route operates 3 journeys per day on weekdays and Saturdays although the Saturday services operates between Gravesend and Cliffe only.

=== Route 414 ===
414

Overview
- Operator: Kent Country
- Garage: Dartford
- Vehicle: Alexander Dennis Enviro200
- Peak vehicle requirement: 1
- Began service: 1 August 2026 (under Kent Country)
- Former operator: Arriva Southern Counties

Route
- Start: South Darenth
- Via: Horton Kirby; Sutton-at-Hone; Hawley; Wilmington
- End: Dartford

Service
- Level: Monday–Saturday
- Frequency: Every 60 minutes
- Journey time: 22-36 minutes
- Operates: 06:18 until 19:33

Route 414 was taken over by Kent Country on 1 August 2026 and operates between South Darenth and Dartford.

The route operates at a frequency of one bus per hour on weekdays and Saturdays only.

=== Routes Dart1/Dart2 ===
Dart1/Dart2

Overview
- Operator: Kent Country
- Garage: Dartford
- Vehicle: Alexander Dennis Enviro200
- Peak vehicle requirement: 1
- Began service: 1 August 2026 (under Kent Country)
- Former operators: 1st Bus Stop; Go-Coach

Route
- Start: Dartford
- Via: Dartford Heath (Dart1); Temple Hill (Dart2)
- End: Dartford

Service
- Level: Monday–Saturday
- Frequency: Every 60 minutes
- Operates: 09:02 until 15:36

Routes Dart1 and Dart2 were taken over by Kent Country on 1 August 2026 and operate as circular services to and from Dartford.

Route Dart1 operates as the West Dartford circular route via Dartford Heath, and route Dart2 operates as the East Dartford circular route via Temple Hill.

The routes operate at a frequency of one bus per hour on weekdays and Saturdays only.

=== Route Dart3 ===
Dart3

Overview
- Operator: Kent Country
- Garage: Dartford
- Vehicle: Alexander Dennis Enviro200
- Peak vehicle requirement: 1
- Began service: 1 September 2026 (under Kent Country)
- Former operators: 1st Bus Stop; Go-Coach

Route
- Start: Dartford
- Via: Temple Hill; Stone; Greenhithe
- End: Knockhall Primary School

Service
- Level: Monday–Friday (schooldays only)
- Operates: 07:38 until 08:30; 15:25 until 16:09

School route Dart3 was taken over by Kent Country on 1 August 2026 and commenced operations on 1 September 2026, operating between Dartford and Knockhall Primary School.

The route operates one return journey on schooldays only.

== Garage and fleet ==
Kent Country services operate from their garage in Dartford, the same garage used to operate Fastrack bus rapid transit services in Kent Thameside.

The current Kent Country fleet is formed of eleven Alexander Dennis Enviro200s and one Alexander Dennis Enviro200 MMC.
