= Horton Kirby and South Darenth =

- Civil parish
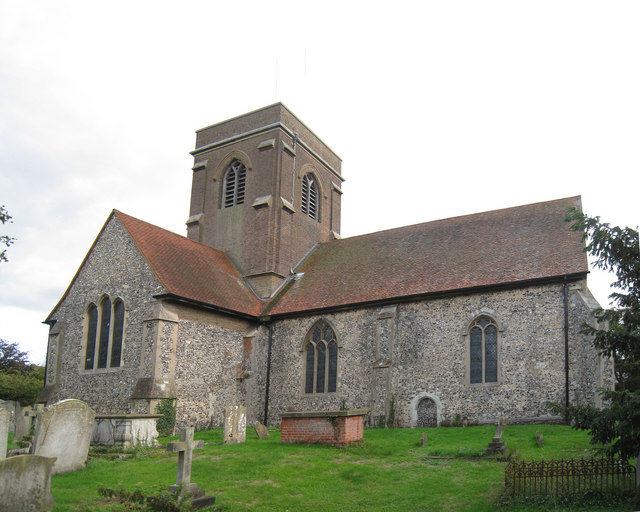
- Horton Kirby church
- Interactive map of Horton Kirby and South Darenth
- Coordinates: 51°24′N 0°15′E
- Country: England
- Primary council: Sevenoaks
- County: Kent
- Region: South East
- Status: Parish
- Main settlements: Horton Kirby, South Darenth

Government
  - Type: Parish Council
  - UK Parliament: Sevenoaks

Population ((2011 Census))
  - Total: 3,492
- Website: Horton Kirby and South Darenth Parish Council

Horton Kirby and South Darenth, formerly just Horton Kirby is a civil parish in the Sevenoaks district of Kent, England. The parish is located in the River Darent valley between Sevenoaks town and Dartford: it consists of the two villages of Horton Kirby and South Darenth. On 1 April 1979 the parish was renamed from "Horton Kirby" to "Horton Kirby & South Darenth".

Horton Kirby Paper Mills in South Darenth were founded by Henry Hall at the beginning of the 19th century. Since June 2003, the mills have ceased processing paper.

== See also ==
- Listed buildings in Horton Kirby and South Darenth
