= Teresa O'Neill, Baroness O'Neill of Bexley =

British politician

The Right Honourable The Baroness O'Neill of Bexley OBE
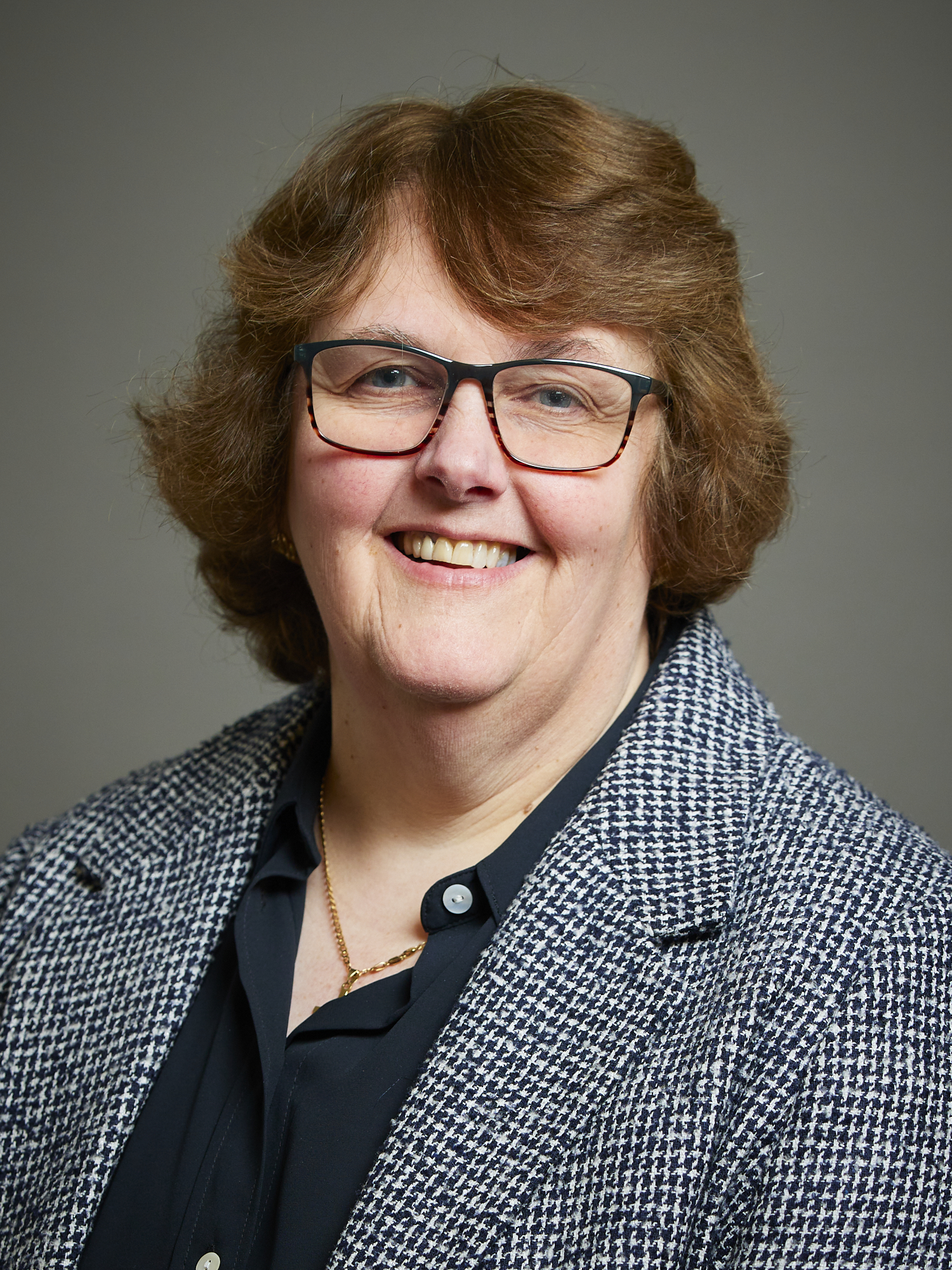
- Official portrait, 2023

Member of the House of Lords
- Lord Temporal
- Life peerage 7 November 2022

Councillor for Crook Log on Bexley London Borough Council
- Incumbent
- Assumed office 2018

Personal details
- Born: 18 July 1961 (age 65) Camberwell, London
- Party: Conservative

Teresa Ann Jude O'Neill, Baroness O'Neill of Bexley, OBE (born 18 July 1961) is a British Conservative Party politician, life peer, and co-president of London Councils. She was the Leader of the London Borough of Bexley from 2008 to 2025.

== Biography ==
O'Neill was born on 18 July 1961 to David O'Neill and Bridget (Breeda) O'Neill in Camberwell, south London, who moved there from Limerick in the previous year. O'Neill attended St Theresa's Roman Catholic School in Lewisham for her secondary education. After leaving school, O'Neill first worked in the insurance industry. After seven years, she moved into investment banking, and worked for the firm Smith New Court (acquired by Merrill Lynch in 1995).

In the 1986 Lewisham London Borough Council election, O'Neill stood as the Conservative candidate in the Blackheath ward, where she came third. She stood for the same ward in the 1990 election, and came third again. In the 1992 general election, she stood for the Conservatives in the Lewisham Deptford constituency, and came second, losing to Labour's Joan Ruddock.

After her loss in the 1992 general election, O'Neill chose to stop pursuing a career in politics, citing the lack of job security. However, she changed her mind after Tony Blair's landslide victory in the 1997 general election. Having moved to Bexley in 1997, she became a Councillor for Crook Log ward in the London Borough of Bexley in 1998. In 2008, she became leader of the Council. She stood down as leader in November 2025 to focus on her work in the House of Lords. She did not stand for re-election in the May 2026 Bexley Council election.

== Honours ==
In 2015, O'Neill was awarded an OBE for services to the community and local government. In the 2022 Special Honours, it was announced that she would receive a life peerage. On 7 November 2022, she was created Baroness O'Neill of Bexley, of Crook Log in the London Borough of Bexley.
