= DA postcode area =

Postcode area within the United Kingdom

Dartford
- Postcode area
- Coordinates: 51.441°N 0.222°E
- Country: United Kingdom
- Postcode area: DA
- Postcode area name: Dartford
- Post towns: 11
- Postcode districts: 18
- Postcode sectors: 59
- Postcodes (live): 9,026
- Postcodes (total): 12,829
- Statistics as at May 2020

The DA postcode area, also known as the Dartford postcode area, is a group of eighteen postcode districts in England, within eleven post towns. These cover parts of south-east London and north-west Kent.

The main sorting office in Dartford ceased operating in 2012 and became a Delivery Office. The area served includes most of the London Borough of Bexley and very small parts of the London Borough of Bromley and the Royal Borough of Greenwich, while in Kent it covers almost all the Borough of Dartford, most of the Gravesham district, the northeastern part of the Sevenoaks district and a very small part of the borough of Tonbridge and Malling.

== Coverage ==
The approximate coverage of the postcode districts:

Postcode district	Post town	Coverage	Local authority area(s)
DA1	DARTFORD	Dartford, Crayford, Barnes Cray	Dartford, Bexley
DA2	DARTFORD	Dartford (east), Stone, Wilmington, Bean, Hawley, Darenth, part of Joyden's Wood	Dartford, Sevenoaks
DA3	LONGFIELD	Longfield, Hartley, New Ash Green, New Barn, Fawkham	Dartford, Sevenoaks, Gravesham
DA4	DARTFORD	Farningham, Eynsford, South Darenth, Sutton-at-Hone, Horton Kirby	Sevenoaks, Dartford
DA5	BEXLEY	Bexley, Bexley Village, Blendon, parts of Albany Park and Joyden's Wood	Bexley, Dartford
DA6	BEXLEYHEATH	Bexleyheath, Upton, Crook Log	Bexley
DA7	BEXLEYHEATH	Bexleyheath (north), Barnehurst, Crook Log, Abbey Wood (part)	Bexley, Greenwich
DA8	ERITH	Erith, Northumberland Heath, Slade Green	Bexley
DA9	GREENHITHE	Greenhithe, Stone	Dartford
DA10	SWANSCOMBE	Swanscombe, Ebbsfleet	Dartford
DA11	GRAVESEND	Gravesend (west), Northfleet	Gravesham, Dartford
DA12	GRAVESEND	Gravesend (east), Chalk, Shorne, Cobham	Gravesham
DA13	GRAVESEND	Meopham, Istead Rise, Vigo, Southfleet	Gravesham, Dartford, Sevenoaks, Tonbridge and Malling
DA14	SIDCUP	Sidcup, Foots Cray, North Cray, Longlands, Ruxley, part of Albany Park	Bexley, Bromley
DA15	SIDCUP	Sidcup (north), Blackfen, Lamorbey, Longlands, Avery Hill (part)	Bexley, Greenwich
DA16	WELLING	Welling, Falconwood, East Wickham, Crook Log	Bexley, Greenwich
DA17	BELVEDERE	Belvedere, Upper Belvedere, Lessness Heath, West Heath, Abbey Wood (part)	Bexley, Greenwich
DA18	ERITH	Erith Marshes, Thamesmead (part)	Bexley, Greenwich

== Map ==
DA postcode area map, showing postcode districts in red and post towns in grey text, with links to nearby BR, ME, RM, SE and TN postcode areas.

== See also ==
- List of postcode areas in the United Kingdom
- Postcode Address File
