= Listed buildings in Horton Kirby and South Darenth =

Civil Parish in Kent, England

Horton Kirby and South Darenth is a village and civil parish in the Sevenoaks District of Kent, England. It contains one grade I, one grade II* and 40 grade II listed buildings that are recorded in the National Heritage List for England.

This list is based on the information retrieved online from Historic England.

== Key ==
Grade	Criteria
I	Buildings that are of exceptional interest
II*	Particularly important buildings of more than special interest
II	Buildings that are of special interest

== Listing ==
Name	Grade	Location	Type	Completed (Note: The date given is the date used by Historic England as significant for the initial building or that of an important part in the structure's description.)	Date designated	Grid ref. (Note: The grid reference is based on the British national grid reference system, sometimes known as OSGB36, used by the Ordnance Survey.) Geo-coordinates	Notes	Entry number (Note: The "List Entry Number" is a unique number assigned to each listed building and scheduled monument by Historic England.)	Image	Wikidata
Central Warehouse Building Horton Kirby Paper Mills	II				7 January 1992	TQ5631469551; 51°24′12″N 0°14′45″E		1223112	Upload Photo	Q26517390
Barn and Attached Cowshed at Franks Farm	II	Dartford Road			22 October 1982	TQ5522867959; 51°23′22″N 0°13′46″E		1274003	Upload Photo	Q26563698
The Old Farmhouse	II	Dean Bottom, South Darenth			1 June 1967	TQ5872568669; 51°23′41″N 0°16′48″E		1273991	Upload Photo	Q26563687
Whitefield	II	Dean Bottom, South Darenth			22 October 1982	TQ5868668701; 51°23′43″N 0°16′46″E		1238783	Upload Photo	Q26531824
Barn to North of Eglantine Farm	II	Eglantine Lane			22 October 1982	TQ5605167504; 51°23′06″N 0°14′28″E		1274004	Upload Photo	Q26563699
Barn to South West of Eglantine Farmhouse	II	Eglantine Lane			22 October 1982	TQ5602167472; 51°23′05″N 0°14′27″E		1273996	Upload Photo	Q26563691
Eglantine Farmhouse	II	Eglantine Lane			22 October 1982	TQ5604267481; 51°23′06″N 0°14′28″E		1238784	Upload Photo	Q26531825
Barn to East of Little Franks	II	Franks Lane			22 October 1982	TQ5585267741; 51°23′14″N 0°14′18″E		1238788	Upload Photo	Q26531829
Bridge Over River Darenth	II	Franks Lane			22 October 1982	TQ5562567880; 51°23′19″N 0°14′07″E		1238787	Upload Photo	Q26531828
Entrance Gateway to Franks Hall	II	Franks Lane			22 October 1982	TQ5536567965; 51°23′22″N 0°13′54″E		1238785	Upload Photo	Q26531826
Franks Hall	I	Franks Lane			1 August 1952	TQ5550267822; 51°23′17″N 0°14′00″E		1238914	Franks Hall More images	Q15218409
Garden Niche to West of Franks Hall	II	Franks Lane			22 October 1982	TQ5538667834; 51°23′18″N 0°13′54″E		1238786	Upload Photo	Q26531827
Gazebo and Attached Archways to North East of Franks Hall	II	Franks Lane			22 October 1982	TQ5553567838; 51°23′18″N 0°14′02″E		1274005	Upload Photo	Q26563700
Little Franks	II	Franks Lane			22 October 1982	TQ5582867756; 51°23′15″N 0°14′17″E		1238943	Upload Photo	Q26531971
Stables to North of Franks Hall	II	Franks Lane			22 October 1982	TQ5551667897; 51°23′20″N 0°14′01″E		1238938	Upload Photo	Q26531967
The White House	II	Holmesdale Hill, South Darenth			22 October 1982	TQ5634569892; 51°24′23″N 0°14′47″E		1238989	Upload Photo	Q26532011
Avenue House	II	Holmesdale Road, South Darenth			1 June 1967	TQ5643469794; 51°24′20″N 0°14′52″E		1238791	Upload Photo	Q26531832
Giffords	II	Holmesdale Road, South Darenth			1 June 1967	TQ5634769671; 51°24′16″N 0°14′47″E		1238790	Upload Photo	Q26531831
Giffords Cottages	II	Holmesdale Road, South Darenth			22 October 1982	TQ5638569596; 51°24′14″N 0°14′49″E		1238789	Upload Photo	Q26531830
Paddock Cottage	II	Holmesdale Road, South Darenth			22 October 1982	TQ5634669758; 51°24′19″N 0°14′47″E		1273914	Upload Photo	Q26563617
Stable Cottage, Former Granary, to the North of Eglantine Farmhouse	II	Horton Kirby, DA4 9JL			22 October 1982	TQ5606067492; 51°23′06″N 0°14′29″E		1238860	Upload Photo	Q26531897
Barns and Oasthouses to South East of Court Lodge	II	Horton Road			22 October 1982	TQ5612568538; 51°23′40″N 0°14′34″E		1261029	Upload Photo	Q26552008
Barns to South East of Court Lodge	II	Horton Road			22 October 1982	TQ5616468551; 51°23′40″N 0°14′36″E		1240469	Upload Photo	Q26533392
Court Lodge	II	Horton Road			22 October 1982	TQ5610868590; 51°23′42″N 0°14′33″E		1239062	Upload Photo	Q26532084
Dovecot to East of Court Lodge	II	Horton Road			22 October 1982	TQ5617768607; 51°23′42″N 0°14′37″E		1238793	Upload Photo	Q26531833
Rashliegh Lodge	II	Horton Road			19 January 1972	TQ5625168352; 51°23′34″N 0°14′40″E		1238794	Upload Photo	Q26531834
The Cottage	II	Horton Road			22 October 1982	TQ5621668521; 51°23′39″N 0°14′38″E		1273920	Upload Photo	Q26563623
The Parish Church of Saint Mary	II*	Horton Road			1 June 1967	TQ5620968559; 51°23′40″N 0°14′38″E		1238792	The Parish Church of Saint Mary More images	Q17545535
Barn to North of Mussenden Farmhouse Fronting Road	II	Mussenden Lane			22 October 1982	TQ5653267694; 51°23′12″N 0°14′53″E		1238795	Upload Photo	Q26531835
Barn to South East of Mussenden Farmhouse	II	Mussenden Lane			22 October 1982	TQ5653167653; 51°23′11″N 0°14′53″E		1273866	Upload Photo	Q26563573
Granary to East of Mussenden Farmhouse	II	Mussenden Lane			22 October 1982	TQ5656067667; 51°23′11″N 0°14′55″E		1274006	Upload Photo	Q26563701
Mussenden Farmhouse	II	Mussenden Lane			22 October 1982	TQ5653167667; 51°23′11″N 0°14′53″E		1239065	Upload Photo	Q26532087
Reynolds Place	II	Rays Hill			22 October 1982	TQ5617167967; 51°23′21″N 0°14′35″E		1273876	Upload Photo	Q26563583
The Coach House to South East of Reynolds Place	II	Rays Hill			22 October 1982	TQ5619567950; 51°23′21″N 0°14′36″E		1273879	Upload Photo	Q26563586
Garden Wall to Reynolds Place Running to North from the Coach House, Turning West Then Returning to North	II	Rays Hill			22 October 1982	TQ5620667969; 51°23′21″N 0°14′37″E		1239116	Upload Photo	Q26532130
Old School Cottage	II	School Lane			22 October 1982	TQ5630368286; 51°23′32″N 0°14′43″E		1273880	Upload Photo	Q26563587
The Chimney at Horton Kirby Paper Mill	II	South Darenth			13 August 2003	TQ5632269508; 51°24′11″N 0°14′46″E		1390590	Upload Photo	Q26669978
Ash Tree House	II	The Street			1 June 1967	TQ5596568172; 51°23′28″N 0°14′25″E		1239117	Upload Photo	Q26532131
Croft House	II	The Street			22 October 1982	TQ5601868345; 51°23′34″N 0°14′28″E		1239121	Upload Photo	Q26532135
Gate Piers and Wall to Kirby Hall Fronting Road	II	The Street			22 October 1982	TQ5598768159; 51°23′28″N 0°14′26″E		1239119	Upload Photo	Q26532133
Kirby Hall and Pyxos	II	The Street			1 June 1967	TQ5601968115; 51°23′26″N 0°14′28″E		1239118	Upload Photo	Q26532132
The White House	II	The Street			1 June 1967	TQ5598168256; 51°23′31″N 0°14′26″E		1239120	Upload Photo	Q26680660

== See also ==
- Grade I listed buildings in Kent
- Grade II* listed buildings in Kent

== Sources ==
- Newman, John (2012) [1969], Kent: West and the Weald, The Buildings of England, New Haven and London: Yale University Press, ISBN 978-0-300-18509-6
