= Crook Log (ward) =

Electoral ward in Bexley, London, England

- Electoral ward for the Bexley London Borough Council
- Borough: Bexley
- County: Greater London
- Population: 15,259 (2021)
- Major settlements: Bexleyheath
- Area: 2.940 km²

Current electoral ward
- Created: 2018
- Councillors: 3

Crook Log is an electoral ward in the London Borough of Bexley. The ward was first used in the 2018 elections. It elects three councillors to Bexley London Borough Council.

== Geography ==
The ward is named after the district of Crook Log.

== Councillors ==
| Election | Councillors | | |
|---|---|---|---|
| 2022 | Teresa O'Neill (Conservative) | Janice Ward-Wilson (Conservative) | Chris Taylor (Conservative) |

== Elections ==
=== 2022 Bexley London Borough Council election ===
Crook Log (3 seats)
| Party | Candidate | Votes | % | ±% |
|---|---|---|---|---|
| Conservative | Teresa O'Neill* | 2,317 | 59.1 | −0.7 |
| Conservative | Janice Ward Wilson | 2,154 | 54.9 | |
| Conservative | Christopher Taylor | 2,077 | 53.0 | |
| Labour | Liam Davies | 1,684 | 43.0 | |
| Labour | Janet White | 1,491 | 38.0 | |
| Labour | Timothy Nicholls | 1,418 | 36.2 | |
| Liberal Democrats | Zoe Brooks | 621 | 15.8 | |
| Turnout | | 11,762 | 36.1 | −4.79% |
| Conservative hold | | Swing | | |
| Conservative hold | | Swing | | |
| Conservative hold | | Swing | | |
