= Hawley, Kent =

Village in Kent, England

Coordinates: 51.4204°N 0.2224°E

Hawley
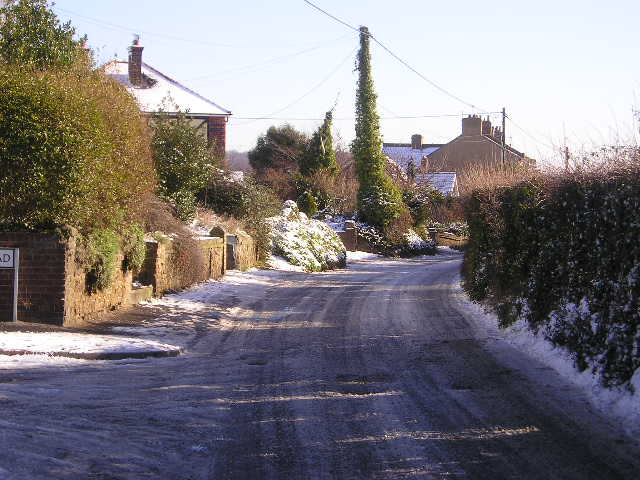
- Hawley in the snow (2004)

- Location within Kent
- Population: 1,386
- OS grid reference: TQ547713
- District: Dartford
- Shire county: Kent
- Region: South East
- Country: England
- Sovereign state: United Kingdom
- Post town: Dartford
- Postcode district: DA2
- Dialling code: 01322
- Police: Kent
- Fire: Kent
- Ambulance: South East Coast
- UK Parliament: Sevenoaks

Hawley is a village in the civil parish of Sutton-at-Hone and Hawley in the Borough of Dartford, Kent, England. It is located 3 miles south of Dartford and 3.8 miles north east of Swanley. In the 19th century, Hawley was noted for its paper mills; John Marius Wilson's Imperial Gazetteer of England and Wales, published in 1870–72, described the settlement as having paper mills..

== Demographics ==
At the 2021 United Kingdom census, Hawley had a population of 1,386.

== Politics ==
Since the 2024 United Kingdom general election, Hawley has been represented by Laura Trott of the Conservative Party, as part of Sevenoaks (UK Parliament constituency).

Since the 2009 Kent County Council election, Hawley has been represented by Jeremy Kite, MBE, of the Conservative Party, as part of the Dartford Rural division.

Since the 2023 Dartford Borough Council election, Hawley has been represented by Avtar Sandhu, Eddy Lampkin, and George Holt as part of the Wilmington, Sutton-at-Hone & Hawley ward. Holt and Lampkin were initially elected in by-elections in January 2022 and February 2023, respectively. All three represent the Conservative Party.

Hawley is part of the Sutton-at-Hone and Hawley Parish Council. The councillors are Krisha White, Emma Youell, Holly Siegenberg, Lee Newitt, Daniel Smith, Emma Connor, Adam Jessett, and Ben White.

== Transport ==
=== Railway ===
The nearest National Rail stations to Hawley are Farningham Road, located 2.2 miles away and Dartford, located 3 miles away.

=== Buses ===
The village is served by the Kent Country route 414 which provides hourly connections to Horton Kirby, South Darenth, Sutton-at-Hone and Dartford.
