= Godfrey Box =

16th-century British entrepreneur

Godfrey Box was a 16th-century English entrepreneur. An immigrant from the Low Countries, he built England's first iron-splitting mill on the River Darent at Dartford Creek in Dartford, Kent, some time between 1590 and 1595.
