= River Darent =

River in Kent, England

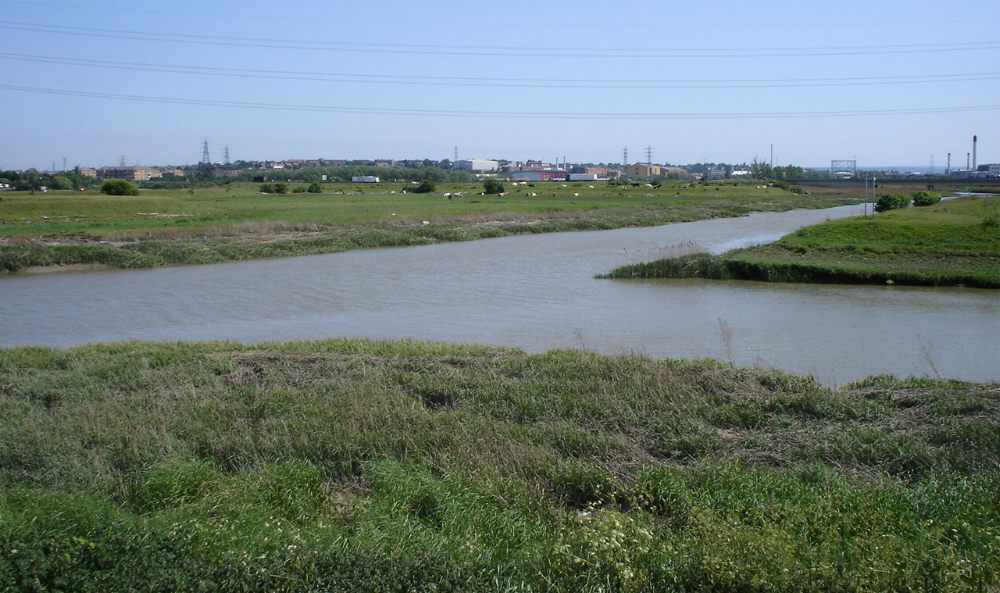
- Confluence of Darent (left) and Cray rivers, viewed from Crayford Marshes, towards Temple Hill

Physical characteristics
- Source
  - location: Hills south of Westerham; TQ 450 519
  - coordinates: 51°14′53″N 0°04′26″E
- Mouth
  - location: River Thames; TQ 541 780
  - coordinates: 51°28′48″N 0°13′12″E
- Length: 20 mi (32 km)

River Darent, in relation to the other rivers of Kent

The Darent is a Kentish tributary of the River Thames and takes the waters of the River Cray as a tributary in the tidal portion of the Darent near Crayford. 'Darenth' is frequently found as the spelling of the river's name in older books and maps, Bartholomew's Canals and River of England being one example. Bartholomew's Gazetteer (1954) demonstrates that Darent means "clear water", a result of it springing from and running through chalk. The purity of the water was a major factor in the development of paper and pharmaceuticals in the area.

Darenth Parish (through which the river flows) derives from a Celtic phrase 'stream where oak-trees grow' (Irish: "dair" = 'oak-tree', "abha" = river) (compare e.g."Derwent"). The landscapes of the valley were painted in a visionary manner by the Victorian artist Samuel Palmer during the mid-1800s.

Fed by springs from the greensand hills south of Westerham in Kent and below Limpsfield Chart in Surrey, the Darent flows 21 miles (34 km) east then north by Otford and Shoreham, past the castle and the ruined Roman villa at Lullingstone, then by Eynsford, Farningham, Horton Kirby, South Darenth, Sutton-at-Hone, Darenth, and eventually to Dartford, whence it proceeds a final two miles as a tidal estuary until it drops into the Thames at Long Reach.

North of Dartford, the Darent is tidal and, just before entering the Thames, receives the waters of the River Cray at Dartford & Crayford Marshes where the rivers form administrative boundaries between Greater London and Kent, (specifically, the London Borough of Bexley and the Kentish borough of Dartford). The Darent enters Long Reach to the east of Crayford Ness.

Kent County Council has signposted a 19-mile (31 km) walking route along the Darent between the Greensand Hills above Sevenoaks and the Thames and named it the Darent Valley Path. The route receives no obvious attention from councils or 'focus' groups although all or part is used by joggers, cyclists, walkers, dog walkers and curious adventurers, availing themselves of the Darent Valley Path to access or view the river's amenities, such as they are. This lack of attention is being addressed in the tidal section by a group of concerned locals, the "Friends of Dartford and Crayford Creeks". As of mid-2016, a trust was being formed to promote regeneration and give formal recognition to the protection of this valuable public amenity.

== Dartford and Crayford Creek ==
Currently the tidal section is being furbished and improved by volunteers of "Friends of Dartford and Crayford Creek" to permit marine traffic, such as narrowboats and leisure cruisers to sail up to Steam Crane Wharf and beyond, to overnight or stay awhile. Much mud was laid down by river and tide from 1986 when the Creek was effectively abandoned. The tops of some mudbanks are now some two metres high; while others would need only minimal adjustment to accommodate the movement and docking of largish craft with no impact on the nature of the river. Work parties surveyed, cleared and removed hazardous debris from the river bed to permit safe passage of all types of craft during low water. Volunteers and lengthsmen removed a number of self-seeded trees, lopped others and removed debris from the banks. The trust (termed Dartford and Crayford Restoration Trust) is an offshoot of the Northfleet Harbour Restoration Trust.

== Boats in the Creek ==
In April 2015 a narrowboat arrived in Dartford Creek, with a crew of four canal skippers, to establish the feasibility of canal-boats visiting and by extension boats from the Medway, the non-tidal Thames and various sailing clubs along the Thames estuary. This was the first time in over forty years that a registered ship lay over in Dartford Creek.

Pentargon (SSR160910) returned in June 2015, familiarising more canalboat skippers, and stayed until October. Weeks of tide-waiting established a 'sailor's knowledge base' for future visits. During the period, the boat rested on a berm near the lock, accessible only at spring tides. Upon its departure, the feasibility of both creeks for access and dallying by a range of craft had been established.

Pentargon was the first boat to undertake an overnight stay in the creek with crew on board since the late 1970s. To facilitate her tying up on first arrival volunteers dug away forty years of neglect and inertia to provide a clean quayside and temporary mooring in the lock. This work was extended in 2016 by a volunteer lengthsman Hugh Nesbitt. who is an amateur archaeologist. In February 2016, Network Rail engineers removed trees at the top of Crayford Creek, re-establishing access to the "End of Navigation". Crayford Creek is considered capable of development for masted craft unable to proceed to Dartford because of the Bob Dunn Bridge.

Dartford library and museum provides a wealth of evidence that both creeks have been used for trade since pre-Roman times. Trade reached a modern zenith during the Industrial Revolution and beyond. In 1835, almost 60,000 long tons (61,000 t) were carried in or out, servicing and supporting considerable industrial activity. Navigational factors meant that single cargoes were limited to 50 long tons (51 t) even on spring tides. A ship canal was proposed in the early 1800s but failed to achieve momentum. In 1839 a new proposal achieved an Act of Parliament allowing development to proceed and tolls were levied from completion in 1844. The work included straightening, dredging and shortening the navigation.

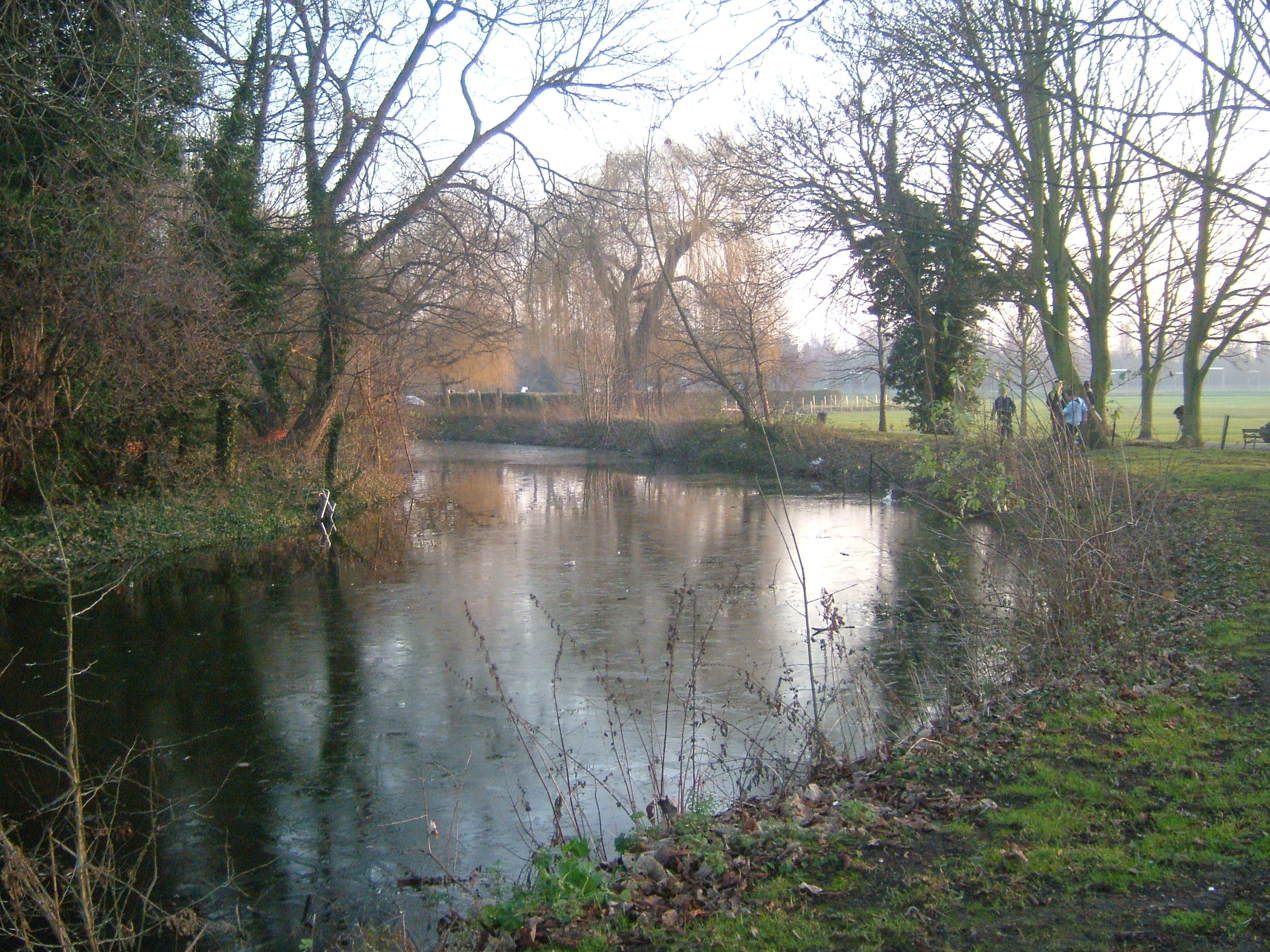
The Darent flowing through Central Park, Dartford

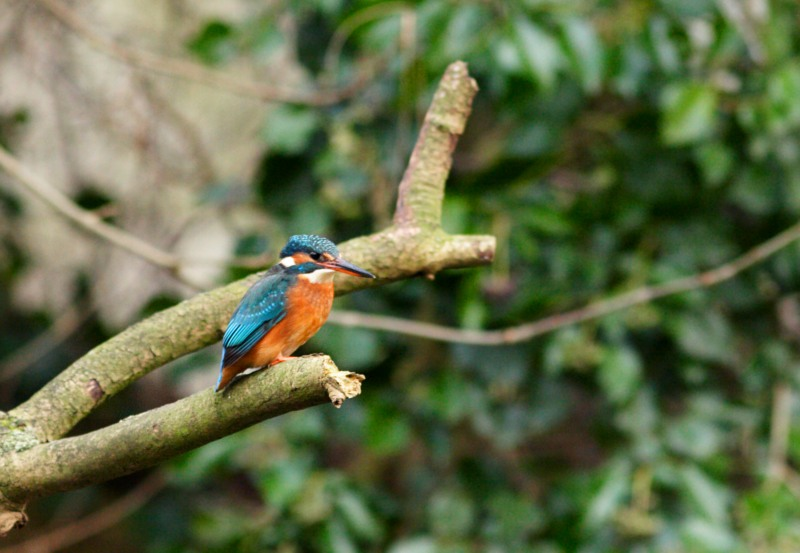
European kingfisher on the Darent at Lullingstone Castle

== Dartford Creek Tidal Flood Barrier ==
On Dartford Creek, close to its junction with the Thames, is the Dartford Creek Tidal Flood Barrier with two 160-tonne (160-long-ton) drop-leaf gates, which may be lowered if the sea threatens to inundate the land. The barrier is managed by the Environment Agency.

== Roman Connection ==
Dartford (Domesday Book "Tarentefort") was a major fording place on Watling Street. Research by Woodlands Junior School indicates that the ford existed even before the Roman period. Tarentefort itself flourished through the Roman period AD50 - AD 450. A ferry controlled by a hermit was established c.1235 and survived until 1518, long after the first bridge was constructed during the reign of Henry IV (1399–1413). That bridge survived into the 1700s.

== Historic and pre-historic ==
Today's river is not much more than a stream apart from in conditions of spate, a surprise given the breadth of the valley it runs through. The "proto-Darent" was much larger than today's trickle but the River Medway, through erosion of the soft chalk and clays of the North Downs/Western Weald, has captured much of the headwaters which once supplied the Darent.

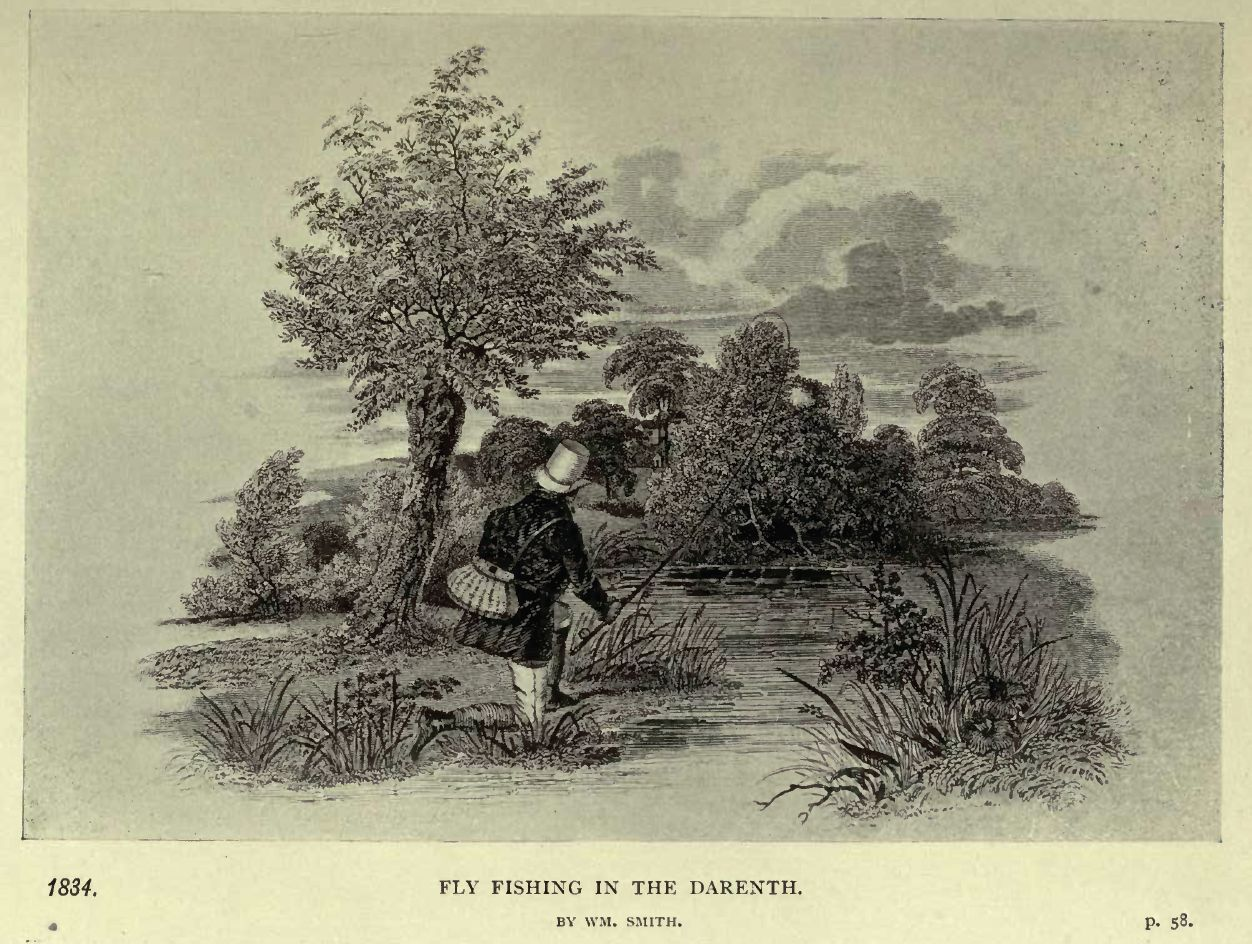
Fly fishing the Darent, c. 1834

== Watermills ==
The River Darent powered a number of watermills. From source to mouth they are:

=== Westerham (Elm View) Mill ===
TQ 444 537

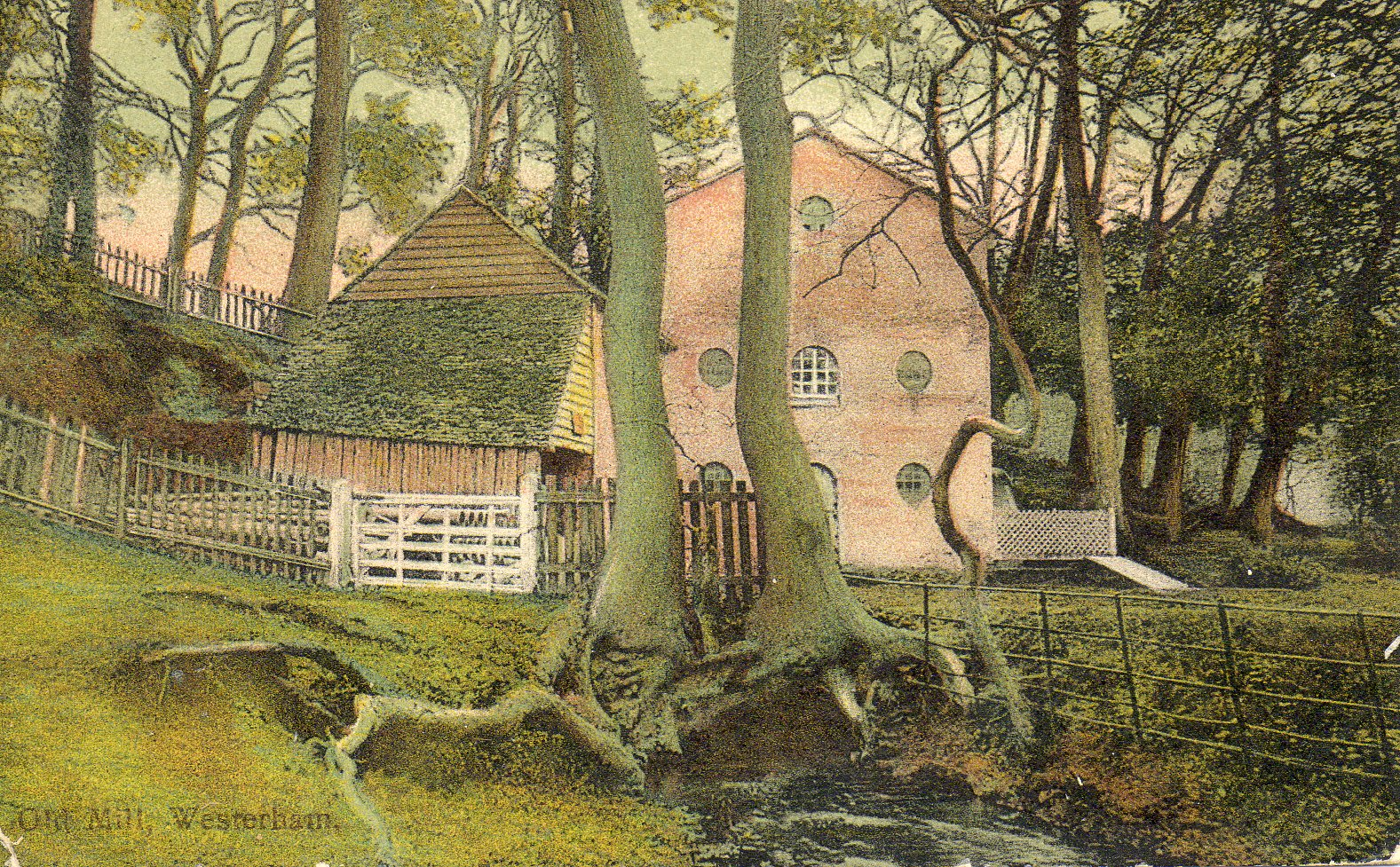
c. 1912

The miller at this corn mill in 1771 was James Marchane, who was joined by his son James. James Jr died in 1805 and James Sr died c. 1812. The mill was sketched by G. Samuel in 1818. It had an overshot waterwheel. The cast iron overshot waterwheel was 12 feet (3.66 m) by 2 feet 9.5 inches (0.85 m). It was fitted in 1868, replacing a wooden wheel which may have been breast shot. In 1890, the waterwheel was adapted to drive a set of pumps to supply Westerham. An average of 25,000 imperial gallons (110,000 L) could be supplied. The milling machinery was removed in 1936 and during the Second World War a doodlebug landed nearby and blew the roof of the mill off. The derelict building stood in April 1954, but had been demolished by July 1960.

=== Darenth (Tower Wood) Mill ===
TQ 449 540
This corn mill had an external cast iron overshot waterwheel carried on a wooden axle. The mill was working up to the outbreak of the First World War and demolished in the 1930s. It had two pairs of millstones.

=== Squerryes (Spring Shaw) Mill, Westerham ===
TQ 447 532
Squerryes, or Spring Shaw Mill was a corn mill with a cast iron overshot waterwheel some 9 or 10 feet (2.74 or 3.05 m) diameter and 3 feet (0.91 m) wide. The mill was marked as disused on the 1895 6" Ordnance Survey map. It was a small building of 17 feet 6 inches (5.33 m) square and had been demolished by 1955. Little is known of the machinery except that the upright shaft was wooden and of 11.5 inches (290 mm) diameter. The wooden great spur wheel was of compass arm construction.

=== Valence Pump, Brasted ===
TQ 461 535
This water powered pump was driven by a cast iron high breast shot waterwheel of 16 feet (4.88 m) by 3 feet 5 inches (1.04 m). A 6 feet (1.83 m) diameter cast iron spur geared pitwheel drove two ram pumps. The pump dated from 1858 and was still in existence in 1980.

=== Brasted Mill ===
TQ 470 552

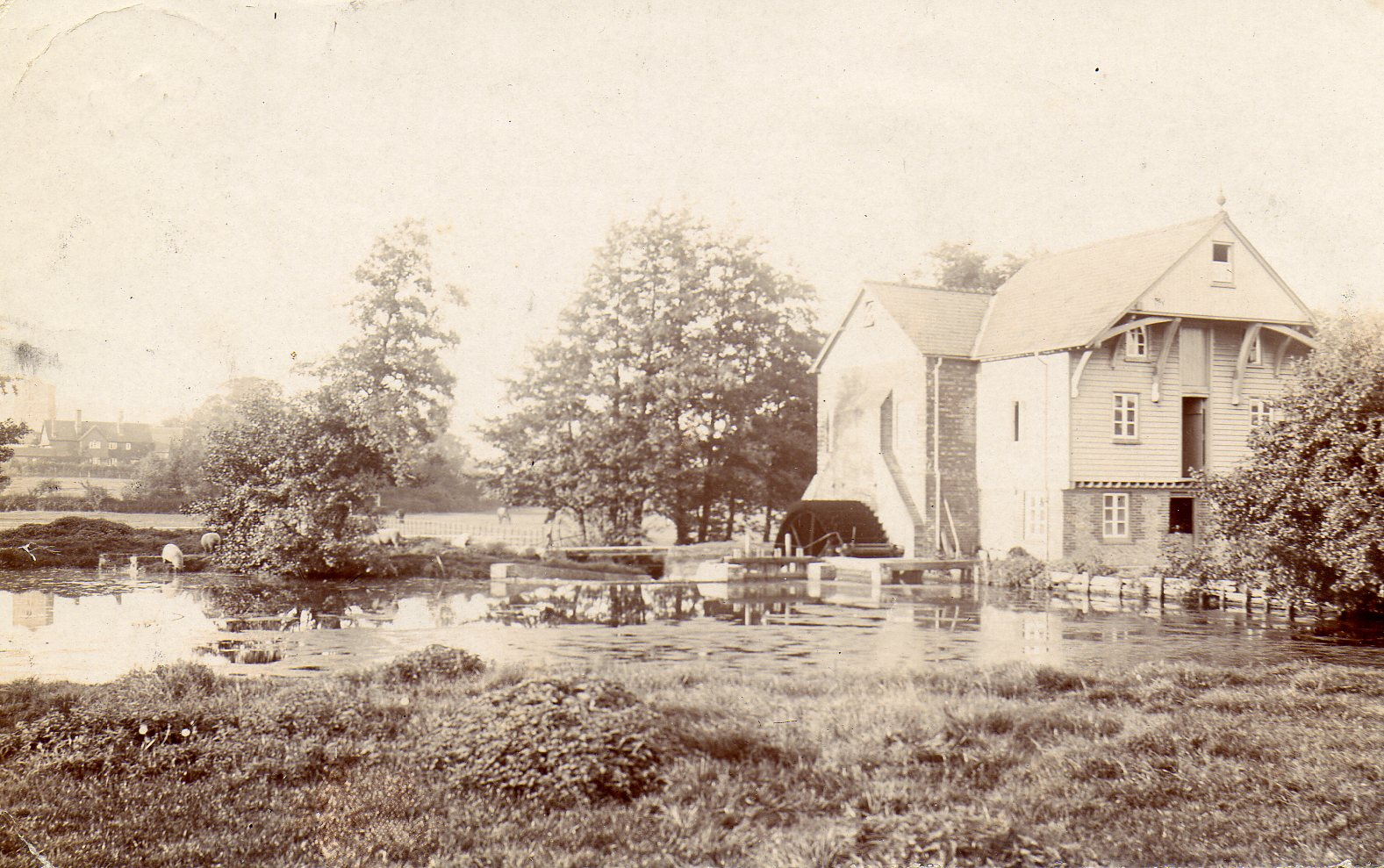
c. 1909

This was a corn mill, now converted to a dwelling. The cast iron breast shot waterwheel was 13 feet (3.96 m) by 6 feet 6 inches (1.98 m). In September 1812, James Weight, miller of Brasted, was claiming relief for himself, his wife and five children. A man by the name of Staples who went by the name of Chapman had leased the mill in Brasted in 1812; he claimed relief in January 1815. The mill ceased work in the 1920s and the machinery was removed c. 1934.

=== Sundridge Mill ===
TQ 489 556
This was a paper mill. In December 1822 Nicholas Tapsfield, papermaker of Sundridge was claiming relief for himself and his wife Mary. He had been apprenticed at a paper mill at East Malling. In December 1831, Thomas Green, papermaker of Sundridge was claiming relief for himself, his wife and five children. He had been apprenticed in 1804 to William Dacie at a paper mill in Bermondsey, then to a Mr Hall in St. Mary Cray when Dacie retired. In March 1832, Henry Sparks, papermaker of Sundridge was claiming relief for himself, wife Susanna and five children. He had been apprenticed to Messrs. Smith & Knight at Godalming in 1796, serving only four years. In May 1839, Henry Thomas, papermaker of Sundridge was claiming relief for himself. He had been a papermaker all his working life. The internal overshot waterwheel was 12 feet 6 inches (3.81 m) by 6 feet 3 inches (1.91 m), carried on an oak axle. Sundridge Mill produced paper for the Bank of England until its closure in 1901, business being transferred to Eynsford Paper Mill. The mill buildings were converted to a laundry, and the waterwheel was removed c. 1914 to be replaced by steam power. The mill was demolished in October 1969.

=== Chipstead Mill, Chevening ===
TQ 499 560
Chipstead Mill was a four-storey building which had been enlarged in the late 19th century. It worked until after the Second World War, but the machinery had been removed by 1950. The waterwheel was overshot and drove two pairs of French Burr millstones. A steam engine provided auxiliary power until it was replaced by a 75 horsepower (56 kW) suction gas engine. Roller milling plant had been installed in the 1890s but milling ceased in the 1920s. The mill building was standing in the 1980s.

=== Longford Mill, Dunton Green ===
TQ 513 568
This was a corn mill rebuilt by Weeks of Maidstone in 1859, it had an internal cast iron overshot waterwheel 7 feet (2.13 m) by 12 feet (3.66 m), which had probably replaced a breast shot waterwheel of larger diameter. The waterwheel drove three pairs of millstones. Electricity replaced water power between the wars, and the mill last worked in 1947. The stones of the mill were said to have been caused to run backwards at one time through the mill being bewitched. The mill drove three pairs of millstones, the machinery being mostly of cast iron. The mill building survived until 1987 when the site was redeveloped.

=== Otford Mill ===
TQ 524 594
There was a watermill in Otford in 1541. The last mill on this site was a corn mill with two waterwheels. It was latterly used as a saw mill and burnt down on 7 January 1924. A picture of the mill can be seen here. The breastshot waterwheel remained in 1930. One waterwheel was of wood construction, driving three pairs of French Burr millstones and one pair of Peak millstones. The machinery was all wooden. The second waterwheel was of cast iron, driving two pairs of French Burr stones vis cast iron machinery.

=== Upper Mill, Shoreham ===
TQ 520 610
This was a corn mill. Originally powered by an internal breast shot waterwheel of some 14 feet (4.27 m) by 6 feet (1.83 m) driving one pair of French Burr millstones and one pair of Peak millstones. The great spur wheel was a cast iron wheel with wooden cogs. The waterwheel had been replaced by a turbine which drove the millstones via a great spur wheel that was only 3 feet 3 inches (990 mm) diameter. The mill was house converted in 1971.

=== Lower (Shoreham Paper) Mill, Shoreham ===
TQ 520 621
This was the site of a fulling mill belonging to Palsters Manor. It was bought by the Passele family in the 14th century. The manor passed to Francis Sandbach in 1578 and was willed to John Polhill. He bought the fulling mill in 1602. The last mill on the site was a paper mill; it was demolished in 1936. The low breast shot waterwheel was 16 feet (4.88 m) by 8 feet (2.44 m). It drove machinery via a layshaft driven from the spur geared pitwheel. The mill was demolished in the 1930s. The paper mill had been run for over 200 years by the Wilmot family.

=== Wood Mill, Eynsford ===
TQ 531 648
Although it is said that this mill, which stood just downstream of Eynsford Bridge, was a corn mill with an undershot waterwheel other evidence shows this to have been a water powered saw mill which had been erected c. 1853. It may have stood on the site of an earlier mill.

=== Old Mill, Eynsford ===
TQ 540 656
This was a corn mill. It stands immediately downstream of the bridge by Eynsford ford. The low breast shot waterwheel was 8 feet (2.44 m) diameter in 1887, being replaced by one of at least 10 feet (3.05 m) diameter. It was 10 feet (3.05 m) wide. The millstones were only 3 feet (910 mm) diameter, suggesting that only a limited amount of flour was available. The mill was working until 1911, no auxiliary power being used. The building was house converted in the 1920s and survives today.

=== Eynsford Paper Mill ===
TQ 544 661
This paper mill was founded in 1648 by Huguenot refugees. The paper mill replaced an earlier corn mill. In 1882, it is recorded as having a waterwheel 18 feet 3 inches (5.56 m) by 8 feet (2.44 m). The mill suffered two fires in the 20th century but was rebuilt. It was working until 1952 but has now been demolished.

=== Farningham Mill ===
TQ 545 670
A mill has been on this site since Domesday. In the 15th century the mill was in the possession of the Roper family, Sir Anthony Roper being charged with "pulling down and allowing the watermill to decay and become uninhabited" in 1636. He was ordered to rebuild the mill within two years. The present building built by the Colyers dates to c.1780. The mill was a corn mill; the converted building survives. A curious feature is that the door on the north side of the east face is painted on, to look symmetrical with the real door. The mill was latterly worked by a turbine which drove a saw mill in its final years of operation. The mill last worked for trade in 1900.

=== Franks Generating Station, Horton Kirby ===
TQ 556 677
This installation was of the late 19th century. A turbine drove a generating plant to provide electricity to Franks Hall. After it ceased to be used, the turbine is said to have been installed in Westminster Mill.

=== Westminster Mill, Horton Kirby ===
TQ 560 685

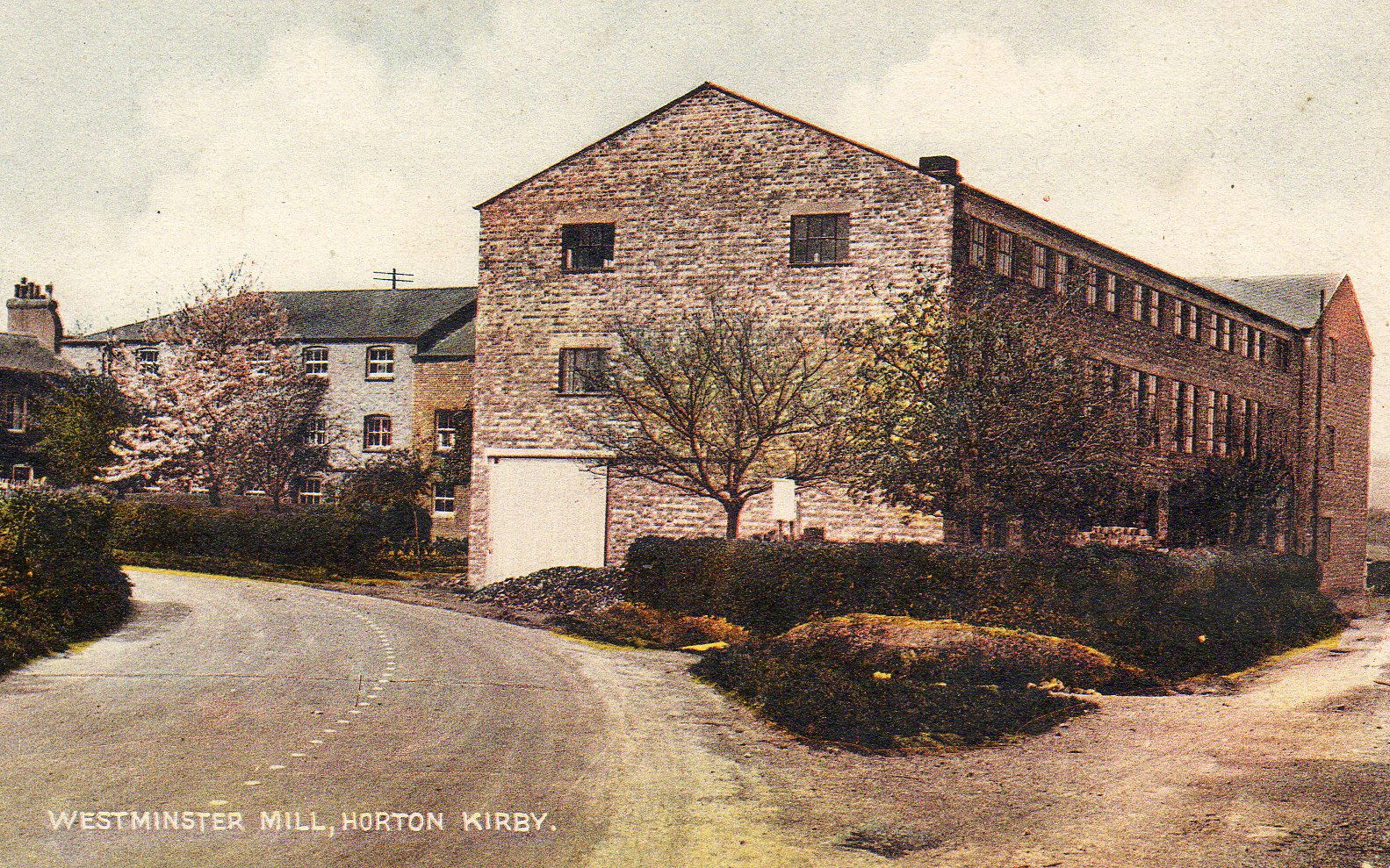
Westminster Mill

This was a corn mill which stood upstream of the paper mill. Henry Knight was a miller in Horton who died in 1724 and Thomas Welch was a miller in Horton who died in 1734. George Cannon took the mill in the early 1830s. In 1843 he was bankrupt as a common brewer, an occupation he carried on along with the mill. Ill health forced his retirement in 1852, and the mill was bought by his brother Stephen. His son, also Stephen, was running Old Mill from 1850, then being 14 years old. Stephen Cannon (father) died in 1872 and Stephen Cannon (son) sold Westminster Mill and Old Mill in order to concentrate the milling business at a mill in Bexley. Latterly the waterwheel was replaced by a turbine and the mill generated electricity. The mill burnt down when struck by lightning in 1908 and was rebuilt as a factory which made shoe laces. The factory closed down in 1991 and the mill has been demolished and the site redeveloped as housing.

=== Horton Kirby Paper Mill ===
TQ 563 695
This mill is under the viaduct of the Chatham Main Line railway. In 1700 there were two corn mills and a forge here. The mill was rebuilt by Henry Hall in 1820 as a paper mill. Paper from this mill was used to print The Sphere and The Tatler; photographs of the paper making process at the mill were used in the first edition of The Children's Encyclopedia. Henry Hall was the proprietor in 1840. An illustration of the machine house c.1880 can be seen here. The mill has a chimney 230 feet (70 m) high, which is a listed building. The mill was last used as a factory and closed in 2003, with plans being put forward for conversion to housing use in 2005. The chimney dates to 1880.

=== Frog Lane Mill, Sutton at Hone ===
TQ 559 696
This corn mill was of the 19th century. The cast iron breast shot waterwheel was 10 feet (3.05 m) by 6 feet (1.83 m) carried on a 5 inches (130 mm) square axle. An unusual feature of this mill was that the pitwheel was the same diameter as the waterwheel. The mill had ceased working by 1914. The upper storeys of the mill were demolished in February 1936, leaving the brick base, waterwheel and some machinery. These had been cleared away by June 1965.

=== South Darenth Mill ===
TQ 563 697
South Darenth Mill was a brick building that replaced an earlier mill that burnt down in 1879. This mill was run by the Cannon family. The mill had a cast iron waterwheel which drove three pairs of millstones. A steam engine provided auxiliary power. In 1894, roller milling plant was installed but milling ceased in 1905. The building was severely damaged in the Great Storm of 1987.

=== Darenth Paper Mill ===
TQ 558 714
Darenth Paper Mill was working until 1931 when it was taken over by Messrs Portals Ltd, of Laverstoke, Hampshire. In 1910, it was in the occupation of Messrs T H Saunders & Co Ltd, also at Hawley Mills and Beech and Rye Mills, High Wycombe, Buckinghamshire. The breast shot waterwheel was of cast iron with wooden floats. It was12 feet (3.66 m) by 10 feet (3.05 m).

=== Sutton (Old, Sutton at Hone, Darenth Corn, Little Darenth) Mill ===
TQ 557 713

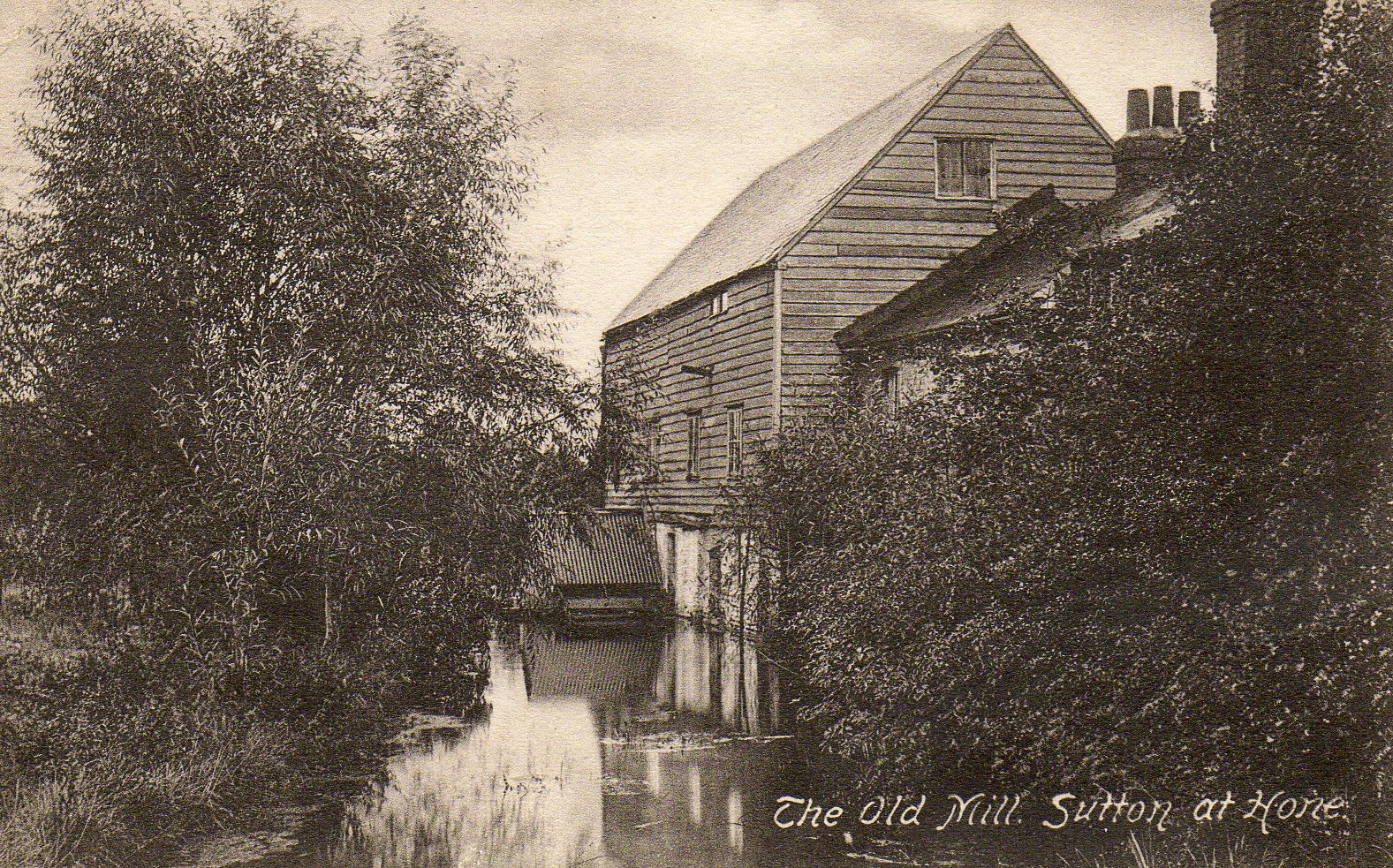
Old Mill

This corn mill stood at Old Mill Farm. It was built by Thomas Edmeads in the early 19th century. In 1806 the tenant millers were Stephen and George Cannon. The Cannon brothers were declared bankrupt in May 1816 but discharged their debts and returned to milling. George Cannon was again declared bankrupt in 1823. Stephen Cannon had three sons William, George and Stephen. They all learnt the milling trade at his mill.

Stephen Cannon later bought the mill and it passed to his daughter Harriet on his death on 27 February 1856. The mill remained in the Cannon family until 1872, and the mill house until 1888. Latterly the mill had a steam engine and a tall chimney. During the First World War, a bomb hit the mill, but did not explode, although the mill was put out of action. The mill was demolished in September 1928. Photographs of the mill during demolition reveal the cast iron low breast shot waterwheel drove three pairs of millstones via a cast iron layshaft. The original wooden upright shaft and crown wheel were retained.

=== Hawley Mills, Sutton at Hone ===
TQ 552 718
A site mentioned in Domesday, the mills here were held by the manor of Bignoures and belonged to the Knights of St. John in the Middle Ages, being let at a peppercorn rent to the Prioress of Dartford Nunnery. A wheat mill and a malt mill were released to one George Tasser in 1534. William Vaughan received them from the Crown in 1546 and the mills reverted to the Crown when he died in 1580. The two mills were granted to John Spilman (later Sir John Spilman) by the Crown in 1581.

In 1588, Spilman converted the corn mill into a paper mill, and obtained a monopoly for his paper by manipulating the favour and patronage of successive monarchs. Thomas Churchyard wrote a long poem in 1588, the first description of the papermaking process. Spielman employed 600 men, mainly Germans. The mills remained in the Spilman family until 1679, then a Mr Blackman was the owner in 1686 but he was bankrupt by 1739. Messrs. Pike and Edsall purchased the mill and converted it into a gunpowder mill.There were explosions here in 1745, 1790, 1795, 1796, 1799 and 1833. These killed at least forty people. Edsall went bankrupt in 1778 and the mills were purchased by Messrs Pigou and Andrews. The mill was a papermill by 1840, when William Wiggins was the owner.

The malt mill was not required by Spilman, and he leased it to Godfrey Box of Liège. He erected an iron rolling and slitting mill (for the manufacture of nails; the first in England) between 1590 and 1595, which by 1758 had two waterwheels, one working the upper roller, the other working the lower rollers and a guillotine. A company of "white paper makers" was established here in 1694 and during the 18th century the mill was owned by a Mr Quelch.

=== Dartford Powder Mills ===
Approximately TQ 548 728
The Powder Mills were in operation from c. 1730, possibly on the site of Spilman's paper mill of 1588. It was in operation until the 20th century.

=== Lower Paper Mill, Dartford ===
TQ 547 732
Lower Mill was built in the mid-17th century, and closed in 1790. Later it was used as a zinc rolling mill and a printing works for silk and calico.

=== Victoria Mills, Dartford ===
TQ 545 739

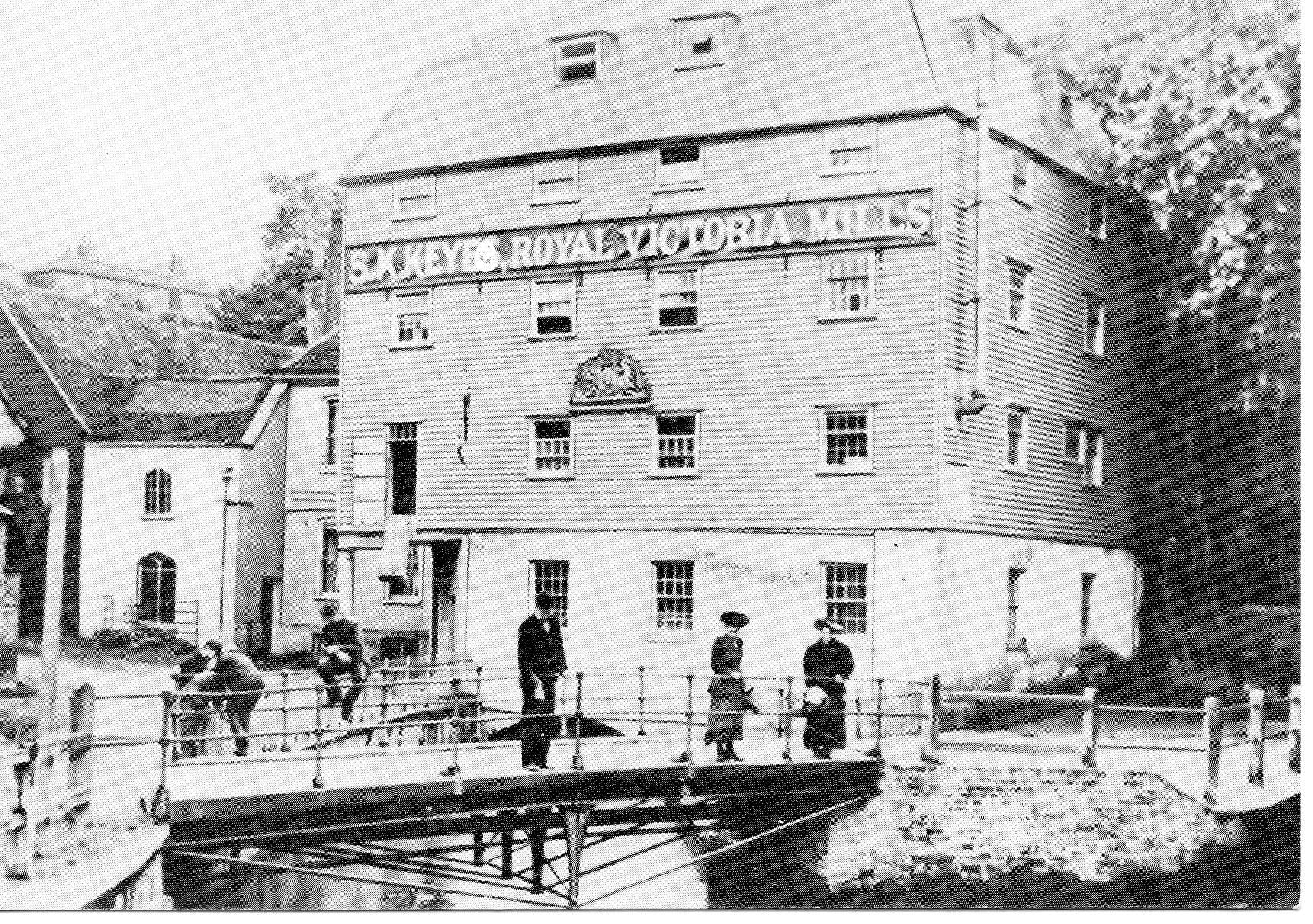
c. 1900

Victoria Mills stood on the site of a 15th-century fulling mill and an old wire mill, mentioned by William Lambarde in 1570 as a glazing mill. This was used for polishing armoured plate. In the early 19th century there were three mills here; an oil mill, a mustard mill and a corn mill in the late 18th century it was owned by a Mr Fomereau and worked by the Loder family. The corn mill was a four-storey wood structure built in 1790. In the early 19th century, miller James Hard was appointed miller to King George IV. It had a wrought iron breast shot waterwheel of 20' diameter driving four pairs of millstones.

=== Colyers (Orchard's, Bridge, Acacia Hall) Mill, Dartford ===
TQ 544 739
In 1217 King John granted a mill worth 100/- a year, situated in Dartford to Michael de Wallensi and in 1221 William, Prior of Rochester, granted to Alan Martel, Prior of the Knights Templar, half an acre of land by the mill. The mill belonged to the Bishop of Rochester in 1253 and in 1299 was known as Orchard's mill, being then privately owned. Henry Colyer was the miller in 1840. The mill was later run by R & H Strickland Ltd, although milling ceased in 1893 and the building was stripped of its machinery, including a large cast iron waterwheel and a steam engine, in 1898. It then served as a social club for Messrs Burroughs Wellcome & Co. The mill burnt down on 24 January 1962.

=== Silk Printing Works, Dartford ===
TQ 544 743
There was a silk printing works in Dartford which is said to have been powered by a waterwheel. It was said that the waterwheel had been "recently removed" in 1986 as part of a clearance programme for the section of river that the works stood on.

=== Phoenix Mill, Dartford ===
TQ 544 745
This was the furthermost mill on the Darent. About 1650 one John Brown erected a "brassell" mill for splitting iron into rods and nails. Nicholas Tooke owned the mill in 1656 followed by Charles Mauum from 1687 to 1719 and then Messrs. Cooke and Coolson in 1779. The brassell mill gave way to a saw mill, then in 1790 a seven-storey cotton mill was built. This burnt down in 1795 and a smaller building, the Phoenix Mill was erected in 1797. George Willding was the miller and Messrs Saunders and Harrison were mustard makers here in 1840. T H Saunders rebuilt it in 1855. William Masters was a workman here until his death in 1873, and has a memorial in Horton Kirby church. It was a paper mill and closed in 1889.

== Tributaries ==
Various tributaries feed into the River Darent. They also powered a number of watermills.

=== Stream at Brasted ===
==== Mill Farm Mill, Brasted ====
TQ 468 554
Mill Farm Mill may have been built in 1705, which is the date of the Mill House. It was worked by the Smith family, ceasing work c. 1858. The 14 feet (4.27 m) by 3 feet (0.91 m) cast iron waterwheel and machinery were removed before the First World War. The building was standing in 1954, converted to a garage.

=== Stream at Chevening ===
==== Whitley (Dibden) Mill, Chevening ====
TQ 508 533
This mill stood deep in woodland west of Sevenoaks. It was held by Ralph Bosville of Bradbourne Manor in the 16th century. The mill was in existence until at least the mid-19th century but had ceased working by 1900. The overshot waterwheel of composite construction was carried on a wooden axle 9 feet 6 inches (2.90 m) long and 18 inches (460 mm) square at the waterwheel, 12 inches (300 mm) diameter in the mill. The mill was in ruins by the 1920s

=== Stream at Ightham ===
==== Ightham Mill ====
A tributary rising near St. Cleres is reputed to have driven a watermill, possibly the one at Ightham recorded in 1322 as the property of William Inge.

==== Kemsing Mill ====
TQ 543 586
This mill was on the tributary that drove the mill at Ightham. Kemsing is reputed to be the site of a Roman watermill at Springhead, which was excavated in 1949.

=== Greatness Stream ===
==== Greatness Mill, Sevenoaks ====
An old mill site, in 1381 a mill at Gretnarsche was in the possession of John Colepeper. The mills were later in the ownership of the Fane/Vane family, being known as "Gretness-mylls" in the 1550s, being two water corn mills. John Thorpe (miller?) was living at Greatness Mill at the time of his death in 1835. The building is of weatherboard on a steel frame on a brick base, replacing an earlier mill that burnt down after the First World War. The overshot waterwheel was 20 feet (6.10 m) by 4 feet 6 inches (1.37 m). It drove two pairs of French Burr millstones and one pair of Peak millstones. Roller milling plant had been fitted by 1906. In 1927, the mill was still worked by water power, aided by a 15 horsepower (11 kW) gas engine.

==== Greatness Silk Mill, Sevenoaks ====
TQ 535 570
This mill was built in 1761 by Peter Nouaille, who came into the possession of the manorial watermill on marrying Elizabeth de la Mare of Greatness. It stood downstream of the corn mill. Nouaille went bankrupt in 1778 but recovered, employing 100 people when he retired in 1800. The mill had a breastshot waterwheel. It closed down after Nouaille's death c. 1828. The mills were immortalised in the poem Ode on the Silk Mills at Greatness by Joseph Harrison.

=== Guzzlebrook ===
==== Childs Bridge Mill, Kemsing ====
TQ 545 580
A long lost mill site, thought to have been a corn mill. The mill pond was some 400 yards (370 m) by 50 yards (46 m) in extent.

==== Longlodge Mill, Otford ====
TQ 531 584
Possibly the site of one of Otford's eight Domesday mills. The mill was abandoned at an early date as it was not remembered in field names.

=== Stream at Bradbourne ===
==== Bradbourne Mill, Sevenoaks ====
This was a corn mill. On 24 October 1545 Bradbourne Mill was granted by Henry VIII to William Darkenolde for 21 years at £6.13s.4d per annum. The King finding the timber for the repair of the mill. In 1557, Ralph Bosville bought the mill. In 1592, Henry Bosville died, leaving his manor of Bradbourne, and a "water grist mill" in the tenure of Richard Phillipes and a "Sythe Mill" in the occupation of Chapman amongst his property.

=== Cranpit Stream ===
==== Hall's Engineering Works, Dartford ====
TQ 542 745
Millwright John Hall built a cast iron waterwheel to replace a windmill that powered some of the machinery at his workshops in Hythe Street, Dartford.

== Fords ==
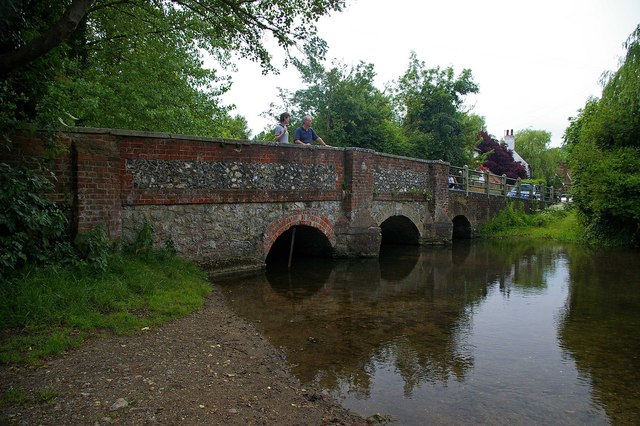
Shoreham Bridge and the disused ford

There were a number of fords on the River Darent.

=== Shoreham ===
TQ 5205 6165 51°19′59″N 0°10′59″E
There was a ford by the bridge in the village.

=== Eynsford ===
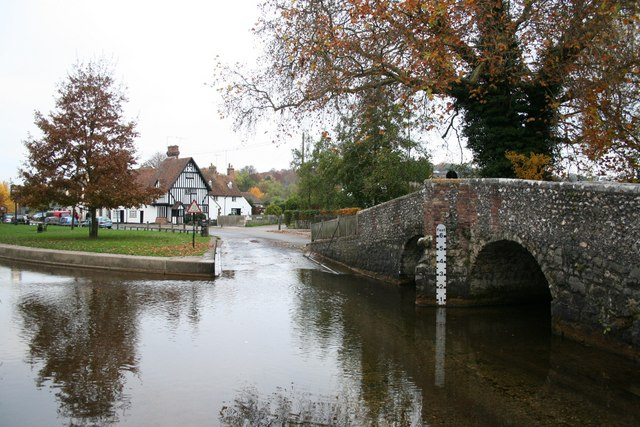
The still usable ford at Eynsford

TQ 539 655 51°22′03″N 0°12′43″E
Eynsford is famous for its ford by the old packhorse bridge.

=== Farningham ===
There was a ford at Farningham, now replaced by a bridge.

=== Dartford ===
There was a ford in Dartford in Roman times, Dartford being a conflation of Darent-ford. The ford was still in existence in 1840.

== See also ==
- Tributaries of the River Thames
- List of rivers in England
- Darent Valley Path
- Lengthsman

| Next confluence upstream | River Thames | Next confluence downstream |
| Mardyke (north) | River Darent | Bill Meroy Creek (north) |
