= South Darenth =

Village in Kent, England

Coordinates: 51.403°N 0.245°E

- Location within Kent
- Civil parish: Horton Kirby and South Darenth
- District: Sevenoaks
- Shire county: Kent
- Region: South East
- Country: England
- Sovereign state: United Kingdom
- Post town: DARTFORD
- Postcode district: DA4
- Dialling code: 01322
- Police: Kent
- Fire: Kent
- Ambulance: South East Coast
- UK Parliament: Sevenoaks

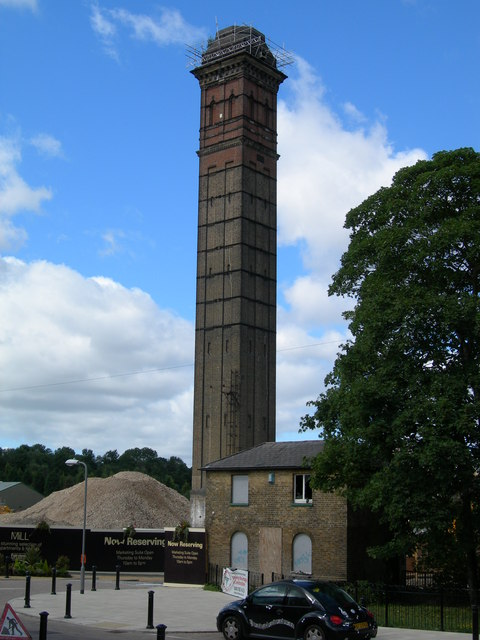
Chimney, South Darenth - geograph.org.uk - 919320

South Darenth is a village in the civil parish of Horton Kirby and South Darenth in the Sevenoaks District of Kent, England. It is located 4.2 miles (6.8 km) east of Swanley and 4.4 miles (7.1 km) south of Dartford.

== History ==
The village history is relatively recent as it was developed around the Horton Kirby mill, originally built in 1820 by Henry Hall. Before the mill there were only a few farms and some small cottages for workers, as well as a forge. The mill was at first a flour mill, which employed a handful of local people.

Some years later the site was expanded and converted into a paper mill which took up a much larger area, and included a small tunnel through which the River Darent was diverted. The paper produced was said to be a good quality, used for magazines and plans.

Towards the end of the 19th century the mill further expanded, with a boiler house and large chimney built in 1881. In 1918 an extra 70 ft of circular stock was added to the chimney made of mostly red brick to ensure that emissions escaped from the valley. The chimney is now Grade II listed.

Accommodation was needed for the workers, so small terraced houses were built close by. The mill ceased operating in February 2003 and has since been redeveloped extensively for housing. A Co-op Food supermarket is located in one of the listed mill buildings.

South of the village is the Chatham Main Line, which runs between London and the East Kent coast. The viaduct, built in 1859-60, has 10 arches each approximately 10 metres wide and 20 metres in height. Arch 2 goes over a footpath where arch 3 spans across the Horton road, the 6th across the River Darent and the 8th over a small road leading to an industrial estate. The viaduct was designed by Victorian architect Joseph Cubitt, known for designing the original Blackfriars Railway Bridge in London. It was built by teams of Irish navvies for the London, Chatham & Dover Railway. Farningham Road station to the west of the village was opened in December 1860. A signal box was constructed in 1886. The station previously had some sidings, as well as a water tank, which was removed in 1939.

At the end of the 20th century there were protests about the proposed High Speed 1 rail line passing close to the village, including a new viaduct parallel to the existing line. The planned line was later diverted away from the area into Thurrock.

The Farningham home for little boys was located south of the village, and organised on the ‘cottage homes’ principle. In 1866 the foundation stone for the new buildings was laid by the Prince of Wales, and the home was opened the next year by the Earl of Shaftesbury.

Its chapel (standing on high ground) once had a spire but was destroyed in the Great Storm of 1987. The home was officially closed in 1961 and saw various educational uses until its reopening as a retirement village in 1978.

== The fire station ==
The village had a fire station for over 100 years. It first served the paper mill with a small truck, in case of a fire in the mill. After a few years a small fire station was built in the centre of the village which served local communities with a horse and cart. As the villages grew, so did the crew, and new appliances were acquired. The fire crew had a wide presence in the community, visiting schools and local youth groups as well as attending village fetes.

The station had been threatened two times before its eventual closure. The first proposal led to protests with wide community support, which helped secure the station’s survival for the following 30 years. In 2012, Kent Fire and Rescue Service proposed to close the station. Meetings were held between local communities and KFRS, and thousands signed a petition in opposition to the closure. After more than a century of firefighting in the area the station was closed due to budget cuts at the end of 2013. The event was marked by a ceremony attended by local residents and councillors.

== Transport ==
The A225 road between Dartford and Sevenoaks passes to the west of South Darenth, on the opposite side of the River Darent. The M20 and M25 motorways can both be accessed via the Swanley Interchange, approximately 3.5 miles from South Darenth.

The closest National Rail station to South Darenth is Farningham Road on the Chatham Main Line, located approximately 0.6 miles away. The station is served by hourly Southeastern services between London Victoria and Gillingham via Bromley South.

The village is served by the Kent Country route 414 which provides hourly connections to Horton Kirby, Sutton-at-Hone, Hawley and Dartford.

== See also ==
- Darenth
