= Istead Rise =

Coordinates: 51.406°N 0.352°E

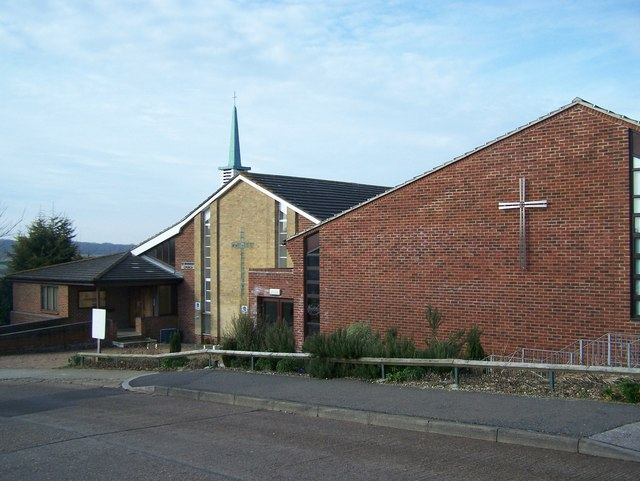
- St Barnabas Church

- Location within Kent
- Population: 3,437 (2011.ward)
- OS grid reference: TQ636700
  - Charing Cross: 25 mi (40 km) WNW
- District: Gravesham
- Shire county: Kent
- Region: South East
- Country: England
- Sovereign state: United Kingdom
- Post town: GRAVESEND
- Postcode district: DA13
- Dialling code: 01474
- Police: Kent
- Fire: Kent
- Ambulance: South East Coast
- UK Parliament: Gravesham
- Website: https://www.ircatoday.com

Istead Rise is a estate in the borough of Gravesham in Kent, England, 3 miles (5 km) south of Gravesend. It had a population of 3,437 at the 2011 Census.

The name of the estate is not an ancient one; it first appears as a road-name on the Ordnance Survey 25" map of 1907. At that time Istead Rise was the only road in the region and led to Frog's Island at its western end. The name may be connected to a field-name, Highstead, appearing as plot 690 on the Northfleet tithe award of 1838.

By road, it is 23 miles (37 km) east of London on the A2 road. The nearest railway station is 1.7 miles (3 km) away at Meopham (34 minutes from London Victoria). Istead Rise is 3.7 miles (6 km) from Ebbsfleet International for Eurostar services to Paris, Brussels and Lille. Southeastern commuter trains run on the high-speed track to London St Pancras (16 minutes away), stopping only at Stratford International.

St Barnabas Church (Church of England), founded in 1957, is located near the shops.

There is a small parade of shops with an Indian restaurant, fish and chip shop, butcher, pharmacy, Co-op and dry cleaner. On Lewis Road there are a hairdresser and dentist. There is a GP surgery on Worcester Close.

Istead Rise community centre was destroyed by a fire started during a burglary on 20 March 2007. The centre was re-built and opened again on 17 December 2008.

Some people who reside in Istead Rise, wrongly call this a village. It is and always has been, an estate.
