= Vigo Village =

Village in Kent, England

Coordinates: 51.329°N 0.348°E

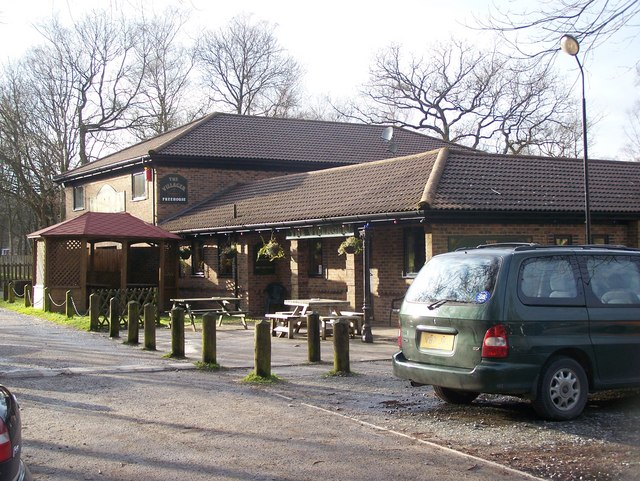
- The Villager pub

- Location within Kent
- Population: 2,065 (2011)
- OS grid reference: TQ635615
- Civil parish: Vigo
- District: Gravesham
- Shire county: Kent
- Region: South East
- Country: England
- Sovereign state: United Kingdom
- Post town: Gravesend
- Postcode district: DA13
- Dialling code: 01732
- Police: Kent
- Fire: Kent
- Ambulance: South East Coast
- UK Parliament: Gravesham

Vigo Village /ˈvaɪɡoʊ/ is a village and (as simply Vigo) a civil parish in the Gravesham district in Kent, England. It takes its name from a 15th-century public house, which was renamed in the 18th century after the Battle of Vigo Bay. While a nearby hamlet named Vigo was recorded on an 18th-century map, the present village was built in the mid-20th century, on a site that was previously a disused World War II army camp. The civil parish was created on 1 April 2000 from the parish of Meopham.

The village is situated in the middle of chestnut woodland at the top of the North Downs, east of the road between Gravesend and Wrotham. Trosley Country Park lies immediately south of the village and forms part of the North Downs Area of Outstanding Natural Beauty. In the 2001 census Vigo civil parish had a population of 2,201, reducing to 2,065 at the 2011 Census.

== History ==
The Vigo Inn is reputed to date from 1471. It was renamed after the Battle of Vigo Bay, a naval battle fought in 1702 during the War of the Spanish Succession. An apocryphal story suggests that the inn was renamed by a man who bought it with the proceeds of war prizes gained during the battle.

Little is recorded about the area until the 1870s when Sir Sidney Waterlow purchased large areas of land including the village of Fairseat, a good proportion of Stansted, and land from Wrotham to Meopham. The parts of the estate were linked by a small bridge bearing the family crest over Trottiscliffe Road, which is still in evidence today. In 1887 he built Trosley Towers on the crest of the escarpment to the east of Trottiscliffe Road. It was approached by two drives and surrounded by wooded grounds. Other private drives were constructed, one of which is Hamilton Drive which still survives in Trosley Towers Country Park and runs from the site of the old house to Commority Road.

Sir Sidney died in 1906 and the estate passed to his son Sir Philip. When he died in 1931 the estate was sold off. Some of the houses, such as Pilgrims House at the bottom of Trottiscliffe Road, were bought by tenants. Trosley Towers and the woodlands were sold to Mr E. E. Shahmoon in 1935. During this time chalets were built in the area. In 1936 Mr Shahmoon had Trosley Towers demolished and built Hamilton Lodge and adjoining stables. One story suggests that the Lodge and stables were built to accommodate the Shah of Persia and his racehorses on his visits to England.

=== Second World War ===
In 1942 the area was taken over by the army. With the outbreak of war and the subsequent increase in size of the army, there was a need for large numbers of suitable candidates to train as officers. This training normally took place at an Officer Cadet Training Unit (OCTU) which was attached to the arm of the service in which the cadet would eventually serve. There were several OCTUs and therefore duplication of resources occurred and standards varied from unit to unit, so in the early part of 1942 it was decided to standardise the basic training and send all potential officer cadets to a pre-OCTU for up to eight weeks, before their attendance at their specialist OCTU. With a few exceptions, all officer cadets were required to attend the newly formed pre-OCTU Wrotham Camp, which was situated on what is now the site of Vigo Village. Training areas extended northwards through all of Happy Valley, almost to Meopham, and south to farmland beyond the Pilgrims Way. The site handled the majority of officers for the British Army for the next four years, handling up to 10,000 men at any one time.

The new camp was formed and administered by the 148th Independent Brigade Group, which became known as the 148th Training Brigade. Hamilton Lodge became the brigade's headquarters. Permanent staff and instructors who lived in the area were allowed to return home at evenings and weekends whilst the remainder were either accommodated on the site or billeted in Meopham or Wrotham. Cadets were housed in Nissen huts. Training consisted of lectures and demonstrations in a variety of subjects, tactics, map reading, field craft, camouflage and the operation of a variety of weapons including grenades and mortars. Field craft areas close to the camp were in 'Happy Valley' and night exercises took place in and around Luddesdown, Pilgrims Way, Addington and Ryarsh with a rifle range in the chalk pit, an assault course at the bottom of the escarpment and mortar and grenade ranges to the south of the Pilgrims Way. All instruction regarding vehicles was done at the D Wing [Driving and Maintenance]. The Wing had a large transport column of vehicles from 15cwt. trucks to 10 ton recovery vehicles plus hundreds of motor-cycles. The main motor pool was situated on what is now Vigo Rugby Club and motor cycle training was undertaken on a figure of eight course in the area of what is now Highview.

The camp continued to operate through to the early part of 1946 (the decision to abolish the brigade was taken on 8 April). Today little is left of what was at one time the largest pre-OCTU in the world. Only the outlines of some of the foundations in the surrounding woods, a concrete platform at the top of the escarpment which was a map reading point and a crumbling assault course wall at the bottom of the escarpment are now visible. Only one building remains, with its large, rusting double doors, it is situated behind Vigo School and was one of the motor transport garages. The only other reminder left today is in the name of one of the roads running through the village, Erskine Road, named after the Commanding Officer of the 148 Training Brigade from January 1943, and the Brigade HQ, Hamilton Lodge, on the Harvel Road.

=== Post war ===
With the departure of the army in 1946, the area was occupied by people who, for the most part, had lost everything during the Blitz. Here they found ready-made accommodation (in the form of Nissen Huts) and well-made roads, and soon a community formed. The presence of about 1000 people in the area prompted the councils of Strood, Gravesend, West Malling and Northfleet to improve conditions for the inhabitants: roads were improved, toilets installed, and the huts partitioned to provide three rooms. The council charged rent and the settlement became known as Vigo Village.

The old camp lecture hall, Erskine Hall (on what is now the School field), was still standing and served the community in a variety of forms and at one point it was used as a storage facility for props from the London Palladium.

A bus service was started along with a shopping centre, known as Piccadilly Circus. There was a library in Erskine Hall, and a doctor's surgery in Henley Street nearby.

The stables at the back of Hamilton Lodge were used as a primary school from about 1948. Before this children attended Meopham and Culverstone schools. A scout group, the 17th Gravesend, was also started and run by the Church Army.

To the east of the site, on what was the old army motorcycle training course (now the area of Highview), was a caravan site.

By the late 1950s many of the residents were re-housed in nearby areas and the land was cleared to a certain extent. The land was then sold by Mr Shahmoon to Croudace Ltd, a property development company.

A purpose built primary school opened in 1972. A shopping centre was also built and the Villager pub opened in 1985.

== Transport ==
Vigo is served by buses to Sevenoaks and Gravesend.
