= Crook Log =

Coordinates: 51.459°N 0.128°E

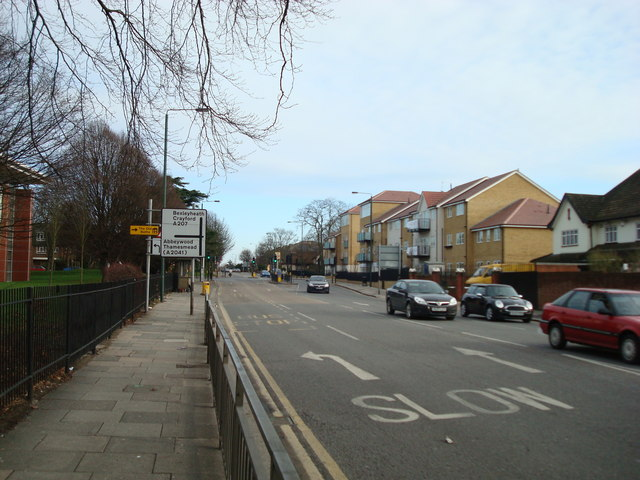
- Crook Log, looking east into Bexleyheath. "The Old Baths" apartment complex is on the right.

- Location within Greater London
- OS grid reference: TQ478755
  - Charing Cross: 11 mi (18 km)
- London borough: Bexley
- Ceremonial county: Greater London
- Region: London
- Country: England
- Sovereign state: United Kingdom
- Post town: BEXLEYHEATH
- Postcode district: DA6, DA7
- Post town: WELLING
- Postcode district: DA16
- Dialling code: 020
- Police: Metropolitan
- Fire: London
- Ambulance: London
- UK Parliament: Bexleyheath and Crayford
- London Assembly: Bexley and Bromley

Crook Log is a locality around Watling Street (A207) within the London Borough of Bexley. It lies at the western edge of Bexleyheath along the boundary with Welling. All three places merge with no clear separation points. Crook Log is approximately 10.9 miles (17.5 km) east south-east of Charing Cross, the traditional centre of London. Key landmarks are the Crook Log Inn, now a licensed restaurant, on the southern side of the A207 and a sports centre on the northern side. In 2005 the Crook Log leisure centre was expanded to include an eight–lane 25 metre indoor swimming pool, a teaching pool and changing facilities. The new centre was opened by Queen Elizabeth II on 26 July 2005. An existing and long established swimming pool across the road, at that time known as Splashworld, was then demolished. The site was redeveloped with 52 apartments and the complex was named "The Old Baths". Other nearby public amenities include a youth centre and an adult education centre. Also in the area are Crook Log Primary School and The Crook Log guest house. An amateur theatre called the Edward Alderton Theatre is in Crook Log. World heavyweight boxing champion Lennox Lewis was a former resident of this area.

== History ==
In 1895, the only buildings in Crook Log, besides a roadside inn, were several large residential villas. The villas were estimated at the time to be no more than 50 years old. The public house, referred to as 'The Crook Log' was much older, dating from at least 1808, and possibly earlier still, as a building of that name appears in a 1738 document.

== Education ==
Crook Log Primary School is the only school in Crook Log.

For further nearby schools see the main London Borough of Bexley article

== Politics and government ==
Crook Log is part of the Bexleyheath and Crayford constituency for elections to the House of Commons of the United Kingdom, currently represented by Daniel Francis from the Labour Party.

Crook Log is part of the Crook Log ward for elections to London Borough of Bexley.
