= Horton Kirby =

Village in Kent, England

Coordinates: 51.389980°N 0.252050°E

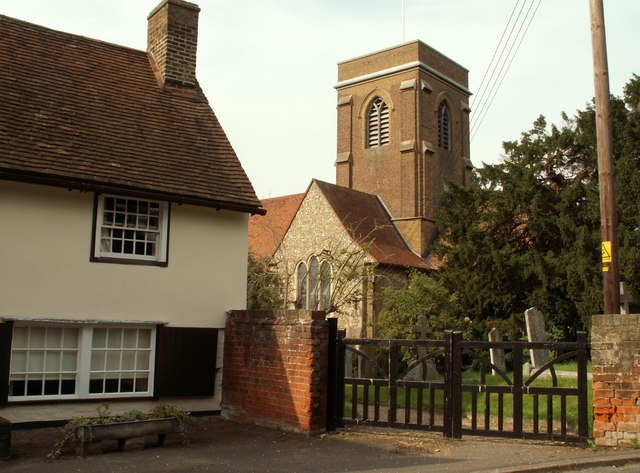
- St Mary the Virgin Church

- Location within Kent
- Civil parish: Horton Kirby and South Darenth
- District: Sevenoaks
- Shire county: Kent
- Region: South East
- Country: England
- Sovereign state: United Kingdom
- Post town: DARTFORD
- Postcode district: DA4
- Dialling code: 01322
- Police: Kent
- Fire: Kent
- Ambulance: South East Coast
- UK Parliament: Sevenoaks

Horton Kirby is a village in the Sevenoaks District of Kent, England. It is located 3.9 miles east of Swanley & 4.9 miles south of Dartford. Together with the nearby village of South Darenth, it forms the Horton Kirby and South Darenth civil parish.

== Heritage ==
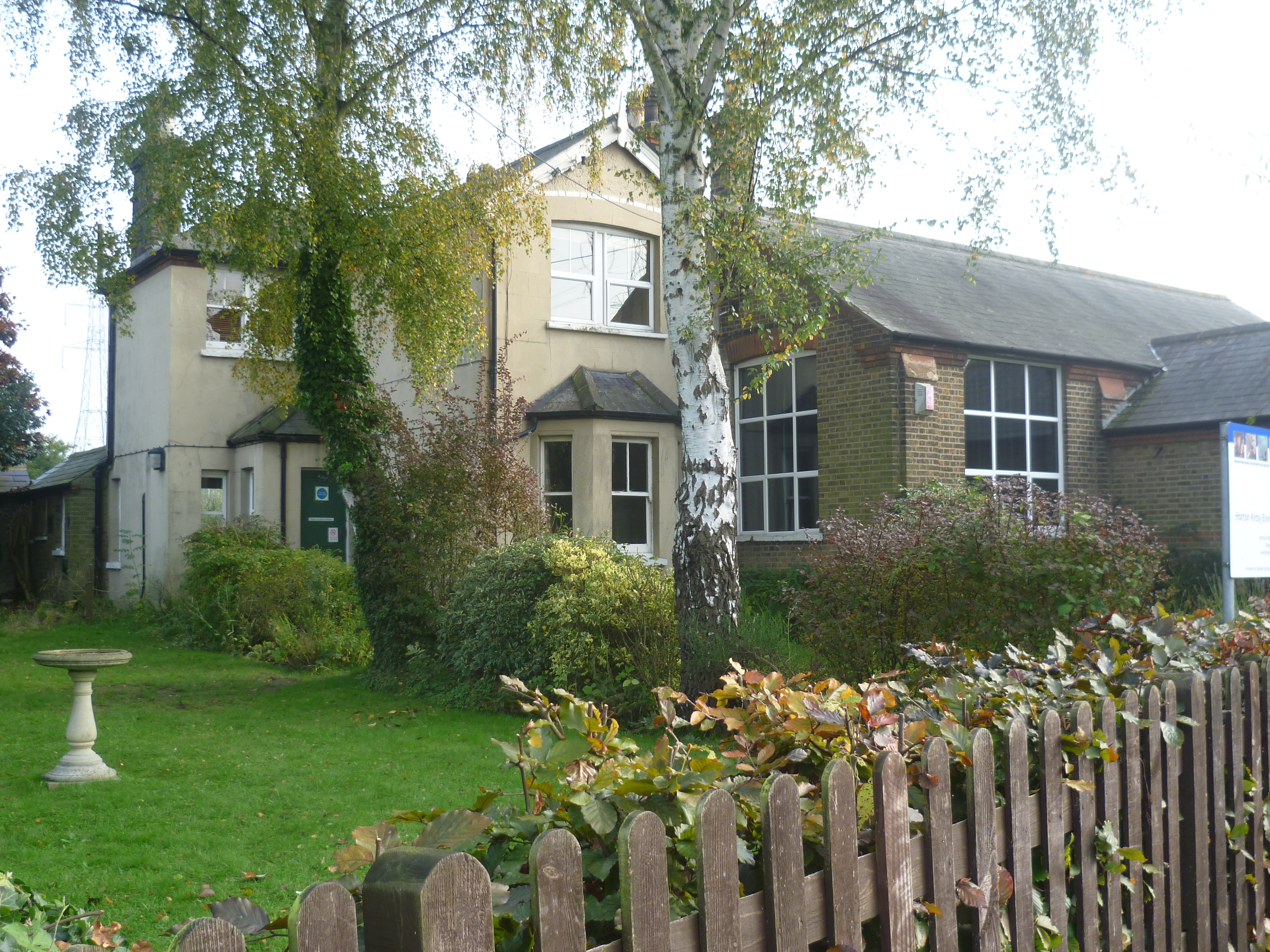
Environmental Studies Centre

Horton Kirby Environmental Studies Centre provides nature and country life-related outdoor activities for schoolchildren from South London.

Remains of a Roman villa were discovered in 1972 on the Westminster Field recreation ground, just across the Darent from the village. The discovery was made when new main sewage drains were being dug. The extra costs of diverting these to save the villa were met by public subscription, with fund-raising help from local schoolchildren. The remains include those of a Roman granary at least 100 ft in length and 60 ft wide. The site was back-filled after preservation work was completed.

== Transport ==
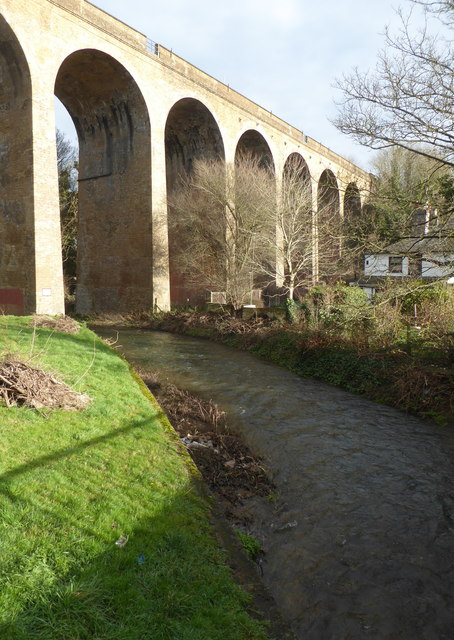
Viaduct by the Darent

The A225 road between Dartford and Sevenoaks passes to the west of Horton Kirby, on the opposite side of the River Darent. The M20 and M25 motorways can both be accessed via the Swanley Interchange, approximately 3.5 miles from Horton Kirby.

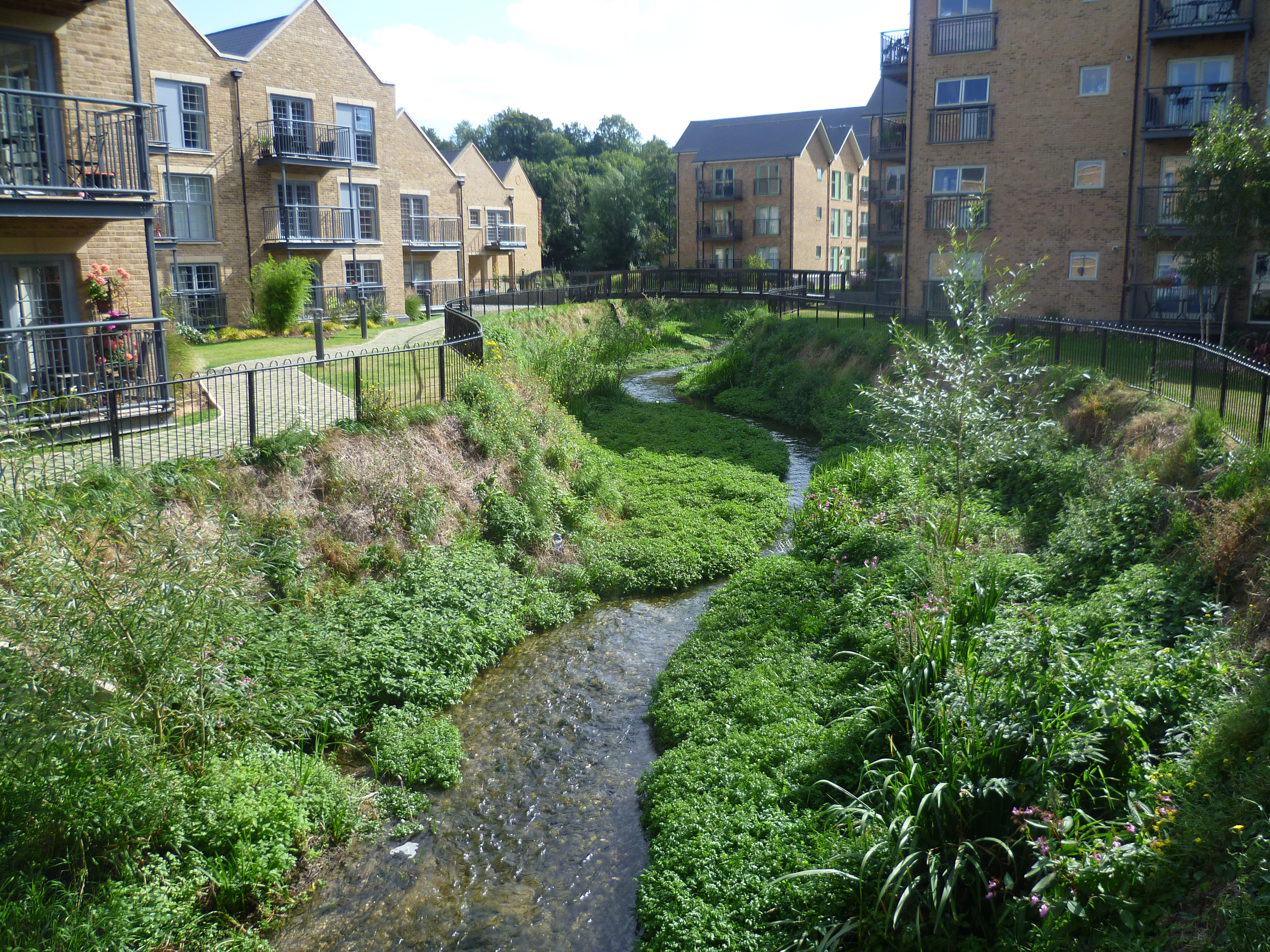
The Darent running through housing (former mill)

The closest National Rail station to Horton Kirby is Farningham Road on the Chatham Main Line, located approximately 1 mile away. The station is served by hourly Southeastern services between London Victoria and Gillingham via Bromley South.

The village is served by the Kent Country route 414 which provides hourly connections to South Darenth, Sutton-at-Hone, Hawley and Dartford.

== See also ==
- Franks Hall
