= Chalk, Kent =

Village in Kent, England

Coordinates: 51.43°N 0.41°E

Chalk
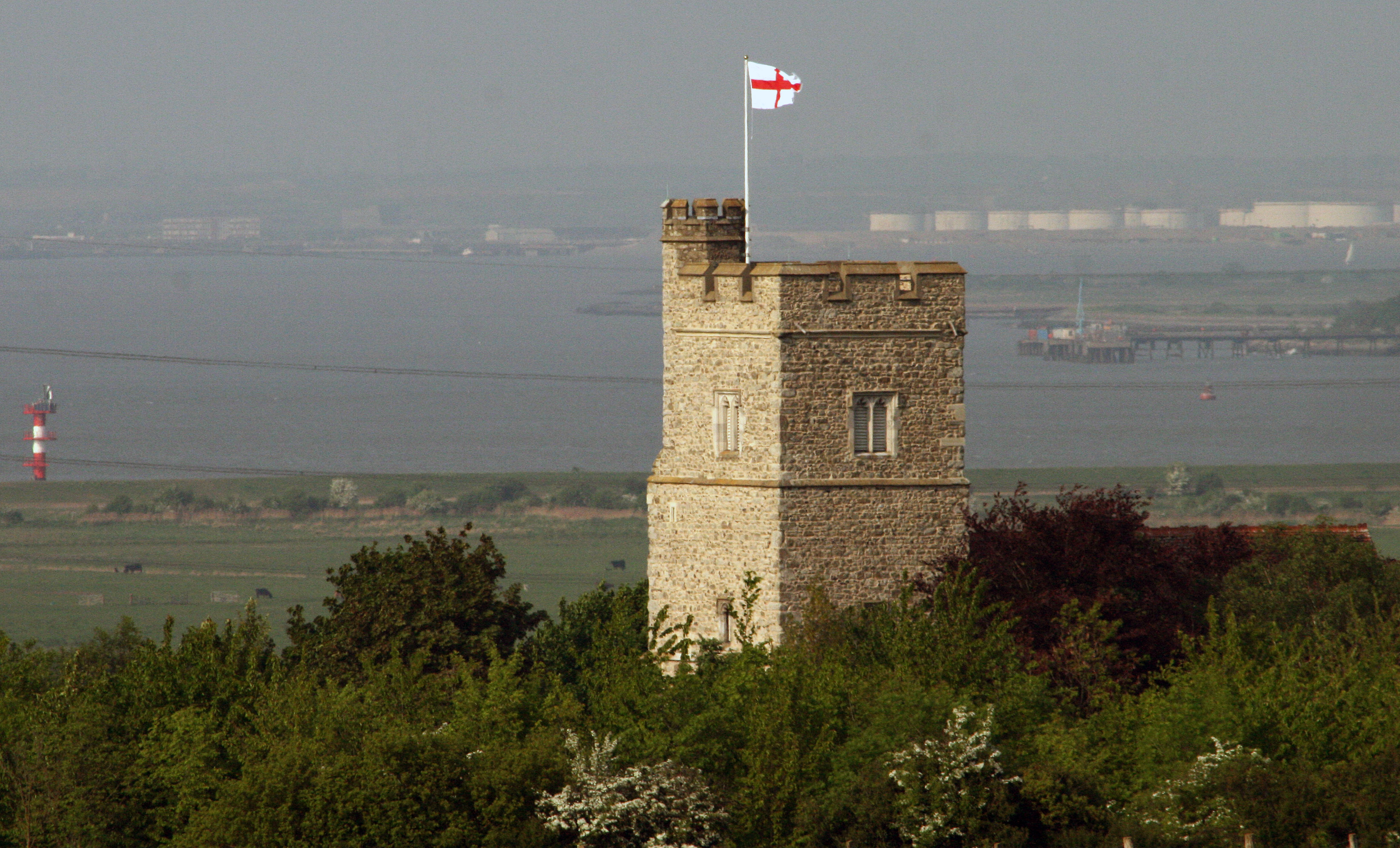
- St Mary's Church

- Location within Kent
- Population: 2,163 (2011.Ward)
- OS grid reference: TQ675735
- District: Gravesham
- Shire county: Kent
- Region: South East
- Country: England
- Sovereign state: United Kingdom
- Post town: GRAVESEND
- Postcode district: DA12
- Dialling code: 01474
- Police: Kent
- Fire: Kent
- Ambulance: South East Coast
- UK Parliament: Gravesham

Chalk is a village and since 1935 a former civil parish which adjoins the east of Gravesend, in the Gravesham district, in the county of Kent, England. As is intuitive, its name comes from the Saxon word cealc meaning a chalkstone.

One layer of the chalk carries flints, stones embedded in the chalk, and these were used in building and in providing the means of fire for muskets. The stone is often cut to provide a flat edge as a craft known as flint-knapping. The trade was worked in Chalk from the 17th century onwards. Gun-flints were produced here in large quantities until the early 19th century.

Current issues relating to the immediate environment around Chalk include a proposed new Lower Thames Crossing across the nearby estuary marshes, confirmed in 2017.

== History ==
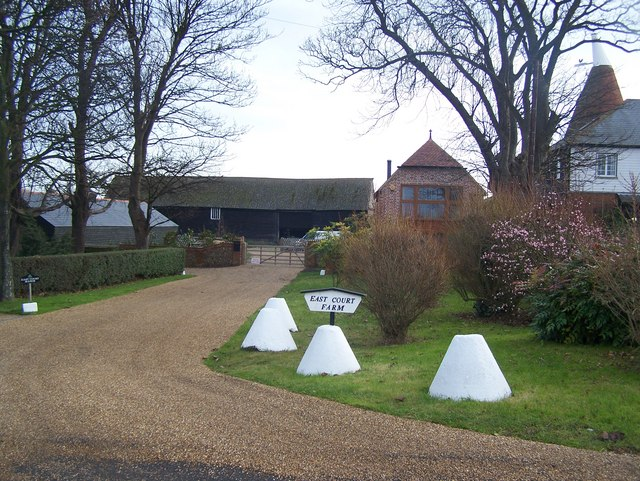
East Court Farm

Chalk was known to people as early as the 8th century, as a witanagemot (a Saxon meeting) held here is mentioned in the Domesday Book. An Iron Age settlement was discovered near St. Mary's Church during the laying of a gas pipeline. A large Roman villa was discovered here in 1961. Of the farms in the parish, Filborough is the oldest, having historical mention as early as AD 1220. At one time it was owned by Henry VIII. Two of its manor houses were called West Court and East Court.

Chalk's major claim to fame is its connection with Charles Dickens. Here he spent his honeymoon with his new bride, Catherine Hogarth; and it was here that he wrote the early instalments of Pickwick Papers. He also used the old forge in the village as a model for Joe Gargery's cottage in Great Expectations. The building still stands as a historically listed building .

In 1931 the parish had a population of 563. On 1 April 1935 the parish was abolished and merged with Gravesend and became part of the Municipal Borough: until then it had been a somewhat remote village. It is now in the unparished area of Gravesend. In the main street was one of the tollgates for toll road opened between Northfleet and Strood; it remained until 1871. In 1921 the new Gravesend-Rochester road was built which left the former main village street to the north. The village inn, the White Hart now stands on the main road (now converted and part of the Harvester Restaurant group); and the school closed to be replaced by the village hall. The school project had been the brainchild of the Vicar of Chalk during the Victorian era, the Revd. William Joynes, and was originally funded largely through Joynes's good working relationship with the Earl of Darnley; the ownership of the school became vested in the church's Diocesan Board of Education. The local church bought the site through its PCC in 1960 during the ministry of the Revd Alan Holloway. The name "Chalk Parish Hall" was formalised at this time. The building was extensively enlarged in wood and equipped with a new but non-pitched roof in the later 1960s. After the building became significantly decayed through the rotting of the wooden structure, it was totally rebuilt in brick during 2006–7, and officially re-opened by The Duke of Kent on 5 June 2007.

The parish church of St. Mary the Virgin lies some distance to the east of the village centre. A church building existed in this location for the Synod of Chalkhythe in 785 and was noted in the Domesday Book of 1086; the current structure dates from the 12th century. The font is Norman and the oldest bell was first hung in 1348. The tower, a prominent landmark for navigation in the Thames, dates from the 15th century.

Also within the parish was the one-time Gravesend Airport, opened as the Gravesend School of Flying in 1932, which during World War II became a Royal Air Force fighter base. Sold to developers in 1957, on much of its site is now one of the biggest post-war housing estates, known as Riverview Park Estate.
