= Knatts Valley =

Hamlet in Kent, England

Coordinates: 51°20′00″N 0°14′53″E

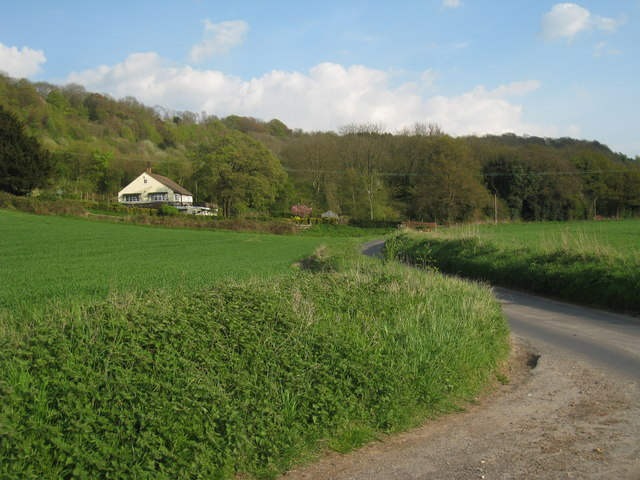
- House on Knatts Valley Road

- Location within Kent
- Civil parish: West Kingsdown
- District: Sevenoaks
- Shire county: Kent
- Region: South East
- Country: England
- Sovereign state: United Kingdom
- Post town: Sevenoaks
- Postcode district: TN15
- Police: Kent
- Fire: Kent
- Ambulance: South East Coast
- UK Parliament: Sevenoaks

Knatts Valley is a hamlet in the civil parish of West Kingsdown, in the Sevenoaks district, in the county of Kent, England.

It was originally a rural community consisting mainly of several smallholdings: the principal farms being Knatts Farm (sheep), giving its name to the area; and Maplescombe Farm (cattle). One settlement in the valley is Romney Street; the word street meaning hamlet in these parts of Kent. To the east there is a development of housing within a wooded area, mainly of detached housing, and to the west is a similar development — "East Hill". There is a golf course and a residential caravan park. Here is also an unlicensed airstrip, being part of Romney Street Farm, with a north–south grass runway east of Upper Wood.
