= Romney Street =

Hamlet in Kent, England

Coordinates: 51.330578°N 0.224329°E

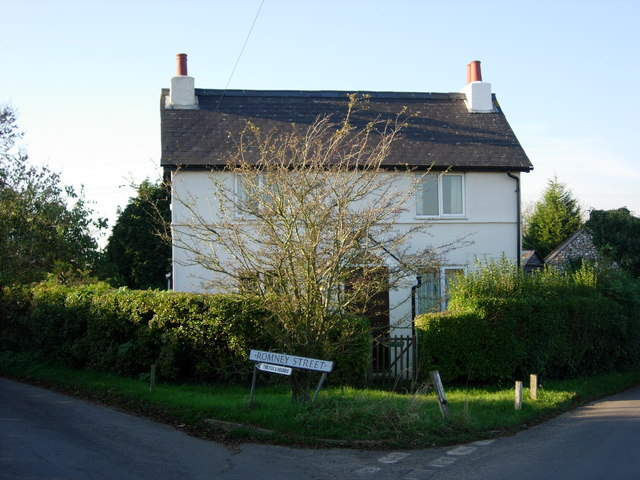
- Corner cottage

- Location within Kent
- Civil parish: Shoreham
- District: Sevenoaks
- Shire county: Kent
- Region: South East
- Country: England
- Sovereign state: United Kingdom
- Post town: Sevenoaks
- Postcode district: TN15
- Police: Kent
- Fire: Kent
- Ambulance: South East Coast
- UK Parliament: Sevenoaks

Romney Street is a hamlet in the civil parish of Shoreham, in the Sevenoaks district, in the English county of Kent.

== Location ==
It is about 4 miles north east of the town of Sevenoaks and about 1.6 miles north of the large village of Kemsing.

== Nearby hamlets ==
Nearby hamlets include East Hill, Woodlands, Knatts Valley, Maplescombe, Knockmill and Cotmans Ash.

== Transport ==
For transport there is the A20 road, the A225 road, the M20 motorway, the M26 motorway and the M25 motorway nearby. The nearest railway station is Otford railway station, which is 1.7 miles away.
