= Marianne Farningham =

British writer (1834–1909)

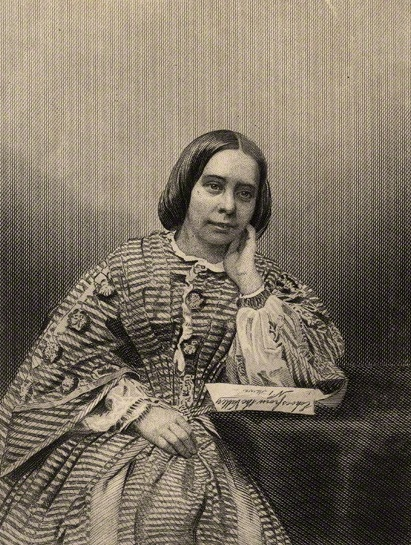
- by Thomas Williams Hunt
- Born: Mary Anne Hearn; 17 December 1834; Farningham, England
- Died: 16 March 1909 (aged 74); Barmouth, Wales
- Other name: Eva Hope
- Known for: Writing
- Children: None

Mary Anne Hearn (17 December 1834 – 16 March 1909) who wrote under the nom de plumes Marianne Farningham in The Christian World and for A Working Woman's Life, Eva Hope, and Marianne Hearn, was a British religious writer of poetry, biographies, prose and hymns. She was one of the few female writers in the Victorian period to emerge from the lower classes.

== Life ==
Mary Anne Hearn was born in Farningham in Kent in 1834 to Joseph Hearn and Rebecca Bowers, a religious Nonconformist couple in the Baptist denomination. In her memoir, she describes her thankfulness at having been raised in the country in a loving, devout, and amusing family. She tells the following anecdote about her father, a deacon and teetotaler who worked as a merchant:

My father was very fond of his bees, and he and they were good friends. I remember once he took me up with him to perform a curious little ceremony. He had lost a cousin, and he told me he was going to inform the bees, and they would say they were sorry. He tapped the hive, and then said in a low, quiet voice, "My cousin is dead," and I felt a cold shiver pass over me, as I distinctly heard a wailing response like a buzzing moan from the bees.

According to Hearn, her first piece of poetry was "an epitaph on a dead toad which we found in the garden, and which we put in a match-box and buried with great solemnity." Faced with their daughter's increasing desperation to learn how to read, Joseph and Rebecca allowed her to visit the pastor's daughter, Isabella, for basic lessons. Besides this, she was home-schooled, taught to perform domestic chores at home and to reflect on Bible stories to gain wisdom, as her family did not approve of the National School.

Hearn credits the poetry of Felicia Hemans as her inspiration for pursuing a poetic career, her first reading of "A Better Land" causing Hearn to feel faint and overcome with "strange, sweet emotions." Coming after the death of her little brother, the unexpected loss of her mother to what may have been consumption made Hearn the woman of the house at 12 years of age, forced to care for the home and her younger siblings. In the 1851 England Census, when she was 16 years of age, she is listed as "housekeeper" for her father's family. Hearn's further education was possible when the British and Foreign Bible Society opened a British School nearby, with Miss Eliza Hearn of Eynesford (no relation) as headmistress. With no time for reading and utterly despondent, Hearn was saved from a life of drudgery by this woman, who took an interest in the angry young girl after noticing her situation at church with "infinite compassion"; she consequently promoted Mary Anne's interest in education.

=== Teaching and writing career ===
An apt pupil, Hearn eventually became a teacher at the British Schools in Bristol, then Gravesend and finally Northampton. In the 1861 England Census, Hearn lived as a lodger with the Howes family at 35 Newland, Northampton, and listed her occupation as "British Schools Teacher." In 1866, after deciding to become a full-time writer, at the instigation of her Baptist pastor Jonathan Wittemore, founder of Christian World, she joined the staff of his publication. Hearn was to write for this publication for the rest of her life, her contributions forming the basis of nearly forty other works of poems, etc. These works were published under the nom de plume "Marianne Farningham," a name derived from her birthplace and her forenames and suggested by Whittemore.

She also wrote biographies of contemporary British heroes such as Grace Darling, David Livingstone, General Gordon and Queen Victoria under the name "Eva Hope."

In 1885, she became the editor of the Sunday School Times, which she had previously written for, earning an annual sum of £50.

Over the course of Farningham's lifetime, she attracted much enthusiasm from religious audiences for her poetry, as well as hymns. J.S. Featherstone, an author frequently publishing works on Sunday Schools and Temperance Societies includes her in his lengthy "A Prologue to the Poets," which references other English masters of verse from Geoffrey Chaucer, William Shakespeare and John Milton, to contemporary poets Henry Wadsworth Longfellow, John Keble, and Emma Tatham: "Then there's 'Darenth Vale with its 'Echoes' so sweet/ Come forth, Marianne, I've placed you a seat."

=== Hymns and social outreach ===
Farningham wrote a number of hymns of which "Just as I am, Thine Own to Be" is possibly the best remembered, although it is said to be a reworking of another hymn Just As I Am written by Charlotte Elliott in 1835. Passionate about education for the lower classes, she was acquainted with similarly minded female philanthropists Mary Carpenter and Frances Power Cobbe.

In 1907, two years before her death, she wrote A Working Woman's Life, an autobiography (1907) at her friends' request. Her "Foreword" partially reads: "I have had frequent misgivings while writing this autobiography, for I know of no particular reason why it should have been written; and it has appeared very egotistic to do it...My hope is that it may be useful, especially to girls and women who are timid as to the years before them and the duties they have to face. We change our mottoes as we proceed through life."

=== Death and legacy ===
Though she mentions having been once engaged while working as a teacher in Northampton, Hearn claims she soon came to know, "that the sheltered life of a married woman was not God's will concerning me." She never married or had children.

Farningham died in Barmouth, Wales on 16 March 1909 and was buried in Billing Road Cemetery, Northampton. She had been living at 12 Watkin-Terrace, Northampton since at least 1881. She left £602 18s 11d to her friends, a Miss Elizabeth Sharwood and George William Pettit, a tanner.

In 2009 a book was published to celebrate the centenary of her death.

== Works ==
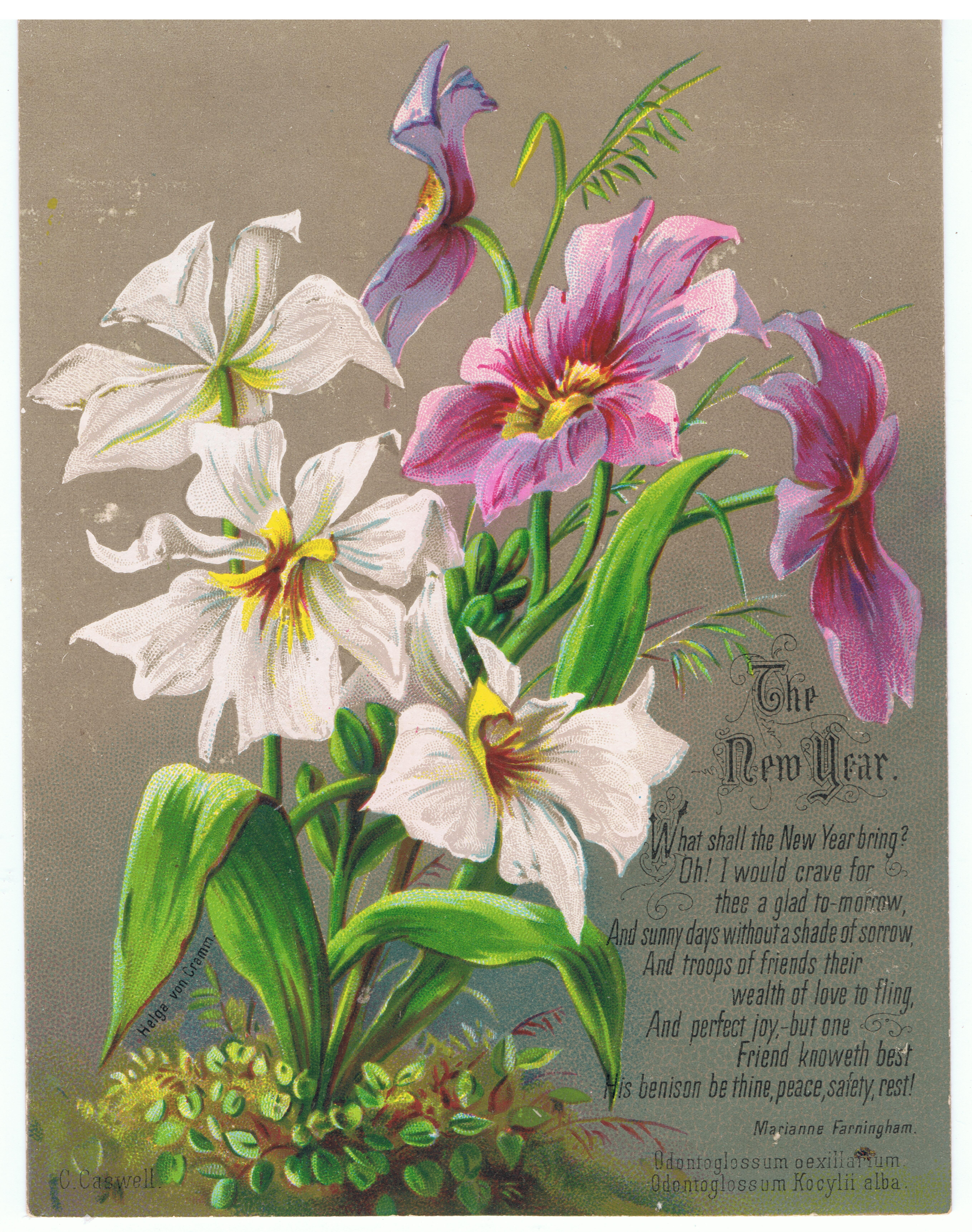
The New Year, with Odontoglossum. Chromolithograph. By Helga von Cramm with prayer by Marianne Farningham, c. 1880.

Some of her poems were fashionable as recitations including "The Last Hymn," "A Goodbye at the Door," and "A Blind Man's Story."

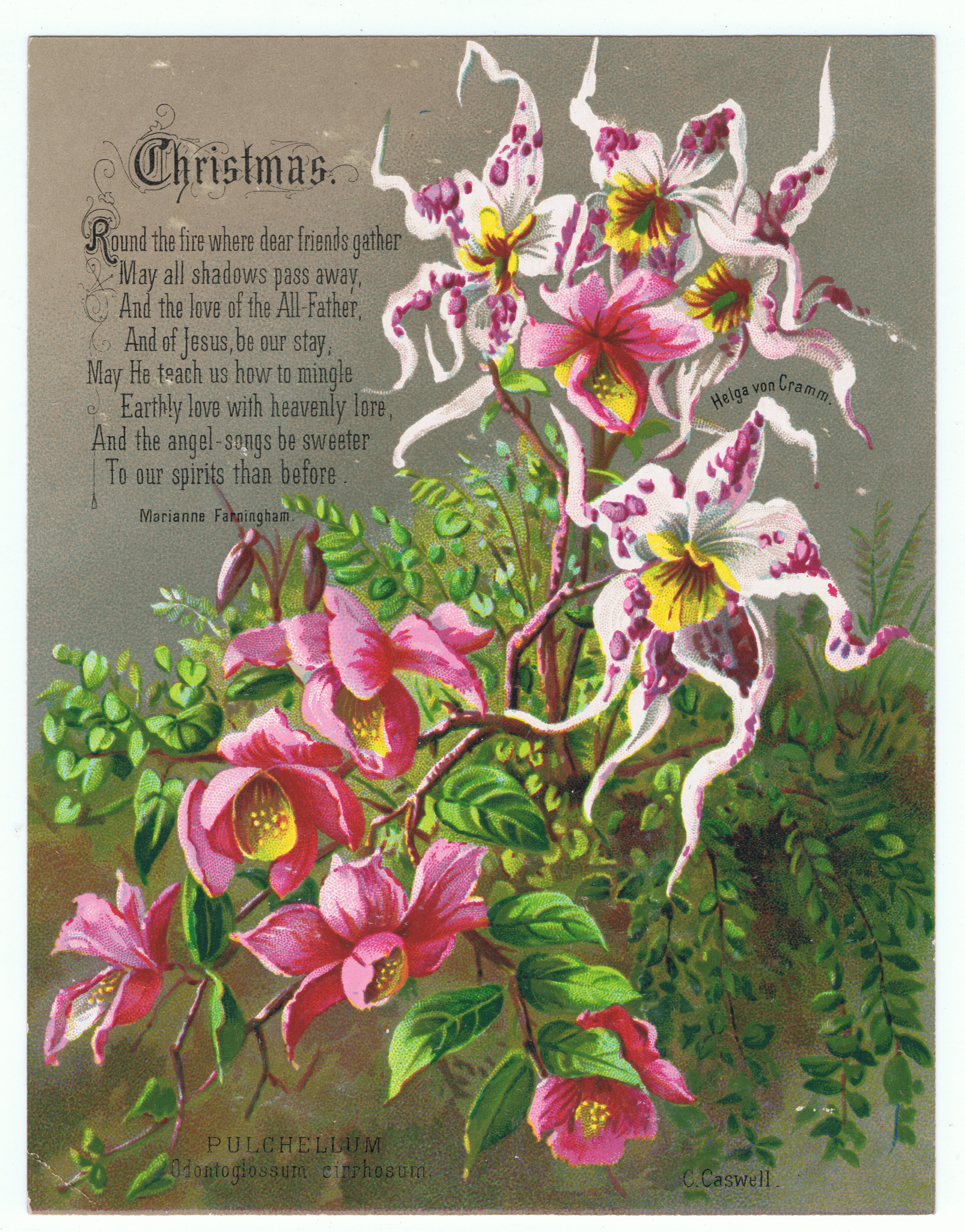
Helga von Cramm Christmas card with PULCHELLUM Odontoglossum cirrhosum and prayer by Marianne Farningham.

=== Poetry ===
- Lays and Lyrics of the Blessed Life (1861)
- Poems (1865)
- Morning and Evening Hymns for the Week (1870)
- Leaves from Elim (1873)
- Songs of Sunshine (1878)
- Harvest Gleaning and Gathered Fragments (1903)
- Lyrics of the Soul (1908)

=== Novels ===
- A Window in Paris (1898)

=== Biographies ===
- Grace Darling, Heroine of the Farne Islands (1875) (as Eva Hope)
- Life of General Gordon (1886)
- Queens of Literature of the Victorian Era (1886) (as Eva Hope)
- New World Heroes : Lincoln and Garfield: The Life-story of Two Self-made Men whom the People Made Presidents (1880)
- General Gordon, the Christian Hero (1890)
- Stanley and Africa (1890)
- Spurgeon: The People's Preacher (1892)
- Women and their Work: Wives and Daughters of the Old Testament (1906)

=== Other ===
- Girlhood (1869)
- Home Life (1869)
- Life Sketches and Echoes from the Valley (1871)
- Nineteen Hundred?: A Forecast and a Story (1892)
- A Working Woman's Life, an autobiography (1907)

=== Hymns include ===
- "Waiting and Watching for Me"
