= Farningham =

Village in Kent, England

Coordinates: 51°22′45″N 0°13′25″E

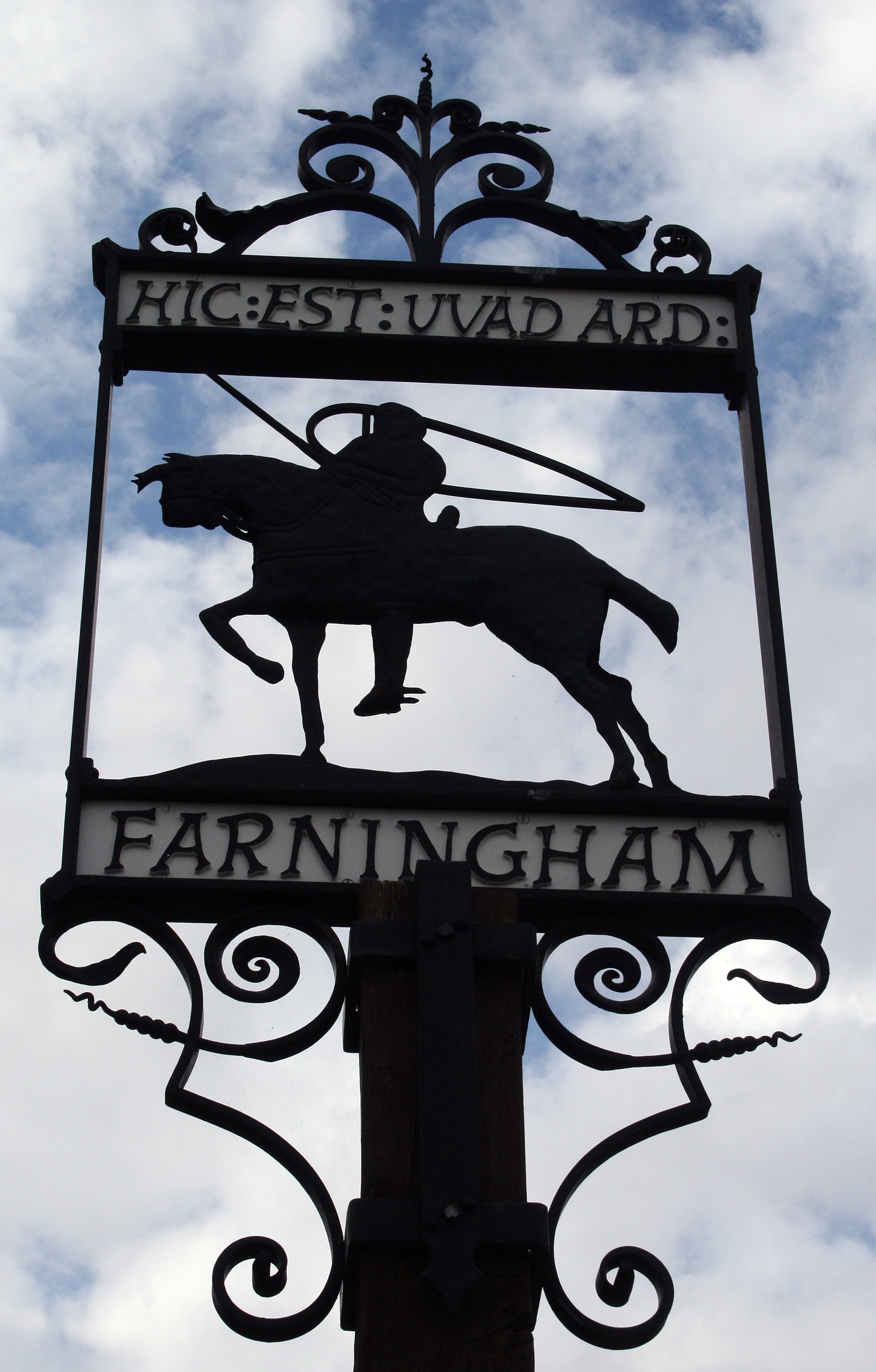
- Farningham village sign, quoting the Bayeux Tapestry

- Location within Kent
- Population: 1,319 (2011 Census)
- OS grid reference: TQ5466
- Civil parish: Farningham
- District: Sevenoaks
- Shire county: Kent
- Region: South East
- Country: England
- Sovereign state: United Kingdom
- Post town: Dartford
- Postcode district: DA4
- Dialling code: 01322
- Police: Kent
- Fire: Kent
- Ambulance: South East Coast
- UK Parliament: Sevenoaks

Farningham is a village and civil parish in the Sevenoaks District of Kent, England. It is located 3 miles (5 km) south-east of Swanley. It has a population of 1,314.

== History ==
Farningham is believed to be home to Neolithic human occupancy – flint and other tools have been discovered and can be found in the Dartford Museum. The Romans occupied the general area after their invasion in the 1st century AD and, along with large evidence of habitation down the road in Lullingstone, there is also evidence of Roman habitation in Farningham. Three farmhouses and three villas have been unearthed. Charles Dickens was a visitor during his time for the trout fishing that the Darent provided.

The Domesday Book records that before the Norman conquest, Farningham was owned by an Anglo Saxon thane called Alstan.

In the nineteenth century Farningham was adopted as the assumed surname of Marianne Farningham, a religious writer and editor, who was born here.

Used only for WW1 there used to be an airfield used by the RAF for emergency landings.

The parish church is dedicated to St Peter and St Paul.

The parish was part of Axstane Hundred and later Dartford Rural District.

== Transport ==
=== Roads ===
Farningham is situated upon the historic route of the A20, Kent's second major road between the capital and the channel ports. The village itself, with its narrow bridge over the River Darenth, and its narrow streets, was bypassed to the north east in the 1930s. The A225 runs along the Darenth valley and intersects the A20 at the village. The construction of the first sections of the M25 motorway and M20 motorway in the late 1970s bypassed the village again.

=== Rail ===
The nearest National Rail stations are Farningham Road located 2 miles north in Sutton at Hone with services to London Victoria via Bromley South and to Gillingham and Eynsford located 2 miles south with services to London Blackfriars via Bromley South & Catford and to Sevenoaks.

=== Buses ===
- 2 to Swanley or to Sevenoaks. 2 journeys each way Monday to Saturday, Operated by Go-Coach.
- 429 to Dartford via Swanley & Joydens Wood or to West Kingsdown. Monday to Saturday, Operated by Go Coach.

== Mills ==
Farningham had a watermill, powered by the River Darent, the building of which survives. There was a windmill at Chimham's Farm, which was moved in 1880 to West Kingsdown, where it still stands.

== Fort Farningham ==
One of fifteen small polygonal forts, known as the London Mobilisation Centres, which were built around London in the 1890s as part of the London Defence Positions scheme. It is sited overlooking the River Darent, around 1 mile (1.6 km) west of Farningham. A ditch surrounding the fort was filled-in during the second half of the 20th century. The site was protected by three projecting caponiers and a rampart and parapet which could be used by infantry. The interior has a central row of three casemates and a magazine. During the 1960s, a monitoring post for the Royal Observer Corps was constructed in the moat, part of the United Kingdom Warning and Monitoring Organisation and intended for the reporting of nuclear explosions during the Cold War. The fort became a scheduled monument in 2000, and is in private ownership.

== Sport ==
Home to Farningham Cricket Club along Horton Way the club has been in existence since 1857 providing cricketing facilities for the local community. Currently fielding two senior league Saturday teams and one Sunday friendly team along with a thriving junior section.

== See also ==
- Listed buildings in Farningham
