= East Hill, Kent =

Hamlet in Kent, England

Coordinates: 51°20′22″N 0°14′06″E

East Hill
- Location within Kent
- Civil parish: West Kingsdown
- District: Sevenoaks
- Shire county: Kent
- Region: South East
- Country: England
- Sovereign state: United Kingdom
- Post town: Sevenoaks
- Postcode district: TN15
- Police: Kent
- Fire: Kent
- Ambulance: South East Coast
- UK Parliament: Sevenoaks

East Hill is a hamlet in the civil parish of West Kingsdown, in the Sevenoaks District, in the county of Kent in England.

== Location ==
East Hill is about eight miles north west of the large town of Sevenoaks and about four miles north of the large village of Kemsing and about two miles south west of the large village of West Kingsdown.

== Nearby hamlets ==
Nearby hamlets include Romney Street, Woodlands, Knatts Valley, Maplescombe, Knockmill and Cotmans Ash.

== Amenities ==
There are about a dozen woods nearby with miles of public footpaths. It also has a caravan and camping site.

== Transport ==
The hamlet is on a minor dead-end road (East Hill Road). although it is within a few miles of the A20, the A225 road and the M20, M26 and M25 motorways. The nearest railway station is Otford railway station, approximately four miles away.

== Sources ==
- A-Z Great Britain Road Atlas (page 181)
- http://www.ikent.co.uk/profile/71091/Sevenoaks/East-Hill-Farm-Caravan-Park/
