= Listed buildings in Farningham =

Civil Parish in Kent, England

Farningham is a village and civil parish in the Sevenoaks District of Kent, England. It contains one grade I, four grade II* and 48 grade II listed buildings that are recorded in the National Heritage List for England.

This list is based on the information retrieved online from Historic England.

== Key ==
Grade	Criteria
I	Buildings that are of exceptional interest
II*	Particularly important buildings of more than special interest
II	Buildings that are of special interest

== Listing ==
Name	Grade	Location	Type	Completed (Note: The date given is the date used by Historic England as significant for the initial building or that of an important part in the structure's description.)	Date designated	Grid ref. (Note: The grid reference is based on the British national grid reference system, sometimes known as OSGB36, used by the Ordnance Survey.) Geo-coordinates	Notes	Entry number (Note: The "List Entry Number" is a unique number assigned to each listed building and scheduled monument by Historic England.)	Image	Wikidata
Beesfield Farmhouse	II	Beesfield Lane			28 January 1982	TQ5542766048; 51°22′20″N 0°13′54″E		1222524	Upload Photo	Q26516848
Lavender Bank	II	1 and 2, Beesfield Lane			22 October 1982	TQ5507366581; 51°22′38″N 0°13′36″E		1274754	Upload Photo	Q26564396
Bee Bole in South West Garden Wall to No 7	II	7, Dartford Road			11 April 1986	TQ5456567157; 51°22′57″N 0°13′11″E		1222228	Upload Photo	Q26516574
Boundary Wall to North East of the Croft, Fronting Road	II	Fronting Road, High Street			3 November 1972	TQ5487166784; 51°22′44″N 0°13′26″E		1274480	Upload Photo	Q26564142
46 and 47, High Street	II	46 and 47, High Street			1 June 1967	TQ5482466844; 51°22′46″N 0°13′24″E		1237798	Upload Photo	Q26530904
48-51, High Street	II	48-51, High Street			1 June 1967	TQ5483166835; 51°22′46″N 0°13′24″E		1237800	Upload Photo	Q26530906
5 and 6, High Street	II	5 and 6, High Street			22 October 1982	TQ5450467110; 51°22′55″N 0°13′08″E		1274319	Upload Photo	Q26563996
Barn at Manor Farm and Wall Adjoining to South East Fronting Road	II	High Street			1 June 1967	TQ5473866961; 51°22′50″N 0°13′20″E		1237795	Upload Photo	Q26530901
Bridge Cottage Mill Cottages	II	High Street			1 June 1967	TQ5458367027; 51°22′52″N 0°13′12″E		1237805	Upload Photo	Q26530910
Church of Saint Peter and Saint Paul	I	High Street			1 June 1967	TQ5471466904; 51°22′48″N 0°13′18″E		1237990	Church of Saint Peter and Saint Paul More images	Q17529860
Farningham Bridge	II	High Street			1 August 1952	TQ5460567038; 51°22′53″N 0°13′13″E		1222229	Farningham Bridge More images	Q26516575
Farningham House	II	High Street			1 June 1967	TQ5481466866; 51°22′47″N 0°13′23″E		1274448	Upload Photo	Q26564115
Farningham House Cottage	II	High Street			1 June 1967	TQ5481866858; 51°22′47″N 0°13′24″E		1237911	Upload Photo	Q26531011
Fernwood	II	High Street			22 October 1982	TQ5446067142; 51°22′56″N 0°13′06″E		1274756	Upload Photo	Q26564398
Folly in Grounds of Mill House Situated to West of the Water Mill	II	High Street			22 October 1982	TQ5448867016; 51°22′52″N 0°13′07″E		1237806	Upload Photo	Q26530911
Former Stable to the Lion Hotel	II	High Street			22 October 1982	TQ5461267083; 51°22′54″N 0°13′13″E		1274513	Upload Photo	Q26564169
Front Block to Farningham Social Club and Institute (croft House)	II	High Street			3 November 1972	TQ5485066791; 51°22′45″N 0°13′25″E		1237981	Upload Photo	Q26531075
Garden Wall Fronting Road to South West of Farningham House	II	High Street			22 October 1982	TQ5480266864; 51°22′47″N 0°13′23″E		1237797	Upload Photo	Q26530903
Garden Wall to North East Fronting Road and to South East of the Manor House and Gates	II	High Street			1 June 1967	TQ5461367009; 51°22′52″N 0°13′13″E		1238030	Upload Photo	Q26531119
Glebe House	II	High Street			14 September 1973	TQ5474366849; 51°22′47″N 0°13′20″E		1274481	Upload Photo	Q26564143
Hodsoll House	II	High Street			1 June 1967	TQ5478666894; 51°22′48″N 0°13′22″E		1237903	Upload Photo	Q26531005
Lion Cottages (no 1 Darenth Insurance Brokers Limited)(nos 2 and 3)	II	1-3, High Street			1 June 1967	TQ5457667054; 51°22′53″N 0°13′11″E		1274339	Lion Cottages (no 1 Darenth Insurance Brokers Limited)(nos 2 and 3) More images	Q26564015
Mausoleum of Thomas Nash in Churchyard of Saint Peter and Saint Paul to the South of Porch	II*	High Street			22 October 1982	TQ5471666879; 51°22′48″N 0°13′18″E		1237803	Upload Photo	Q17545525
Mill House	II*	High Street			1 August 1952	TQ5451066993; 51°22′51″N 0°13′08″E		1274483	Mill House More images	Q17545887
Monument to William Hardyman in Churchyard of Saint Peter and Saint Paul to East of Church	II	High Street			22 October 1982	TQ5474466887; 51°22′48″N 0°13′20″E		1238016	Upload Photo	Q26531107
No 56 (vale View) and No 57 (forge Cottage)	II	56 and 57, High Street			22 October 1982	TQ5485466813; 51°22′45″N 0°13′25″E		1274479	Upload Photo	Q26564141
Nos 7,8 and 9 (protea Cottage)	II	8 and 9 (protea Cottage), 7-9, High Street			22 October 1982	TQ5448267119; 51°22′56″N 0°13′07″E		1274293	Upload Photo	Q26563970
Old Bakehouse and Cartshed	II	High Street			22 October 1982	TQ5475466932; 51°22′49″N 0°13′20″E		1274476	Upload Photo	Q26564139
Old Parsonage House	II	High Street			22 October 1982	TQ5466966906; 51°22′48″N 0°13′16″E		1237804	Upload Photo	Q26530909
Ornamental Screen Across the River to the North East of the Bridge	II	High Street			1 August 1952	TQ5462967038; 51°22′53″N 0°13′14″E		1222578	Ornamental Screen Across the River to the North East of the Bridge More images	Q26516900
Riverside Manor House Cottage and Former Stables Now Used As Garages	II	High Street			1 June 1967	TQ5458866991; 51°22′51″N 0°13′12″E		1274482	Upload Photo	Q26564144
Saddlers House	II	High Street			22 October 1982	TQ5452367121; 51°22′56″N 0°13′09″E		1222231	Upload Photo	Q26516577
South Hall	II	High Street			1 June 1967	TQ5490166740; 51°22′43″N 0°13′28″E		1274426	Upload Photo	Q26564095
Statue Set on Plinth to West of Folly	II	High Street			22 October 1982	TQ5448067009; 51°22′52″N 0°13′06″E		1274330	Upload Photo	Q26564006
The Bakery	II	High Street			4 February 1981	TQ5476766921; 51°22′49″N 0°13′21″E		1237796	Upload Photo	Q26530902
The Cottage	II	High Street			1 June 1967	TQ5449567136; 51°22′56″N 0°13′07″E		1237743	Upload Photo	Q26530855
The Croft	II	High Street			1 June 1967	TQ5484966759; 51°22′44″N 0°13′25″E		1237979	Upload Photo	Q26531073
The Lion Hotel	II	High Street			1 August 1952	TQ5459667072; 51°22′54″N 0°13′12″E		1274760	The Lion Hotel More images	Q26564402
The Manor House	II	High Street			1 June 1967	TQ5461666972; 51°22′51″N 0°13′13″E		1238019	Upload Photo	Q26531110
The Pied Bull Public House	II	High Street			1 June 1967	TQ5481266825; 51°22′46″N 0°13′23″E		1237802	The Pied Bull Public House More images	Q26530908
The Water Mill	II*	High Street			1 August 1952	TQ5450467008; 51°22′52″N 0°13′08″E		1238035	The Water Mill More images	Q17545530
The White House	II*	1-3, High Street			1 June 1967	TQ5455767104; 51°22′55″N 0°13′10″E		1274501	The White House More images	Q17545892
28, London Road	II	28, London Road			22 October 1982	TQ5431467193; 51°22′58″N 0°12′58″E		1238232	Upload Photo	Q26531301
40, London Road	II	40, London Road			22 October 1982	TQ5424967223; 51°22′59″N 0°12′55″E		1274294	Upload Photo	Q26563971
Maplescombe	II	Maplescombe Lane			1 June 1967	TQ5597564273; 51°21′22″N 0°14′19″E		1238233	Upload Photo	Q26698628
Cherry Tree Cottage, Owl Cottage, John Board Family Butcher	II	High Street			22 October 1982	TQ5452967093; 51°22′55″N 0°13′09″E		1274484	Upload Photo	Q26564145
Boundary Wall of South Hall to the North West, South West, South East, and Part of Wall Fronting Road to East of South Hall	II	High Street			22 October 1982	TQ5489466752; 51°22′43″N 0°13′27″E		1237801	Upload Photo	Q26530907
The Stables of the Mill House, the Counting House and Gardeners Cottage	II	High Street			1 June 1967	TQ5454067001; 51°22′52″N 0°13′09″E		1237807	Upload Photo	Q26530912
Hampton Court House	II	Sparepenny Lane			1 June 1967	TQ5436066999; 51°22′52″N 0°13′00″E		1274296	Upload Photo	Q26563973
Mount Pleasant	II	Sparepenny Lane			1 June 1967	TQ5438967066; 51°22′54″N 0°13′02″E		1238235	Upload Photo	Q26531303
The Mount	II	Sparepenny Lane			1 June 1967	TQ5439867082; 51°22′54″N 0°13′02″E		1274295	The Mount More images	Q26563972
L Shaped Garden Wall to the Mount, to North East of House	II	Sparepenny Lane			22 October 1982	TQ5442867096; 51°22′55″N 0°13′04″E		1238302	Upload Photo	Q26531367
Garden Wall to Mount Pleasant, to South East of the House Fronting Road	II	Sparepenny Lane			22 October 1982	TQ5439867051; 51°22′53″N 0°13′02″E		1238308	Upload Photo	Q26531373

== See also ==
- Grade I listed buildings in Kent
- Grade II* listed buildings in Kent

== Sources ==
- Newman, John (2012) [1969], Kent: West and the Weald, The Buildings of England, New Haven and London: Yale University Press, ISBN 978-0-300-18509-6
