= West Kingsdown Windmill =

Windmill in West Kingsdown, Kent, England

West Kingsdown Post Mill
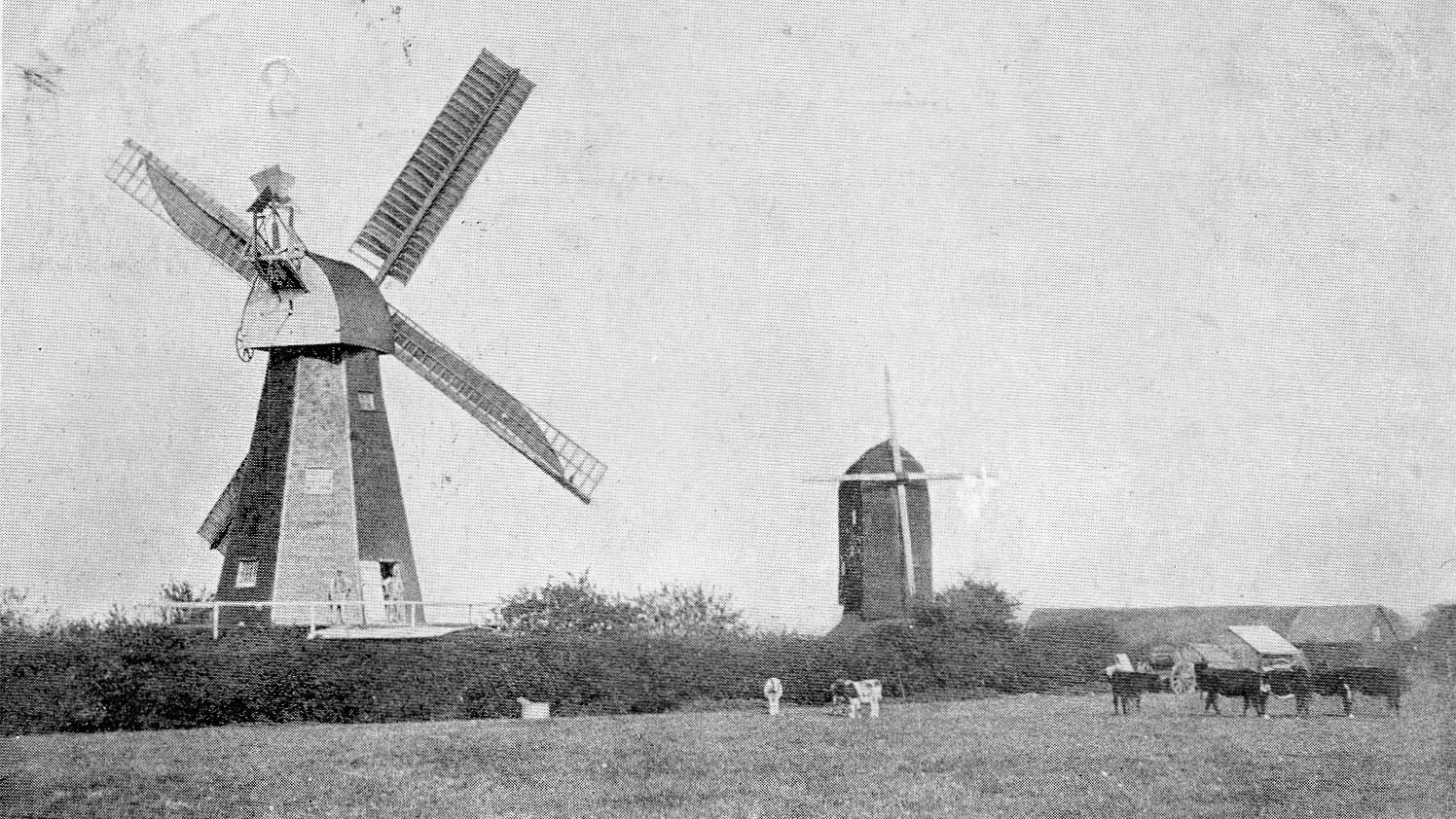
- The windmills in 1906

Origin
- Mill name: Old Mill
- Coordinates: 51°20′14″N 0°16′11″E
- Year built: Late 19th century

Information
- Purpose: Corn mill
- Type: Post mill
- Roundhouse storeys: Single storey roundhouse
- No. of sails: Four sails
- Type of sails: Two Common sails and two Spring Sails
- Windshaft: Cast iron
- Winding: Tailpole
- Year lost: 1909
- Other information: Moved from Tubs Hill, Sevenoaks between 1864 and 1880

West Kingsdown Smock Mill
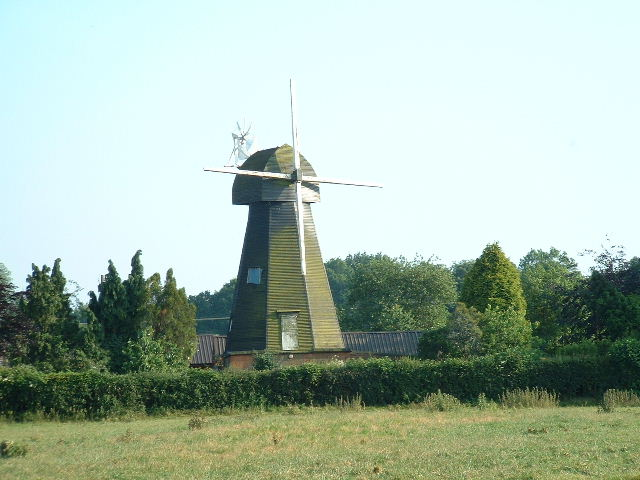
- The surviving smock mill

Origin
- Mill location: Pells Lane, West Kingsdown, Kent
- Grid reference: TQ 582 623
- Operator(s): Kent County Council
- Year built: 1880

Information
- Purpose: Corn mill
- Type: Smock mill
- Storeys: Four-storey smock
- Base storeys: Single-storey base
- Smock sides: Eight-sided
- No. of sails: Four
- Type of sails: Two Common sails and two double Patent sails
- Windshaft: Cast iron
- Winding: Fantail
- Fantail blades: Seven blades
- No. of pairs of millstones: Three pairs
- Other information: Moved from Farningham in 1880

West Kingsdown Windmill is a Grade II listed smock mill in West Kingsdown, Kent, England, that was built in the early nineteenth century at Farningham and moved to West Kingsdown in 1880. It is the survivor of a pair of windmills.

== History ==
=== Post mill ===
William Coles Finch stated that the post mill was originally built at Sevenoaks. However, the mill may have been built on site c.1804, when it was advertised for sale in the Kentish gazette of 25 September 1804.

In 1880, it was joined by the smock mill that was moved from Farningham and which survives today. The post mill was burnt down in May 1909 when a steam roller set fire to some straw near the mill and the fire then spread to the mill.

=== Smock mill ===
West Kingsdown Windmill was built in the early nineteenth century at Chimham's Farm, Farningham. It was marked on the 1819–20 Ordnance Survey map, Greenwoods map of 1821 and the Farningham Tithe Map of 1840. In 1880, it was moved to West Kingsdown, joining a post mill that was already there. The post mill burnt down in May 1909. The mill was working by wind until 1928. One of the sails was damaged on 25 December 1929 and the fantail blew off in November 1930. The mill was restored externally in 1960 by Thompson & Son, Millwrights of Alford, Lincolnshire at a cost of £4.400. In 2009, repairs to the weatherboards were made, and the mill was repainted. As of November 2010, it is awaiting the fitting of new sails.

== Description ==
=== Post mill ===
Old Mill was a post mill on a single-storey roundhouse. It was winded by a tailpole. It had two Spring sails and two Common Sails carried on a cast-iron windshaft.

=== Smock Mill ===
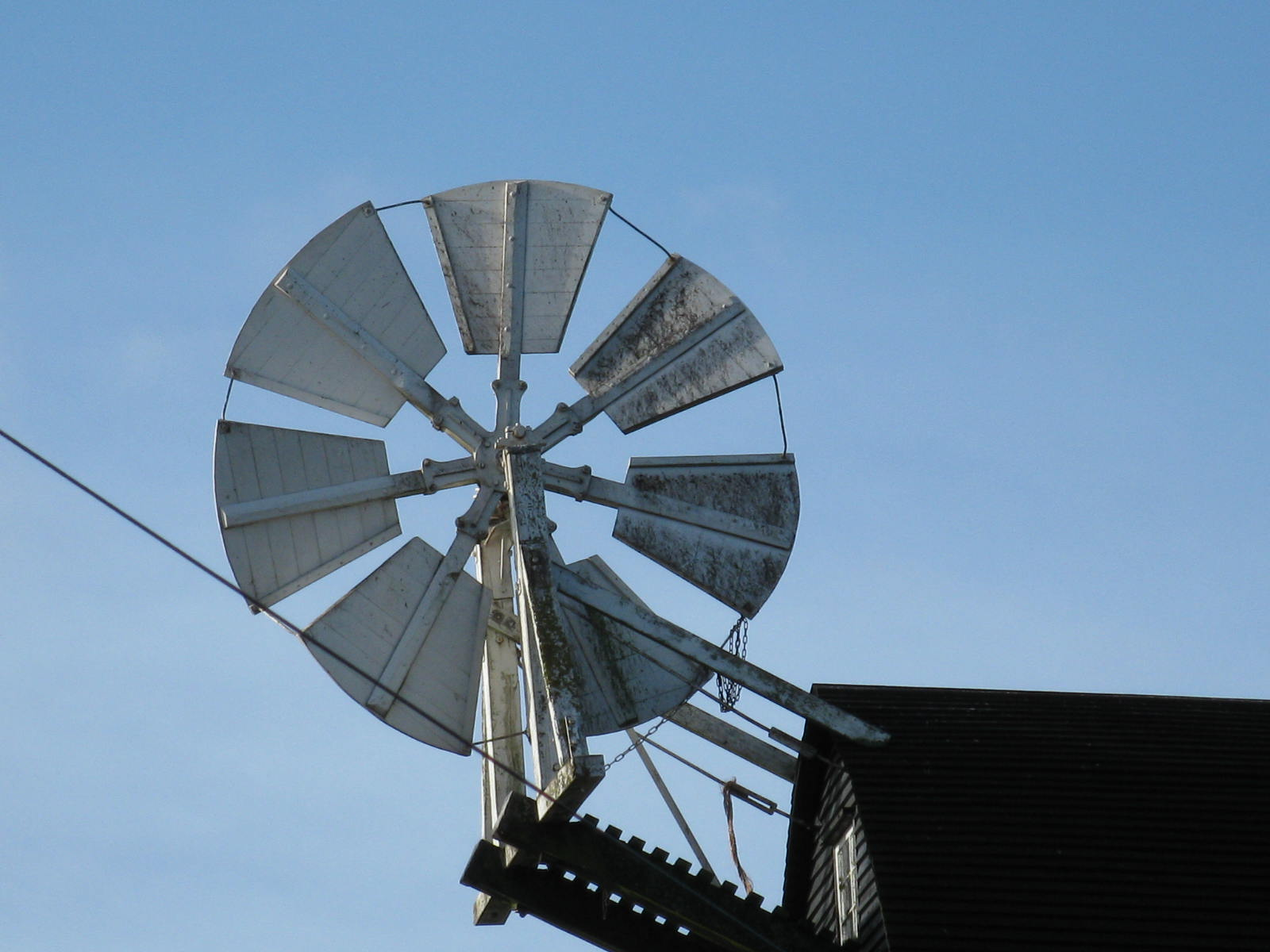
The Fantail, January 2009

West Kingsdown Mill is a four-storey smock mill on a single storey single-storey brick base. There was a stage at first-floor level. It has two double Patent sails and two Common sails carried on a cast-iron windshaft. The mill is winded by a fantail. The original fantail had seven blades, but this was replaced with a six-bladed one when the mill was restored in 1960. A seven-bladed fantail has since been fitted. All the machinery remains in the mill, except for the final drive to the millstones.

== Millers ==
=== Post mill ===
Sevenoaks

- William Knott 1792 - 1814
- Charles Knott - 1864
- William Eames 1864-

West Kingsdown

- Tanner Norton 1880-

=== Smock mill ===
Farningham

- Collyer 1826 - 1850
- William Kipping 1840
- W Moore
- David Norton
- Tanner Norton - 1880

West Kingsdown

- Tanner Norton 1880 -
- Frank Norton
- Cork 1929
- Hankin

References for above:-
