= Listed buildings in West Kingsdown =

Civil Parish in Kent, England

West Kingsdown is a village and civil parish in the Sevenoaks District of Kent, England. It contains one grade I and 14 grade II listed buildings that are recorded in the National Heritage List for England.

This list is based on the information retrieved online from Historic England.

== Key ==
Grade	Criteria
I	Buildings that are of exceptional interest
II*	Particularly important buildings of more than special interest
II	Buildings that are of special interest

== Listing ==
Name	Grade	Location	Type	Completed (Note: The date given is the date used by Historic England as significant for the initial building or that of an important part in the structure's description.)	Date designated	Grid ref. (Note: The grid reference is based on the British national grid reference system, sometimes known as OSGB36, used by the Ordnance Survey.) Geo-coordinates	Notes	Entry number (Note: The "List Entry Number" is a unique number assigned to each listed building and scheduled monument by Historic England.)	Image	Wikidata
Crowhurst Farm Cottages	II	1 and 2, Crowhurst Lane			10 May 1979	TQ5850663134; 51°20′43″N 0°16′28″E		1223100	Upload Photo	Q26517377
East Hill Farmhouse	II	East Hill Road			22 October 1982	TQ5593661996; 51°20′08″N 0°14′14″E		1223101	Upload Photo	Q26517378
Church of Saint Edmund	I	Fawkham Road			1 June 1967	TQ5799263353; 51°20′50″N 0°16′02″E		1267477	Church of Saint Edmund More images	Q17529896
The Ruins of Maplescombe Chapel	II	Maplescombe Lane			1 June 1967	TQ5620463746; 51°21′05″N 0°14′30″E		1223102	The Ruins of Maplescombe Chapel More images	Q17641150
Kingsdown Mill	II	Pells Lane			1 June 1967	TQ5820262245; 51°20′14″N 0°16′11″E		1267420	Kingsdown Mill More images	Q7985632
Barn and Cowshed at Drane Farm	II	Saint Clere Hill Road			22 October 1982	TQ5760260376; 51°19′14″N 0°15′37″E		1267478	Upload Photo	Q26557870
Earlylands	II	School Lane			22 October 1982	TQ5751061411; 51°19′48″N 0°15′34″E		1223241	Upload Photo	Q26517515
Garage Immediately to North East of Oaklands	II	School Lane			22 October 1982	TQ5766761406; 51°19′48″N 0°15′42″E		1223105	Upload Photo	Q26517382
Oaklands	II	School Lane			22 October 1982	TQ5765361397; 51°19′47″N 0°15′41″E		1223240	Upload Photo	Q26517514
Stacklands Cottage	II	1 and 2, School Lane			22 October 1982	TQ5778861847; 51°20′02″N 0°15′49″E		1223104	Upload Photo	Q26517381
Tidy's Cottage	II	School Lane			22 October 1982	TQ5792662168; 51°20′12″N 0°15′57″E		1223236	Upload Photo	Q26517510
Terry's Lodge Farmhouse	II	Terry's Lodge Road			22 October 1982	TQ5901160630; 51°19′21″N 0°16′50″E		1223106	Upload Photo	Q26517383
Church of Saint Mary the Virgin	II	Tinker Pot Lane, Woodlands			22 October 1982	TQ5637960640; 51°19′24″N 0°14′34″E		1223399	Church of Saint Mary the Virgin More images	Q26517670
Knockmill	II	Tinker Pot Lane, Woodlands			22 October 1982	TQ5729261221; 51°19′42″N 0°15′22″E		1223108	Upload Photo	Q26517385
Woodlands Church Cottage and St Marys Woodlands Church Hall	II	Tinker Pot Lane, Woodlands			22 October 1982	TQ5640360653; 51°19′25″N 0°14′36″E		1223109	Upload Photo	Q26517387

== See also ==
- Grade I listed buildings in Kent
- Grade II* listed buildings in Kent

== Sources ==
- Newman, John (2012) [1969], Kent: West and the Weald, The Buildings of England, New Haven and London: Yale University Press, ISBN 978-0-300-18509-6
