= Helga von Cramm =

German painter

Baroness Helga von Cramm (1840–1919) was a German and Swiss painter, illustrator and graphic artist.

== Early life ==
Baroness Helga von Cramm was the eldest child of Wolf Frederick Adolf von Cramm-Burchard (1812–1879) and his wife Hedwig (1819–1891), daughter of Philipp Lebrecht von Cramm-Oelber. Her father had served in the Brunswick Cuirassiers, was an equerry and a hereditary Chamberlain and Lord of the Kings Bedchamber of William VIII of Braunschweig). Later he retired to his estate at Rhode.

In 1885 she married landed Brunswickian politician Erich Griepenkerl (1813–1888), son of Friedrich Konrad Griepenkerl (1782–1849) and brother of Wolfgang Robert Griepenkerl (1810–1868). However, he died three years later. On 19 November 1896, Helga Griepenkerl arrived in New York City having sailed from Bremen to New York via Southampton on the Lahn.

== Career ==
A Manchester Guardian review of her work read: "... oils and watercolours of foreign landscapes, particularly Egyptian; Switzerland, the Canary Islands, the Black Forest, and Genua. The subjects are many of them striking, and travellers are likely to appreciate the pictures as mementoes of beautiful scenes. The treatment is not piquant, but it has considerable suavity."

In the United Kingdom she exhibited at the Society of Women Artists, Royal Scottish Academy, Royal Institute of Painters in Water Colours, Dudley Gallery, Fine Art Society, Glasgow Institute, Grosvenor Gallery, Royal Hibernian Academy of Arts, and Royal Society of British Artists.

She also exhibited at the Graves Gallery in 1908.

== Gallery ==
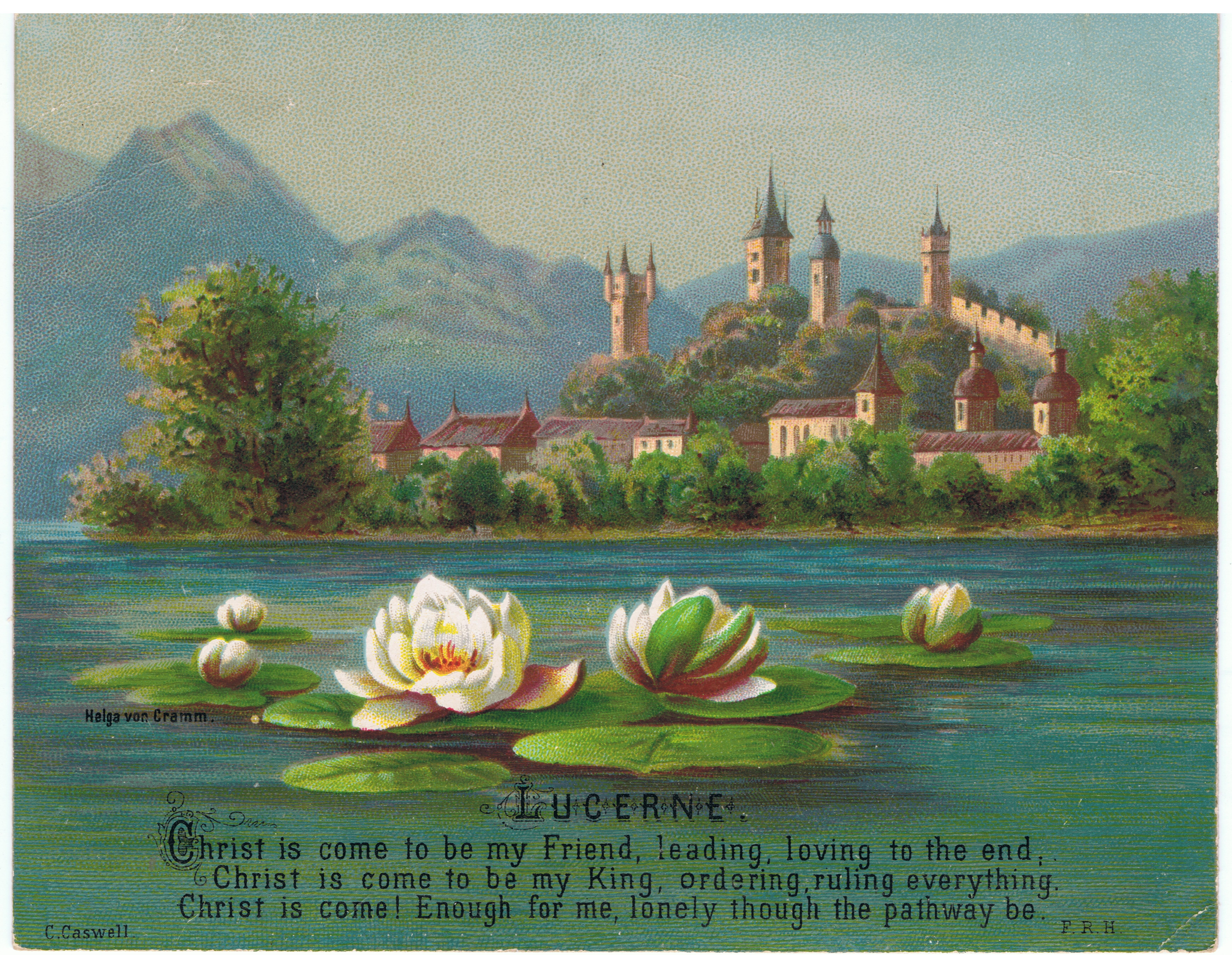
Lucerne

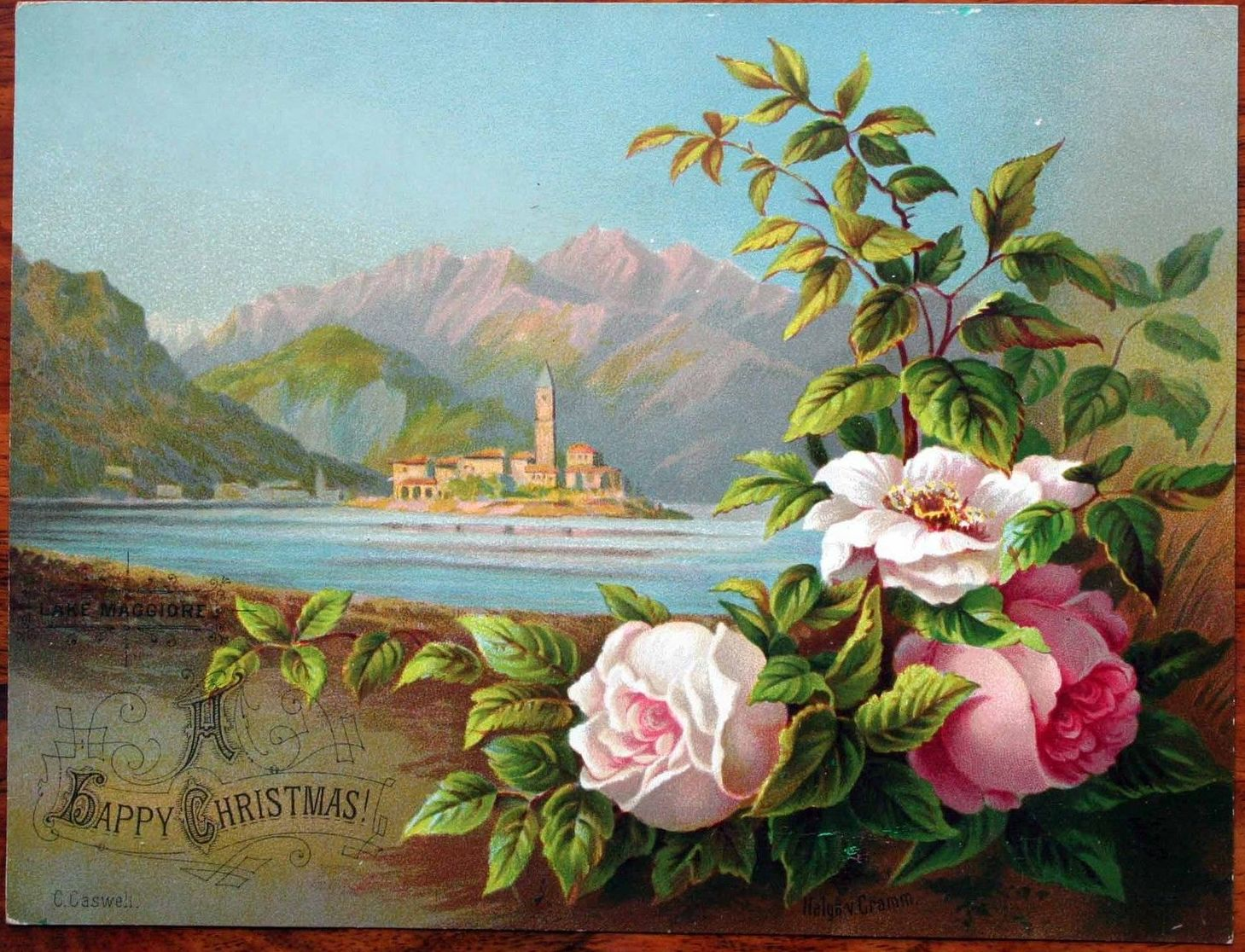
Lake Maggiore, Christmas card

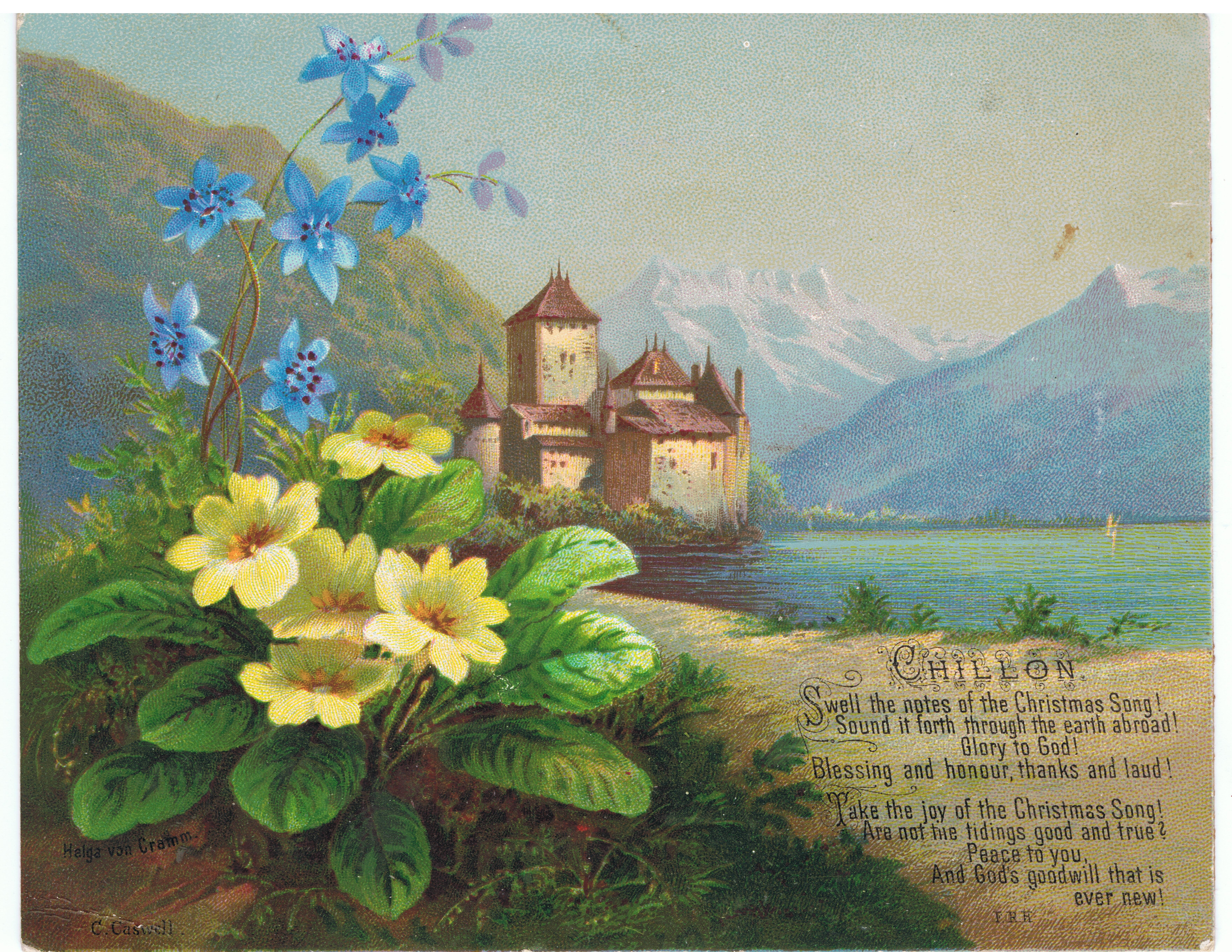
Chillon Castle

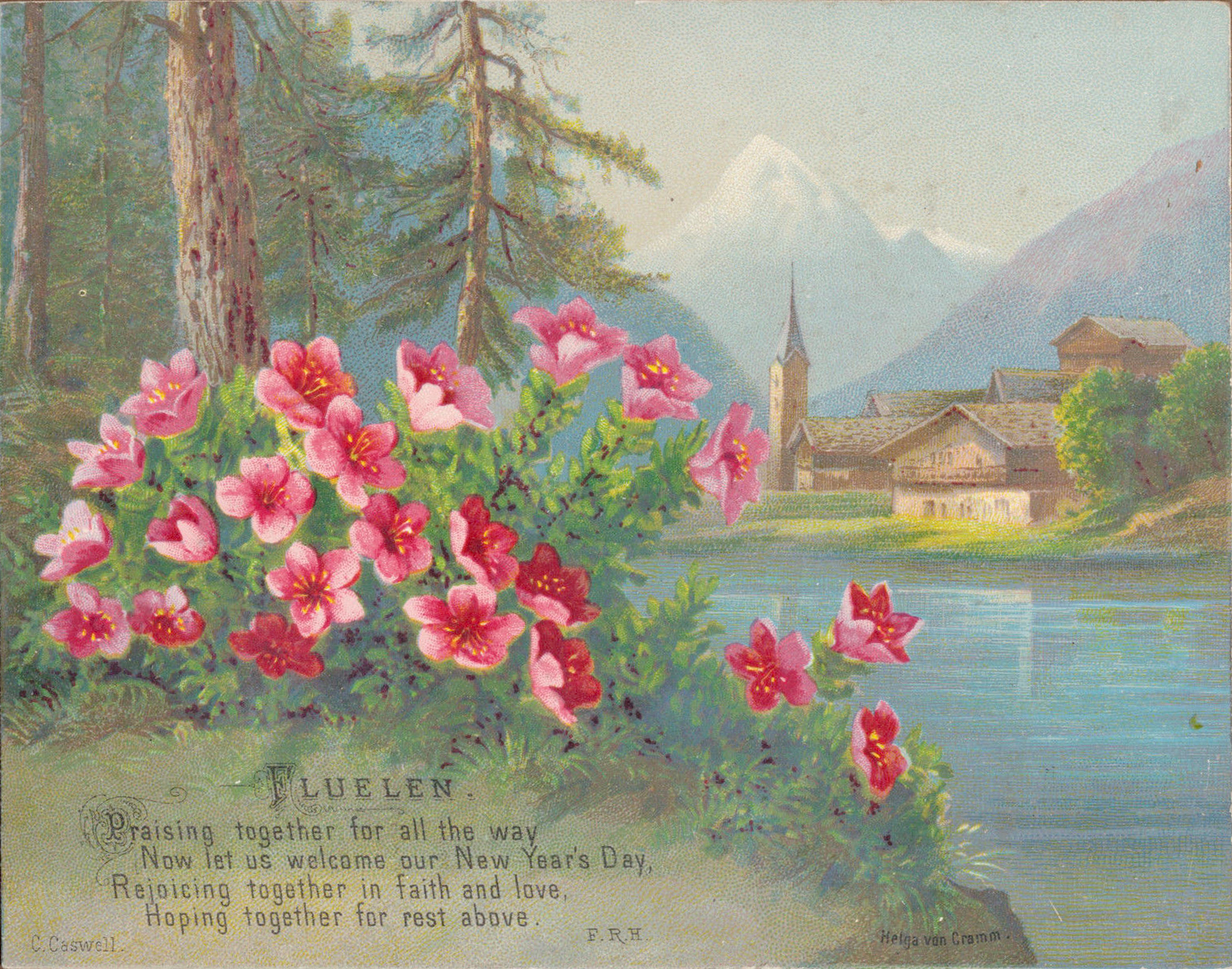
Flüelen

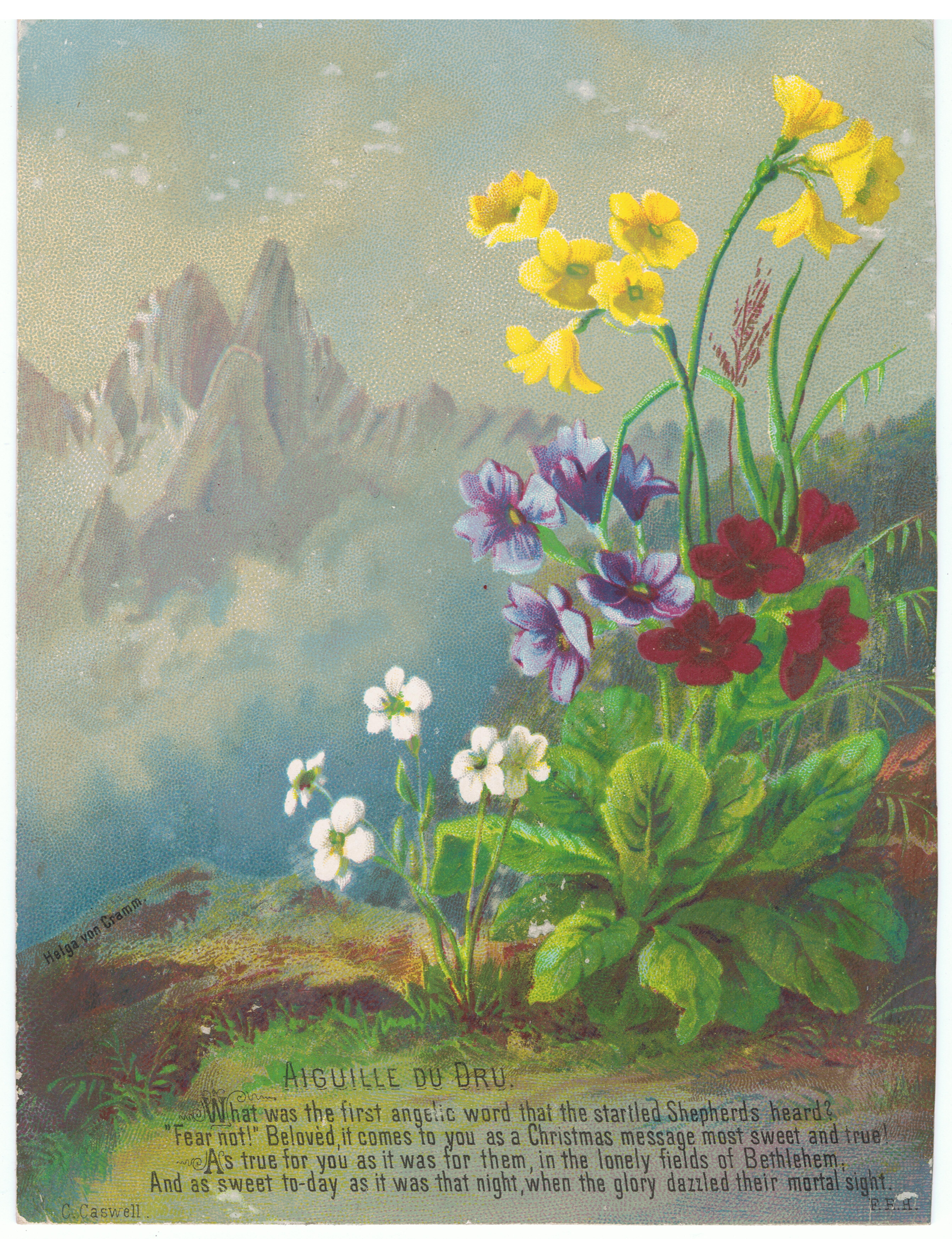
Aiguille du Dru

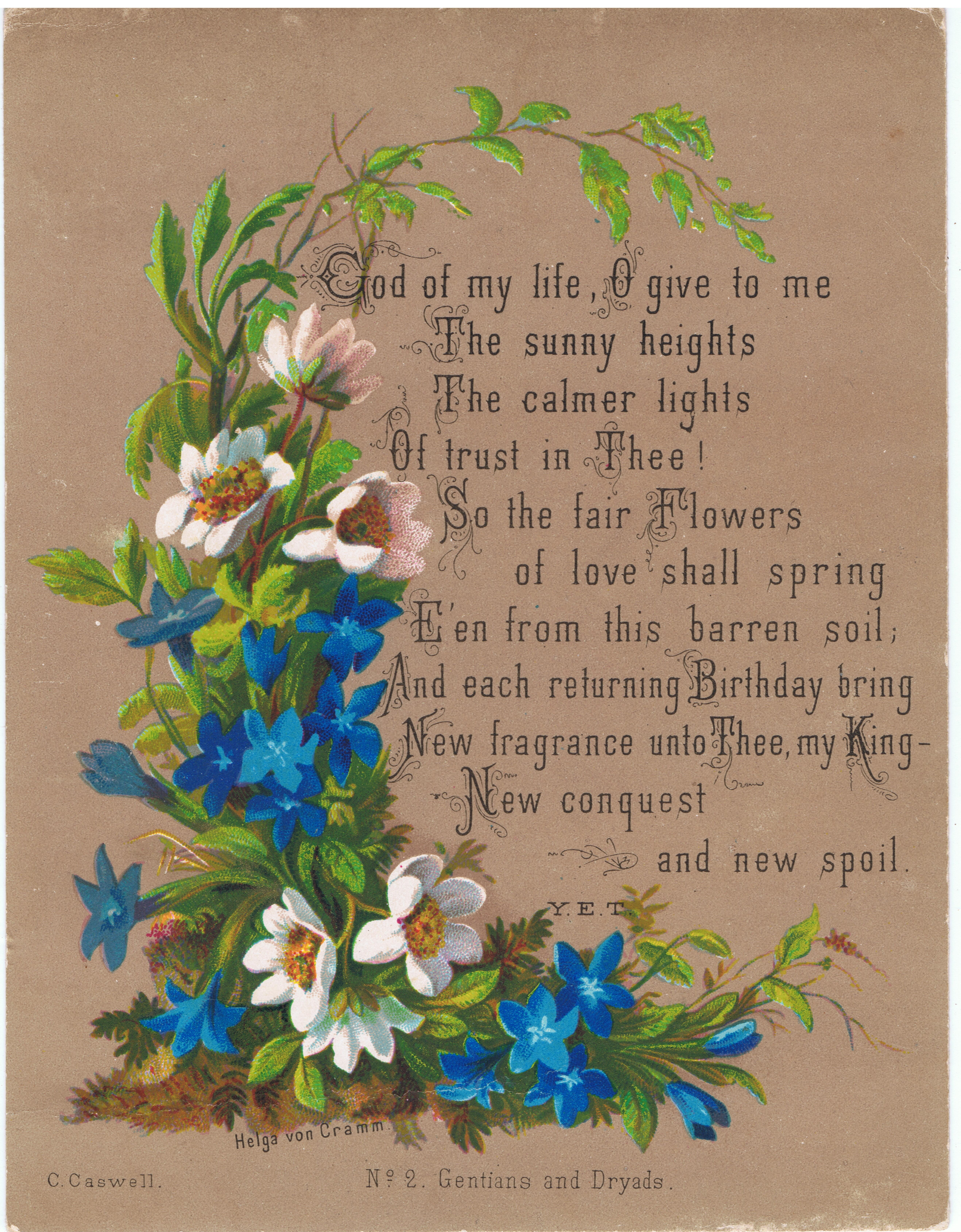
No.2, Gentians and Dryads

== Works ==
=== Known paintings exhibited during her lifetime ===
View of the Dent du Midi, Canton Valais, £21 (SWA, 1877)
The Daubenlake on the Gemmi-Sunrise, £30 (RSBA, 1878)
Varese, £25, & Stressa, Lago Maggiore, £25 (RSBA, 1878)
The Jungfrau, 42 guineas, (RHA, 1878)
Castle of Chillon, £52 (SWA, 1879)
Pitlochrie on the Tummel, £45 (SWA, 1880)
San Terenzo, £63 (SWA, 1882)
Sunset, Zermatt, £25 (SWA, 1883)
The Madonna del Sasso, Lake Maggiore, £40 (SWA, 1892)
Autumn Leaves, Hyde Park, £7 (SWA, 1901)
Madeira, £25 (SWA, 1910)

=== Collaborations with F. R. Havergal ===
The poet Frances (Fanny) Ridley Havergal (1836-1879) and her sister Maria (1821-1887) met von Cramm in Champéry, in the south-western Swiss canton of Valais, in late summer 1876. This led to von Cramm illustrating collections of Havergal's poems between 1879 and 1880.

The meeting is described in the Memorials of Frances Ridley Havergal.

Their meeting also resulted in a sonnet by Havergal:

To Helga. (September 19, 1876, Champéry)
COME down, and show the dwellers far below
What God is painting on each mountain place!
Show His fair colours, and His perfect grace,
Dowering each blossom born of sun and snow :
His tints, not thine ! Thou art God's copyist,
O gifted Helga ! His thy golden height,
Thy purple depth, thy rosy sunset light,
Thy blue snow-shadows, and thy weird white mist.
Reveal His works to many a distant land!
Paint for His praise, oh paint for love of Him!
He is thy Master, let Him hold thy hand,
So thy pure heart, no cloud of self shall dim.
At His dear feet lay down thy laurel store,
Which crimson proof of thy redemption bore.

In The autobiography of Maria Vernon Graham Havergal, the "steep path to Eisenfluh, from whence Helga painted her marvellous [sic] Moonlight on the Jungfrau..." appears. In the same volume a diary entry reads: 24th May 1879, Our friend, the Baroness, left us; but she was not uneasy about Frances. ... Helga's pictures were by her bed... [Fanny said] 'Strangely sweet! tell Helga her pictures take my thoughts away from the pain, -up there' .

== Books containing illustrations by von Cramm ==
- Life Mosaic: The Ministry of song and Under the Surface, by Frances Ridley Havergal (1836-1879), 12 chromo-lithographed plates of Alpine scenery & b/w illustrations throughout, Nisbet & Co, 21 Berners Street, London, 1879.
- Edie's Letter; or, Talks with the little folks, by the Rev. George Everard (1828-1901) [of Wolverhampton, an Evangelical], William Hunt & Co., London, 1879, with engravings from designs by the Baroness Helga von Cramm.
- Sunbeams from the Alpine Heights, 12 chromo-lithographs of Alpine flowers, printed & published by E. Kaufman, Lahr Baden, c1880. 'Illuminated by the Baroness Helga von Cramm'.
- Swiss Letters and Alpine Poems, Frances Ridley Havergal, J. Miriam Crane (ed), 12 chromo-lithographs, James Nisbet & Co., 21 Berners Street, London, 1882.
- Life Chords Comprising Zenith, Loyal Responses, and Other Poems, by Frances Ridley Havergal, 12 chromo-lithographed plates, Nisbet & Co. Ltd., London, 1880 & 1885.
- Life Echoes. [In verse.] ... With a few selected pieces by W. H. Havergal. ... With ... illustrations by the Baroness H. Von Cramm. [With a preface by Maria Vernon Graham Havergal.], London; Edinburgh [printed] : Nisbet & Co., 1883.
- Alpine cards, published by C. Caswell, 135, Broad-street, Birmingham, c. 1880.
- Die ewigen Berg, by Hans Tharau [Anna Thekla von Weling (1837-1900), an Evangelical], Gotha, F. A. Perthes, 1882, six illustrations by Helga v. Cramm. (Ararat, Sinai, Karmel, Horeb, Gilboa, Juda, Zion, Libanon, Ölberg, Golgatha, Predigtberg ...), pps.236.
