= Joyden's Wood =

Woodland in the London Borough of Bexley, England

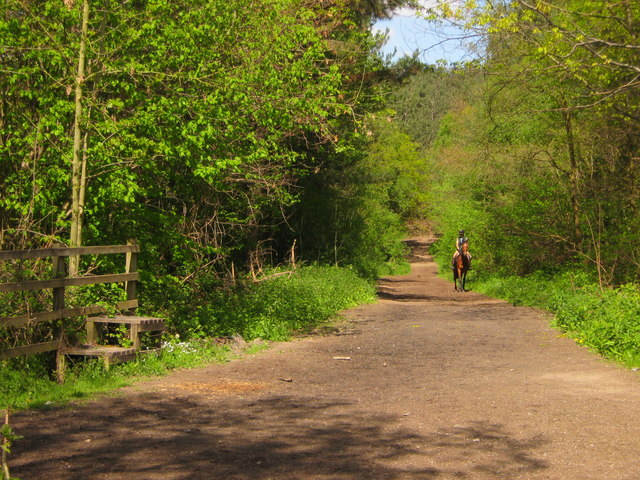

- Location within Greater London

Geography
- Location: London, England
- OS grid: TQ501719
- Coordinates: 51.426°N 0.158°E

Administration
- Authority: Woodland Trust

Joyden's Wood is an area of ancient woodland that straddles the border between the London Borough of Bexley in South East London and the Borough of Dartford in Kent, England. It is located 2.7 miles (4.3 km) north west of Swanley, 3.3 miles (5.3 km) south east of Bexleyheath and 3.6 miles (5.8 km) south west of Dartford. It is one of over 1,000 woodlands in the United Kingdom looked after by the Woodland Trust. The first records of a wood on this site go back to the year 1600. It is also the name of a housing estate to the east of the woodland itself.

== Wildlife ==
There are nine ponds in the wood, each of which is a habitat for the three British newt species, the great crested newt, the smooth newt and the palmate newt.

British birds of prey have been noted in the area including buzzards, sparrowhawks, and kestrels.

In spring, various flowers grow on the woodland floor such as bluebells, sunny yellow celandines and lily of the valley. Autumn sees a range of fungi grow from deadwood and the floor. Amethyst deceiver and lilac bonnet, and the fly agaric. In the winter months, conifer trees grow in abundance.

== Archaeology ==
There are traces of settlements in the forest that are over 2,000 years old, and deneholes have been found. Faesten Dic, ‘the strong dike’, is a boundary feature built around 1,500 years ago by Saxon settlers; it runs for over a kilometre through the forest.

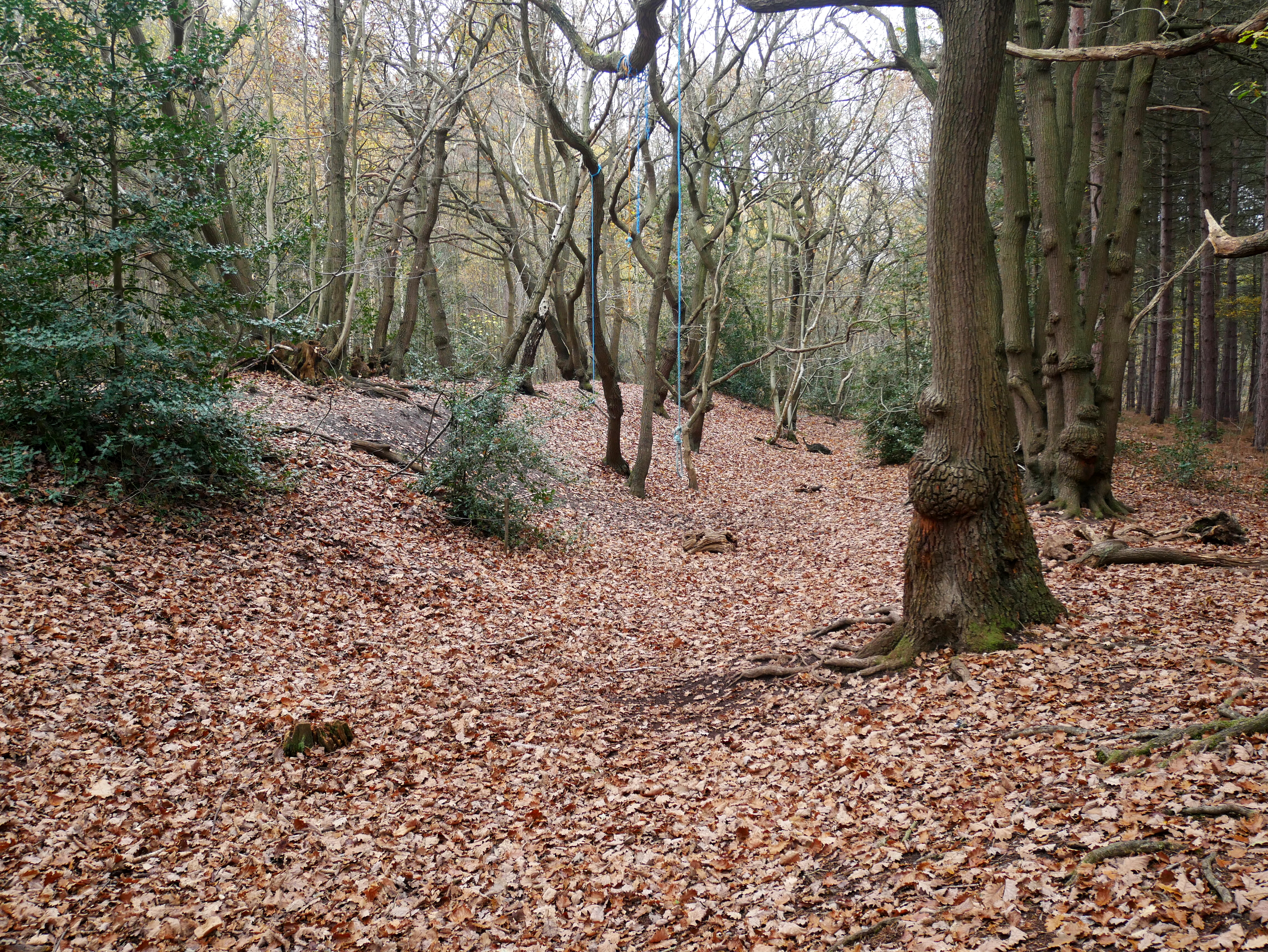
The ditch-and-bank of faesten dic atop Joyden's Wood.

Archaeological investigation during the 1950s has also revealed that a medieval hall flanked by two smaller buildings was present in the area, now underneath an area of housing that is east of Summerhouse Drive and south of Joyden's Wood Road. The hall was likely constructed out of timber with a tiled roof, and the period of occupation has been dated to between circa 1280 and 1320 through an analysis of the pottery found at the site. This reflects the likelihood that the site was inhabited for about two generations, but no longer. It is possible that this building was the Manor of Ocholt, which is known from historical records to have been located nearby and which was owned by Lesnes Abbey. Some of the pottery sherds found were identified as belonging to grey ware produced in the Limpsfield area of Surrey; such Limpsfield ware was supplied to London and northern Kent, having also been found at nearby sites Cray House and Eynsford Castle.

The likely source of fresh water for the hall's inhabitants was a nearby well. A number of earthworks surrounded the hall, although the exact date of these has not been ascertained. Why the hall was abandoned is not clear, but possibilities include a failure in the water supply, a rapid impoverishment of the sandy soil found in the surrounding fields, or the impact of the Black Death. There was no archaeological evidence suggesting that the house might have been devastated by fire.

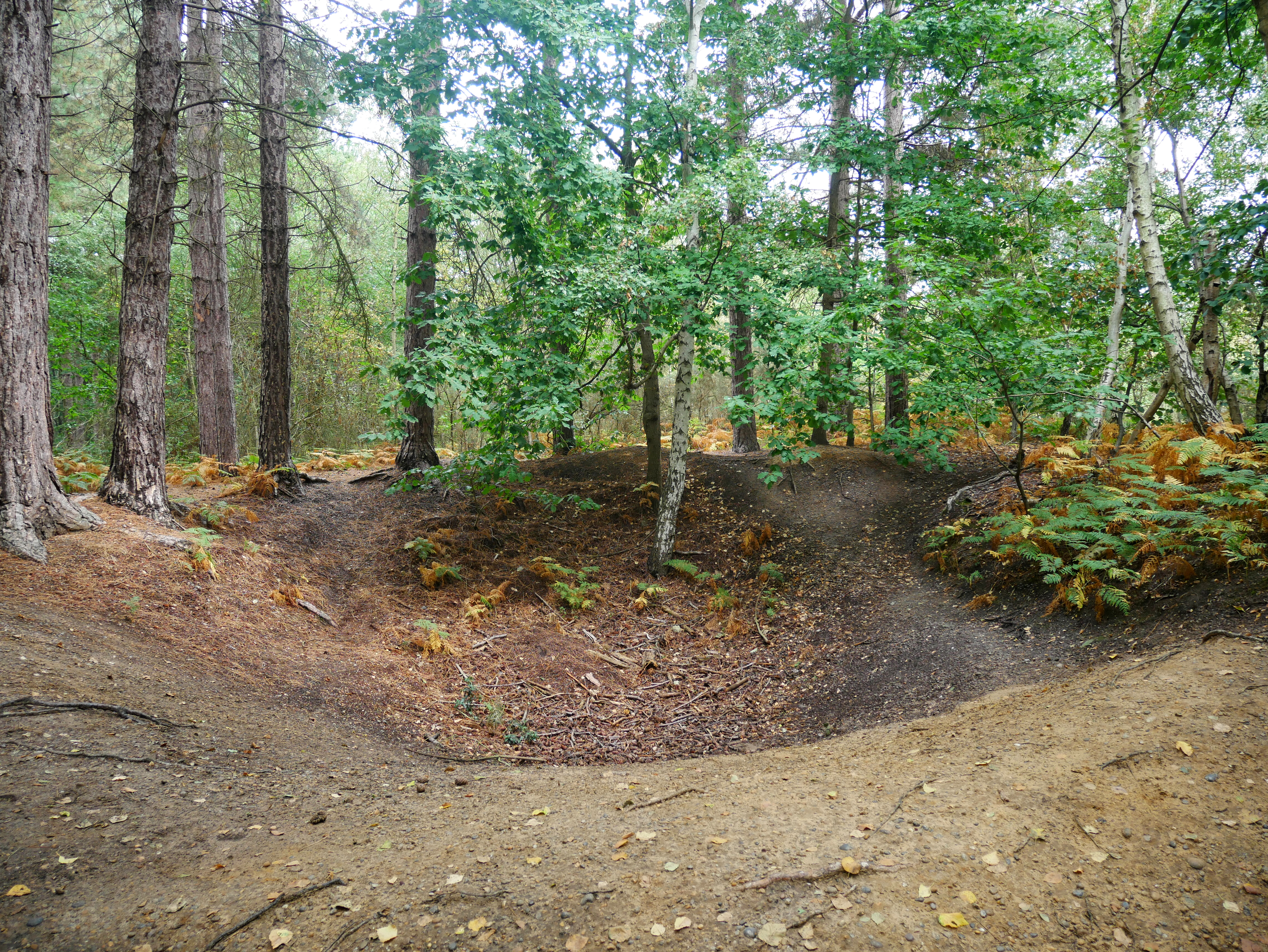
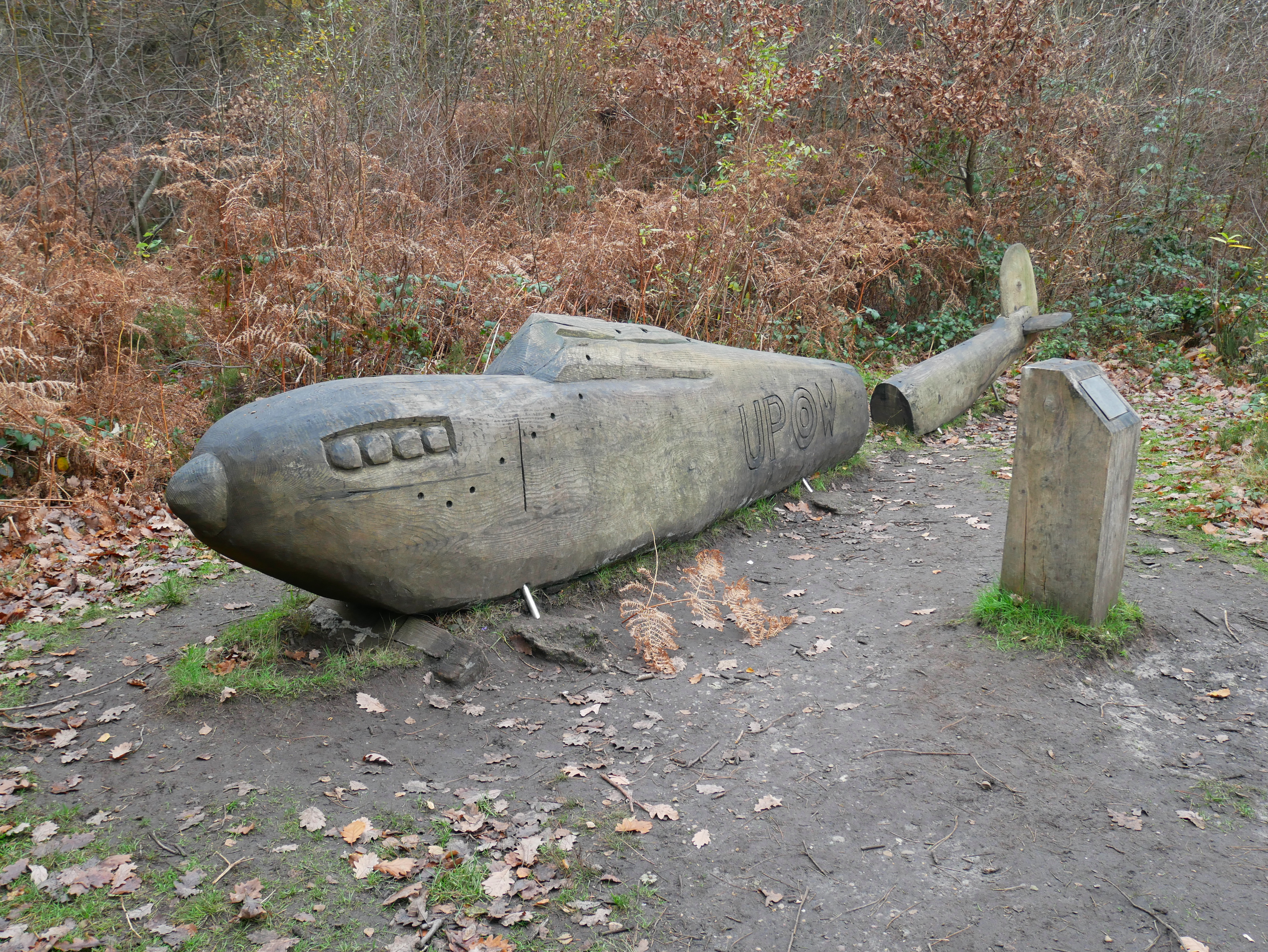
A bomb crater in Joyden's Wood (left) and a wooden sculpture of a crashed RAF Hawker Hurricane (right)

During the Second World War, two RAF Hawker Hurricane fighters crashed in the wood and some hollows visible in the wood are bomb craters. A wooden sculpture of a crashed Hurricane lies just west of Faesten Dic, carved by local sculptor Peter Leadbeater.

== Joyden's Wood Estate ==
Joydens Wood Estate is home to several thousand people. Amenities include a post office, butcher, pharmacy, library, petrol station as well as local infant and junior schools. Community groups that meet at the Joydens Wood Community Centre in Birchwood Drive include a pre-school, a Women's Institute and a table tennis club. St Barnabas' Church in Tile Kiln Lane has a multi-purpose building used both by the church and community groups. The scouts and guides have a hall; there is also a Freeholders' Association. Local authority administration of the estate is split between the London Borough of Bexley within Greater London and the Borough of Dartford within Kent.

== Demography ==
According to the 2011 census, 86% of the population is White British.

== Transport ==
=== Rail ===
The nearest National Rail station to Joyden's Wood is Bexley, located 1.8 miles away.

=== Buses ===
Joyden's Wood is served by Go-Coach route 429 (Monday to Saturday) to Dartford and to West Kingsdown via Swanley and London Buses route B12 to Erith via Bexley & Bexleyheath.

== Nearby areas ==
Joyden's Wood borders Dartford to the north, Wilmington to the north east and east, Hextable to the south east, Swanley to the south, Ruxley to the south west, North Cray to the west and Bexley to the north west.
