= West Kingsdown =

Village in Kent, England

Coordinates: 51.351469°N 0.2552°E

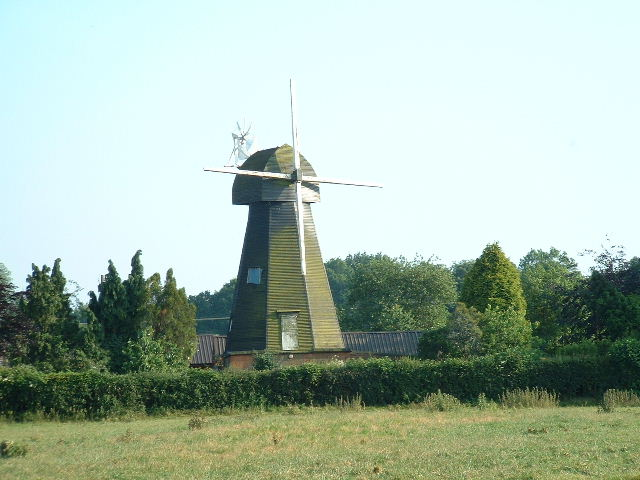
- West Kingsdown Windmill

- Location within Kent
- Population: 6,062 (2011 Census)
- OS grid reference: TQ575635
- Civil parish: West Kingsdown
- District: Sevenoaks
- Shire county: Kent
- Region: South East
- Country: England
- Sovereign state: United Kingdom
- Post town: SEVENOAKS
- Postcode district: TN15
- Dialling code: 01474
- Police: Kent
- Fire: Kent
- Ambulance: South East Coast
- UK Parliament: Sevenoaks

West Kingsdown is a village and civil parish in the Sevenoaks district of Kent, England, on the A20 5 miles (8 km) southeast of Swanley, 5.5 miles (9 km) northeast of Sevenoaks and 22.5 miles (36.2 km) from London. In 2011 it had a population of 6062.

== The area ==
The parish was part of Axstane Hundred and later Dartford Rural District. The village, because of its situation near London, grew considerably after the First World War from a relatively small farming community to a commuter village of around 5000 residents, expanding mainly on the northeast side of the A20. To the southwest of the main village are the rural housing developments of Knatts Valley and East Hill. To the north of the village lies the Brands Hatch motor racing circuit. There are four churches in the village: the parish church of St Edmund King and Martyr; West Kingsdown Baptist Church; the Roman Catholic church of St Bernadette; and Kings Church, an Evangelical church established in 1996.

== History ==
Village

Kingsdown, the former name of West Kingsdown village, traces its origins back to Anglo-Saxon settlements in the woods above the Darenth Valley. Farmers carved out pockets of land for arable farming. The Saxons also provided the name – 'the King's own hill pasture'. There is evidence that the parish church, St Edmund King and Martyr, was originally of Saxon construction. It appears that Edward the Confessor owned Kingsdown and the property passed into the ownership of William I following the Norman Conquest in 1066.

From 1066 to 1630 the ownership of the land in and around Kingsdown passed into the possession of a series of landlords, including Edward IV. From 1630 until 1784 there were absentee landlords. Records from 1664 show there were around 30 houses in the parish, so the population may have been around 150 people, a third of whom were too poor to pay tax. A census in 1676 recorded 90 people aged over 16. No-one was, or admitted to being – a Roman Catholic or a nonconformist. In this period roads through the village grew in importance and a turnpike was set up on what is now the A20 to provide income. Around 1780 the route was realigned, making it easier to travel through the village.

At the first national census in 1801 the population was recorded as 337. By 1901 the population had only risen to 506, falling to 407 in 1911 and 427 in 1927. In 1874 a National School was built on what is now School Lane. Post the First World War the relatively stable farming community became a scattering of holiday homes, garages, shacks and smallholdings as commuters settled outside London and found homes in the countryside. In 1918 there were two shopkeepers in the village. By 1938 there were six garages, nine shops and ten cafes.

Between 1921 and 1981 the number of Kingsdown residents grew substantially to nearly 5000. Cul-de-sac construction added to the existing roads and several park home estates were built for older residents. A new primary school on Fawkham Road was built to take the growing number of children. Electricity was introduced in 1937 but mains drainage was only installed in 1968. During this period Brands Hatch Farm opened its land to cyclists for racing, the precursor to Brands Hatch Racing Circuit. The A20 was widened to a dual carriageway (subsequently reduced to single carriageway) and the trees that lined the road lost to the village. The construction of the M20, taking traffic to Dover, meant that the village was no longer a major thoroughfare for cars, coaches and lorries.

In 1948 Kingsdown changed its name at the request of the Post Office to avoid confusion with other villages in east Kent with the same name and became West Kingsdown.

Churches

A mention of a church at Kingsdown – the present St Edmund King and Martyr Church of England church – is found in tax records of 1287. The original construction, a Saxon church, was possibly constructed just before 1066, perhaps around 1030. It is possible that the church was the chapel built for the lord of the manor and served a small number of Saxon families who lived in huts around the church. The early building was a relatively simple structure built in stone and flint, comprising a nave, chancel and square tower. Extensions to the church were made in the twelfth century but these proved something of a disaster, weakening the building, and in the thirteenth century these were either demolished or fell down. The repairs were subsequently hidden by rendering, which was in turn later removed in the early 1900s. One of the interesting features of the church is the depiction of the story of Cain and Abel around one of the windows, which is dated around 1100.

In a census carried out in 1676 to establish how many Roman Catholics and nonconformists there were in the village no-one was, or admitted to being, a Roman Catholic or a nonconformist. In 1861 a toolshed was brought from the railway junction at Swanley to the site of the present Baptist Church on Fawkham Road and the Baptist Church was established as a visible part of the community. Based on other evidence it is reasonable to assume that there had been a Baptist community in the village from the 1830/1840s onwards, possibly as a result of a revival in North Kent at the beginning of the century. There are records of a congregation of 76 people meeting in 1851. The new 'toolshed church' was erected on Fawkham Road, close to the junction with the London-Dover Road (A20). It opened officially on Wednesday, 11 December 1861. The toolshed was demolished in 1980 and a new Baptist church and church hall erected on the site by the church members, opening officially on 4 July 1981. The entrance to the church was refurbished in 2010.

Both the Roman Catholic church of St Bernadette and Kings Church, closed in 2015, were established in the village in the late 1900s.

Windmill

West Kingsdown Windmill is a Grade II listed smock mill that was built in the early nineteenth century at Farningham. The windmill was marked on Greenwoods map of 1821 and the Farningham Tithe Map of 1840. In 1880, it was moved to Kingsdown, where there was already a post mill. The post mill burnt down in May 1909. The windmill is located on the east side of the village, off Pells Lane.

== Sport ==
Brands Hatch motor racing circuit is located off the A20 on the north side of West Kingsdown. The circuit was used in 1926 as a grass track for bike riding and the first race held there in 1928 – a race between competitors riding bicycles and cross-country runners. The track hosted Formula 1 racing between 1964 and 1986 and runs major motor sport events during the year. In 2012 Brands Hatch was the venue for the Paralympic Games road cycling.

== Transport ==
=== Rail ===
The closest National Rail stations to West Kingsdown are Eynsford and Kemsing, each located 4.6 miles away.

=== Buses ===
West Kingsdown is served by GoBus route 429 to Dartford via Farningham, Swanley, Joyden's Wood & Wilmington.

== Notable people ==
Olympian Lizzy Yarnold comes from West Kingsdown.

FIA Formula One Race Director Charlie Whiting is from West Kingsdown.

Para-athlete and commonwealth games silver medalist Johnboy Smith lives in West Kingsdown (see www.johnboysmith.com) .

== See also ==
- List of places of worship in Sevenoaks District
- Listed buildings in West Kingsdown
