= Maplescombe =

Hamlet in Kent, England

Coordinates: 51.3558°N 0.2396°E

- Location within Kent
- Civil parish: West Kingsdown
- District: Sevenoaks
- Shire county: Kent
- Region: South East
- Country: England
- Sovereign state: United Kingdom
- Post town: Dartford
- Postcode district: DA4
- Police: Kent
- Fire: Kent
- Ambulance: South East Coast
- UK Parliament: Sevenoaks

Maplescombe is a hamlet in the West Kingsdown civil parish, in the Sevenoaks District, in the county of Kent, England.

== Location ==
It is about eight miles northeast of the town of Sevenoaks and is near the large village of Kemsing and about half a mile from the village of West Kingsdown.

== Transport ==
For transport there is the A20 road, the A225 road, the M20 motorway, the M26 motorway and the M25 motorway nearby. The nearest railway station is Otford railway station, about four miles away.
