= Eden Valley Museum =

Museum in Kent, England

Coordinates: 51.1962°N 0.0650°E

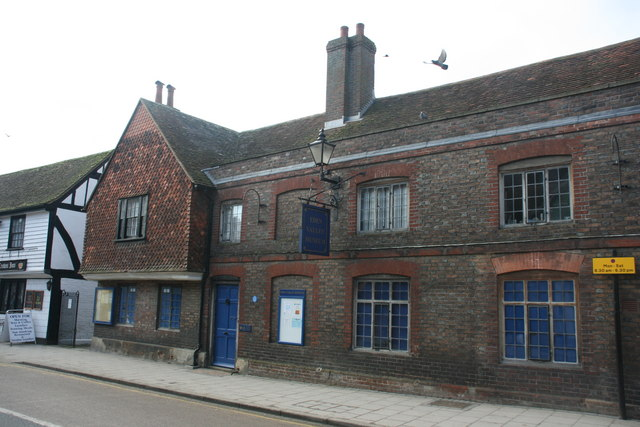
The museum in 2010

The Eden Valley Museum is a local history museum in the market town of Edenbridge, Kent in England. The museum is housed within a Grade II* listed medieval farmhouse. The museum holds notable collections demonstrating the history of cricket ball making, tanning as well as archaeology and an extensive archive of local information. The museum is also notable as the home of a needlework box made by a German POW during World War Two. The box was featured as part of the BBC's 'A History of the World in 100 Objects' project.

== Church House ==
The museum building itself is a Grade II* listed timber-framed house dating from 1380 to 1410. It was initially an open Hall house but was extensively re-built during the 16th century to add a first floor and chimney. In the late 18th and early 19th century the front of the building was clad in brick. Today the timber framed bones of the building are invisible from the outside. Known today as Church House, the house was originally known as Doggetts Farm until 1913 when Miss Geraldine Rickards converted it and added Rickards Hall adjoining to the west. In 1921 Miss Rickards gave the house to the Parish Church for community use. Church House has been a Grade II* listed building since 1954. The Museum was established following an exhibition in 1995 marking the centenary of the Edenbridge Town Council, organised by the Edenbridge and District Historical Society. In 1997 the Eden Valley Museum Trust was formed to develop and run a museum for the Edenbridge area. The Trust was granted charitable status in November 1997, and with the aid of a grant from the Heritage Lottery Fund the Museum opened in 2000. The Museum is a registered charity. Church House is held on lease from Edenbridge Town Council. Admission to the Museum has been free since 2004.

== Collections ==
Run mainly by local volunteers, the museum is home to collections that cover a range of topics on the Eden Valley from its early origins to recent times. These permanent displays, describing the topography, people, communities and trades are spread over several rooms and are updated regularly. In addition one or two temporary exhibitions are mounted each year lasting from 12 to 18 months.

The museum has one of the most extensive collections of material relating to Whitmore's Tannery, historically the biggest employer in Edenbridge until its closure in 1974. Other displays include items used in the cricket ball manufacturing industry of Chiddingstone Causeway, archaeology, farming, iron smelting, brick making, hop growing and other industries from the surrounding area. A large photographic collection, together with archival material relating to properties and local organisations, former residents and local families are major sources of information for local historians and family researchers, and are continually being augmented.

== Area of interest ==
The defined geographical collecting area largely incorporates the parishes of Edenbridge, Chiddingstone, Cowden, Hever, Kent (including Four Elms and Mark Beech) and Penshurst and Crockham Hill (part of the Parish of Westerham).
