= Church of St Peter and St Paul, Edenbridge =

Anglican parish in Kent, England

Coordinates: 51.1961°N 0.0665°E

Church of St Peter and St Paul
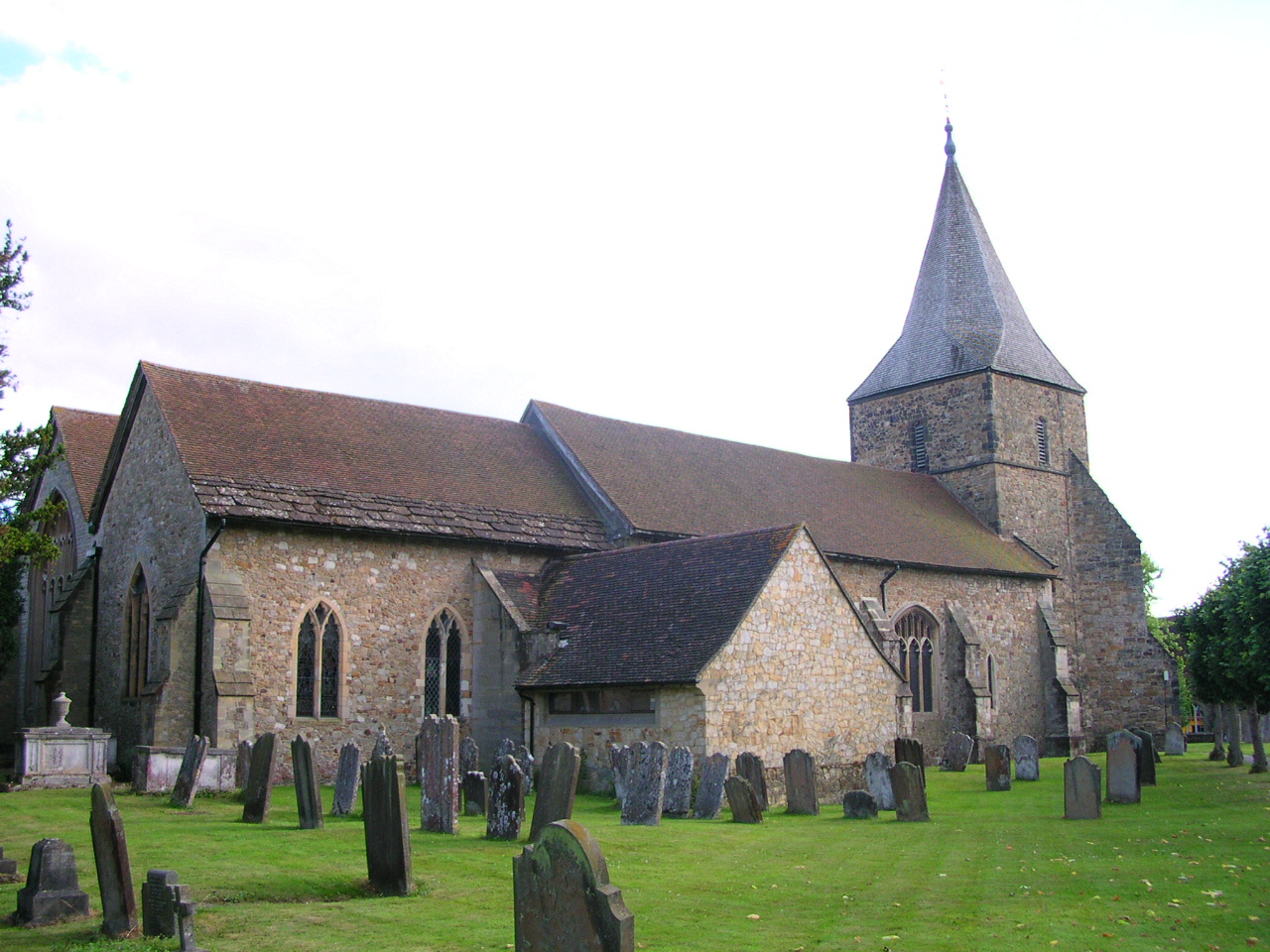

- Location within Kent
- OS grid reference: TQ 44490 46130
- Location: Edenbridge, Kent
- Country: England
- Denomination: Church of England
- Website: edenbridgeparishchurch.org

History
- Status: Parish church

Architecture
- Heritage designation: Grade I listed building
- Designated: 10 September 1954

Administration
- Diocese: Rochester
- Deanery: Tonbridge
- Parish: Edenbridge

Clergy
- Vicar: Rev’d Dr Stephen Mitchell

The Anglican Church of St Peter and St Paul in Edenbridge, Kent, England was built in the late 11th or early 12th century. It is a Grade I listed building.

Some parts of the nave date from the 11th or 12th century, however most of the building has been replaced, with particular rebuilding in the 15th and 19th centuries.

The sandstone building has a Broach spire. The interior includes font, piscina and pulpit and stained glass by Edward Burne-Jones.

== History ==
The first church on the site was probably Anglo-Saxon. The oldest part of the current fabric is the west end of the nave which dates from the 11th or early 12th century. The aisle had been added by the 13th century when the tower and chancel chapel were added. In the 15th century, as part of extensive rebuilding which included the construction of the chancel arcade, the chapel was replaced to contain the tomb of Richard Martyn who died in 1499. A panel from the tomb was later incorporated into the east wall behind the altar. During the medieval period the church was a chapel to Westerham. A Victorian restoration around 1860 included a design for a new vestry by Charles Ainslie, with further restoration being undertaken in the 20th century.

The Church of England parish of Edenbridge is part of the Tonbridge deanery, within the Diocese of Rochester.

== Architecture ==
The building is of sandstone from the Tunbridge Wells Sand Formation. It has a tiled roof and consists of a nave with a south aisle and porch, a chancel with a south chapel and a vestry to the north. The 13th century west tower has a Broach spire, supported by buttresses, and a clock face with a single hour hand. The tower contains eight bells with the largest tenor bell weighing 714 kilograms (1,574 lb). The bells and frame was cast and installed by Gillett & Johnston in 1911.

The interior includes a stained glass window of the crucifixion by Sir Edward Burne-Jones in the east wall. It was crafted by Morris & Co. and originally intended for Holy Trinity Church in nearby Crockham Hill but installed in Edenbridge in 1909. The church contains examples of medieval wall paintings dating from the 14th century.

The font is from the 13th century, with the cover being added in the 14th or 15th, and there is a 14th-century piscina. The Jacobean pulpit was built between 1630 and 1640.

In the adjoining cemetery is the grave of the architect Baillie Scott and his wife. The entrance to the churchyard has a lychgate.
