= River Eden, Kent =

River in Surrey and Kent, England

Eden Broadmead Water (section)
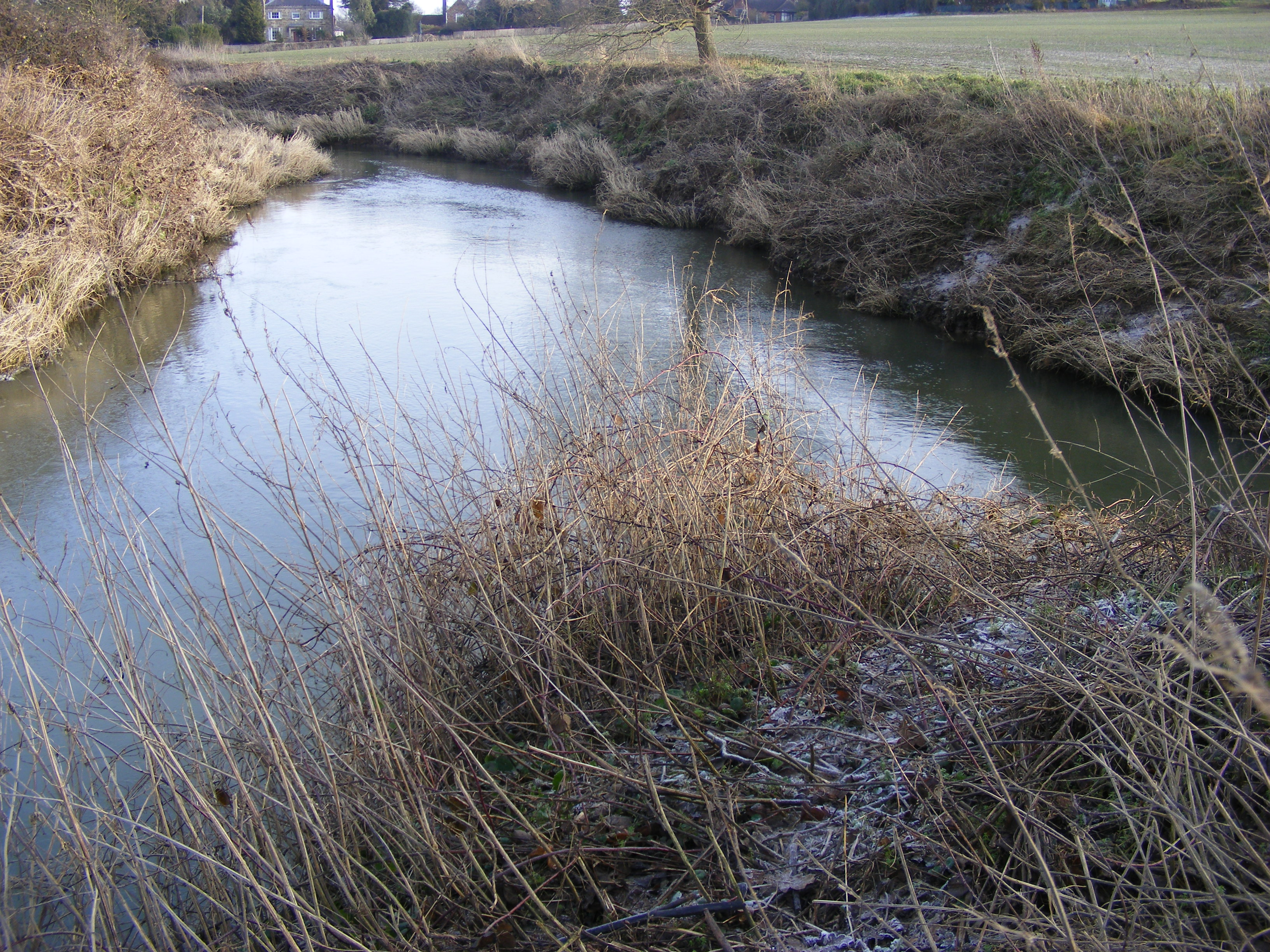
- The mouth of the River Eden, where it joins the River Medway in Penshurst, Kent

- Rivers in Kent

Location
- Country: England
- Region: Kent

Physical characteristics
- Source
  - location: Titsey, Surrey
  - coordinates: 51°16′37″N 0°02′12″E
- Mouth: confluence with River Medway
  - location: Penshurst, Kent
  - coordinates: 51°10′12″N 0°11′04″E

Basin features
- Tributaries
  - left: Gibbs Brook, Eden Brook
  - right: Kent Brook

The River Eden is a tributary of the River Medway in south east England. It rises at the foot of the North Downs escarpment near Titsey in Surrey and runs initially southwards through Oxted before turning eastwards to enter Kent. After flowing through Edenbridge and passing Hever Castle, the Eden meets the Medway at Penshurst.

The name 'Eden' is a back-formation from Edenbridge, (Eadhelmsbrigge (Eadhelm's Bridge) in Old English).

== Course ==
The Eden rises at the foot of the North Downs in Titsey parish, Surrey (grid reference TQ 420 551), about 350 metres north of Clacket Lane motorway services. It initially runs southwestwards through Oxted, before turning south. From its source to its confluence with the Gibbs Brook (which it meets to the north of Crowhurst), the Eden is also known as the Broadmead Water.

Downstream of Haxted Mill, the river meets its principal tributary, the Eden Brook, and turns eastwards to enter Kent above Edenbridge. The river continues to flow eastwards, feeding the ornamental lake at Hever Castle, before turning southeastwards to meet the Medway at Penshurst.

Much of the catchment area of the Eden lies on Weald Clay.

== Water quality ==
According to the Environmental Change Network, water quality in the Eden is mainly classified as General Quality Assessment (GQA) Class C, although the headwaters near Oxted are Class D. The river receives treated sewage effluent from two Southern Water sewage treatment works (STW), serving Edenbridge and Oxted respectively; the stretches receiving these effluents are both subject to EC Urban Water Treatment "Sensitive Waters" investigations. There are other, much smaller, private sewage treatment works throughout the catchment. The river and its tributaries support coarse fisheries. Average flows at Penshurst range from 3.909 m^{3}/s in January to 0.485 m^{3}/s in July. Water to fill Bough Beech Reservoir, owned by SES Water, is pumped from a point just upstream of Penshurst.

Water quality of the River Eden in 2019:

Section	Ecological Status	Chemical Status	Overall Status	Length	Catchment	Channel
Upper Eden	Poor	Fail	Poor	6.873 km (4.271 mi)	22.808 km^{2} (8.806 sq mi)	
Middle Eden	Moderate	Fail	Moderate	8.611 km (5.351 mi)	15.143 km^{2} (5.847 sq mi)	Heavily modified
Lower Eden	Moderate	Fail	Moderate	26.99 km (16.77 mi)	79.807 km^{2} (30.814 sq mi)	Heavily modified

== Watermills ==
The River Eden powered a number of watermills. From source to the Medway they were:

=== Titsey Mill ===
This was an old manorial mill. A Roman Villa at Titsey was converted into a fulling mill.

=== Limpsfield Mill ===
TQ 404 534 51°15′44″N 0°00′41″E

The 1868 ordnance survey map identifies the site of this pre-conquest mill from the position of its sluice. This has been renewed and the pond is occasionally in water.

=== Tidy Green Mill, Limpsfield ===
This was a Domesday site, the mill at Limenensfeld then being valued at 2s. This mill may take its name from the Tydye/Tidy family. This mill was demolished in 1892.

=== Upper Mill, Oxted ===
TQ 386 523 51°15′10″N 0°00′50″W

This mill was demolished in the late 18th century; by 1817 the site of the millpond was used for cottages.

=== Middle Mill, Oxted ===
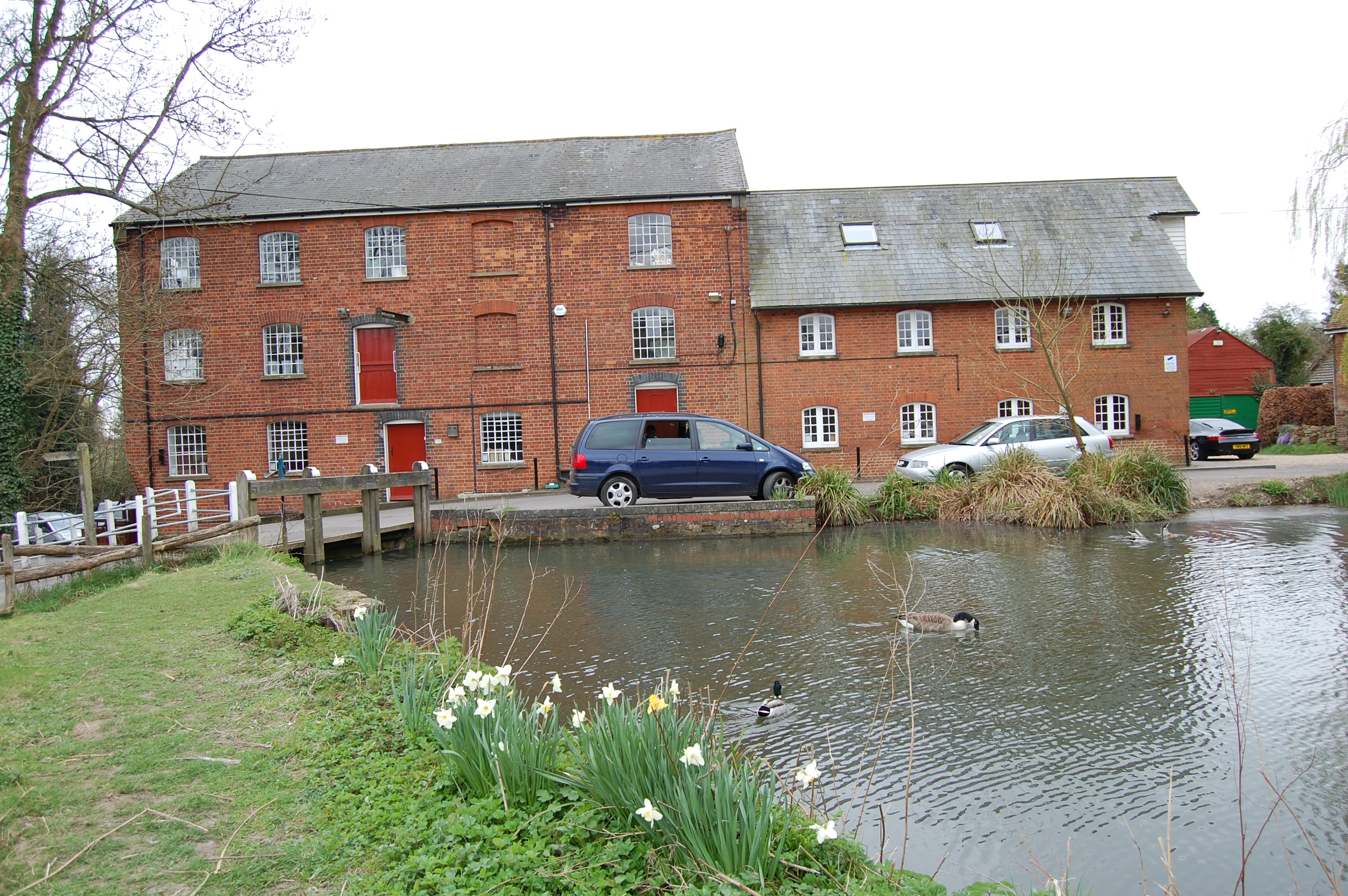
Middle Mill

TQ 390 513 51°14′55″N 0°00′35″W

The surviving corn mill building, now just "Oxted Mill", has been converted into offices. It dates from 1892-5, although on a site in use from much earlier. Originally two buildings, the older one housed an overshot wheel of 12 feet (3.7 m) diameter, breadth 5 feet 6 inches (1.7 m). The newer mill, opened on 12 June 1893, was a roller mill driven by a 4 feet (1.2 m) turbine producing 63 horsepower (47 kW) at 63 revolutions per minute. The building was used as a factory for making woodworking tools in the 1950s.

=== Coltsford (Cottsford) Mill, Oxted ===
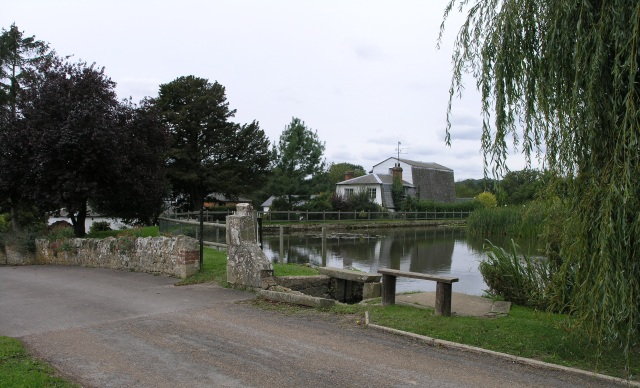
Coltsford Mill

TQ 397 506 51°14′15″N 0°00′08″E

A Domesday site. This mill retains its machinery, which dates from c.1860 and is all cast iron. The mill is used as a corporate event centre, and there is a trout fishery nearby. The cast iron waterwheel still turns.

=== Mill site ===
This mill stood just downstream of Coltsford mill, it may have been known as "Crowherstmelle".

=== Haxted Mill, Edenbridge ===
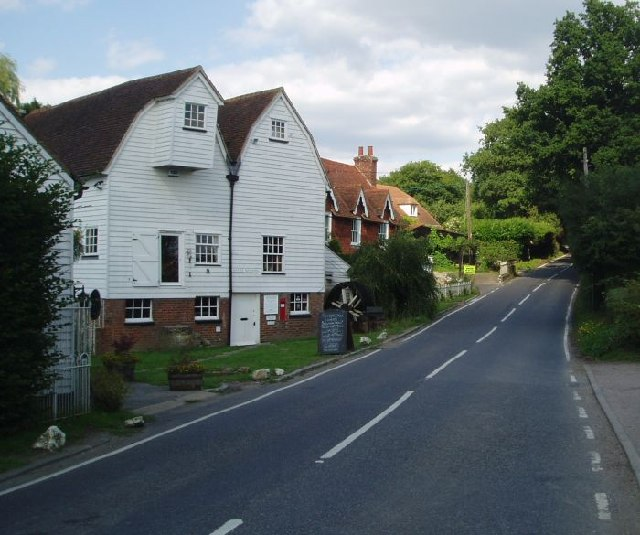
Haxted Mill

TQ 418 455 51°11′28″N 0°01′49″E

Haxted Watermill stands in Surrey close to the borders with Kent. It is a Domesday site and the mill was mentioned in the will of Sir Reginald de Cobham in 1361. The western half of the building dates to c.1580 and the eastern half dates to 1794. The mill was last used to grind flour in 1919 but worked until 1945. It was turned into a museum in 1969 but is now a brasserie and bar.

The current overshot waterwheel has a diameter of 10 feet (3.0 m) and a width of 9 feet (2.7 m). It was installed in about 1830, but by 1972 the 72 iron buckets had failed and were replaced by fibreglass replicas. The bearing-stone for an earlier, undershot waterwheel was found during renovation and this dates to the 14th century. In full working order the current wheel produced about 11 horsepower (8.2 kW), rotating at 8 r.p.m. and driving three pairs of millstones, through gearing, at 120 r.p.m. The pit wheel and wallower are of the same date as the waterwheel, but the great spur wheel, made of oak with applewood teeth, has been dated to 1580. The mill originally operated three pairs of millstones, but in the later years of its working life one pair was removed.

=== Town (Honour's) Mill, Edenbridge ===
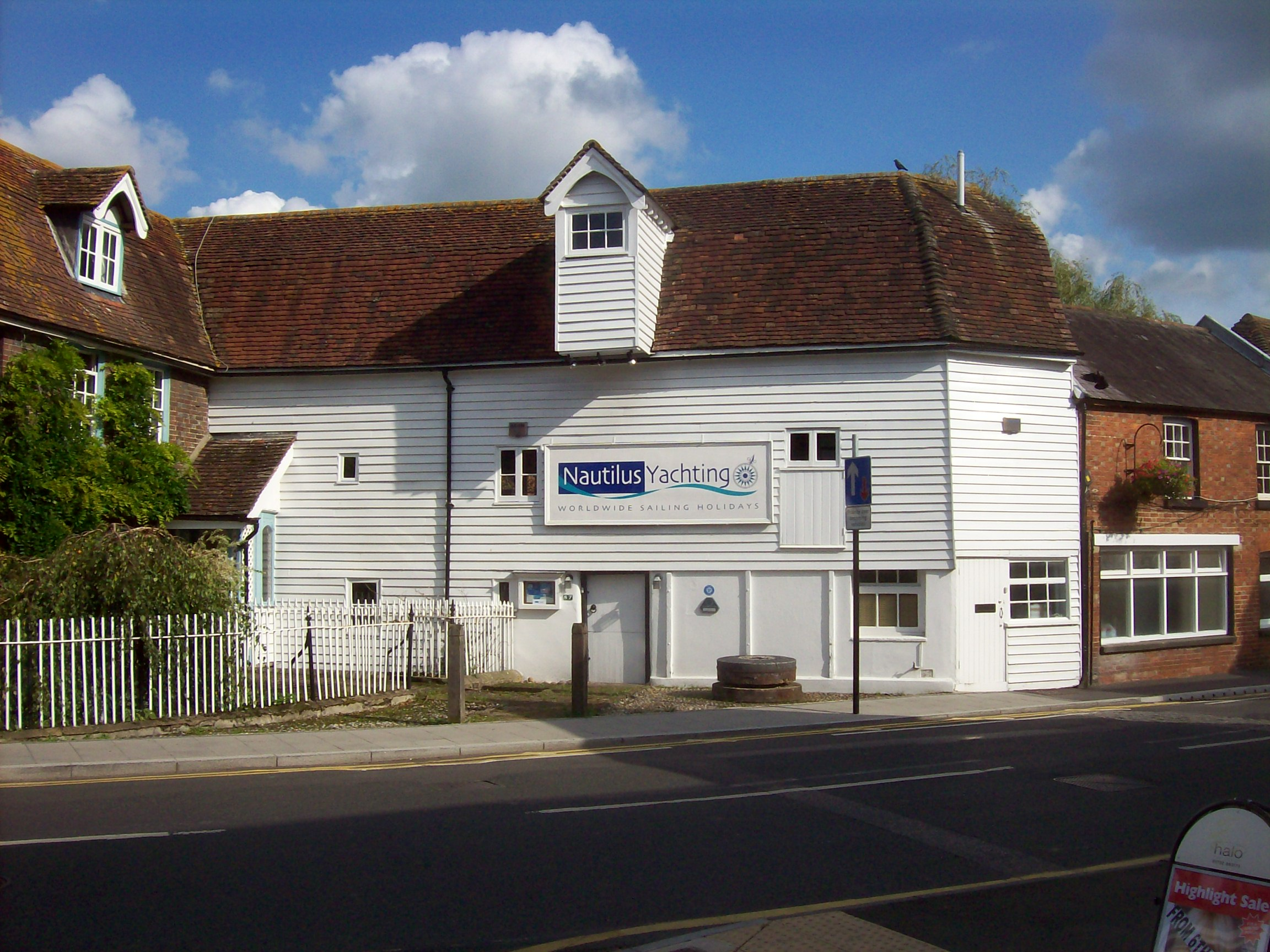
Honour's Mill in 2008

In 1291 a water powered pump was at work here, draining the marshland between Lingfield and Edenbridge. The present corn mill building dates to the early 19th century, but incorporates parts of an older structure. The cast iron low breastshot waterwheel drove three pairs of stones. The mill last ground by water sometime before the First World War, and was working by electricity into the 1970s. The waterwheel was used to work ancillary machinery until 1968, when the cast iron pit wheel was broken in the floods of that year.

=== Hever Castle Mill ===
There was a corn mill at Hever Castle.

=== Chiddingstone (Cranstead) Mill ===
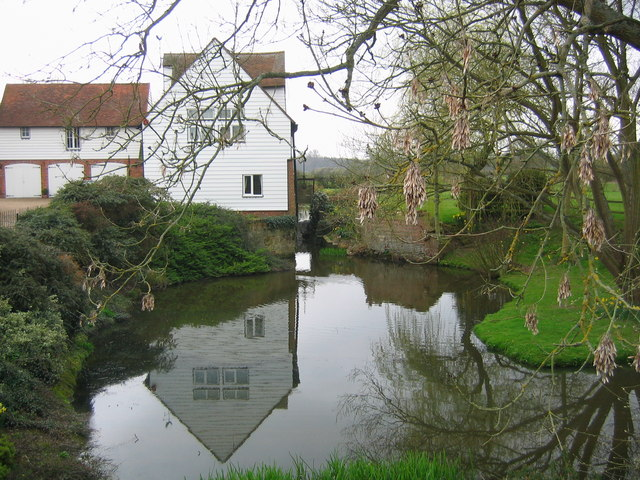
Chiddingstone Mill, now house-converted

TQ 496 461 51°11′40″N 0°08′31″E

Possibly a Domesday site. In the 18th century, the millers were the Keeys family, Richard c.1740, followed by his son Richard. In 1840, the mill was owned by Henry Streatfield and in the occupation of James Young. The wife of his son James Jr died in 1853, James Jr was describes as being "of Chiddingstone mill". The mill was last worked in the 1930s.

This mill was a derelict shell for many years, but the building has now been house converted. No machinery survives. A picture of the mill before conversion can be seen here and more pictures can be seen here.

=== Vexour Park mill ===
TQ 511 454 approx 51°11′16″N 0°09′47″E

A weir in Vexour Park marks the site of a long vanished watermill.

== Tributaries ==
The main tributaries of the Eden are the Gibbs Brook, Eden Vale Stream, and the Eden Brook, which has the Felbridge Water as a tributary. The Kent Brook, which forms the boundary between Surrey and Kent for part of its length, joins near Edenbridge.

== Watermills on the tributaries ==
Various tributaries also powered watermills:

=== Gibbs Brook ===
The Gibbs Brook, formerly known as the Gippes River powered four watermills.

==== Ivy Mill, Godstone. ====
This mill belonged to the manor of Chevington in Bletchley. In 1698 the owner was George Whatman, the mill being partly rebuilt in that year. A photograph of Ivy Mill in 1898 can be seen here. It was burnt down in the 1920s.

==== Leigh Mill, Godstone ====
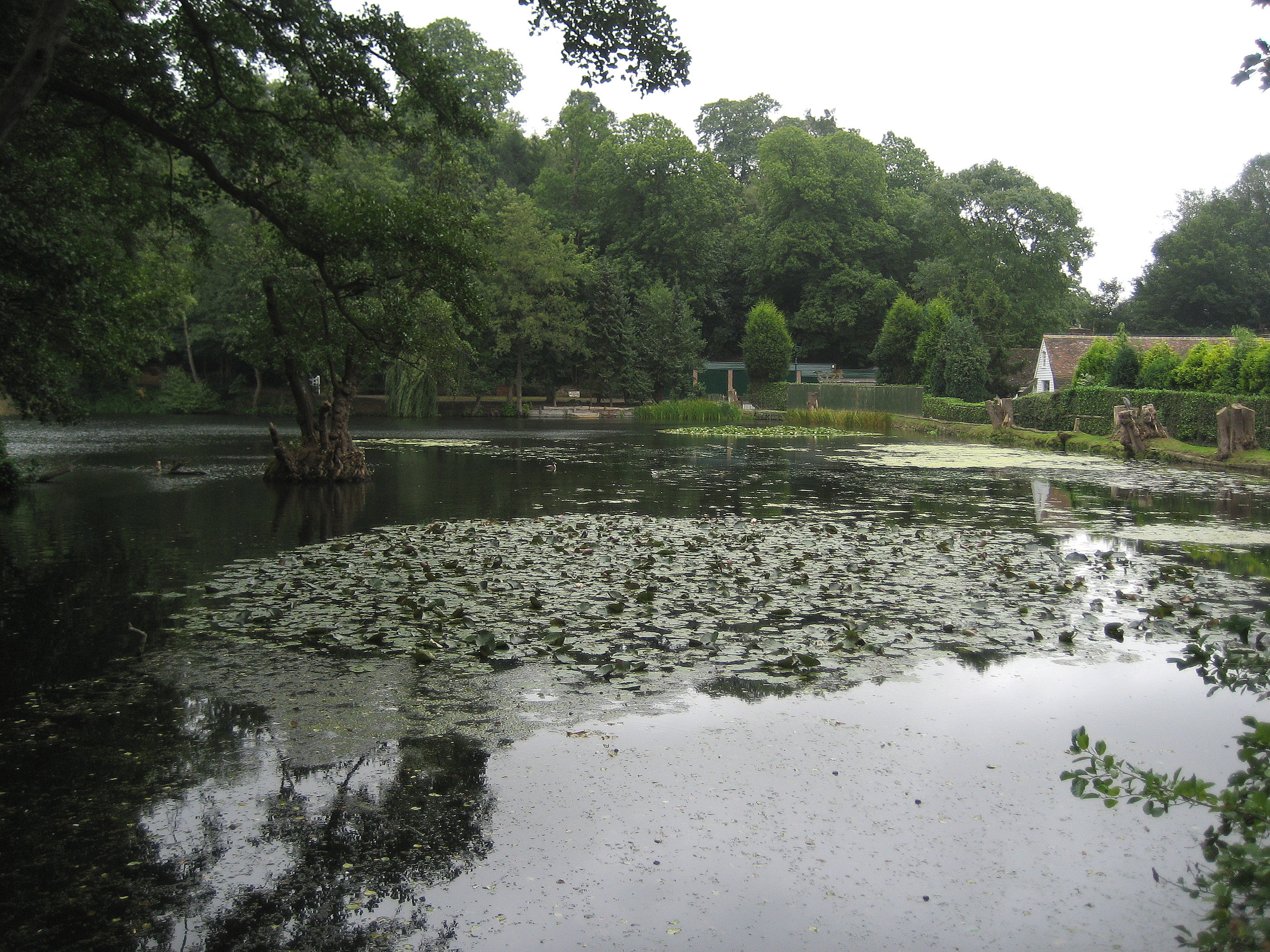
Sluicegates and pond, Leigh mill

This Domesday mill was valueless in 1349, as all the soke tenants had perished in the plague. It had previously been worth 20s or 30s per year. In the Elizabethan times the mill was used as a gunpowder mill, in the ownership of George Evelyn, grandfather of diarist John Evelyn. On 28 January 1589 Evelyn was granted a wide-ranging royal licence to explore for saltpetre, a principal ingredient, and his mills at Godstone were the most important in the country. The mill has been house converted, only the axle and pit wheel remaining of the machinery.

=== Eden Brook ===
The Eden Brook powered three watermills.

==== Hedgecourt Mill, Felbridge ====
TQ 359 404 51°08′48″N 0°03′22″W

This was an old hammer mill site. The mill was first mentioned in 1562 when John Thorpe was listed as repairing buildings, the mill and banks to the value of £64. He was leasing the manor of Hedgecourt from the Gage family of Firle at the time. In 1567 John Thorpe took out a 21 year lease on the mill, the mills being described as "newly erected" and having an overshot waterwheel. In 1594, the mill was in the tenancy of Thomas Thorpe, son of John Thorpe. In 1652, the mill was in the tenancy of Robert Filkes of Godstone. In 1663, John Finch took out an eleven-year lease on Hedgecourt Mill. A toll chest is mentioned in the lease, indicating that the mill was a corn mill, at least in part. He was still there in 1669, paying a half-yearly rent of £14 and tax of 2/-. By March 1670 Joseph Marchant had joined him, but he died in 1674. His widow Sarah took out a lease on the mill in October of that year. The mill passed to her son John in 1688. In 1701, Joseph Marchant (son of John) was at the mill. He built or extended a house in 1701, possibly an extension to the mill. In 1723, Joseph Marchant renewed his lease on the mill and in 1739 James Marchant (son of Joseph) took a sixty-year lease with William Clayton of Marden on 6 acres (24,000 m^{2}) of Hedgecourt Heath in Horne, on which to erect a windmill. The mill was an open trestle post mill. Joseph Marchant seems to have retired by 1742. An unexecuted lease of 1743 mentions that the miller has permission to take timber for the purpose of making charcoal (used in the smelting of iron). The site remained in the ownership of the Gage family until 1745, when Colonel Edward Evelyn bought it. It was a furnace mill at that time.

Edward Evelyn commissioned a map of his new estate. This was drawn by J Bourd of Tunbridge Wells, Kent in 1748. James Marchant was still at the mill in 1773, when he bequeathed all his possessions to his brother Benjamin Marchant, a cooper and innkeeper of Cheam, Surrey. James Marchant seems to have retired in the 1780s. The next known millers were Messrs Stenning, Lock and Stone are recorded as paying rent for the Mill at Hedgecourt. This can only be the watermill as the windmill had gone by 1789. Thomas Stone was the miller in 1814, followed by his son John, who was joined by Laurence Hardy by 1822. John Saunders was the miller in 1840, having previously been at Wiremill. Saunders was still at the mill in 1855 when it was sold by Lady Selina Charlotte, Viscountess Milton to George Gatty. At that time the mill had an 11 feet (3.35 m) diameter overshot waterwheel driving two pairs of millstones. John Tully Coomber had joined Saunders by 1858, working the mill until at least 1861. George Gatty died in 1864 and the mill passed to his son Charles Henry Gatty. Robert Bartley was the miller in 1869, working the mill until at least 1871 and then Sydney Killick was the miller in 1881, followed by Thomas Colvin who was there in 1891. Charles Gatty died in 1903, and the mill passed to two of his cousins, Charles Lane Sayer and Alfred Leighton Sayer. The mill was probably still operable at this time. In 1910 the mill was sold to Percy Portway Harvey, and in 1916 the mill was in the ownership of Henry Willis Rudd, later passing to a Belgian by the name of Mr Honore Dubar.

The mill was visited by Robert Thurston Hopkins in 1926, the machinery still being intact at this time. The mill was also visited by Jack Hillier in 1948, while researching his book on Surrey watermills. By this time the mill was a ruin, still containing its machinery. The upper floors of the mill were demolished in 1949 with the lower part of the mill being used as a boat store. in 1962, the Dubars sold the mill to John Edwards. The mill house was condemned in 1964 and stood empty until 1969. The building being then converted and extended to form two residences.

Machinery

Overshot waterwheel, cast iron spokes, wooden soleboard and buckets, 12 feet 6 inches (3.81 m) diameter by 6 feet (1.83 m) wide on an oak axle, driving a 9 feet 6 inches (2.90 m) diameter cast iron pit wheel with oak cogs. This drove a cast iron wallower on a wooden hexagonal upright shaft, driving a wooden Great Spur Wheel 8 feet (2.44 m) in diameter, driving two pairs of millstones.

==== Felcourt (Woodcock Hammer, Weir, Wire) Mill. Felbridge ====
An old hammer mill site, at work from 1567 to 1786. One of the names indicates that the mill was a drawing mill at one time. In 1533, the effects of Thomas Gaynesford included a hammer mill. The property had been bough by Gaynesford from Sir John Gage in 1550. In 1559, Nicholas Norton was a miller grinding grain near lands called Shawnors, followed by John Myller in 1560 to 1563, when John Rodgers succeeded him. in 1567, Wiremill was being worked by John Thorpe. In the 1560s, there are several references to Woodcock Hammer or Forge being worked by Swanne.

Woodcock Forge is believed to have been built by Jack Dancy of Turners Hill. Hedgecourt Mill is thought to have been remodelled by him about the same time. The pond at Hedgecourt acted as a storage for the Woodcock forge. The tilt hammer was operated by an overshot waterwheel. Another overshot waterwheel worked bellows. In 1574, John Thorpe of Hedgecourt was working the forge in connection with the furnace at Myllwood. in 1586 Thorpe bought property from William Swanne Sr in the Woodcock Forge area. From 1598 to 1606 the rent was paid by Thomas Thorpe, son of John and in 1629 the forge was leased by John Gage to Richard Thorpe, the son of Thomas. His son, also Richard, held the forge until 1651, when it was forfeit in lieu of a debt. Thorpe's interest in the forge was sold to Simon Everenden of Cliffe near Lewes. In the 1650s the forge was in the occupation of John Newnham. In 1664, the forge was lease by Jeremy Johnson Jr of Charlwood. In 1672, woodland next to the pond was referred to as "Hammerwood" also known as "Wire Wood" thus indicating a drawing mill. John Newnham died in 1707, and his wife died in 1719, but the forge was known as "Mr Johnson's Forge" in 1717. At that time the output from the forge was some 40 long tons (41 t) per annum. By 1729 the forge was in the occupation of Thomas Stanford, who was converting sows from Heathfield furnace at Woodcock Forge. Stanford does not seem to have had any connections with the Wealden iron industry after 1738. In 1742 Samuel Baker was in occupation, followed by Edward Raby and Alexander Master in 1758. They were supplying the Board of Ordnance with several gauges of bar iron, staff iron and rolled plate. Raby & Master were bankrupt in 1764. Edward Raby died in 1771, and the forge was taken over by his son Alexander until 1774, when the Government forced him to give up Woodcock furnace in a wrangle over the size of his moulds. Joseph Wright and Thomas Pickett took the business, but it is thought that the Hammer Mill ceased to be used c.1787. In 1800, the name Wire Mill is first used.

Daniel Fossick held Wire Mill from 1800 to 1816, when he died. The mill was sold to James Jenner, who converted it to a corn mill. Jenner was at Wire Mill until 1844, when he was succeeded by William Brand. In 1838 he was joined by John Saunders, the mill being known as Woodcock Mill then. Saunders left in 1840 to take Hedgecourt Mill and William Brand joined Jenner. Jenner died in 1844 and Thomas Brand took the mill, which was known as Wire Mill in 1851. At this time the mill had two overshot waterwheels and drove four pairs of millstones. In 1855 the mill lake covered 14 acres (5.7 ha). Thomas Brand was still running the mill in 1871, assisted by his son Thomas, John Holman and John Burfield, all described as millers in the census of that year. In 1881, Thomas Brand (son) was the miller at Wire Mill. He ran the mill until 1887/88 when David Dadswell took the mill. Wire Mill was sold in 1911, described as having two overshot waterwheels and the mill lake covered 11 acres (4.5 ha) at this time. A picture of the mill c.1911 can be seen here. The mill was not sold and again offered for auction in 1912, again without success. A third attempt at auction in 1918 saw the mill being bought by a Major Crum. He sold it to a Miss Wilkins who had the building converted to residential use in 1920. The mill was purchased by the Women's Farm and Garden Union in 1922 and by 1929 was the Wire Mill Tea Gardens. By 1933 it was the Wire Mill Fishing Club and in 1948 the Wire Mill Hotel and Fishing Club. By 1962 the property was known as the Wiremill Lakeside Hotel, Country and Fishing Club. Over the next decade the Country Club grew in popularity, leading to complaints and the local council refused to renew the clubs music and dancing licence. In 1986 the mill was again sold, and although damaged by a fire during renovations reopened as a restaurant in September of that year. The mill was sold again in 1996 and 2000 and is now a pub. The building is devoid of machinery.

=== Lingfield Tannery ===
This tannery was water powered. It stood opposite the present day Lingfield Racecourse. In 1684 the mansion house of Batnors (later Battners) was bought by James Farindon. This included the tanyard, drying sheds and mill thereto. A map of John Gainsford's lands in 1679 shows Gateland Farm was previously known as Tanners Farm. The farm was later the home of Robert Boreman, who died in 1715. The Tannery building was rebuilt by J T Kelsey c.1840. A planning application to demolish the "historic old tannery" was made in 1996 and the site is now a small housing development.

=== Crooked River ===
This rises in springs to the south of the Greensand Ridge at the edge of Limpsfield Common, Surrey. It joins the Kent Brook at (TQ 421 480), just to the west of the hamlet of Troy Town, Kent. On Rocque's map of 1762 it is called the "Serpentine River".

==== Doghurst Mill ====
TQ 412 508 51°14′23″N 0°01′17″E

On the Crooked River at Itchingwood Common, three-quarters of a mile south of the source. On the 1868 county survey the building is standing, but shown as "site of former water mill", and the mill pond is unwatered.

=== Felbridge Water ===
The Felbridge Water is a tributary of the Eden Brook. It powered two watermills.

==== Clarkes Mill, Lingfield ====
TQ 401 402 51°08′38″N 0°00′14″E

This was a hammer mill, owned by Lady Gage in 1574.

==== Ware (Weir) Mill, Felbridge ====
A mill was on this site in 1241, when Stephen the miller held it of William de Adburton at a rent of 11s annually. In 1347, the mill was granted to John Gainsford. In 1406 William Atte Hurst obtained "Crowherstmelle" from the Marchant family, and granted it to William Gainsford. This may refer to this mill (but see above).

=== Other tributaries. ===
There are other tributaries feeding the River Eden that also powered watermills.

==== Four Elms Mill, Hever ====
Possibly the site of the Hever mill mentioned in 1279, when Roland, son of Peter de Broke, attempting to "twirl the wheel" was dragged into the cogs and crushed to death. The mill had an overshot wheel and had been demolished by 1933.

==== Bough Beech Furnaces, Hever ====
TQ 4813 4756 51°12′27″N 0°07′15″E and TQ 4816 4760 51°12′28″N 0°07′17″E.

An old hammer mill site, two furnaces are known to have existed.

==== Christmas Mill, Edenbridge ====
51°10′29″N 0°03′54″E (TQ 444 436) This was a double mill (i.e. having two waterwheels) in 1347, then in the possession of William de Shernden. The mill building survives, converted into a dwelling. The miller in 1841 was J Bassett. In 1910 a float device for automatically regulating the water level in the pond was installed. This is now a static exhibit at the nearby Haxted Mill Museum.

==== Salman's Farm Mill, Penshurst ====
TQ 512 434

A Domesday site, this corn mill was powered supplied by a pond fed by a stream. It was powered by a cast iron overshot waterwheel and the machinery was removed in the early 1930s. The cast iron axle survives.

== See also ==
Medway watermills article
