= Listed buildings in Hever, Kent =

Historic structures in Kent, England

Hever is a village and civil parish in the Sevenoaks District of Kent, England. It contains two grade I and 61 grade II listed buildings that are recorded in the National Heritage List for England.

This list is based on the information retrieved online from Historic England.

== Key ==
Grade	Criteria
I	Buildings that are of exceptional interest
II*	Particularly important buildings of more than special interest
II	Buildings that are of special interest

== Listing ==
Name	Grade	Location	Type	Completed (Note: The date given is the date used by Historic England as significant for the initial building or that of an important part in the structure's description.)	Date designated	Grid ref. (Note: The grid reference is based on the British national grid reference system, sometimes known as OSGB36, used by the Ordnance Survey.) Geo-coordinates	Notes	Entry number (Note: The "List Entry Number" is a unique number assigned to each listed building and scheduled monument by Historic England.)	Image	Wikidata
Church of St Peter	I				16 January 1975	TQ4765544849; 51°11′02″N 0°06′41″E		1258341	Church of St Peter More images	Q17529887
Hever War Memorial	II				5 November 2019	TQ4761844860; 51°11′02″N 0°06′39″E		1465085	Hever War Memorial More images	Q94729345
Polebrook Oast	II				14 May 1990	TQ4755245428; 51°11′21″N 0°06′36″E		1272447	Upload Photo	Q26562281
Furnace House	II	Bough Beech Road, Furnace House			16 January 1975	TQ4811547840; 51°12′38″N 0°07′09″E		1273466	Upload Photo	Q26563210
The Old Farm	II	Cow Lane, Markbeech			16 January 1975	TQ4757842662; 51°09′51″N 0°06′33″E		1261526	Upload Photo	Q26552467
Chittenden House	II	Four Elms			23 September 1987	TQ4812249306; 51°13′25″N 0°07′11″E		1244194	Upload Photo	Q26536826
Church of St Paul	II	Four Elms			10 September 1954	TQ4701048233; 51°12′52″N 0°06′12″E		1246074	Church of St Paul More images	Q26538518
Congregational Church	II	Four Elms			19 June 1998	TQ4675648446; 51°12′59″N 0°06′00″E		1119773	Congregational Church More images	Q26413065
Former Oasthouse and Stabling of Chittenden House	II	Four Elms			23 September 1987	TQ4812449258; 51°13′24″N 0°07′11″E		1244197	Upload Photo	Q26536829
Owls Court	II	Four Elms			16 January 1975	TQ4721647624; 51°12′32″N 0°06′22″E		1258354	Upload Photo	Q26549600
The Four Elms Public House	II	Four Elms			16 January 1975	TQ4684748273; 51°12′53″N 0°06′04″E		1258518	The Four Elms Public House More images	Q26549742
The Mill Cottage	II	Four Elms			16 January 1975	TQ4684648610; 51°13′04″N 0°06′04″E		1258513	Upload Photo	Q26549738
Bellmans Green	II	Four Elms Road, Edenbridge			16 January 1975	TQ4599247283; 51°12′22″N 0°05′19″E		1261513	Upload Photo	Q26552457
Broxham House	II	Four Elms Road, Edenbridge			16 January 1975	TQ4590847657; 51°12′34″N 0°05′15″E		1085935	Upload Photo	Q26374986
Broxham Manor	II	Four Elms Road, Edenbridge, Broxham Manor			10 September 1954	TQ4565448357; 51°12′57″N 0°05′03″E		1253990	Broxham Manor More images	Q26545692
Little Broxham	II	Four Elms Road, Edenbridge, Little Broxham			15 November 1973	TQ4567647722; 51°12′36″N 0°05′03″E		1085933	Upload Photo	Q26374976
Medhurst Row Farmhouse	II	Four Elms Road, Edenbridge			16 January 1975	TQ4637347079; 51°12′15″N 0°05′38″E		1085934	Upload Photo	Q26374982
Poland's Cottage Poland's Hope	II	3, Four Elms Road, Edenbridge			16 January 1975	TQ4633047964; 51°12′44″N 0°05′37″E		1253991	Upload Photo	Q26545693
Polands Barn and Oast	II	Four Elms Road, Edenbridge			27 April 1988	TQ4625147935; 51°12′43″N 0°05′33″E		1244217	Upload Photo	Q26536849
Little Chittenden	II	Green Lane			16 January 1975	TQ4789049265; 51°13′24″N 0°06′59″E		1258342	Upload Photo	Q26549588
Hever Castle	I	Hever Castle			10 September 1954	TQ4783045188; 51°11′13″N 0°06′50″E		1273465	Hever Castle More images	Q1132683
Italian Sculpture Garden to South East of Hever Castle	II	Hever Castle			16 January 1975	TQ4815945233; 51°11′14″N 0°07′07″E		1258340	Italian Sculpture Garden to South East of Hever Castle More images	Q26549587
Barn Immediately South East of the Bower	II	Hever Road			1 November 1988	TQ4712444855; 51°11′02″N 0°06′13″E		1244248	Upload Photo	Q26536877
Brocas Manor	II	Hever Road			16 January 1975	TQ4695045090; 51°11′10″N 0°06′05″E		1273467	Upload Photo	Q26563211
Church Cottage Ghyll Cottage	II	Hever Road			16 January 1975	TQ4763544808; 51°11′00″N 0°06′40″E		1258343	Upload Photo	Q26549589
Garden Walls to East of Polebrook House Including Boundary Wall	II	Hever Road			16 January 1975	TQ4760145468; 51°11′22″N 0°06′39″E		1258450	Upload Photo	Q26549683
Polebrook House	II	Hever Road			16 January 1975	TQ4756645465; 51°11′22″N 0°06′37″E		1258345	Upload Photo	Q26549591
The Bower	II	Hever Road			1 November 1988	TQ4709444880; 51°11′03″N 0°06′12″E		1272470	Upload Photo	Q26562303
The Thatched Cottage	II	Hever Road			16 January 1975	TQ4743744828; 51°11′01″N 0°06′29″E		1258344	Upload Photo	Q26549590
Barn to the North of the Old Farmhouse	II	Hever Station			16 January 1975	TQ4671144689; 51°10′57″N 0°05′52″E		1258455	Upload Photo	Q26549687
Chippens Bank	II	Hever Station			16 January 1975	TQ4698844571; 51°10′53″N 0°06′06″E		1258463	Upload Photo	Q26549695
Chippens Bank Cottages	II	1-3, Hever Station			16 January 1975	TQ4683844438; 51°10′49″N 0°05′58″E		1273421	Upload Photo	Q26563166
Drive Cottage Chippens Bank	II	Hever Station			16 January 1975	TQ4698444551; 51°10′53″N 0°06′06″E		1258347	Upload Photo	Q26549593
Shed to the North West of the Old Farmhouse	II	Hever Station			16 January 1975	TQ4668344680; 51°10′57″N 0°05′50″E		1273470	Upload Photo	Q26563214
The Oast Newhouse Farm	II	Hever Station, Newhouse Farm			16 January 1975	TQ4675544659; 51°10′56″N 0°05′54″E		1258346	Upload Photo	Q26549592
The Old Farmhouse	II	Hever Station, Newhouse Farm			16 January 1975	TQ4672144661; 51°10′56″N 0°05′52″E		1273469	Upload Photo	Q26563213
Little Warren Road	II	Hever Station Road			16 January 1975	TQ4649143922; 51°10′33″N 0°05′39″E		1258348	Upload Photo	Q26549594
Epsom Wing, Hever Stud Farm	II	Hever Stud Farm, How Green			15 November 1990	TQ4774646327; 51°11′49″N 0°06′47″E		1244272	Upload Photo	Q26536901
Full of Hope Wing, Hever Stud Farm	II	Hever Stud Farm, How Green			15 November 1990	TQ4773746355; 51°11′50″N 0°06′47″E		1272450	Upload Photo	Q26562284
Circular Colonnade at Hever Lodge and Cowhouses	II	How Green			15 November 1990	TQ4773846297; 51°11′48″N 0°06′47″E		1244268	Upload Photo	Q26536897
Dairy Cottage at Hever Stud Farm	II	How Green			15 November 1990	TQ4772546277; 51°11′48″N 0°06′46″E		1244271	Upload Photo	Q26536900
Dairy at Hever Lodge	II	How Green			15 November 1990	TQ4772346285; 51°11′48″N 0°06′46″E		1244270	Upload Photo	Q26536899
Former Haybarn at Hever Lodge	II	How Green			15 November 1990	TQ4771746326; 51°11′49″N 0°06′46″E		1244269	Upload Photo	Q26536898
Garages Formerly Cartsheds at Hever Stud Farm	II	How Green			15 November 1990	TQ4774446344; 51°11′50″N 0°06′47″E		1244274	Upload Photo	Q26536903
Hever Castle Stud Farm	II	How Green			15 November 1990	TQ4775346311; 51°11′49″N 0°06′48″E		1244273	Upload Photo	Q26536902
Hever Lodge	II	How Green			15 November 1990	TQ4769146303; 51°11′49″N 0°06′45″E		1244266	Upload Photo	Q26536895
Stables to Hever Lodge	II	How Green			15 November 1990	TQ4770546322; 51°11′49″N 0°06′45″E		1244267	Upload Photo	Q26536896
Moorcocks	II	How Green Road			16 January 1975	TQ4696346754; 51°12′04″N 0°06′08″E		1258349	Upload Photo	Q26549595
Whistler's Farmhouse	II	How Green Road, Whistlers			16 January 1975	TQ4674546541; 51°11′57″N 0°05′56″E		1258472	Upload Photo	Q26549702
Granary to North of Oak Farm House	II	Mapleton Road, Mapleton			16 January 1975	TQ4609549523; 51°13′34″N 0°05′27″E		1272625	Upload Photo	Q26562450
Oak Farmhouse	II	Mapleton Road, Mapleton			10 September 1954	TQ4611649500; 51°13′34″N 0°05′28″E		1244003	Upload Photo	Q26536651
Bramsell Farmhouse	II	Mark Beech, Bramsell Farm			16 January 1975	TQ4718342771; 51°09′55″N 0°06′13″E		1258522	Upload Photo	Q26549746
Church of the Holy Trinity	II	Markbeech			10 September 1954	TQ4747742769; 51°09′55″N 0°06′28″E		1336401	Church of the Holy Trinity More images	Q26620892
Pigdown Farm Cottages	II	1 and 2, Pigdown Lane			16 January 1975	TQ4792844011; 51°10′34″N 0°06′53″E		1258350	Upload Photo	Q26549596
Barn at Lockhurst Farm	II	Prettymans Lane, Edenbridge			7 July 1989	TQ4606847267; 51°12′21″N 0°05′22″E		1272474	Upload Photo	Q26562307
Terry's Farmhouse	II	Rectory Lane			16 January 1975	TQ4731644400; 51°10′47″N 0°06′22″E		1258499	Upload Photo	Q26549727
Brook Cottage	II	Uckfield Lane			16 January 1975	TQ4724044748; 51°10′59″N 0°06′19″E		1273406	Upload Photo	Q26563153
Hever Grange	II	Uckfield Lane, Hever Grange			16 January 1975	TQ4723844601; 51°10′54″N 0°06′19″E		1258353	Upload Photo	Q26549599
Hope Cottage	II	Uckfield Lane			16 January 1975	TQ4734044627; 51°10′55″N 0°06′24″E		1258351	Upload Photo	Q26549597
The Old Rectory	II	Uckfield Lane			10 September 1954	TQ4738044453; 51°10′49″N 0°06′26″E		1258352	Upload Photo	Q26549598
Water House	II	Uckfield Lane			21 November 1990	TQ4697344824; 51°11′02″N 0°06′05″E		1244275	Upload Photo	Q26536904
Wilderness Farm Barn	II	Wilderness Farm			17 February 1988	TQ4798443255; 51°10′10″N 0°06′55″E		1244201	Upload Photo	Q26536833
Wilderness Farmhouse	II	Wilderness Farm			17 February 1988	TQ4802143263; 51°10′10″N 0°06′57″E		1272494	Upload Photo	Q26562327

== See also ==
- Grade I listed buildings in Kent
- Grade II* listed buildings in Kent

== Sources ==
- Newman, John (2012) [1969], Kent: West and the Weald, The Buildings of England, New Haven and London: Yale University Press, ISBN 978-0-300-18509-6
