= Four Elms =

Village in Kent, England

Coordinates: 51°13′N 0°6′E

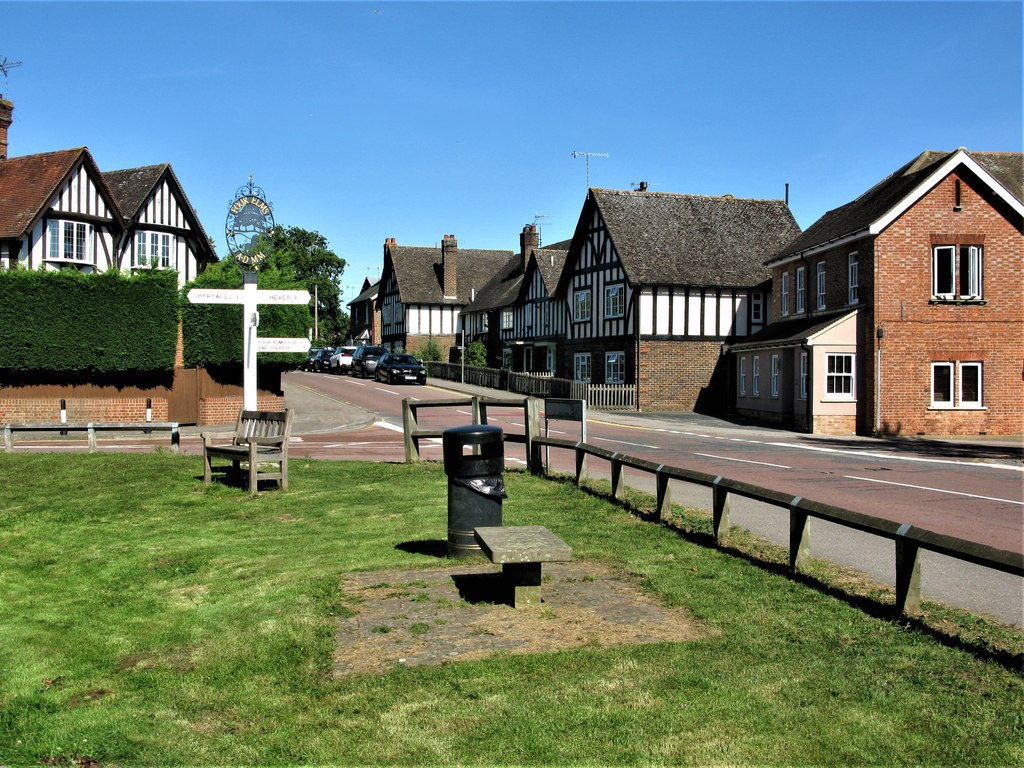
- Ide Hill Road

- Flag

- Location within Kent
- Civil parish: Hever
- District: Sevenoaks
- Shire county: Kent
- Region: South East
- Country: England
- Sovereign state: United Kingdom
- Post town: EDENBRIDGE
- Postcode district: TN8
- Police: Kent
- Fire: Kent
- Ambulance: South East Coast
- UK Parliament: Tonbridge

Four Elms is a village within the civil parish of Hever in the Sevenoaks District of Kent, England. The village is located on a crossroads between Edenbridge and Sevenoaks, two miles (3.2 km) northeast of the former place.

The church was built in 1881. It is a part of a united benefice with Hever and Markbeech, and is dedicated to St Paul.

The film sound recordist Peter Handford was born in the vicarage here.
