= Listed buildings in Edenbridge, Kent =

Historic structures in Kent, England

Edenbridge is a village and civil parish in the Sevenoaks District of Kent, England. It contains one grade I, five grade II* and 78 grade II listed buildings that are recorded in the National Heritage List for England.

This list is based on the information retrieved online from Historic England.

== Key ==
Grade	Criteria
I	Buildings that are of exceptional interest
II*	Particularly important buildings of more than special interest
II	Buildings that are of special interest

== Listing ==
Name	Grade	Location	Type	Completed (Note: The date given is the date used by Historic England as significant for the initial building or that of an important part in the structure's description.)	Date designated	Grid ref. (Note: The grid reference is based on the British national grid reference system, sometimes known as OSGB36, used by the Ordnance Survey.) Geo-coordinates	Notes	Entry number (Note: The "List Entry Number" is a unique number assigned to each listed building and scheduled monument by Historic England.)	Image	Wikidata
Former the White Horse Inn	II	64 High Street, TN8 5AJ			10 September 1954	TQ4436646188; 51°11′48″N 0°03′53″E		1259789	Former the White Horse Inn More images	Q26550880
The Old Eden	II	121 High Street, TN8 5AX			16 January 1975	TQ4445845891; 51°11′38″N 0°03′58″E		1336407	The Old Eden More images	Q26620899
7 and 9, Church Street	II	7 and 9, Church Street			10 September 1954	TQ4443646100; 51°11′45″N 0°03′57″E		1336403	Upload Photo	Q26620895
Church Cottage	II	Church Street			16 January 1975	TQ4444746165; 51°11′47″N 0°03′57″E		1253987	Upload Photo	Q26545690
Church of St Peter and St Paul	I	Church Street			10 September 1954	TQ4449046130; 51°11′46″N 0°04′00″E		1085930	Church of St Peter and St Paul More images	Q17529842
Former Edenbridge Library	II	Church Street, TN8 5BD			16 January 1975	TQ4444446115; 51°11′46″N 0°03′57″E		1253984	Upload Photo	Q26545687
Crouch House	II	Crouch House Road			16 January 1975	TQ4328346689; 51°12′05″N 0°02′58″E		1085932	Upload Photo	Q26374971
The Lodge	II	Crouch House Road			16 January 1975	TQ4352446738; 51°12′07″N 0°03′11″E		1085931	Upload Photo	Q26374964
Skinners Farmhouse	II	Four Elms Road			16 January 1975	TQ4525546618; 51°12′01″N 0°04′40″E		1254002	Upload Photo	Q26545703
3, 4 and 5, Greybury Lane	II	3, 4 and 5, Greybury Lane			13 January 1999	TQ4363343821; 51°10′32″N 0°03′12″E		1245055	Upload Photo	Q26537628
Barn at Greybury Farm to North West of Farmhouse	II	Greybury Lane, Marsh Green			24 August 1987	TQ4374342771; 51°09′58″N 0°03′16″E		1272510	Upload Photo	Q26562343
Cartshed at Greybury Farm to South East of Farmhouse	II	Greybury Lane, Marsh Green			24 August 1987	TQ4377242712; 51°09′56″N 0°03′18″E		1272492	Upload Photo	Q26562325
Greybury Farmhouse	II	Greybury Lane, Greybury Farm			16 January 1975	TQ4377042742; 51°09′57″N 0°03′18″E		1085956	Upload Photo	Q26375091
Smoaky Cottage	II	Greybury Lane, Smoaky Cottage, Marsh Green			16 January 1975	TQ4365843588; 51°10′25″N 0°03′13″E		1258192	Upload Photo	Q26549463
Brook Street Farmhouse	II	Hartfield Road, Brook Street Farm			16 January 1975	TQ4575643949; 51°10′34″N 0°05′02″E		1362403	Upload Photo	Q26644295
Brookside	II	Hartfield Road, Stanford's End			16 January 1975	TQ4514844532; 51°10′54″N 0°04′31″E		1258235	Upload Photo	Q26549492
Granary Attached to Barn	II	Hartfield Road			15 February 1988	TQ4510744532; 51°10′54″N 0°04′29″E		1272495	Upload Photo	Q26562328
Large Barn to East of Stanford's End	II	Hartfield Road, Stanford's End			16 January 1975	TQ4510844492; 51°10′53″N 0°04′29″E		1071954	Upload Photo	Q26327330
North Barn at Old Barn Farm	II	Hartfield Road			15 February 1988	TQ4508744565; 51°10′55″N 0°04′28″E		1244203	Upload Photo	Q26536835
Old Stanford's End	II*	Hartfield Road, Stanford's End			10 September 1954	TQ4508444460; 51°10′51″N 0°04′28″E		1258231	Upload Photo	Q17545723
Retaining and Garden Wall to South and West of Brook Street Farmhouse	II	Hartfield Road, Stanford's End			16 January 1975	TQ4574043945; 51°10′34″N 0°05′01″E		1258236	Upload Photo	Q26549493
South Barn at Old Barn Farm	II	Hartfield Road			15 February 1988	TQ4509944543; 51°10′54″N 0°04′29″E		1244202	Upload Photo	Q26536834
Stanford's End Farm	II	Hartfield Road, Stanford's End			10 September 1954	TQ4507244494; 51°10′53″N 0°04′27″E		1362402	Upload Photo	Q26644294
Stanford's End Oast	II	Hartfield Road, Stanford's End			16 January 1975	TQ4510744469; 51°10′52″N 0°04′29″E		1071953	Upload Photo	Q26327328
2 and 4, Hever Road	II	2 and 4, Hever Road			16 January 1975	TQ4448945786; 51°11′35″N 0°03′59″E		1085936	Upload Photo	Q26374992
Delaware	II	Hever Road			10 September 1954	TQ4599645815; 51°11′34″N 0°05′17″E		1261515	Upload Photo	Q26552458
Granary to South West of Delaware	II	Hever Road			16 January 1975	TQ4598045790; 51°11′34″N 0°05′16″E		1085938	Upload Photo	Q26375001
Mounting Block at Side Entrance of Delaware	II	Hever Road			16 January 1975	TQ4599445802; 51°11′34″N 0°05′16″E		1085957	Upload Photo	Q26375096
Outbuilding to North East of Delaware	II	Hever Road			10 September 1954	TQ4600845832; 51°11′35″N 0°05′17″E		1336404	Upload Photo	Q26620896
129-133, High Street	II	129-133, High Street			16 January 1975	TQ4447245848; 51°11′37″N 0°03′58″E		1085943	Upload Photo	Q26375022
44, High Street	II	44, High Street			16 January 1975	TQ4435246256; 51°11′50″N 0°03′53″E		1242978	Upload Photo	Q26535695
46 and 48, High Street	II	46 and 48, High Street			16 January 1975	TQ4435446249; 51°11′50″N 0°03′53″E		1085946	Upload Photo	Q26375038
59, High Street	II	59, High Street			16 January 1975	TQ4439546165; 51°11′47″N 0°03′55″E		1085939	Upload Photo	Q26375005
60 and 62, High Street	II	60 and 62, High Street			10 September 1954	TQ4436246204; 51°11′49″N 0°03′53″E		1336410	Upload Photo	Q26620902
61-65, High Street	II	61-65, High Street			16 January 1975	TQ4439846149; 51°11′47″N 0°03′55″E		1336405	Upload Photo	Q26620897
66 and 66a, High Street	II	66 and 66a, High Street			10 September 1954	TQ4436946176; 51°11′48″N 0°03′53″E		1085947	Upload Photo	Q26375043
77 and 79, High Street	II	77 and 79, High Street			16 January 1975	TQ4442146079; 51°11′44″N 0°03′56″E		1336406	Upload Photo	Q26620898
86-90, High Street	II	86-90, High Street			16 January 1975	TQ4439846065; 51°11′44″N 0°03′55″E		1336372	Upload Photo	Q26620865
94 and 96, High Street	II	94 and 96, High Street			10 September 1954	TQ4440246029; 51°11′43″N 0°03′55″E		1085949	94 and 96, High Street More images	Q26375054
Barn in Back Yard to West of Church House	II	High Street			10 September 1954	TQ4435846126; 51°11′46″N 0°03′53″E		1085948	Upload Photo	Q26375049
Bridge Over the River Eden	II	High Street			10 September 1954	TQ4443245960; 51°11′41″N 0°03′56″E		1336373	Upload Photo	Q26620866
Church House	II*	72, High Street			10 September 1954	TQ4438046138; 51°11′46″N 0°03′54″E		1242994	Upload Photo	Q17545540
Eden Cottage	II	High Street			27 July 1973	TQ4447045753; 51°11′34″N 0°03′58″E		1259750	Upload Photo	Q26550843
Eden House	II	High Street			10 September 1954	TQ4451145692; 51°11′32″N 0°04′00″E		1336408	Upload Photo	Q26620900
Forecourt Walls and Piers to Eden House	II	High Street			16 January 1975	TQ4450045689; 51°11′32″N 0°03′59″E		1259820	Upload Photo	Q26550905
Mill House the Old Mill	II	85, High Street			10 September 1954	TQ4442746040; 51°11′43″N 0°03′56″E		1085942	Upload Photo	Q26375016
Painter's Cottage	II	20, High Street			16 January 1975	TQ4431846380; 51°11′54″N 0°03′51″E		1242975	Upload Photo	Q26535693
Presbytery of Roman Catholic Church of St Lawrence	II	High Street			16 January 1975	TQ4432446356; 51°11′54″N 0°03′51″E		1336409	Upload Photo	Q26620901
Riverside Cottage	II	High Street			16 January 1975	TQ4447445922; 51°11′39″N 0°03′58″E		1261502	Upload Photo	Q26552447
Stump of the Old Windmill	II	High Street			10 September 1954	TQ4450645453; 51°11′24″N 0°03′59″E		1258115	Stump of the Old Windmill More images	Q5336976
Tanyard House	II*	92, High Street			10 September 1954	TQ4439446048; 51°11′43″N 0°03′54″E		1258054	Tanyard House More images	Q17545716
Taylour House	II*	69, High Street			10 September 1954	TQ4440346112; 51°11′46″N 0°03′55″E		1085940	Upload Photo	Q17545452
The Cottage	II	18, High Street			16 January 1975	TQ4431646387; 51°11′55″N 0°03′51″E		1085945	Upload Photo	Q26375033
The Crown Hotel	II*	High Street			10 September 1954	TQ4438646117; 51°11′46″N 0°03′54″E		1259794	The Crown Hotel More images	Q17545789
The Ebenezer Chapel	II	High Street			5 September 1991	TQ4434446272; 51°11′51″N 0°03′52″E		1244278	The Ebenezer Chapel More images	Q26536907
The King and Queen Public House	II	81, High Street			16 January 1975	TQ4441946067; 51°11′44″N 0°03′56″E		1085941	The King and Queen Public House More images	Q26375010
The Old Vicarage	II	128 and 128a, High Street			16 January 1975	TQ4445545827; 51°11′36″N 0°03′57″E		1258089	Upload Photo	Q26549372
Wicken Cottage	II	High Street			16 January 1975	TQ4448845777; 51°11′35″N 0°03′59″E		1242906	Upload Photo	Q26535627
Windmill House	II	High Street			16 January 1975	TQ4452845472; 51°11′25″N 0°04′01″E		1085951	Upload Photo	Q26375066
Barn to West of Hilders Farmhouse	II	Hilders Lane, Hilders Farm			16 January 1975	TQ4308647795; 51°12′41″N 0°02′50″E		1258121	Upload Photo	Q26549401
Hilders Farmhouse	II	Hilders Lane, Hilders Farm			16 January 1975	TQ4314947799; 51°12′41″N 0°02′53″E		1336374	Upload Photo	Q26620867
Gaywood	II	Hole Lane, Gaywood			16 January 1975	TQ4307848953; 51°13′19″N 0°02′51″E		1085952	Upload Photo	Q26375070
Old Pound House	II	Lingfield Road			16 January 1975	TQ4415046087; 51°11′45″N 0°03′42″E		1273556	Upload Photo	Q26563287
Outbuildings to North West of Skeynes Park	II	Lingfield Road, Skeynes			16 January 1975	TQ4330546125; 51°11′47″N 0°02′59″E		1259737	Upload Photo	Q26550831
Skeynes Park	II	Lingfield Road, Skeynes			16 January 1975	TQ4332746110; 51°11′46″N 0°03′00″E		1085953	Upload Photo	Q26375076
Stable Court to North of Skeynes Park	II	Lingfield Road, Skeynes			16 January 1975	TQ4328346194; 51°11′49″N 0°02′57″E		1085954	Upload Photo	Q26375081
Barn at Lydens Farm	II	Lydens Lane, Lydens Farm			6 December 1991	TQ4585244646; 51°10′57″N 0°05′07″E		1272454	Upload Photo	Q26562287
Lydens Farmhouse	II	Lydens Lane, Stanford's End			16 January 1975	TQ4582844619; 51°10′56″N 0°05′06″E		1071955	Upload Photo	Q26327331
Brownings	II	Main Road, Marlpit Hill			24 February 1973	TQ4404547838; 51°12′42″N 0°03′39″E		1258216	Upload Photo	Q26549478
Eagle Lodge Firs Lodge Including Stables at Rear	II	Main Road, Marlpit Hill			6 September 1989	TQ4398447797; 51°12′40″N 0°03′36″E		1244249	Upload Photo	Q26536878
Edenbridge House	II	Main Road, Marlpit Hill			16 January 1975	TQ4370548423; 51°13′01″N 0°03′22″E		1258204	Upload Photo	Q26549472
Little Earlylands	II	Main Road, Little Earlylands, Marlpit Hill			16 January 1975	TQ4371048943; 51°13′18″N 0°03′23″E		1258202	Upload Photo	Q26549471
The Albion Hotel	II	Main Road, Marlpit Hill			16 January 1975	TQ4402547617; 51°12′35″N 0°03′38″E		1071952	Upload Photo	Q26327327
Gabriels Manor	II	Marsh Green Road, Marsh Green, Gabriels Manor			10 September 1954	TQ4435244859; 51°11′05″N 0°03′51″E		1273530	Upload Photo	Q26563266
Ashcroft Oak Villa	II	Mill Hill			16 January 1975	TQ4452845602; 51°11′29″N 0°04′01″E		1085944	Upload Photo	Q26375027
Millions	II	Mill Hill, TN8 5BU			16 January 1975	TQ4446745774; 51°11′35″N 0°03′58″E		1085950	Upload Photo	Q26375059
Stanholm	II	Mill Hill			16 January 1975	TQ4455045564; 51°11′28″N 0°04′02″E		1242970	Upload Photo	Q26535688
Hillands	II	Shernden Lane			16 January 1975	TQ4473443878; 51°10′33″N 0°04′09″E		1253981	Upload Photo	Q26545684
Oast Cottage to West of Ockhams Old House	II	Shernden Lane, Ockhams			16 January 1975	TQ4451343317; 51°10′15″N 0°03′57″E		1085928	Upload Photo	Q26374954
Ockhams Old House	II	Shernden Lane, Ockhams			16 January 1975	TQ4453243299; 51°10′14″N 0°03′58″E		1336402	Upload Photo	Q26620894
Shernden	II	Shernden Lane			16 January 1975	TQ4484143520; 51°10′21″N 0°04′14″E		1085929	Upload Photo	Q26374960
Former Goods Shed at Edenbridge Town Station	II	Station Approach, TN8 5LP			22 March 2013	TQ4459046483; 51°11′57″N 0°04′05″E		1410762	Upload Photo	Q26676173
Swan Lane Barn at Swan Lane Farm	II	Swan Lane			22 April 1994	TQ4451848081; 51°12′49″N 0°04′04″E		1272456	Upload Photo	Q26562289
Yew Tree Farmhouse	II	Troy Lane, Yew Tree Farm			16 January 1975	TQ4270047956; 51°12′47″N 0°02′30″E		1085955	Upload Photo	Q26375085

== See also ==
- Grade I listed buildings in Kent
- Grade II* listed buildings in Kent

== Sources ==
- Newman, John (2012) [1969], Kent: West and the Weald, The Buildings of England, New Haven and London: Yale University Press, ISBN 978-0-300-18509-6
