= Pamela Harrison (composer) =

English composer, pianist and music teacher

- Born: 28 November 1915; Orpington, England
- Died: 28 August 1990 (aged 74); Firle, East Sussex, England
- Education: Royal College of Music
- Occupations: Composer, pianist, music teacher
- Years active: 1930s–1980s
- Notable work: Quintet for flute, oboe and strings; Cello Sonata; Viola Sonata; Clarinet Sonata; Concertante for piano and strings; The Dark Forest (song cycle)
- Spouse: Harvey Phillips (m. 1943; div. 1959)
- Children: Tim Phillips

Pamela Harrison (28 November 1915 – 28 August 1990) was an English composer, pianist and music teacher. Harrison's music was influenced by composers including E.J. Moeran, Arnold Bax and John Ireland, and French music.

== Early career ==
Pamela Harrison was born in Orpington, England, and educated at the Brampton Down School for Girls in Folkestone. She studied with Gordon Jacob and Arthur Benjamin at the Royal College of Music in London. She first made her mark as a composer with the Quintet for flute, oboe and strings, written in 1938 and first performed that year at a concert of the Society for the Promotion of New Music. The Quintet was heard again in 1944 at Fyvie Hall, Regent Street, played by an ensemble led by Leonard Hirsch.

== Wartime ==
During World War II, she worked as a school teacher. She was music mistress at The Hall School, Wincanton, Somerset in 1942, and at St Monica's School, Clacton-on-Sea from 1943 until 1945. She also continued to compose and perform. Her String Quartet was played more than once at the wartime Myra Hess National Gallery concerts in 1944.

She married the cellist and conductor Harvey Phillips (1910 – active until late 1970s) in 1943. They lived initially at The Red House, Crockham Hill, Kent, and then at "The Cearne", (previously the house of Edward and Constance Garnett). Harvey was a member of the Hirsch String Quartet and made his professional conducting debut with the Jacques Orchestra at the Wigmore Hall in 1950 (at which he conducted his wife's Suite for Tomothy). That year he formed the Harvey Phillips String Orchestra (with leader Hugh Bean), which included in its repertoire Harrison's Five Poems of Ernest Dowson for tenor and string orchestra - the first London performance with Peter Pears as the soloist on 15 December 1952 at the Royal Festival Hall - and her Six Poems of Baudelaire. Pamela Harrison wrote her 1944 Cello Sonata for Harvey, who gave its debut performance with pianist John Wills at the Wigmore Hall on 9 May 1947. The marriage ended in 1959, and Harrison moved to Brimstone Down, a remote Dartmoor farmhouse.

== Post war ==
After the war Harrison went on to compose chamber and orchestral music, as well as vocal settings of Baudelaire, Herrick, Dowson and Edward Thomas. The Viola Sonata was written in 1946 and performed a year later at the Wigmore Hall. Watson Forbes and Alan Richardson gave its first broadcast performance on 17 March 1951. Her piece for small orchestra, A Suite for Timothy, was composed for the first birthday of her son in 1948 and first performed at Hampton Court in 1949. It has been recorded, and was revived in a live performance by the Somerset County Orchestra in December 2023.

The Clarinet Sonata (1954) was written for Jack Brymer, who was also the soloist in several performances and broadcasts of the Clarinet Quintet in the late 1950s. In May 1959, Harrison's Concertante for piano and string orchestra with Eric Harrison (not related) as soloist was broadcast on BBC Radio. An archive recording exists, and the first modern performance took place on 13 December 2023. The Edward Thomas song cycle The Dark Forest for tenor and strings was composed in 1957, but had to wait until 1979 for its first broadcast performance, by Ian Partridge. A modern studio performance in Salford by the BBC Philharmonic with tenor John Finden took place on 10 January 2024. The same orchestra revived Harrison's Five Poems of Ernest Dowson on 17 April 2024 under conductor Martyn Brabbins.

== Final years ==
She also studied Dalcroze eurhythmics, giving exhibitions with Emile Jaques-Dalcroze in Brighton. By the late 1960s Harrison was living at The Old Toll House, Yarlington in Somerset. In 1983 she moved again, to a seafront flat in Brighton. She died aged 74 in a car accident in Firle, East Sussex. Jack Brymer performed the short piece Drifting Away at her Service of Thanksgiving in December 1990. Her son Tim Phillips, who was Artistic Director of East Devon Music, died in 2023.

== Selected works ==
Orchestral

- A Suite for Timothy for string orchestra (1948)
- Concertante for piano and string orchestra (1954)
- An Evocation of the Weald, symphonic poem (1954)
- Brimstone Down for small orchestra (1958)

Chamber music

- Allegretto for cello and piano (c.1935); published in The Strad, February 2003
- Quintet for flute, oboe, violin, viola and cello (1938)
- String Quartet (1944)
- String Trio (1945)
- Sonata for viola and piano (1946)
- Woodwind Quintet (1948)
- Sonata for cello and piano (1947)
- Sonatina for violin and piano (fp. Wigmore Hall, 15 October 1949)
- Sonata for clarinet and piano (1954)
- Clarinet Quintet for clarinet, 2 violins, viola and cello (1956)
- Idle Dan, or, Nothing to Do for cello and piano (1959)
- 2 Pieces for cello and piano (1959)
  - 'White May Morning'
  - 'A Marsh Song'
- Four Pieces (1962)
  - Lento espressivo, for flute and piano
  - Allegretto e leggiero (also published separately as Chase a Shadow) for oboe and piano
  - Andante, for clarinet and piano
  - Moderato, for bassoon and piano
- Badinage for flute and piano (pub. Chappell, 1963)
- Chase a Shadow for oboe and piano (1963)
- Faggot Dance for bassoon and piano (1963)
- Sonnet in D minor for cello and piano (1963)
- Lament for viola and piano (1965)
- Piano Trio for violin, cello and piano (1967)
- Quartet for flute, violin, cello and piano (1968)
- Quintet for flute, oboe, violin, cello and piano (1974)
- Drifting Away for clarinet and piano (1975)
- 5 Pieces for flute and piano (1976)
- Septet for clarinet, horn, bassoon, violin, viola, cello and double bass (1980)
- Octetto Pastorale for wind octet (2 oboes, 2 clarinets, 2 horns, 2 bassoons) (1981)
- Mariner's Way for flute and piano (1982)
- Lullaby for cello and piano
- Rock Grove Suite for flute, cello and piano (1989)
- Trio for oboe, bassoon and piano

Organ

- Epithalamium (1967)

Piano

- Anderida, 6 Diversions (1960, pub. Chappell, 1963)

1. Romney Marsh Goblin
2. A Canterbury Tale
3. Hoppers' Dance
4. Childdingstone Cherry Pickers
5. Ebb tide at Sandgate
6. Faversham Fair

- 6 Eclogues of Portugal (1960)

1. Plains and Hills
2. Little Boy Following
3. An Ancient Olive Grove
4. Horsemen to the Fair
5. Shepherd's Siesta
6. Estremoz, Walled City

- Dance Little Lady, suite for piano duet (1976)

Vocal

- The Lonely Landscape for voice and piano (1944); words by Emily Brontë

1. Fall, leaves, fall; die, flowers, away
2. I'm happiest now when most away
3. The night is darkening round me
4. The battle has passed from the height
5. The starry night shall tidings bring
6. 'Tis moonlight, summer moonlight

- 6 Poems of Baudelaire for tenor and string orchestra (1944–1945); words by Charles Baudelaire
- 8 Poems of Walter de la Mare for voice and piano (1949); words by Walter de la Mare

1. Blindman's In
2. A Goldfinch
3. White
4. Dreamland
5. Where
6. Why?
7. The Horseman
8. Nicoletta

- 5 Poems of Ernest Dowson for tenor and string orchestra (1951–1952); words by Ernest Dowson

1. Beata solitudo
2. Non suma qualis eram bonae sub regno Cynarae
3. Vitae summa brevis spem nos vetat incohare longam
4. Villanelle of Marguerite's
5. Soli cantare periti Arcades

- The Kindling of the Day for voice and string quartet (1952)

1. To Julia, in her Dawn, or Daybreak
2. Upon Julia’s Haire, Filled With Dew
3. The Tear Sent to Her from Staines
4. To the Western Wind
5. A Meditation for His Mistress
6. To Musick: A Song
7. To the Water Nymphs Drinking at the Fountain
8. Gilly-flowers
9. To Daisies: Not to Shut So Soon
10. The Night-Piece: To Julia

- 2 Songs for voice and piano (1954); words by Walter de la Mare
- The Dark Forest, song cycle for tenor and string orchestra (1957); words by Edward Thomas
- 8 Songs for voice, recorder and piano (1959); words by Walter de la Mare

1. Blindman’s In
2. A Goldfinch
3. White
4. Dreamland
5. Where
6. Why?
7. The Horseman
8. Nicoletta

- Ladies' Choice for voice, violin, cello and harp (1969); words by Walter de la Mare

Choral

- Songs for children's chorus and piano (1969); words by Walter de la Mare

== Recordings ==
Selected recordings include:

- A Portrait of the Viola – Sonata for viola and piano: Helen Callus (viola), Robert McDonald (piano). ASV CD DCA 1130 (2002)
- English String Miniatures, Volume 5 – A Suite for Timothy: Gavin Sutherland (conductor), Royal Ballet Sinfonia. Naxos 8.557752 (2006)
- La Viola: Music for Viola and Piano by Women Composers of the 20th Century – Lament, Viola Sonata: Hillary Herndon (viola), Wei-Chun Bernadette Lo (piano). MSR 1416 (2012)
- Eclogues of Portugal: performed by pianist Marc Verter. Sidholme Music Room, 21 June 2018
- Chamber Works – Piano Trio, Violin Sonatina, Clarinet Quintet, Clarinet Sonata, Idle Dan (cello and piano), Sonnet (violin and piano), Drifting Away (clarinet and piano). Gould Piano Trio, Robert Plane, David Adams, Gary Pomeroy. Resonus RES10313 (2023)
- Danza Gaya: Music for Two Pianos, Simon Callaghan, Hiroaki Takenouchi. Includes Dance Little Lady. Lyrita SRCD433 (2024)
- Lonely Landscape: Chamber music and song. Cello Sonata, The Kindling of the Day, Septet, The Lonely Landscape, Octetto Pastorale, Four Pieces, Eight Poems of Walter de la Mare. Alice Neary (cello), James Gilchrist (tenor), Jâms Coleman (piano), Royal Welsh Chamber Players. Resonus Classics RES 10351 (2024)
