= Hever, Kent =

Village in Kent, England

Coordinates: 51.183°N 0.110°E

Hever
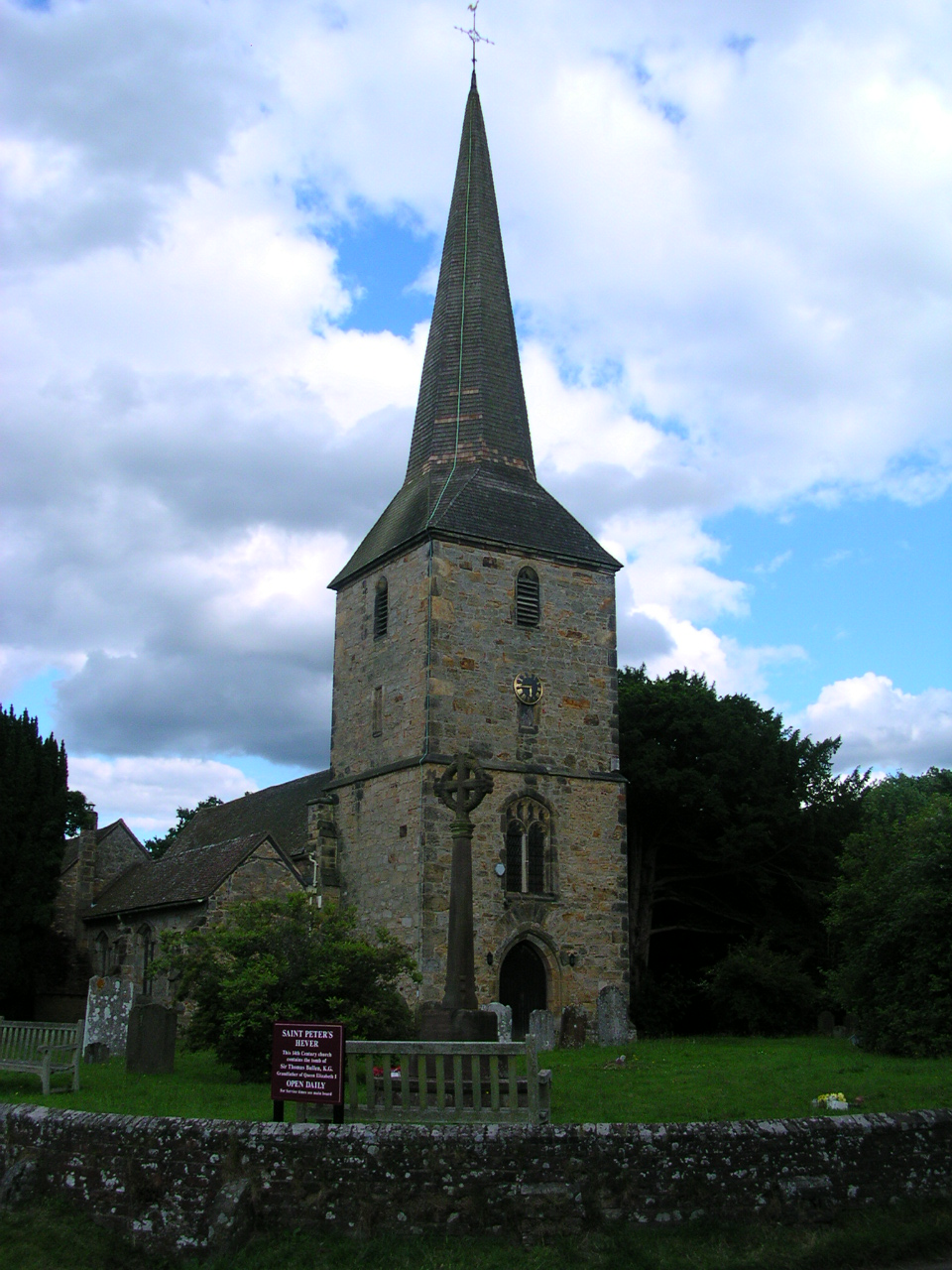
- St Peter's Hever, the parish church

- Location within Kent
- Population: 1,231 (2011)
- OS grid reference: TQ4744
- Civil parish: Hever
- District: Sevenoaks
- Shire county: Kent
- Region: South East
- Country: England
- Sovereign state: United Kingdom
- Post town: Edenbridge
- Postcode district: TN8
- Dialling code: 01732
- Police: Kent
- Fire: Kent
- Ambulance: South East Coast
- UK Parliament: Tonbridge

Hever is a village and civil parish in the Sevenoaks District of Kent, England. The parish is located on the River Eden, a tributary of the River Medway, east of Edenbridge. It is 5 miles (8 km) by 1-mile (1.6 km) in extent, and 3,062 acres (12.39 km^{2}) in area. The parish includes the villages of Four Elms, Hever itself, and Markbeech, and had a population of 1,136 in 2001, increasing to 1,231 at the 2011 Census.

The place-name 'Hever' may come from 'Heanyfre', meaning 'high edge', which is attested in Saxon charter S175 of 814, referring to an altogether different place.

Hever contains Hever Castle, the childhood home of Anne Boleyn, second wife of King Henry VIII.

There are three parish churches, one at each village. All are one united benefice. In the parish church of St Peter is the tomb of Thomas Boleyn, the father of Anne Boleyn and grandfather of Queen Elizabeth I.

Hever Church of England Primary School is near the centre of the village.

Hever railway station is 1.2 miles (1.9 km) west of the village by total road distance. It is on the Oxted line between Uckfield and Oxted, with services often continuing to London Bridge.

== See also ==
- Listed buildings in Hever, Kent
