= Holy Trinity Church, Crockham Hill =

Holy Trinity Church
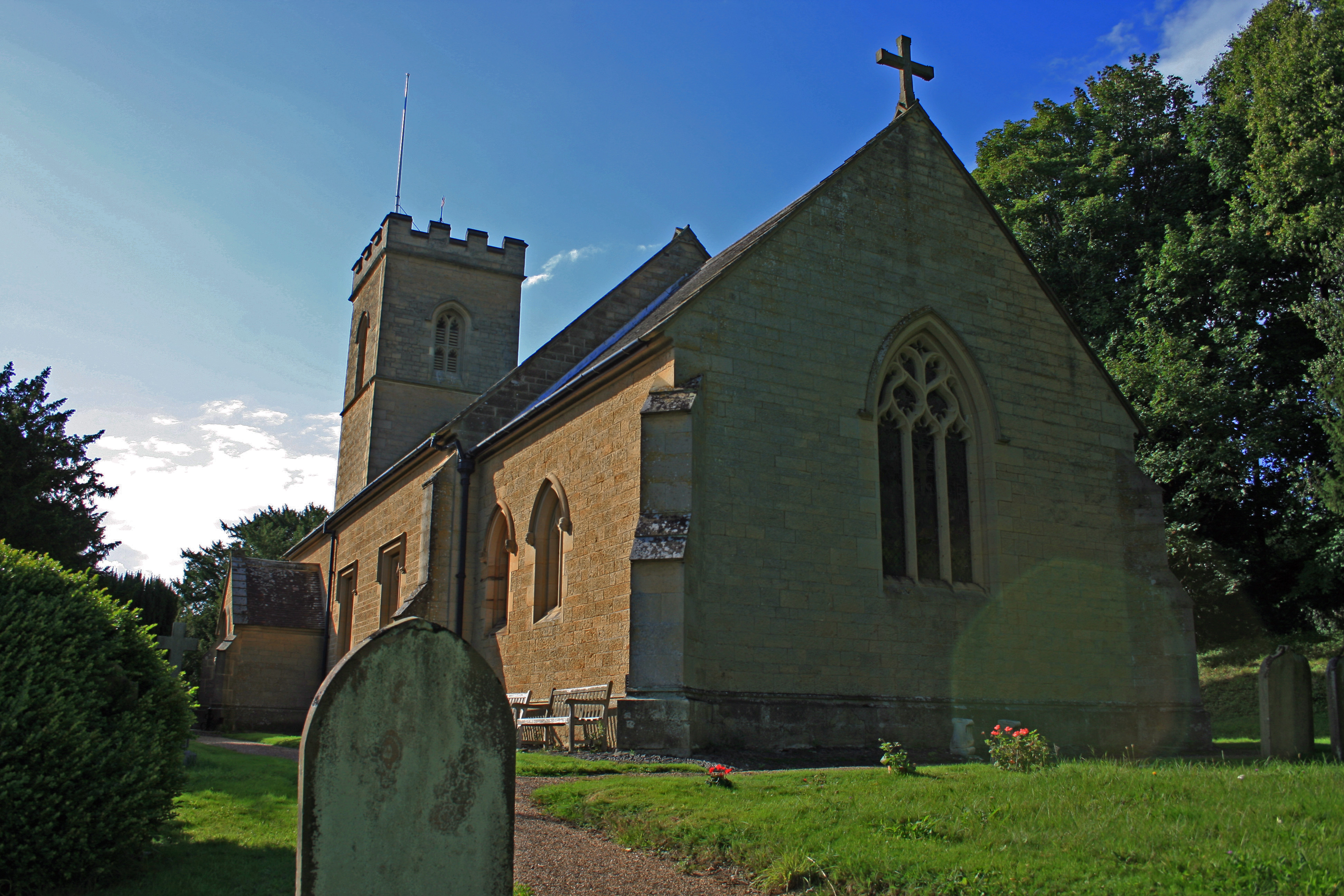
- Holy Trinity Church
- Holy Trinity Church
- 51.2374°N 0.0675°E
- OS grid reference: TQ 44424 50719
- Location: Crockham Hill
- Country: England
- Denomination: Anglican

History
- Status: parish church
- Founder: Charles Warde
- Dedication: Trinity
- Consecrated: 1842

Architecture
- Functional status: Active
- Heritage designation: Grade II
- Designated: 10 September 1954
- Completed: 1842

Specifications
- Materials: Stone

Administration
- Province: Canterbury
- Diocese: Rochester
- Deanery: Tonbridge
- Parish: Crockham Hill

Holy Trinity Church is a Church of England parish church based in Crockham Hill, Kent, England. It was constructed in 1842 and is a Grade II listed building.

== History ==
The idea for the construction of Holy Trinity Church came from Charles Warde from Westerham, who noticed there was no Church of England place of worship in Crockham Hill. Warde funded the construction of the church in 1842 with assistance from an endowment granted by his sister E Mildmay. Warde became patron of the church, establishing a tradition that a member of the Warde family would be a patron of the church – a tradition that currently continues. The church was granted Grade II listed building status in 1954 for its Victorian-medieval style architecture and original fittings. In 2019, the church was subject to a burglary and the original Victorian lectern was stolen.

The church's association with the social reformer Octavia Hill also provided a reason for its Grade II listed status. Hill lived in Crockham Hill and worshipped at the church. She was responsible for the purchase of the land surrounding the church for the National Trust. Hill is buried in Holy Trinity's churchyard under a yew tree; there is a memorial sarcophagus inside the church.

== Ecclesiastic use ==
After initial construction, the church was a part of the parish of Westerham St Mary's until 1845 when it became its own parish. In 1981, the Church of England decided that Holy Trinity Church's parish should be merged with that of nearby St Peter and St Paul's, Edenbridge, with an associate vicar taking services at Crockham Hill and the Warde patronage suspended. The decision was not popular locally due to the historical associations with Westerham being ignored, and the Bishop of Rochester appointed the future Archdeacon of Tonbridge Richard Mason as the priest-in-charge to smooth over relations. This situation continued until 2014, when Holy Trinity Church became its own independent parish again with the induction of a new vicar translated from St Mark's Church, Royal Tunbridge Wells.

== See also ==
- List of places of worship in Sevenoaks District
