= Lennox Cato =

British antiques dealer (born 1961)

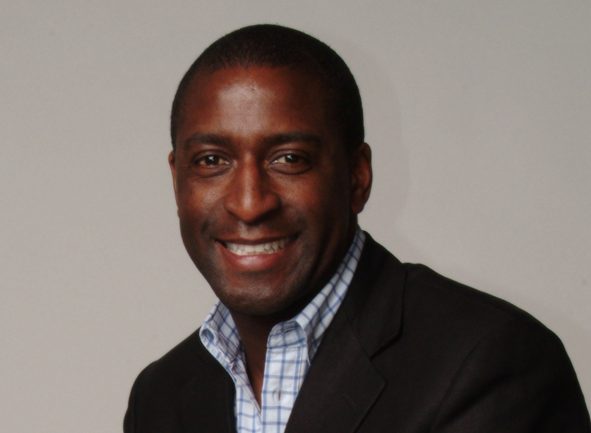
- Cato in 2003
- Born: 1961 (age 64–65)
- Occupation: Antiques dealer
- Known for: Antiques Roadshow specialist

Lennox Paul Cato (born 1961) is a British antiques dealer specialising in furniture and decorative items from the Georgian and Regency periods. He has been an expert on the BBC's Antiques Roadshow since 2004.

== Biography ==
The second to youngest of five children born to West Indian immigrants from Grenada, aged two months Lennox Cato and an older brother, Lincoln, were adopted by Brighton antiques dealer Dicky Compton, and his wife; the two boys kept their own surname. From his adoptive parents, he gained an early interest and expertise in antiques. Educated at Patcham Fawcett in Brighton, Cato left school at 16 and set up his first antique shop in The Lanes in Brighton in 1978; in 1985 he married Susan Clout in Brighton.

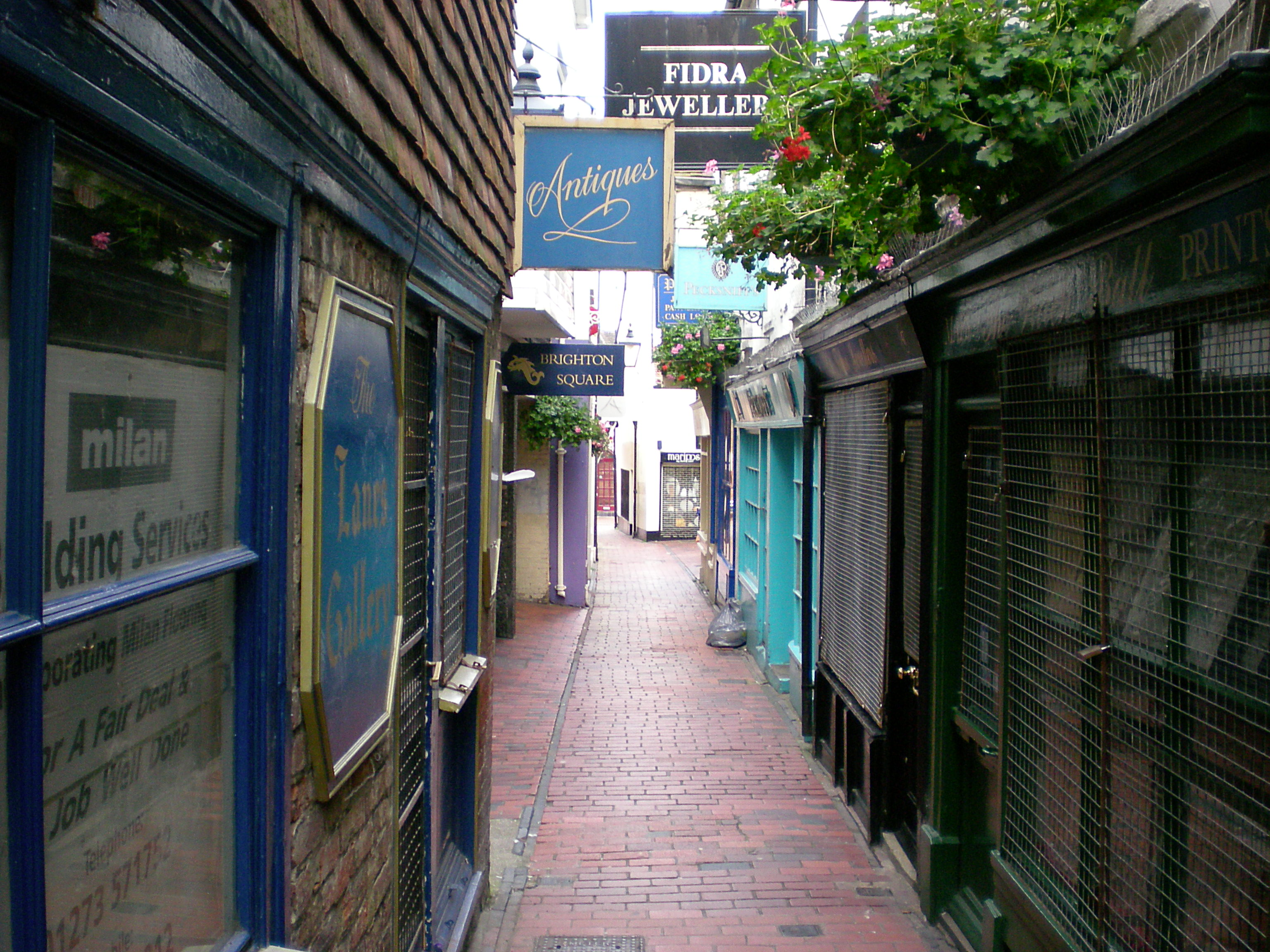
The Lanes in Brighton, where Cato had his first shop

After a short time at the shop in the Lanes, Cato opened a shop in Upper North Street, Brighton, at this time a well-known street of antique shops. Lennox Antiques, as the business was now known, remained there for about two years. He and his wife then moved to Lewes in East Sussex, dealing from a Georgian Palladian-fronted townhouse. The business was known as Coombe House Antiques, and is where their two children spent the early part of their lives. Eight years later, in 1997, they moved to Edenbridge in Kent, where he and Susan renamed the business as Lennox Cato Antiques. During this time, he was elected onto the local town council and spent eight years as a Conservative councillor; he also became a school governor at his son’s school, and later at the local primary school in Edenbridge.

In 2007, Cato acquired the adjoining shop and set up The Edenbridge Galleries, a specialist collective of antiques dealers all of whom are members of the BADA (British Antiques Dealers Association) and LAPADA (The Association of Art & Antiques Dealers). These were classed by The Independent as being among the fifty best antique shops in the UK.

In 1990, while at Coombe House, Cato became a member of the British Antique Dealers' Association (BADA). He has sat on its Council since 2004 representing Britain's 400 leading antique dealers. In 2007 he was appointed Country Vice Chairman. Having been short-listed in 2002 for the BACA Award (British Antiques & Collectables Awards) for Best General Antique Dealer in the South of England, he went on to win the title in 2003 at The Dorchester.

He joined the BBC's Antiques Roadshow as a furniture specialist in 2004, and has appeared on the programme regularly ever since. This was not Cato’s first foray into television; he has also appeared in the game show Going for a Song with Michael Parkinson; in a televised interview with Judith Miller at the Edenbridge premises and featured on ITV’s Tales from the Country. In 2011, Cato became a member of the Company of Art Scholars and in 2013 received the Freedom of the City. In 2002, Cato and his wife started the ‘Antique Dealers V Auctioneers Charity Football Match’, to raise money for The Haven, Breast Cancer Support Centres. Over the nine years that he ran it, Cato raised more than £40,000. The event is still going strong and the winners now receive the Lennox Cato Cup.
