= Markbeech =

Village in Kent, England

Coordinates: 51°09′55″N 0°06′29″E

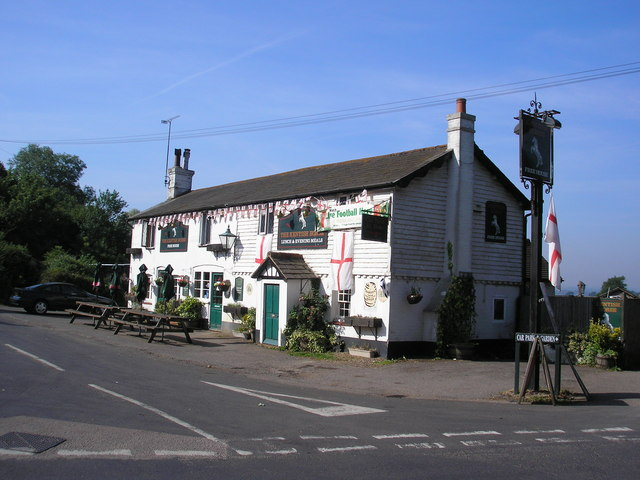
- The Kentish Horse, Markbeech

- Location within Kent
- Civil parish: Hever
- District: Sevenoaks
- Shire county: Kent
- Region: South East
- Country: England
- Sovereign state: United Kingdom
- Post town: EDENBRIDGE
- Postcode district: TN8
- Police: Kent
- Fire: Kent
- Ambulance: South East Coast
- UK Parliament: Tonbridge

Markbeech (sometimes styled Mark Beech) is a village in the civil parish of Hever in the Sevenoaks district of Kent, England. The village is located on the northern ridges of the High Weald, nine miles (14 km) north-west of Tunbridge Wells.

The church, part of a united benefice with Hever and Four Elms, is dedicated to the Holy Trinity. There is a village hall, a pub – The Kentish Horse – and a cricket club.
