= Haxted Watermill =

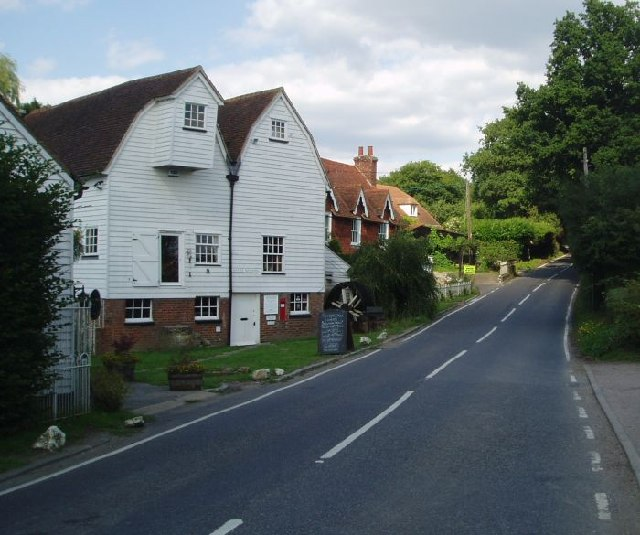

- Location within Surrey
- 51°11′28″N 0°01′49″E
- Type: Watermill
- Location: Haxted Road, Lingfield
- OS grid reference: TQ 41859 45507

History
- Built: ca 1680

Site notes
- Area: Surrey

Listed Building – Grade II
- Official name: Haxted Mill
- Designated: 11 Jun 1958
- Reference no.: 1029920

Haxted Watermill is a much-restored Grade II listed watermill in Surrey, England, close to the border with Kent, and is powered by the River Eden.

== History ==
The mill was first mentioned in the will of Sir Reginald de Cobham in 1361. The western half of the current building, constructed on the foundations of the 14th Century mill, dates to about 1680 and the eastern half dates to 1797. The mill was last used to grind flour in 1919 but worked until 1945, grinding meal for local farmers. The last miller was Thomas Stanford whose family had operated the mill for the previous two centuries. Purchased by Mr Woodrow in 1949, he spent the next twenty years restoring the machinery to working order. The mill was opened as a museum of water milling and water pumping in 1966. In recent years it has operated as a bar and brasserie but is now closed. In 2016, planning permission was granted to site three shepherd huts on the adjoining site as guest accommodation for visitors to the mill.

== Machinery ==
The current overshot waterwheel has a diameter of 10 feet (3.0 m) and a width of 9 feet (2.7 m). It was installed in about 1830, but by 1972 the 72 iron buckets had failed and were replaced by fibreglass replicas. The bearing-stone for an earlier, undershot waterwheel was found during renovation and this dates to the fourteenth century. In full working order the current wheel produced about 11 horsepower (8.2 kW), rotating at 8 r.p.m. and driving three pairs of millstones, through gearing, at 120 r.p.m. The pit wheel and wallower are of the same date as the waterwheel, but the great spur wheel, made of oak with applewood teeth, has been dated to 1680. The mill originally operated three pairs of French burr millstones. At some stage a fourth pair was added, driven from a shaft off the crown wheel, but this was too much for the machinery and was disconnected.
