= Crockham Hill =

Village in Kent, England

Coordinates: 51.235973°N 0.064405°E

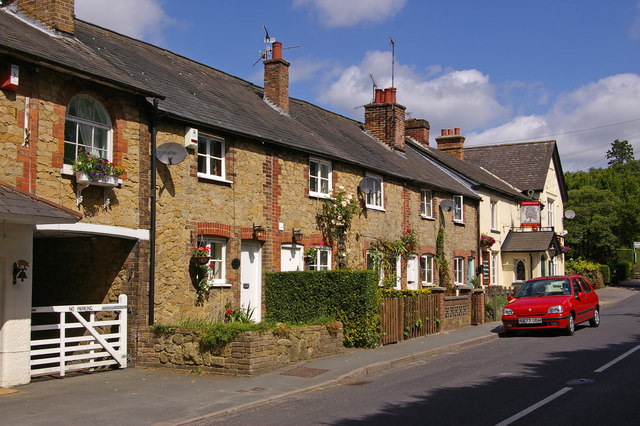
- Royal Oak Cottages, Crockham Hill

- Location within Kent
- Population: 270
- OS grid reference: TQ442505
- District: Sevenoaks
- Shire county: Kent
- Region: South East
- Country: England
- Sovereign state: United Kingdom
- Post town: Edenbridge
- Postcode district: TN8
- Dialling code: 01732
- Police: Kent
- Fire: Kent
- Ambulance: South East Coast
- UK Parliament: Sevenoaks

Crockham Hill is a village in the Sevenoaks district of Kent, England. It is about 3 miles (5 km) south of Westerham, and Chartwell is nearby. The village has a population of around 270 people. It contains a 19th-century pub, the Royal Oak, and Holy Trinity church.

== Etymology ==
Crockham Hill comes from the Old English 'crundel' meaning a 'chalk-pit, quarry' with 'ham' as a 'village, homestead' and 'hyll' for 'hill'; therefore, the 'quarry village on the hill'.

== History ==
The village street is on the line of a Roman road, the London to Lewes Way.

Initially a cider house and inn, the buildings of the Royal Oak pub are thought to be at least 500 years old. The Inn had a 35-foot well, which was used by pilgrims on their way to Archbishop of Canterbury Thomas Becket's tomb in Canterbury and, in the 1950s, was recorded as a possible safe supply of drinking water in the event of atomic warfare.

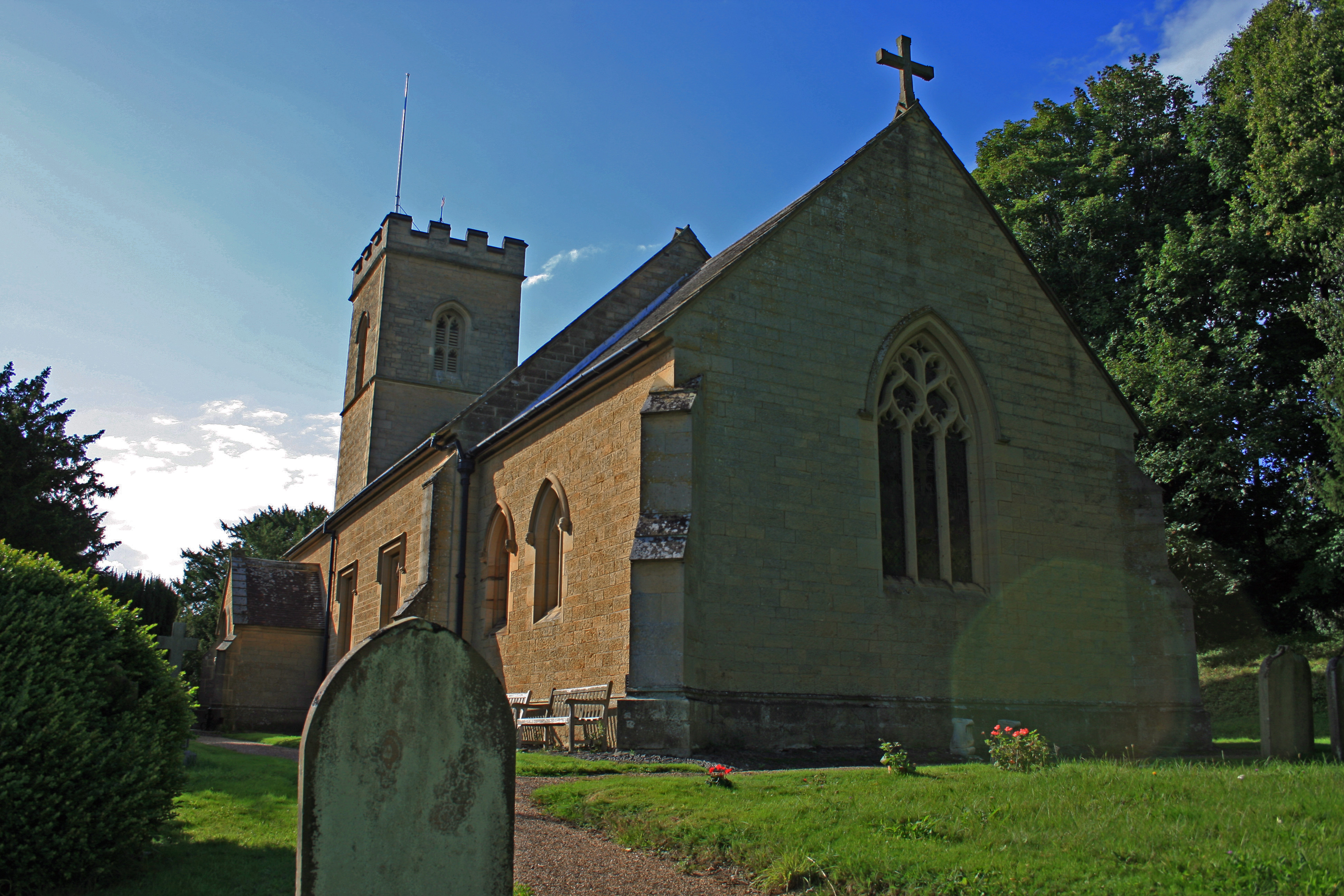
Holy Trinity Church

Holy Trinity Church, a Church of England parish church, was constructed in 1842, in the Gothic Revival style. It is a Grade II listed building, of stone construction with a hammerbeam roof.

Crockham Hill Church of England Primary School was built below Holy Trinity Church in 1867 at a cost of £1,252. The school was enlarged and modernised after the First World War, and again in 1922 when a new classroom and cloakroom were added.

In 1872, John Marius Wilson's Imperial Gazetteer of England and Wales gave the follow description of the village:

Crockham-Hill, a chapelry in Westerham parish, Kent: at the boundary with Surrey, 2 miles N of Eden-bridge r. station, and 2¼ S of Westerham. It was constituted in 1842. Post town, Edenbridge. Rated property, £1, 930. Pop., 542. Houses, 108. The property is subdivided. A hill which gives name to the chapelry commands an extensive panoramic view. The living is a vicarage in the diocese of Canterbury. Value, £105.* Patron, Mrs. W. St. John Mildmay. The church is good.

== Notable residents ==
- Octavia Hill, a social reformer, philanthropist, artist, writer and co-founder of the National Trust, lived in the village. Her remains are buried in the churchyard of the village church, Holy Trinity, and there is a memorial sarcophagus inside the church.
- Constance Garnett, translator of nineteenth-century Russian literature, lived and died at "The Cearne", off the Kent Hatch Road. In addition to producing the first English language translations of Fyodor Dostoevsky and Anton Chekhov, Garnett translated the complete works of Ivan Turgenev and Nikolai Gogol, and the major works of Leo Tolstoy.
- Composer Pamela Harrison and her husband, the conductor Harvey Phillips, lived at "The Cearne", Crockham Hill from the late 1940s into the 1960s. Gordon Jacob's Sinfonietta No 2 (The Cearne) of 1954, written specifically for the Harvey Phillips String Orchestra, was named after the house.
- Eric M. Rogers, author and physics educator, grew up in Crockham Hill.
- Edward Garnett, writer, editor, associated with early 20th century authors, husband of Constance Garnett, lived at "The Cearne", a house built for him by his brother-in-law William Harrison Cowlishaw. Hilaire Belloc, Joseph Conrad, Edward Thomas and D. H. Lawrence stayed there. Lawrence wrote his poem At the Cearne to commemorate his visit.
- David Garnett, writer, member of the Bloomsbury group, son of Edward and Constance Garnett, grew up in Crockham Hill.
- Barrie Russell Jones, ophthalmologist, ophthalmic surgeon, and pioneer of preventive ophthalmology.
