= Edenbridge, Kent =

Town in Kent, England

Coordinates: 51.197°N 0.065°E

Edenbridge
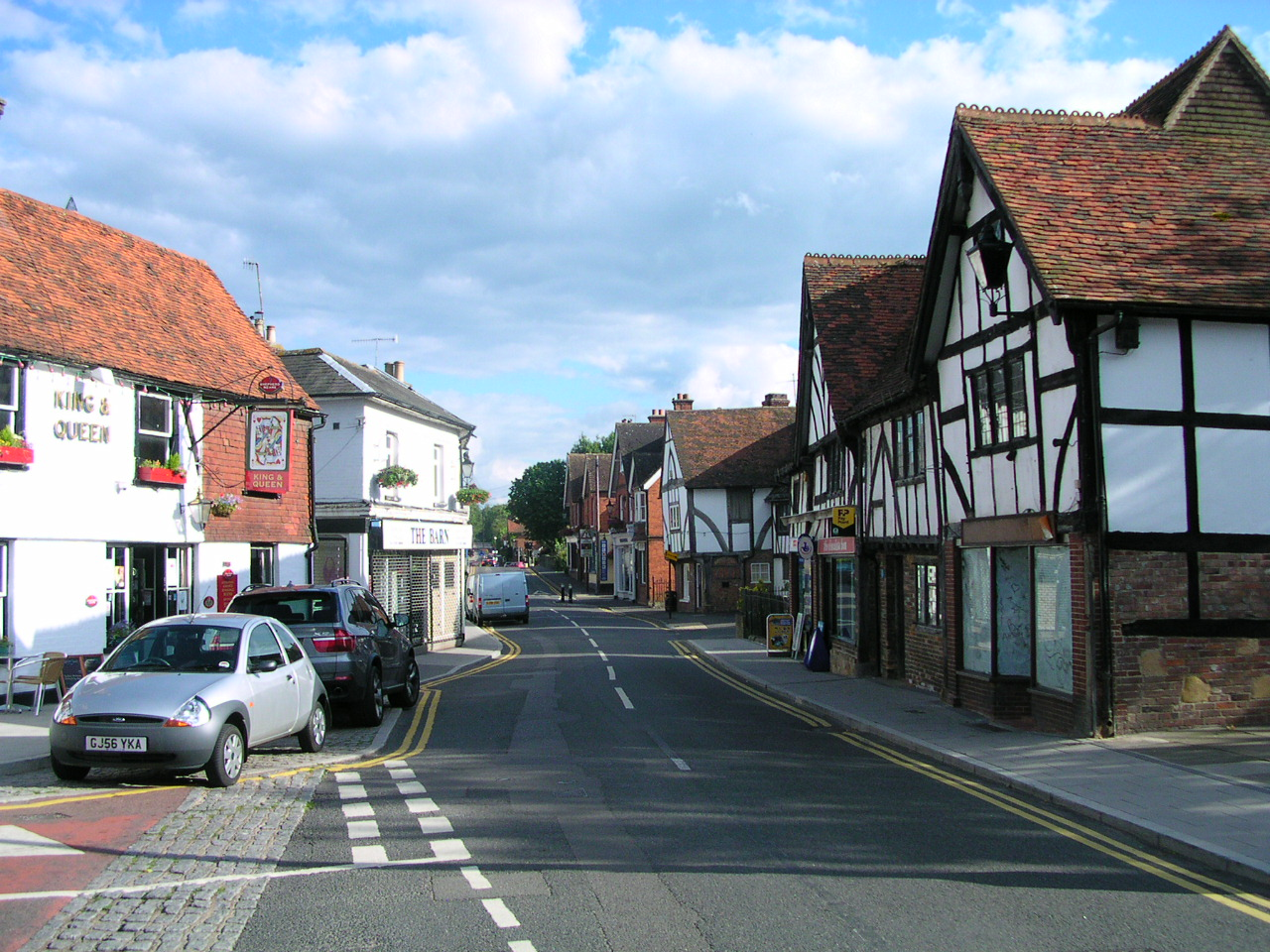
- The old town

- Location within Kent
- Population: 7,808; 8,907 (2011 Census)
- OS grid reference: TQ445465
  - London: 18 mi (29 km)
- Civil parish: Edenbridge
- District: Sevenoaks
- Shire county: Kent
- Region: South East
- Country: England
- Sovereign state: United Kingdom
- Post town: EDENBRIDGE
- Postcode district: TN8
- Dialling code: 01732
- Police: Kent
- Fire: Kent
- Ambulance: South East Coast
- UK Parliament: Tonbridge

Edenbridge is a town and civil parish in the Sevenoaks district of Kent, England. Its name derives from Old English Eadhelmsbrigge (meaning "Eadhelm's Bridge"). It is located on the border of Kent and Surrey, on the upper floodplain of the River Medway and takes its name from that river's tributary, the River Eden. The town had a population of 7,808 in 2011.

== History ==
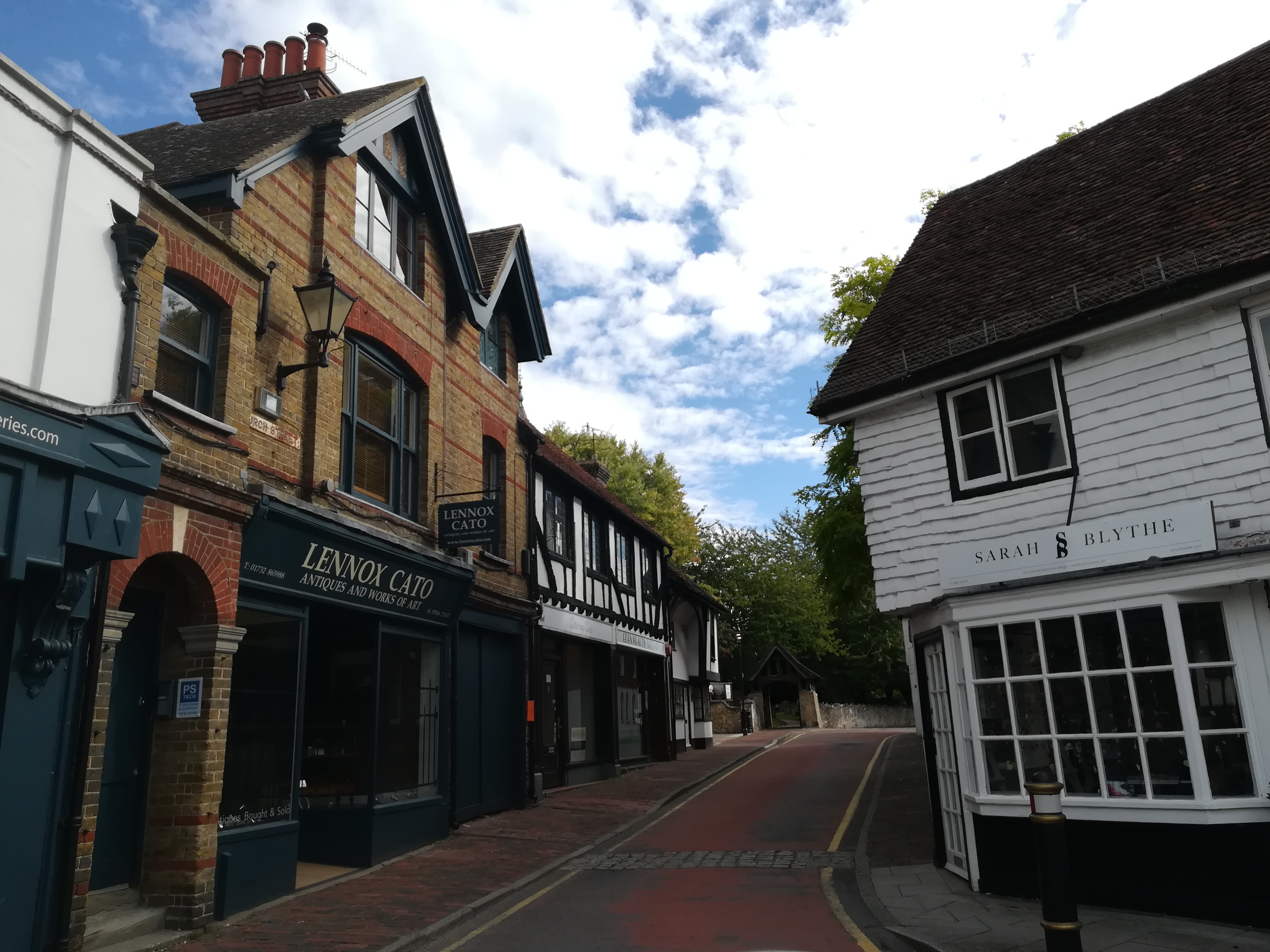
The old town of Edenbridge in 2018

The old part of the town grew along a section of the otherwise disused Roman road, the London to Lewes Way at the point where it crossed the river. Iron slag from iron smelting in the surrounding area was used in building the road. In the Middle Ages it became a centre of the Wealden iron industry. There are many mediaeval timber buildings in the town, one of which houses the Eden Valley Museum.

With the coming of the railways the town expanded and the community of Marlpit Hill, north of the original settlement, is now part of the town.

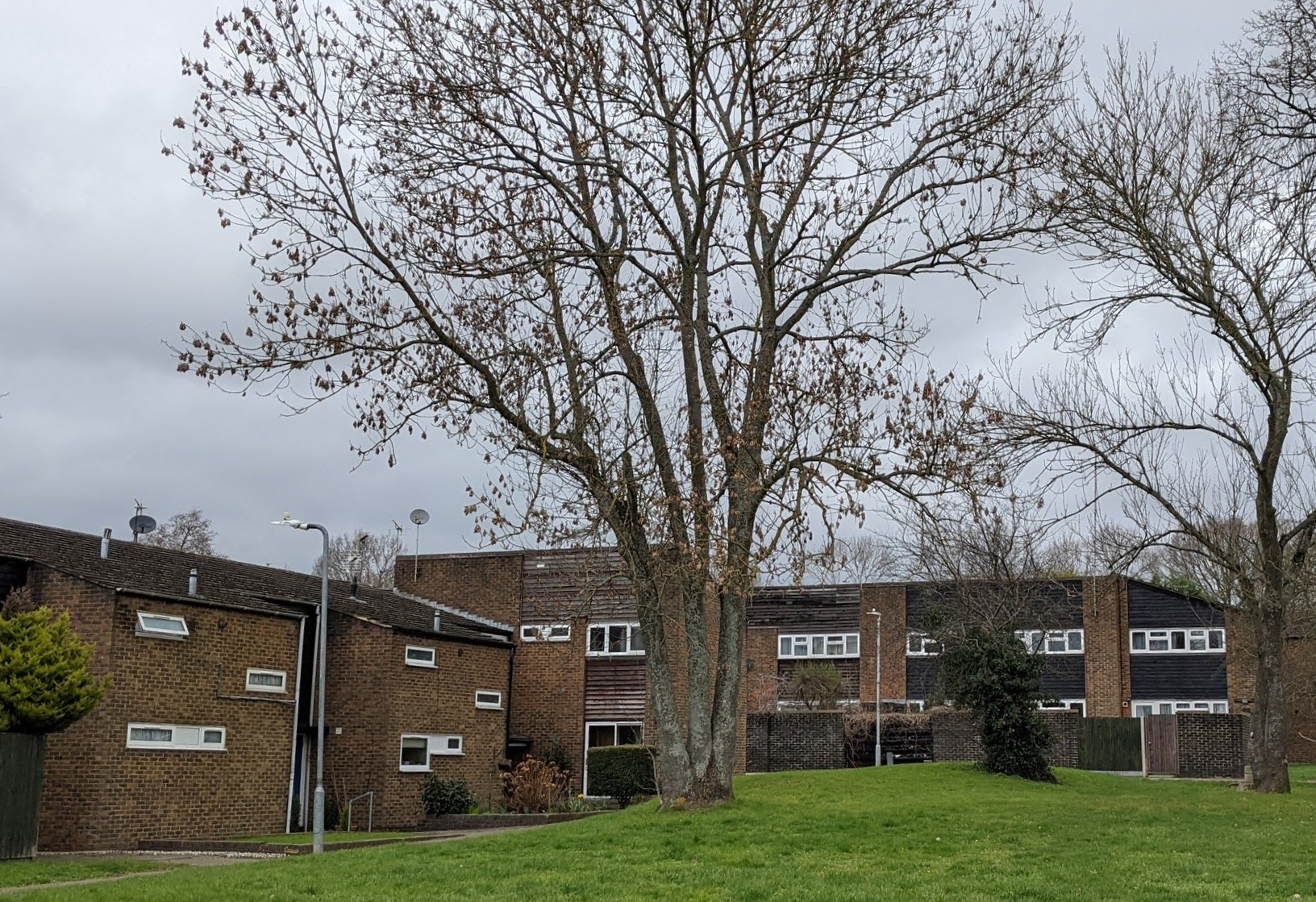
Spitals Cross estate

After World War II, the London County Council built two modernist housing estates at Stangrove Park and Spitals Cross.

Owing to its position on the River Eden floodplain, the centre of the town is prone to severe flooding. The worst flood occurred in 1958, before any flood defences were built, and led to enormous damage to the High Street. Ten years later in 1968, despite the Eden having been dredged to prevent the same occurrence, the town was once again flooded after heavy storms in September. Although there were no fatalities, a helicopter was needed to save a man from his flooded home. Local legend has it that he hadn't noticed the flood waters rising, having been too engrossed in The Forsyte Saga on television. More adequate flood defences have been built since then, with the local community now well prepared to deal with possible flooding. In December 2019 the town was "paralysed" when the river again burst its banks.

== Mills ==
Edenbridge has had four mills over the centuries, Haxted Mill and Honour's Mill on the River Eden, Christmas Mill on a tributary of the Eden, and a windmill to the south of the town. All four mill buildings survive, but now converted to other uses.

== Railways ==
There are two railway stations serving Edenbridge. The earliest, on the South Eastern Railway (SER) route from Redhill to Tonbridge, was opened on 26 May 1842. The station, simply named Edenbridge, is located in Marlpit Hill. To the west of that station the route crosses what was once the London, Brighton and South Coast Railway main line from London to Tunbridge Wells and Eastbourne (via Lewes), opened on 2 January 1888. The crossing of the two lines takes place at a mid-break in the Edenbridge Tunnel on the SER line. The second station, named Edenbridge Town is about a mile South-east of this point. The line serving it is now truncated at Uckfield. There is no connection here between the two routes: Edenbridge is not a junction; one existed four miles (6 km) to the west of Edenbridge Town at Crowhurst, but that junction with the Oxted to East Grinstead line no longer exists. Severe damage to the embankments of both the SER line and the East Grinstead line occurred following the excessive rains in the winter of 2019/2020 but was repaired after extensive works by end of March 2020.

All services at both stations are operated by Southern, which manages both stations.

Edenbridge Station is served by an hourly shuttle service (half-hourly during the peak periods) between Redhill and Tonbridge. Edenbridge Town Station is served by an hourly service (half-hourly during the peak periods) between London Bridge and Uckfield. On Sundays this service terminates at Oxted instead of London Bridge.

== Town ==
Edenbridge is twinned with Mont-Saint-Aignan in Normandy in France. The inner relief road that was built in the early 2000s to relieve traffic pressure on the old, narrow High Street is named Mont St Aignan Way. There are now no banks in the town (just a mobile bank at the small Thursday market), a post office next to St Lawrence's RC church, and a number of major retail chains.

The Edenbridge Memorial Health Centre replaced a separate minor injuries unit, the Edenbridge War Memorial Hospital (initially a cottage hospital built to care for soldiers returning from The First World War), and the GP surgery in 2023.

The Edenbridge Bonfire Society burned an effigy of former prime minister Liz Truss and a lettuce on a bonfire on Guy Fawkes Night 2022. The 11-metre (36 ft) high effigy held a box with a copy of the Guinness Book of Records, referencing her record as the shortest-serving prime minister. The box also contained a copy of her mini-budget, a T-shirt with the slogan "I am a fighter, not a quitter", and a £115 cheque referring to the continual funding for ex-prime ministers.

== Parish and places of worship ==
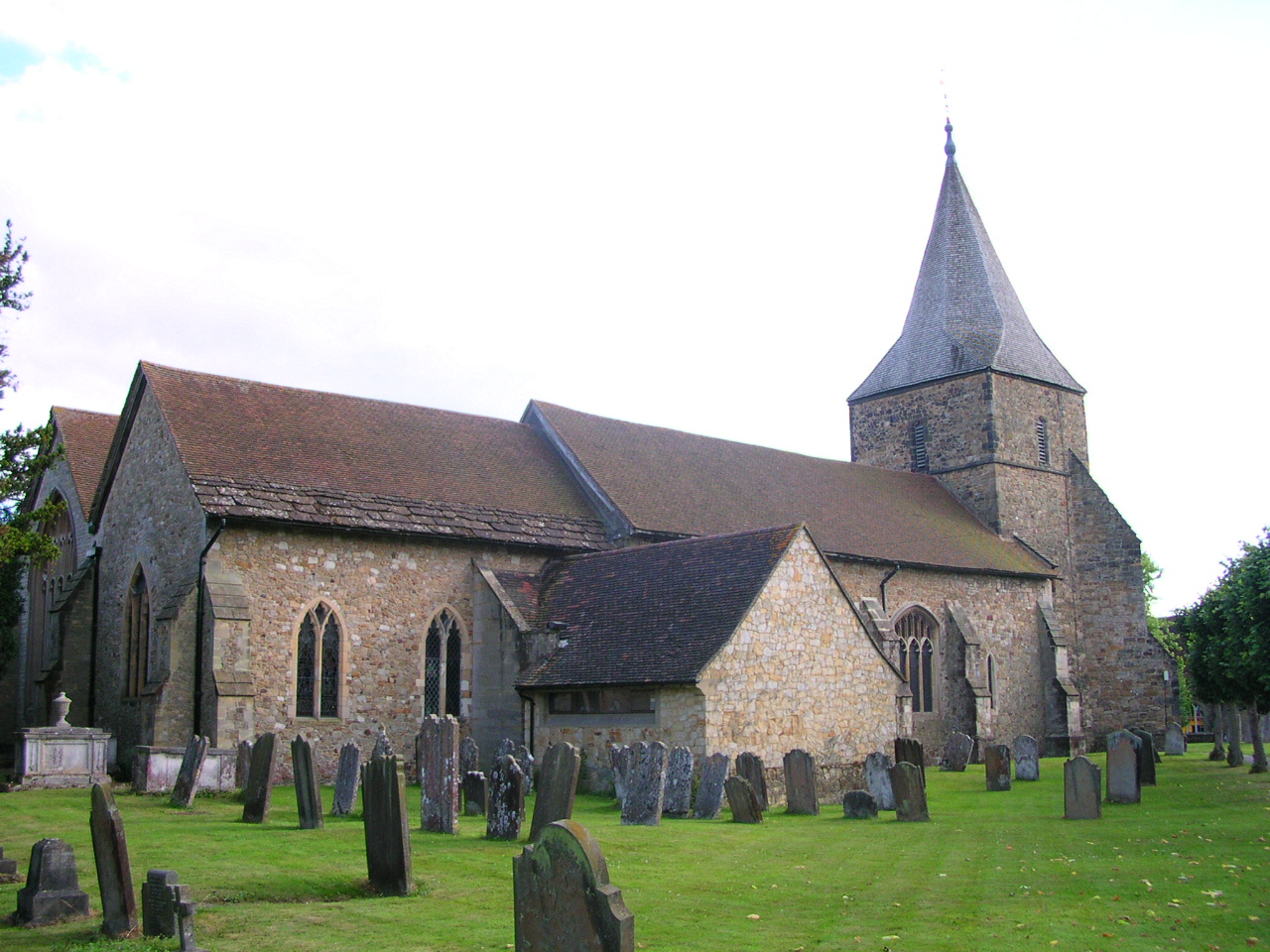
Church of St. Peter and St. Paul

The 13th-century Anglican parish church of Church of St Peter and St Paul is a Grade I-listed building . It has a set of windows by Sir Edward Burne-Jones in the east wall. The church contains examples of medieval graffiti including ritual protection marks such as the VV symbol. A Baptist chapel on the High Street was registered for marriages in 1860. It was the home of the Edenbridge Baptist Church, which re-combined with its 'daughter' church at Marlpit Hill in 2003 to form the Eden Church, which moved in 2013 to The Eden Centre.

Roman Catholics worship at St Lawrence's Church, registered in 1933.

Also in the parish is the hamlet of Marsh Green. Two places of worship are located here: St John's United Reformed Church and a Kingdom Hall which serves the Oxted Congregation of Jehovah's Witnesses. It was registered for marriages in 1999.

The Grade II-listed former Ebenezer Chapel, used by Independent Calvinists and later by Strict Baptists, stands on Edenbridge High Street. It is now a community café and meeting place. In the Marlpit Hill area of the town, St Paulinus' Church Centre is used as a pre school and a village hall. Nearby, Marlpit Hill Baptist Church (built in the late 19th century) re-combined with its former parent (see above) to form the Eden Church, but the building has since been demolished to be replaced by housing.

== Media ==
Local news and television programmes are provided by both BBC South East and BBC London on BBC One & ITV Meridian and ITV London on ITV1. Television signals are received from either the Tunbridge Wells (Meridian) or Crystal Palace (London) TV transmitters.

Local radio stations are BBC Radio Kent, Heart South, Gold and KMFM West Kent.

Edenbridge is served by the local newspaper, Edenbridge Chronicle.

== Climate ==
Climate data for Bough Beech (1991–2020)
Month	Jan	Feb	Mar	Apr	May	Jun	Jul	Aug	Sep	Oct	Nov	Dec	Year
Mean daily maximum °C (°F)	8.1 (46.6)	8.6 (47.5)	11.3 (52.3)	14.3 (57.7)	17.4 (63.3)	20.4 (68.7)	22.7 (72.9)	22.5 (72.5)	19.5 (67.1)	15.4 (59.7)	11.4 (52.5)	8.6 (47.5)	15.1 (59.2)
Mean daily minimum °C (°F)	1.2 (34.2)	1.0 (33.8)	2.5 (36.5)	3.9 (39.0)	6.9 (44.4)	9.7 (49.5)	11.9 (53.4)	11.6 (52.9)	9.1 (48.4)	6.5 (43.7)	3.5 (38.3)	1.6 (34.9)	5.8 (42.4)
Average rainfall mm (inches)	78.4 (3.09)	54.3 (2.14)	44.7 (1.76)	46.8 (1.84)	50.6 (1.99)	48.3 (1.90)	48.5 (1.91)	56.6 (2.23)	52.7 (2.07)	80.2 (3.16)	86.0 (3.39)	83.2 (3.28)	730.7 (28.77)
Average rainy days (≥ 1 mm)	12.3	10.3	8.8	8.8	8.3	8.3	7.5	8.1	8.4	11.6	13.0	12.2	117.9
Mean monthly sunshine hours	47.1	75.2	115.9	170.8	208.5	209.3	224.9	202.1	153.0	110.1	59.3	52.8	1,629.5
Source: Met Office

== People ==
- Walter Galpin Alcock (1861–1947), organist and composer, who had the unique distinction of playing the organ at the Coronations of Edward VII, George V and George VI, was born in Edenbridge.
- Ralph Bagnold (1896–1990), desert explorer, lived in Edenbridge in his final years.
- David Henry Bartleet (1929–2001) was vicar of Edenbridge.
- Tony Burns (b 1944), football player and manager, was born in Edenbridge.
- Lennox Cato (b 1962), expert on the Antiques Roadshow, lives in the town.
- Tom Chatfield (b 1980), author, lives in the town.
- Rob Cross (b 1990), professional darts player, lives in the town.
- Norman Fraser (1904–1986), concert pianist and composer, lived at Stangrove House in the 1960s.
- Mike Manley (b 1964), CEO of Fiat Chrysler Automobiles
- Jasper Maskelyne (1902–1973), magician, grew up in Edenbridge.
- John Surtees (1934–2017), world champion motorcycle racer and Formula One racing driver, had his workshop in Edenbridge.
- Henry Surtees (1991–2009), racing driver and son of John, lived in Edenbridge.
- William Taillour (1406–83), Lord Mayor of London in 1468, lived in Edenbridge.
- Tom Tugendhat (b 1973), Conservative Member of Parliament for Tonbridge, lives in Edenbridge, within his constituency.

== See also ==
- List of places of worship in Sevenoaks (district)
- Listed buildings in Edenbridge, Kent
