= 1615 =

1615 in various calendars
- Gregorian calendar: 1615; MDCXV
- Ab urbe condita: 2368
- Armenian calendar: 1064; ԹՎ ՌԿԴ
- Assyrian calendar: 6365
- Balinese saka calendar: 1536–1537
- Bengali calendar: 1021–1022
- Berber calendar: 2565
- English Regnal year: 12 Ja. 1 – 13 Ja. 1
- Buddhist calendar: 2159
- Burmese calendar: 977
- Byzantine calendar: 7123–7124
- Chinese calendar: 甲寅年 (Wood Tiger); 4312 or 4105 — to — 乙卯年 (Wood Rabbit); 4313 or 4106
- Coptic calendar: 1331–1332
- Discordian calendar: 2781
- Ethiopian calendar: 1607–1608
- Hebrew calendar: 5375–5376
- Hindu calendars
- Vikram Samvat: 1671–1672
- Shaka Samvat: 1536–1537
- Kali Yuga: 4715–4716
- Holocene calendar: 11615
- Igbo calendar: 615–616
- Iranian calendar: 993–994
- Islamic calendar: 1023–1024
- Japanese calendar: Keichō 20 / Genna 1 (元和元年)
- Javanese calendar: 1535–1536
- Julian calendar: Gregorian minus 10 days
- Korean calendar: 3948
- Minguo calendar: 297 before ROC 民前297年
- Nanakshahi calendar: 147
- Thai solar calendar: 2157–2158
- Tibetan calendar: ཤིང་ཕོ་སྟག་ལོ་ (male Wood-Tiger); 1741 or 1360 or 588 — to — ཤིང་མོ་ཡོས་ལོ་ (female Wood-Hare); 1742 or 1361 or 589

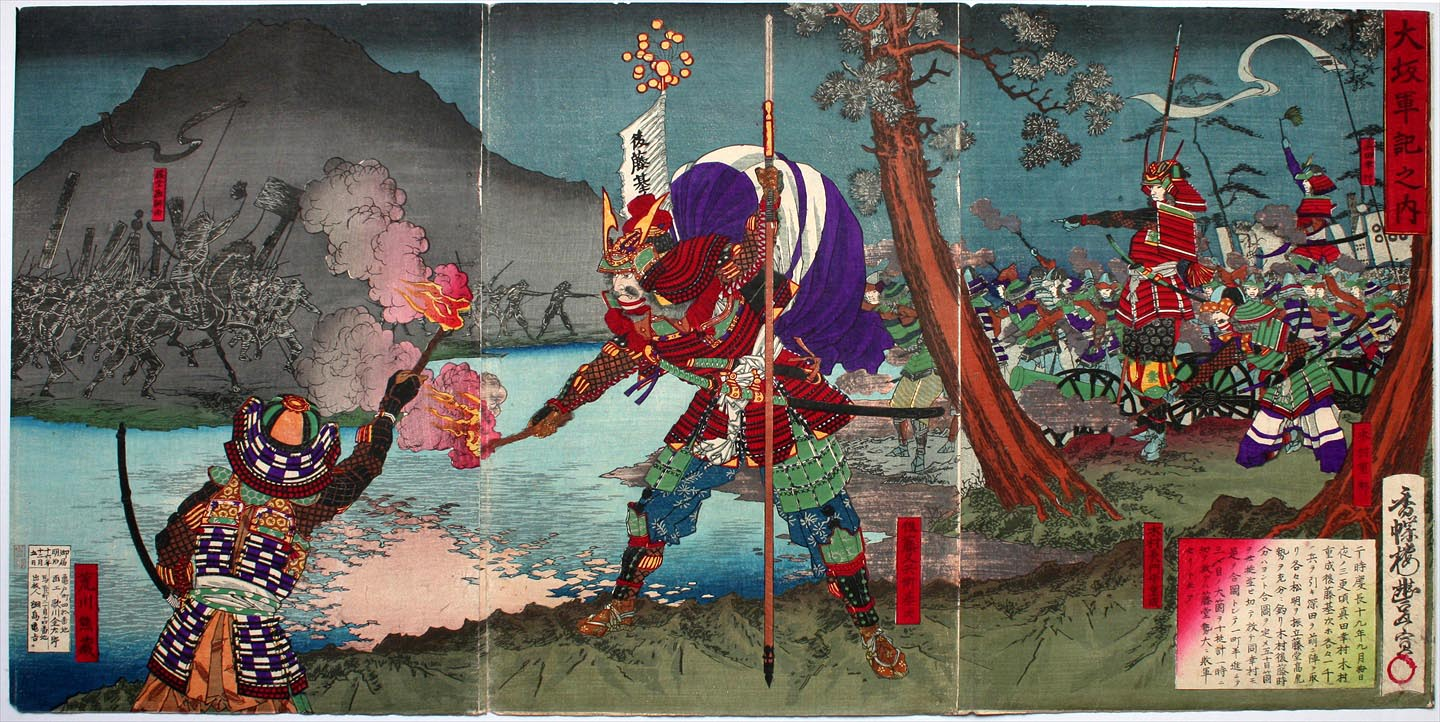
June 3: Battle of Dōmyōji

1615 (MDCXV) was a common year starting on Thursday of the Gregorian calendar and a common year starting on Sunday of the Julian calendar, the 1615th year of the Common Era (CE) and Anno Domini (AD) designations, the 615th year of the 2nd millennium, the 15th year of the 17th century, and the 6th year of the 1610s decade. As of the start of 1615, the Gregorian calendar was 10 days ahead of the Julian calendar, which remained in localized use until 1923.

== Events ==
=== January–March ===
- January 1 – The New Netherland Company is granted a three-year monopoly in North American trade, between the 40th and 45th parallels.
- January 30 – Japan's diplomatic mission to Europe, led by Hasekura Tsunenaga, meets with King Philip III of Spain at Madrid and presents an offer of a treaty.
- February 2 – Sir Thomas Roe sets out to become the first ambassador from the court of the King of England to the Mughal Emperor Jahangir, departing from Tilbury Hope on the ship Lyon under the command of captain Christopher Newport.
- February 17 – Japan's envoy to Europe, Hasekura Tsunenaga, receives a Christian baptism by the royal chaplain, Diego de Guzmán, and receives the European name Felipe Francisco Hasekura.
- March 10 – John Ogilvie, a Jesuit priest, is hanged and drawn at Glasgow Cross in Scotland for refusing to pledge allegiance to King James VI of Scotland; he will be canonised in 1976, becoming the only post-Reformation Scottish saint.

=== April–June ===
- April 21 – The Wignacourt Aqueduct is inaugurated in Malta.
- May 6 – The Peace of Tyrnau is signed between Matthias, Holy Roman Emperor, and Gábor Bethlen.
- June 2 – The first Récollet missionaries arrive at Quebec City, from Rouen, France.
- June 3 – The Eastern Army of Tokugawa Ieyasu and the Osaka Army of Toyotomi Hideyori clash during the Battle of Dōmyōji and the Battle of Tennōji.
- June 4 – Forces under shōgun Tokugawa Ieyasu take Osaka Castle in Japan, beginning a period of peace which lasts nearly 250 years. Bands of Christian samurai support Ieyasu's enemies at the Battle of Osaka.
- June 21 – The Peace of Asti is concluded between the Spanish Empire and Savoy.

=== July–September ===
- July 7 – In Japan, the Buke shohatto, a 19-section law setting a standard of conduct for individual warlords (daimyo) and their responsibilities to the Tokugawa shogunate, is proclaimed by the shogun Tokugawa Hidetada before the assembled daimyo at Fushimi Castle in Kyoto.
- August 9 – Swedish troops led by King Gustavus Adolphus begin the siege of the Russian city of Pskov, but fail to take the fortress after 12 weeks. The siege ends on October 27.
- August 20 – Alvaro III Nimi a Mpanzu becomes the new ruler of the Kingdom of Kongo (located in southwestern Africa in what is now Angola) upon the death of his brother, Bernardo II Nimi a Nkanga.
- August 30 – A Spanish treasure fleet of 41 ships is struck in the Gulf of Mexico by a powerful storm that sinks the ship San Miguel
- September 12 – The San Leoncio Day hurricane strikes the islands of Puerto Rico and Hispaniola.
- September 16 – An estimated 7.5 magnitude earthquake strikes Arica (now part of Chile in the Spanish colonial Viceroyalty of Peru and collapses the city's fort, but causes no deaths.
- September 17 – Los Baños, Laguna, is founded by Spanish colonists on Luzon island in the Philippines.
- September 20 – Japanese diplomat Hasekura Tsunenaga and his entourage become the first officials from Japan to visit Italy, and are received in Rome by Cardinal Burgecio

=== October–December ===
- October 5 – The Spánverjavígin, the last massacre to be carried out in Iceland, begins as 14 Basque Whalers from Spain are murdered at Thingeyri while sleeping. Another 18 are killed on October 13, including Captain Martín de Villafranca. The 31 had been survivors of a shipwreck on Iceland in September.
- October 27 – In Russia, the siege of Pskov ends with the withdrawal of Swedish Army troops. The siege is the last battle of the Ingrian War.
- November 3 – Japanese diplomat Hasekura Tsunenaga and his delegation are received by Pope Paul V in Rome, and present a request for trade between the Roman Catholic Church and the Japanese shogunate
- November 7 – The Portuguese freighter Nossa Senhora da Luz, carrying 150 crew and a cargo of Chinese and Burmese goods, sinks in a storm near the Azores.
- November 22 – Alexandru Movilă is installed as Prince of Moldavia by Poland as Prince Ștefan IX Tomșa is driven from the throne.
- November 24 – King Louis XIII of France marries Princess Ana María Mauricia, the 14-year-old daughter of King Philip III of Spain. The two had been legally united in a marriage by proxy on October 18.
- November – The Mughals under Jahangir launch the first offensive against Kajali, a border post of the Ahom kingdom.
- December 2 – In the Venetian Republic, Giovanni Bembo is elected chief executive as the new Doge of Venice after the October 31 death of Marcantonio Memmo.
- December 6 – In England, John Winthrop, later governor of the future Massachusetts Bay Colony, marries his second wife (of four), Thomasine Clopton, daughter of William Clopton of Castleins, near Groton, Suffolk.
- December 18 – Francisco de Borja y Aragón becomes the new Viceroy of Peru, a colony of Spain encompassing all of Spanish language-speaking South America and what are now the nations of Peru, Argentina, Bolivia, Chile, Colombia, Ecuador, Panama, Paraguay, and Uruguay.
- December 20 – The Uskok War begins after the ports of the Holy Roman Empire on the Adriatic Sea are blockaded by the Republic of Venice, which has hired English and Dutch mercenaries.

=== Date unknown ===
- Easter – Persian Safavid hordes, led by Shah Abbas the Great, kill all the monks at the David Gareja monastery complex in Georgia, and set fire to its collection of manuscripts and works of art.
- Mary Talbot, Countess of Shrewsbury, is released from the Tower of London, in recognition of her role in helping to discover the murder of Sir Thomas Overbury.
- The Somers Isles Company is founded to administer Bermuda.
- John Browne is created the first King's Gunfounder in England.
- Austrian merchants receive economic privileges in the Ottoman Empire.
- The Perse School in Cambridge, England, is founded by Dr Stephen Perse.
- Wilson's School in Wallington, near London, is founded by Royal Charter.
- The Grolsch Brewery is founded in Groenlo, Netherlands.
- Konoike Shinroku opens an office in Osaka, and begins shipping tax-rice from western Japan to Osaka.
- Johannes Kepler publishes Dissertatio cum Nuncio Sidereo, in response to Galileo's discovery of Jupiter's moons.
- Manuel Dias, a Portuguese Jesuit missionary, introduces the telescope for the first time in China, in his book Tian Wen Lüe (Explicatio Sphaerae Coelestis).
- The second volume of Miguel de Cervantes's Don Quixote ("El ingenioso hidalgo Don Quijote de la Mancha") is published, and is as successful as the first. Don Quixote eventually becomes the only truly famous work its author ever writes.

== Births ==
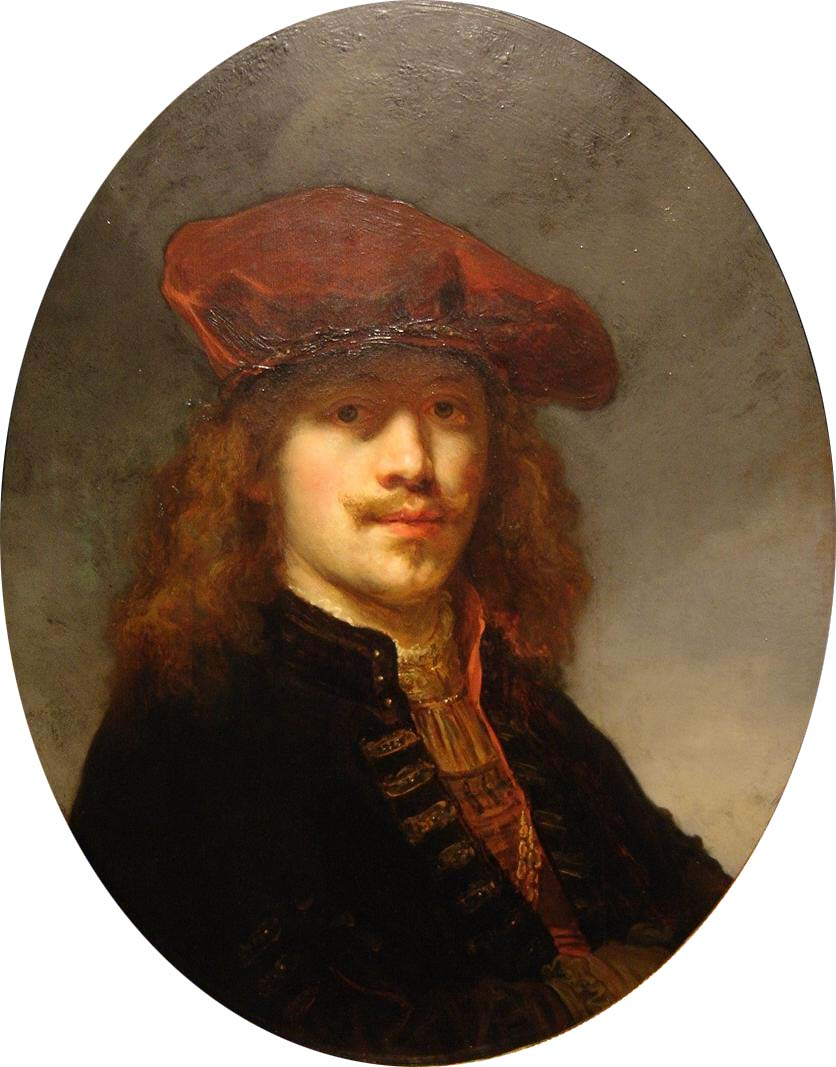
Govert Flinck

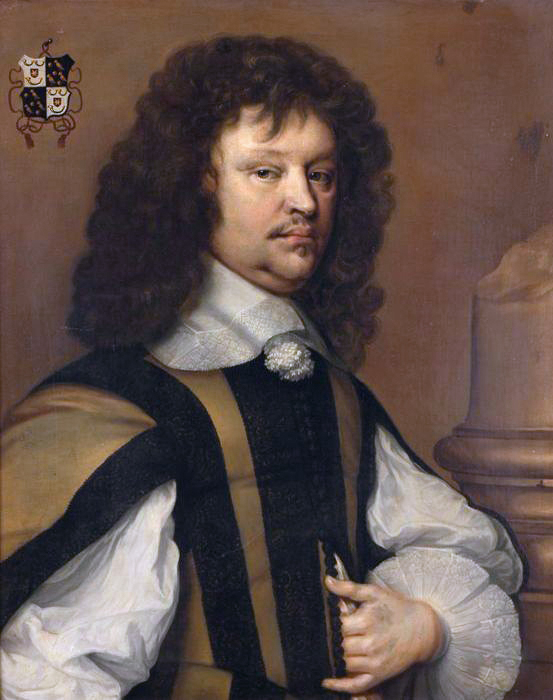
Pieter de Groot

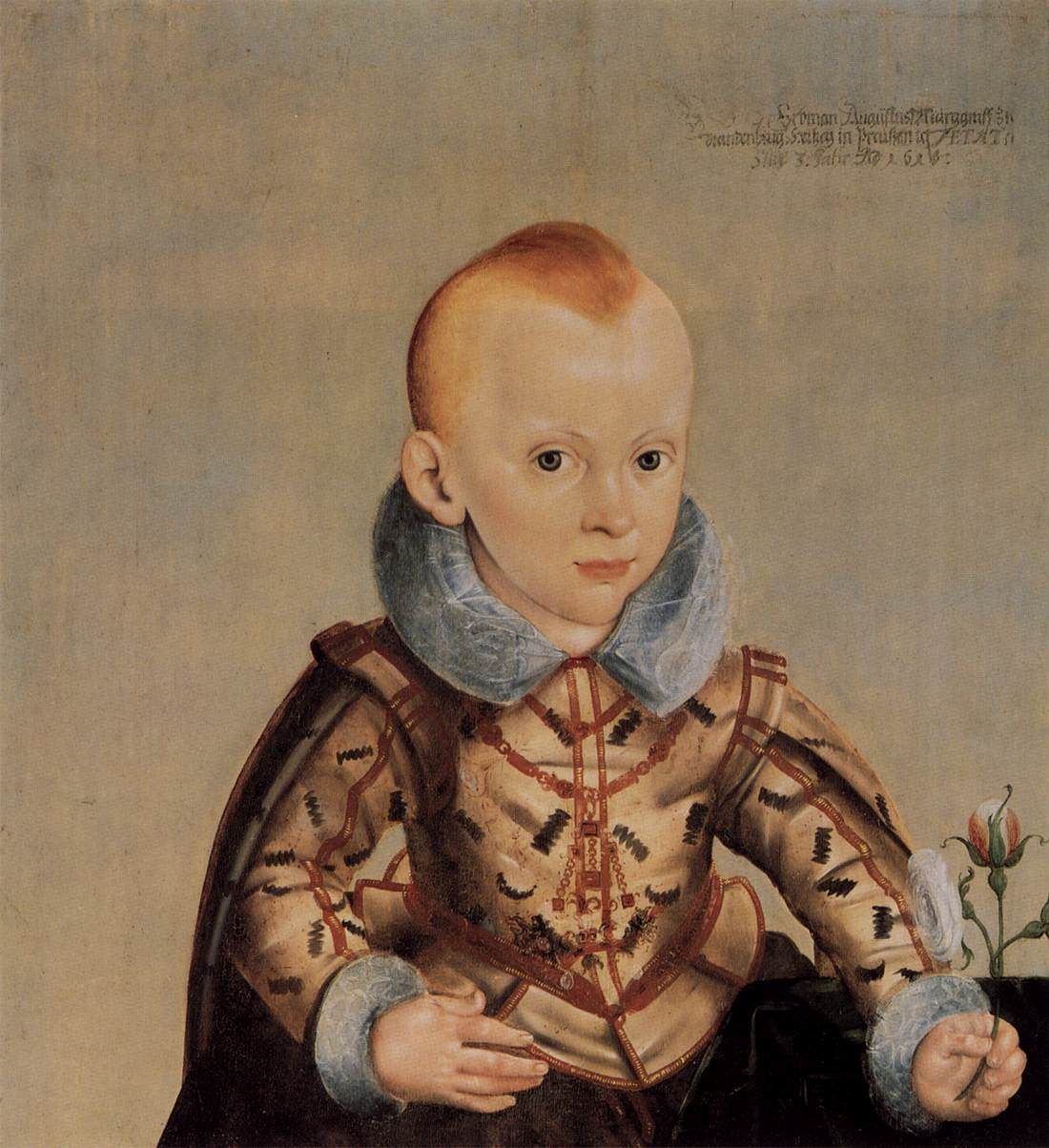
Erdmann August of Brandenburg-Bayreuth

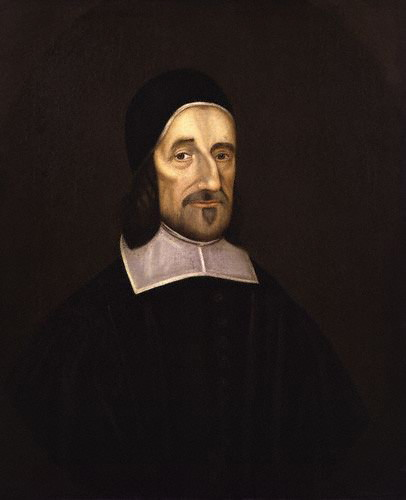
Richard Baxter

=== January–March ===
- January 6 – Richard Waldron, colonial settler, acting President of the Province of New Hampshire (d. 1689)
- January 10 – Sir John Robinson, 1st Baronet, of London, English politician (d. 1680)
- January 13 – Henrik Bjelke, Norwegian military officer (d. 1683)
- January 14 – John Biddle, English theologian (d. 1662)
- January 20 – Karmabai, Indian Jat known as Bhakt Shiromani Karmabai (d. 1634)
- January 25 – Govert Flinck, Dutch painter of the Dutch Golden Age (d. 1660)
- January 27 – Nicolas Fouquet, French Superintendent of Finances (d. 1680)
- January 30 – Thomas Rolfe, only child of Pocahontas and her English husband (d. 1675)
- February 18 – Maria Caterina Farnese, Duchess of Modena and Reggio (d. 1646)
- February 27 – Isaac Thornton, English politician (d. 1669)
- March 10 – Hans Ulrik Gyldenløve, illegitimate son of King Christian IV of Denmark and his mistress (d. 1645)
- March 11 – Johann Weikhard of Auersperg, Austrian prime minister (d. 1677)
- March 13 – Pope Innocent XII (d. 1700)
- March 17 – Gregorio Carafa, Grandmaster of the Order of Saint John (d. 1690)
- March 20 – Dara Shikoh, Indian prince (d. 1659)
- March 22 – Katherine Jones, Viscountess Ranelagh, English female scientist (d. 1691)
- March 28 – Pieter de Groot, Dutch diplomat (d. 1678)
- March 28 – Cosimo Ruggeri, Italian astrologer

=== April–June ===
- April 7 – Charles Cotterell, English courtier (d. 1701)
- April 9 – John Wright, British politician (d. 1683)
- April 16 – Edward Rawson, American settler (d. 1693)
- April 17 – Jacques Goulet, early pioneer in New France (now Québec) (d. 1688)
- April 24 – Klas Hansson Bjelkenstjerna, Swedish naval officer and civil servant (d. 1662)
- May 30 – Richard Neville, English soldier and MP (d. 1676)
- June 3 – Giles Strangways, English politician (d. 1675)
- June 15 – Samuel Sandys, English politician (d. 1685)
- June 20 (or July 31) – Salvator Rosa, Italian painter (d. 1673)

=== July–September ===
- July 1 – Samuel Hales, Connecticut settler and politician (d. 1693)
- July 9 – Sir Thomas Sclater, 1st Baronet, English politician (d. 1684)
- July 22 – Marguerite of Lorraine, princess of Lorraine, duchess of Orléans (d. 1672)
- July 28 – Charles de Noyelle, French Jesuit Superior General (d. 1686)
- August 13 – John Sherburne, American colonial (d. 1693)
- August 15 – Marie de Lorraine, Duchess of Guise (d. 1688)
- August 18 – John Sadler, British town clerk (d. 1674)
- September 3 – Mary Bradbury, accused Salem, Massachusetts witch (d. 1700)
- September 7 – John Birch, English politician (d. 1691)
- September 12
  - Landgravine Sophie of Hesse-Kassel, Countess of Schaumburg-Lippe (d. 1670)
  - William Turner, British politician (d. 1693)
- September 17 – Nicholas Pedley, English politician (d. 1685)
- September 20 – Giambattista Spinola, Italo-Spanish Roman Catholic cardinal (d. 1704)
- September 26 – Heinrich Bach, German organist and composer (d. 1692)

=== October–December ===
- October 1 – Hugh Bethell, English Member of Parliament and High Sheriff (d. 1679)
- October 8 – Erdmann August of Brandenburg-Bayreuth, Hereditary Margrave (d. 1651)
- October 23 – Ove Juul, Governor-General of Norway (d. 1686)
- October 27 – Christian I, Duke of Saxe-Merseburg, member of the House of Wettin (d. 1691)
- November 5 – Ibrahim, Ottoman Sultan (d. 1648)
- November 12 – Richard Baxter, English Puritan church leader (d. 1691)
- November 19 – Richard Norton of Southwick Park, English politician (d. 1691)
- November 20 – Francis Dane, American colonial priest (d. 1697)
- November 24 – Philip William, Elector Palatine (d. 1690)
- December 6 – Frederick Schomberg, 1st Duke of Schomberg (d. 1690)
- December 7 – Nicodemus Tessin the Elder, Swedish architect (d. 1681)
- December 9 – Anne Carr, Countess of Bedford, English noble (d. 1684)
- December 19 – Frederick, Duke of Württemberg-Neuenstadt, German duke (d. 1682)
- December 21 – Benedict Arnold, Rhode Island colonial governor (d. 1678)
- December 29 – Charles Scarborough, English physician, mathematician (d. 1694)
- Date unknown:
  - Osoet Pegua, Thai businesswoman (d. 1658)
  - Gironima Spana, Italian poisoner (d. 1659)
  - John Lacy, English actor and playwright (d. 1681)

== Deaths ==
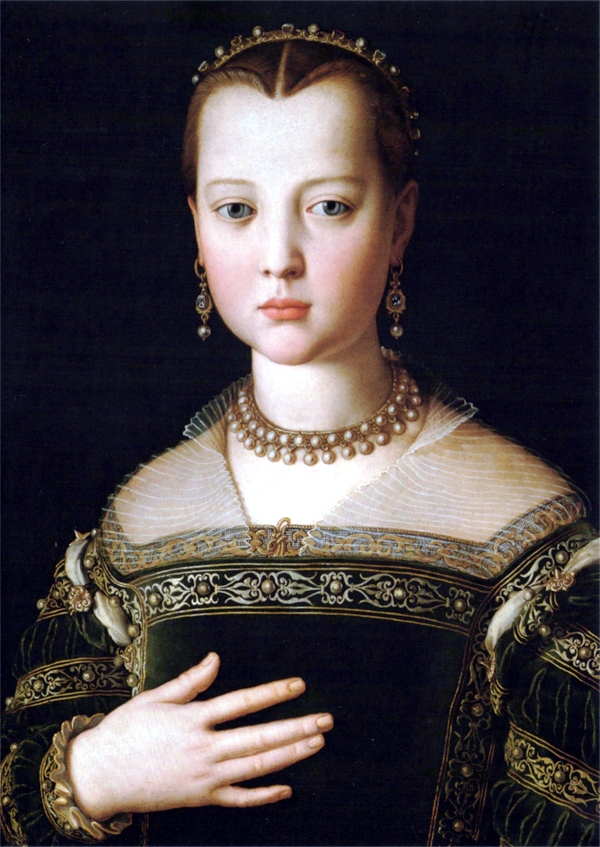
Virginia de' Medici

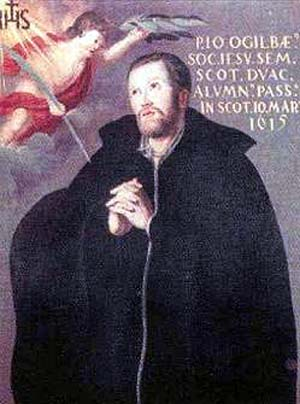
John Ogilvie

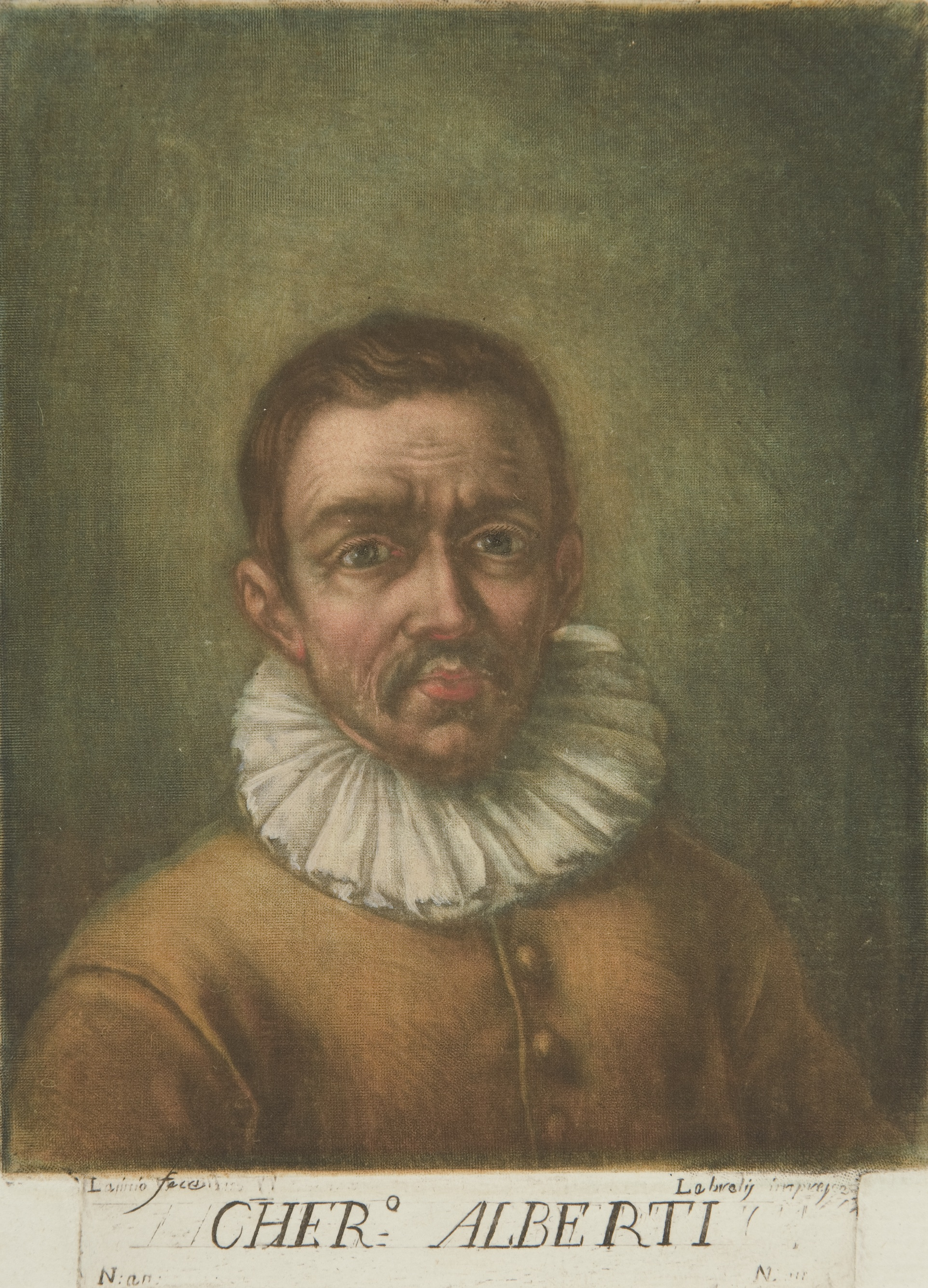
Cherubino Alberti

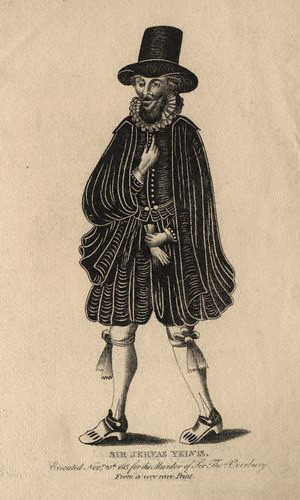
Gervase Helwys

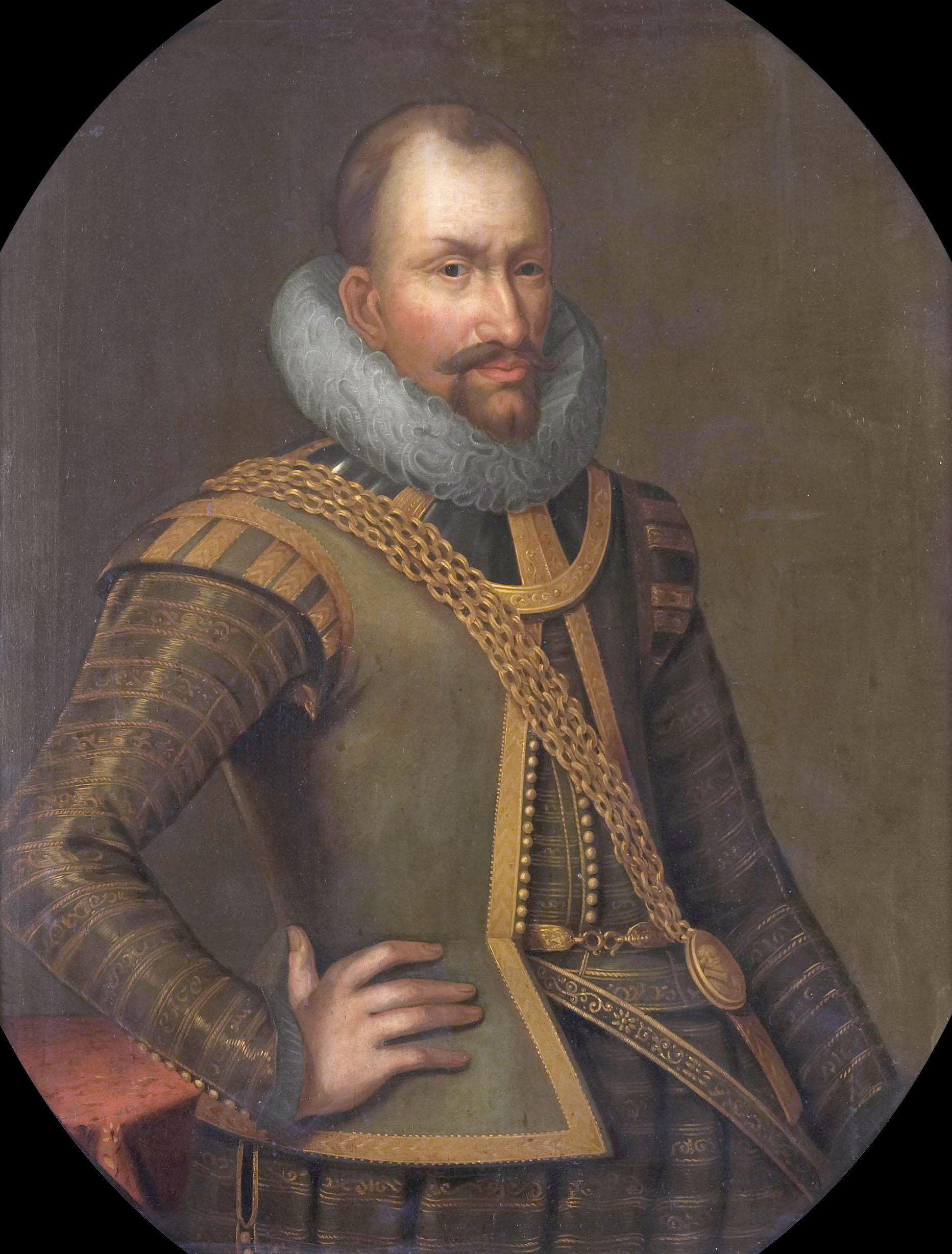
Gerard Reynst

=== January–March ===
- January 15 – Virginia de' Medici, Italian princess (b. 1568)
- January 16 – Roger Fenton, English clergyman (b. 1565)
- January 31 – Claudio Acquaviva, Italian Jesuit priest, elected (in 1581) the 5th Superior General of the Society of Jesus (b. 1543)
- February 4 – Giambattista della Porta, Italian scholar, polymath, playwright (b. 1535)
- February 3 or February 5 – Dom Justo Takayama, Japanese warlord (b. 1552)
- March 4 – Hans von Aachen, German painter (b. 1552)
- March 6 – Pieter Both, first Governor-General of the Dutch East Indies (b. 1568)
- March 10 – John Ogilvie, Scottish Catholic Jesuit martyr (b. 1579)
- March 19 – Henry Pierrepont, English politician (b. 1546)
- March 27 – Margaret of Valois, Queen of France (b. 1553)

=== April–June ===
- April 1 – Miklós Istvánffy, Hungarian politician (b. 1538)
- April 12 – William Lower, British astronomer (b. 1570)
- May 4 – Adriaan van Roomen, Flemish mathematician (b. 1561)
- May 5 – Juan Fernandez Pacheco, 5th Duke of Escalona, Spanish noble and diplomat (b. 1563)
- May 9 – John Perrin, English translator (b. 1558)
- May 15
  - Henry Bromley, English politician (b. 1560)
  - William Wilson, English priest (b. 1545)
- May 20 – Dirck van Os, Dutch merchant (b. 1556)
- June 2
  - Kuwana Yoshinari, Japanese samurai (b. 1551)
  - Kimura Shigenari, Japanese samurai (b. 1593)
- June 3
  - Hattori Masanari, Japanese samurai (b. 1565)
  - Sanada Yukimura, Japanese samurai (b. 1567)
- June 4 – Ujiie Yukihiro, Japanese samurai and feudal lord, from the Sengoku period to the beginning of Edo period (b. 1546)
- June 23
  - Roland Lytton, English politician (b. 1561)
  - Mashita Nagamori, minor Japanese daimyō (b. 1545)

=== July–September ===
- July 26 – Alonso Pérez de Guzmán, 7th Duke of Medina Sidonia (b. 1550)
- July 30 – Evert Horn, Swedish soldier (b. 1585)
- August 7 – Melchior Vulpius, German singer and composer (b. 1570)
- August 23 – Duke François de Joyeuse (b. 1562)
- September 1 – Étienne Pasquier, French lawyer and man of letters (b. 1529)
- September 9 – Virginio Orsini, Duke of Bracciano (b. 1572)
- September 11 – Vitus Miletus, German theologian (b. 1549)
- September 25 – Arbella Stuart, English noblewoman and woman of letters (b. 1575)

=== October–December ===
- October 9 – Hasan Kafi Pruščak, Bosnian scholar and judge (b. 1544)
- October 16
  - Françoise de Cezelli, French war hero (b. 1558)
  - Ferenc Forgách, Archbishop of Esztergom, Roman Catholic archbishop (b. 1560)
- October 18 – Cherubino Alberti, Italian engraver and painter (b. 1553)
- October 31 – Marcantonio Memmo, Doge of Venice (b. 1536)
- November 6 – Sir Richard Musgrave, 1st Baronet, English politician (b. 1585)
- November 14 – John Leveson, English politician (b. 1555)
- November 15 – Anne Turner, English murderer (b. 1576)
- November 20 – Gervase Helwys, English murderer (b. 1561)
- November 24 – Sethus Calvisius, German calendar reformer (b. 1556)
- November 28 – William Howard, 3rd Baron Howard of Effingham, English politician and Baron (b. 1577)
- November 29 – George Albert II, Margrave of Brandenburg (b. 1591)
- November – Edward Wright, English mathematician and cartographer (b. 1561)
- December 7 – Gerard Reynst, Dutch merchant (b. c. 1558)
- December 26 – August of Saxony, German prince (b. 1589)
