= Kajali =

Kajali may refer to:

- Kajali language, an Iranian language
- Kajali, Palghar, a village in India
