= Yoshinari =

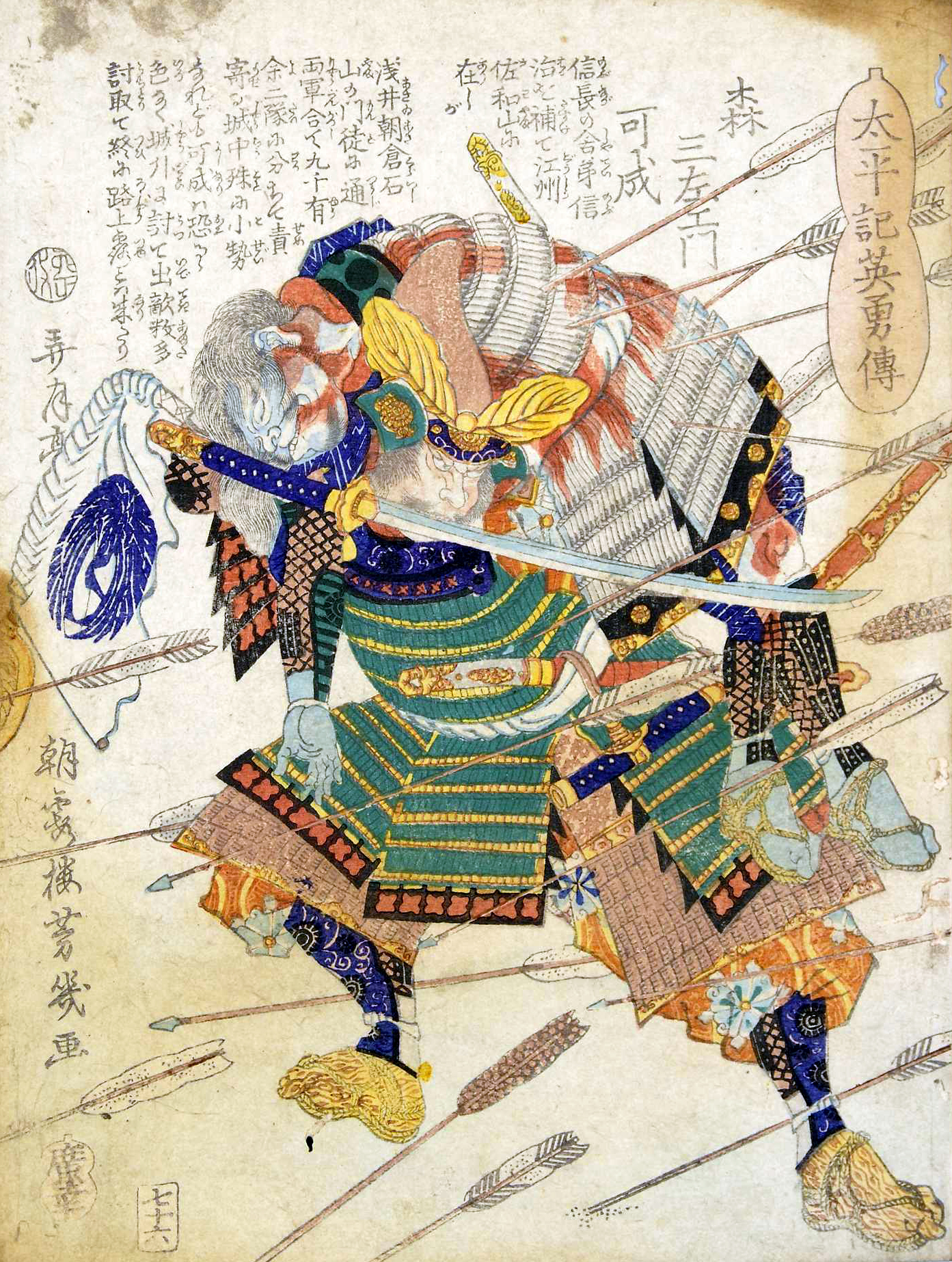
- Yoshinari Mori (1523–1570), Japanese samurai
- Pronunciation: joɕinaɾi (IPA)
- Gender: Male

Origin
- Origin: Japanese
- Meaning: depends on the kanji used.

Other names
- Alternative spelling: Yosinari (Kunrei-shiki) Yosinari (Nihon-shiki) Yoshinari (Hepburn)

Yoshinari is both a masculine Japanese given name and a Japanese surname.

== Written forms ==
Yoshinari can be written using many different combinations of kanji characters. Here are some examples:

- 義也, "justice, to be"
- 義成, "justice, turn into"
- 佳也, "skilled, to be"
- 佳成, "skilled, turn into"
- 善也, "virtuous, to be"
- 善成, "virtuous, turn into"
- 吉也, "good luck, to be"
- 吉成, "good luck, turn into"
- 良也, "good, to be"
- 良成, "good, turn into"
- 恭也, "respectful, to be"
- 嘉也, "excellent, to be"
- 嘉成, "excellent, turn into"
- 能成, "capacity, turn into"
- 喜成, "rejoice, turn into"

The name can also be written in hiragana よしなり or katakana ヨシナリ.

== Notable people with the given name Yoshinari ==
- Yoshinari Minamoto (源 義成, 1200–1219), the second son of the second Kamakura shōgun of Japan, Minamoto no Yoriie
- Yoshinari Hatakeyama (畠山 義就, 1437?–1491), Japanese samurai and feudal lord (daimyō) of the Muromachi period (early 15th century)
- Yoshinari Mori (森 可成, 1523–1570), Japanese samurai of the Sengoku period and the head of the Mori family, who served the Saitō clan
- Yoshinari Kuwana (桑名 吉成, 1551–1615), senior retainer under the Chōsokabe clan during the latter years of the Sengoku period of Feudal Japan
- Yoshinari Yamazaki (山崎 美成; 1796–1856), Japanese essayist and antiquarian
- Yoshinari Kida (気田 義也; born 1943), Japanese alpine skier
- Yoshinari Ogawa (小川 良成; born 1966), Japanese professional wrestler who currently works for Pro Wrestling Noah
- Yoshinari Takagi (高木 義成; born 1979), former Japanese football player

== Notable people with the surname Yoshinari ==
- David Soria Yoshinari (吉成 大; born 1977), Japanese-Peruvian football player who currently plays for C.D. Universidad César Vallejo
- Yoh Yoshinari (吉成 曜; born 1971), Japanese key animator, storyboard artist, and anime director

== See also ==
- Yoshinari Station, train station in Tokushima, Tokushima Prefecture, Japan
