= Arica earthquake =

Arica earthquake may refer to:

- 1604 Arica earthquake
- 1615 Arica earthquake
- 1868 Arica earthquake
