= Wealden iron industry =

Former industry in south-east England

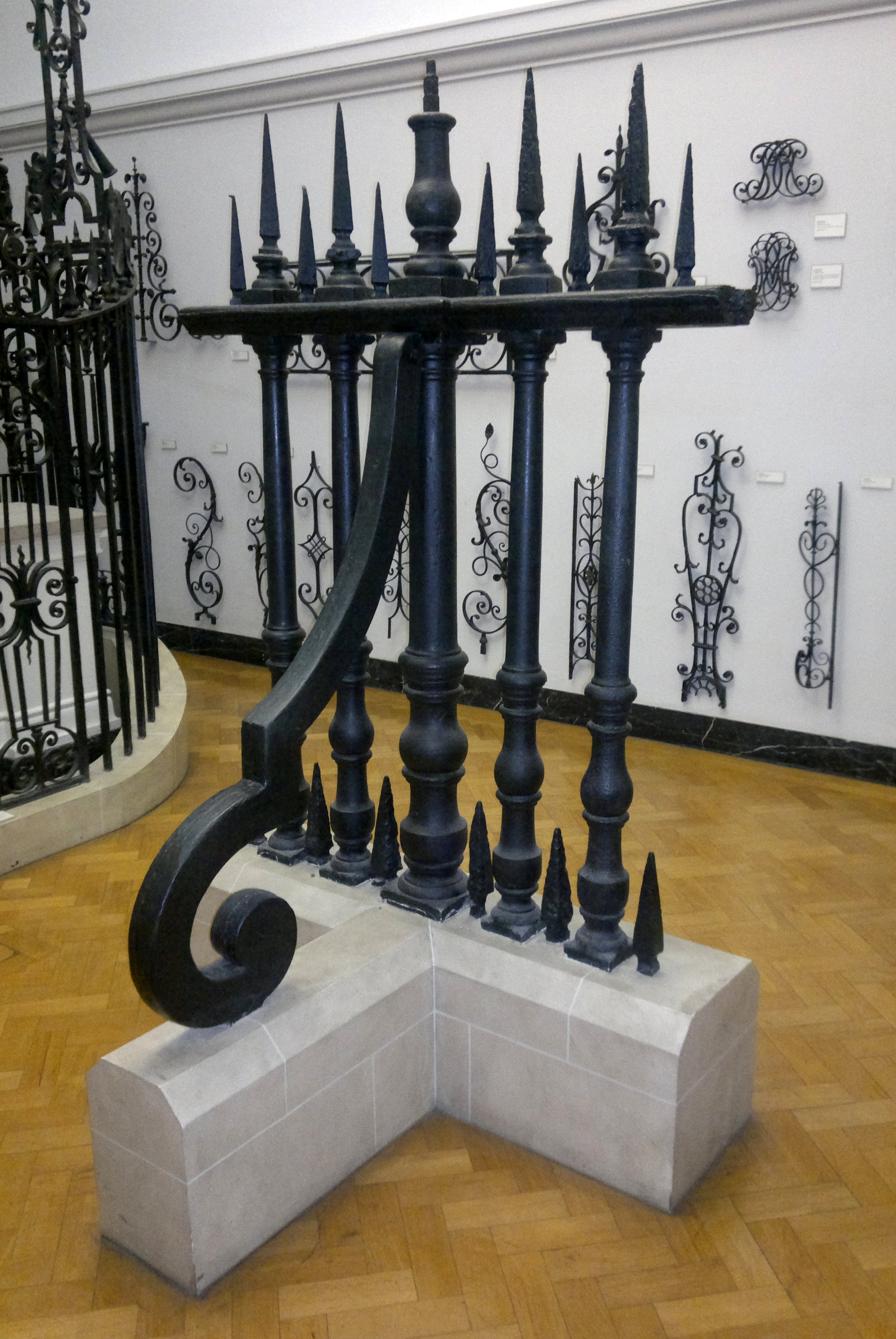
Cast iron railings for St. Paul's Cathedral, now in the Victoria & Albert Museum.

The Wealden iron industry was located in the Weald of south-eastern England. It was formerly an important industry, producing a large proportion of the bar iron made in England in the 16th century and most British cannon until about 1770. Ironmaking in the Weald used ironstone from various clay beds, and was fuelled by charcoal made from trees in the heavily wooded landscape. The industry in the Weald declined when ironmaking began to be fuelled by coke made from coal, which does not occur accessibly in the area.

== Resources ==
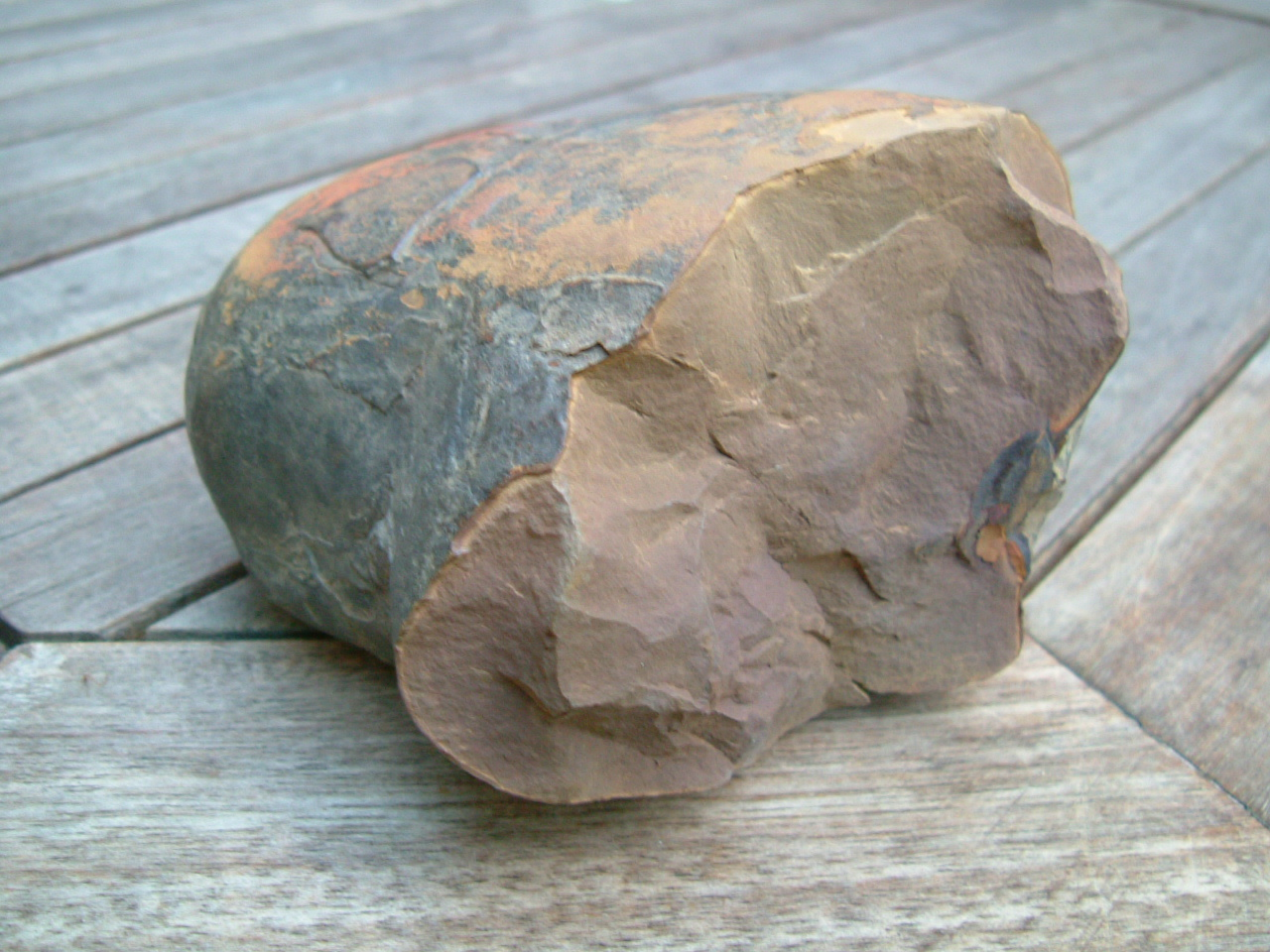

Iron ore in the form of siderite, commonly known as iron stone or historically as mine, occurs in patches or bands in the Cretaceous clays of the Weald. Differing qualities of ore were extracted and mixed by experienced smelters to give the best results. Sites of opencast quarries survive from the pre-Roman and Roman eras, but medieval ore extraction was mainly done by digging a series of minepits about five metres in diameter and up to twelve metres deep with material being winched up in baskets suspended from a wooden tripod. This was less destructive of the land as spoil from one pit was used to backfill the previous pit allowing continued land use.

The fuel for smelting was charcoal, which needed to be produced as close as possible to the smelting sites because it would crumble to dust if transported far by cart over rough tracks. Wood was also needed for pre-roasting the ore on open fires, a process which broke down the lumps or nodules and converted the carbonate into oxide. Large areas of woodland were available in the Weald and coppicing woodlands could provide a sustainable source of wood. Sustainable charcoal production for a post-medieval blast furnace required the timber production from a 3-mile (4.8 km) radius of a furnace in a landscape that was a quarter to a third wooded. Forging and finishing of the iron from bloomeries and blast furnaces also required large quantities of charcoal and was usually carried out at a separate site.

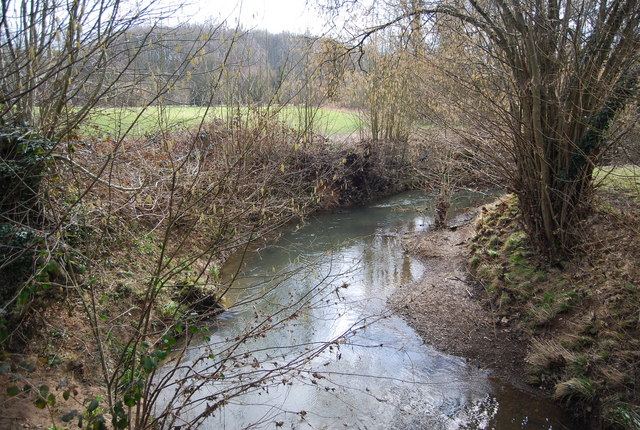
River Teise near Furnace Mill.

Water power became important with the introduction of blast furnaces and finery forges in the late medieval period. Blast furnaces needed to operate continuously for as long as possible and a series of ponds were often created in a valley to give a sustainable flow for the waterwheel. A campaign, as the production run was known, usually ran from October through to late spring when streams began to dry up, although Lamberhurst Furnace driven by the River Teise ran continuously for more than three years in the 1740s. Finery forges with three or four waterwheels to drive bellows and hammers needed more water than a furnace at times, although continuity was not as important. They tended to be sited downstream from a furnace if they were in the same valley. Ponds were created by building a dam known as a pond bay, which often served as a road, across one of the many valleys in the undulating Wealden landscape. In 1754 one furnace was so drought-stricken that its manager considered hiring workmen to turn the wheel as a treadmill. This need for continuous water power was an incentive in the development of the water-returning engine, a waterwheel driven by water raised by a steam engine pump.

== Prehistoric ironmaking ==
So far only about two dozen sites have been identified where iron was made before the Roman invasion, mostly scattered across East Sussex and the Vale of Kent. A large site at Broadfield, Crawley is the westernmost place where smelting has been ascertained, although there is a possible site associated with an Iron Age enclosure at Piper's Copse near Northchapel in the western Weald. Continuity of pottery styles from the Iron Age into the early Roman period makes precise dating of many sites to before or after the Roman conquest difficult. Carbon dating has identified a site at Cullinghurst Wood, Hartfield to between 350 and 750 BC.

During his invasions of Britain in 55 and 54 BC Julius Caesar noted iron production near the coast, possibly at known sites at Sedlescombe and Crowhurst Park near Hastings.

== Roman ironmaking ==
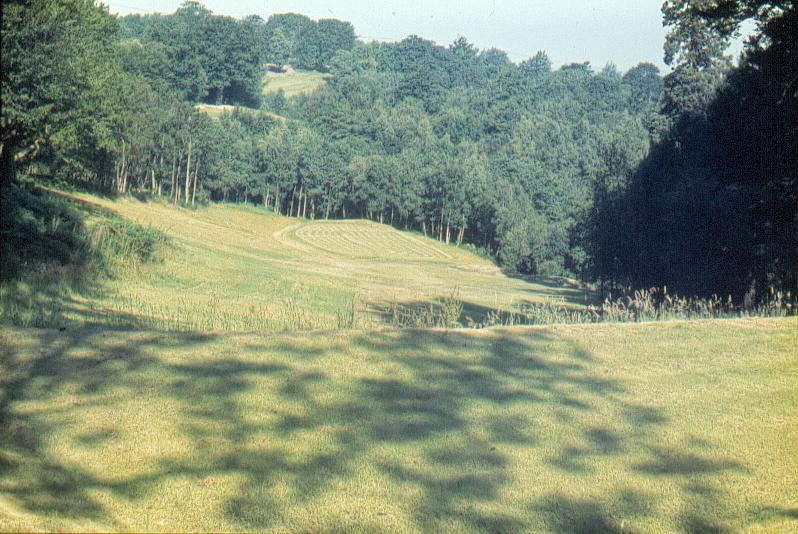
View of the 13th fairway of Beauport Park golf course, beneath which are remains of the Roman ironworks.

Beauport Park, where evidence has been found of probably the third largest iron works in the whole Roman Empire. The Romans made full use of the brown- and ochre-coloured stone in the Weald, and many of their roads there are the means of transport for the ore, and were extensively metalled with slag from iron smelting. The sites of about 113 bloomeries have been identified as Roman, mainly in East Sussex. The Weald was in this period one of the most important iron-producing regions in Roman Britain. Excavations at a few sites have produced tiles of the Classis Britannica, suggesting that they were actually run by, or were supplying iron to this Roman fleet. Total iron production has been estimated at 750 tons per year, but under 200 tons per year after 250 AD.

== Medieval ==
The invasion and settlement of the Weald by Anglo-Saxons seems to have brought a complete end to the Romano-British iron industry. No evidence of iron smelting has been found after the end of Roman rule until the ninth century when a primitive bloomery was built at Millbrook on Ashdown Forest, with a small hearth for reheating the blooms nearby. The date of this site has been established by radiocarbon and archaeomagnetic methods. The technology used there was similar to a slightly earlier furnace excavated in the eastern Netherlands, indicating that knowledge of Romano-British methods had been completely lost and replaced by the Saxons' own method. Evidence of forging of iron blooms in settlements close to the South Downs does indicate that smelting may have been going on at other undiscovered sites. It was usual for settlements concentrated along the Downs to have outlying parcels of land in the Weald for summer grazing. It is likely that smelting was carried out during the summer and the iron blooms taken back to the main settlement to work on in the winter.

In all some 30 unpowered medieval bloomery sites are known in the Weald, but most of these remain undated. Accounts survive of the operation of just one, at Tudeley near Tonbridge in the mid-14th century.

== Powered bloomeries ==
From about the 14th century, water-power began to be applied to bloomeries, but fewer than ten such sites are suspected.

== The introduction of the blast furnace ==
A new ironmaking process was devised in the Namur region of what is now Belgium in the 15th century. This spread to the pays de Bray on the eastern boundary of Normandy and then to the Weald. The new smelting process involved a blast furnace and finery forge. It was introduced in about 1490 at Queenstock in Buxted parish. The number of ironworks increased greatly from about 1540.

== The mature industry ==
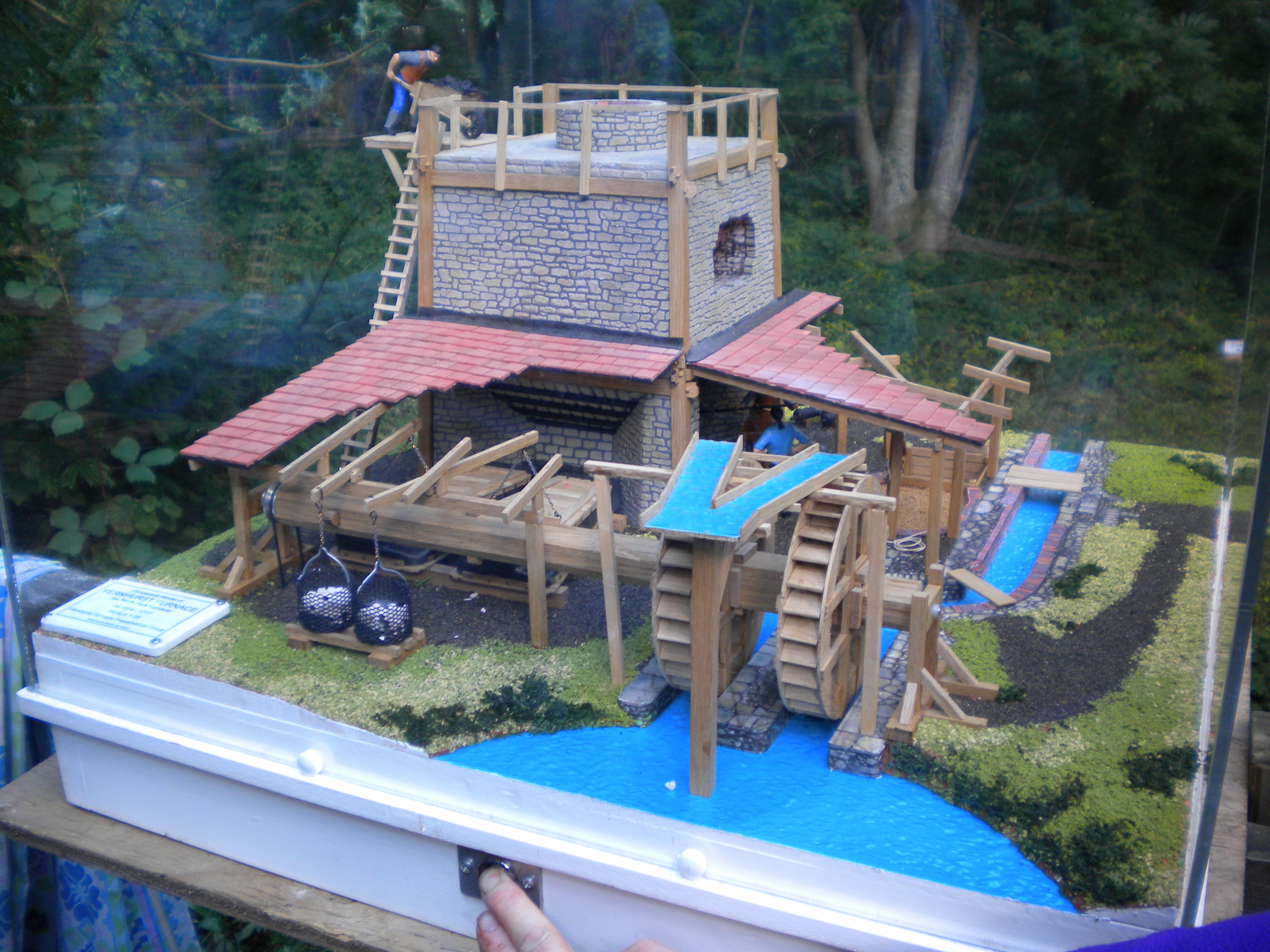
A moving model of a Wealden blast furnace based on Fernhurst furnace.

Nearly 180 sites in all were used for this process, having a furnace, a forge or both between the 15th century and 18th century. Waterpower was the means of operating the bellows in the blast furnaces and for operating bellows and helve hammers in finery forges. Scattered through the Weald are ponds still to be found called ’Furnace Pond’ or ’Hammer Pond’. The iron was used for making household utensils, nails and hinges; and for casting cannon. The first blast furnace was recorded at Buxted in 1490.

The industry was at its peak towards the end of Queen Elizabeth I's reign. Most works were small, but at Brenchley one ironmaster employed 200 men. Most of them would have been engaged in mining ore and cutting wood (for charcoal), as the actual ironworks only required a small workforce. The wars fought during the reign of Henry VIII increased the need for armaments, and the Weald became the centre of an armaments industry. Cast-iron cannon were made in the Weald from 1543 when Buxted's Ralf Hogge cast the first iron cannon for his unlikely employer: a Sussex vicar who was gunstonemaker to the king.

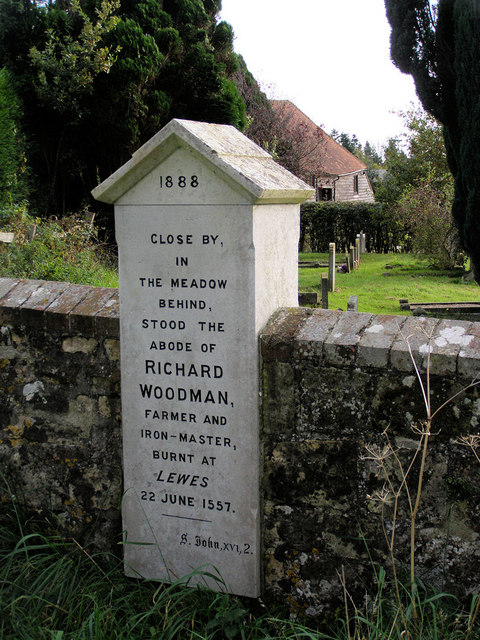
Richard Woodman was an ironmaster from Warbleton who was one of the 17 Lewes Martyrs burned during the Marian persecutions of Protestants during the 1550s.

In the 16th century and the early 17th century, the Weald was a major source of iron for manufacture in London, peaking at over 9000 tons per year in the 1590s. However, after 1650, Wealden production became increasingly focused on the production of cannon; and bar iron was only produced for local consumption. This decline may have begun as early as the 1610s, when Midland ironware began to be sold in London. Certainly after Swedish iron began to be imported in large quantities after the Restoration, Wealden bar iron seems to have been unable to compete in the London market.

Cannon production was a major activity in the Weald until the end of the Seven Years' War, but a cut in the price paid by the Board of Ordnance drove several Wealden ironmasters into bankruptcy. They were unable to match the much lower price that was acceptable to the Scottish Carron Company, whose fuel was coke. A few ironworks continued operating on a very small scale. With no local source of mineral coal, the Wealden iron industry was unable to compete with the new coke-fired ironworks of the Industrial Revolution. The last to close was the forge at Ashburnham. Little survives of the furnace and forge buildings, although there are still scores of the industry's hammer and furnace ponds scattered throughout the Weald.

Steel production was never widespread in the Weald, with most high quality steel being imported from Spain, the Middle East, or Germany. A steel forge was built upstream from Newbridge Furnace on Ashdown Forest around 1505 but had ceased production by 1539. The Sydney family, with mills at Robertsbridge forge and at Sandhurst in Kent, produced steel using skilled German workers, but faced strong competition from German suppliers. In the 17th century a steel forge existed at Warbleton in Sussex.

== St Paul's Cathedral ==
The Lamberhurst Foundry is believed to have been the maker in 1710–14 of some of the earliest cast-iron railings produced in England, which they made for St Paul's Cathedral, despite the objections of Christopher Wren, who did not want a fence around the Cathedral at all, and said that if there had to be one it should be of wrought rather than cast iron. The railings surrounded the cathedral, including seven gates. It weighed two hundred tons and cost six pence a pound. The total cost was £11,202. No further railings are known to have been cast in the Weald. Other early uses of cast iron railings were at Cambridge Senate House and at St Martin-in-the-Fields, London.

== See also ==
- Medway watermills
- Medway watermills (upper tributaries)
- Medway watermills (middle tributaries)
