= Medway watermills (upper tributaries) =

Mills on the River Medway, Kent, England

The Medway and its tributaries and sub-tributaries have been used for over 1,150 years as a source of power. There are over two hundred sites where the use of water power is known. These uses included corn milling, fulling, paper making, iron smelting, pumping water, making gunpowder, vegetable oil extraction, and electricity generation. Today, there is just one watermill working for trade. Those that remain have mostly been converted. Such conversions include a garage, dwellings, restaurants, museums and a wedding venue. Some watermills are mere derelict shells, lower walls or lesser remains. Of the majority, there is nothing to be seen. A large number of tributaries feed into the River Medway. The tributaries that powered watermills will be described in the order that they feed in. The mills are described in order from source to mouth. Left bank and right bank are referred to as though the reader is facing downstream. This article covers the tributaries that feed in above Penshurst.

== West Hoathly Stream ==
A stream rises at West Hoathly and enters from the right bank shortly before Mill Place Mill.

=== Gravetye Foundry ===
A gun foundry stood at Gravetye. The pond remains.

== East Grinstead Stream ==
A stream flows through East Grinstead, and enters from the left bank shortly before Brambletye Mill.

=== Brook Mill ===
This was the manorial mill to Imberhorne Manor.

=== Dunnings Mill ===
TQ 391 368 51°06′49″N 0°00′43″W

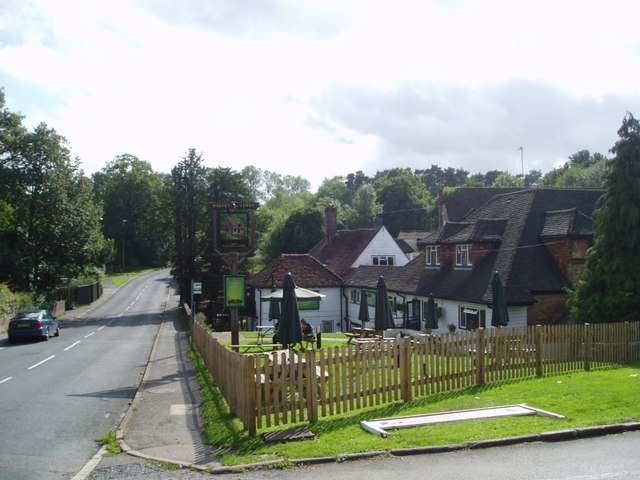
The Old Mill PH

Dunnings Mill was a corn mill, records date back to 1713, but the site could be earlier. The mill was demolished in the early years of the twentieth century, and the site was marked in 1932 by the sluice gate. A pub stands on the site, with a modern waterwheel.^{[Note 1]}

== Hartfield Stream ==
A stream flows through Hartfield, entering the Medway from the left bank downstream of the B2026 bridge. It powered four watermills.

=== Bower Forge ===
TQ 441 384 51°07′36″N 0°03′37″E This forge may have been in existence in 1558, when Hugh Bottinge left "two tons of yron" in his will. It was working in 1653 but ruined by 1664. The dam has been recorded as 200 metres (220 yd) long. The mansion of Hammerwood takes its name from this forge.

=== Cansiron Furnace, Hartfield ===
TQ 453 383 51°07′32″N 0°04′38″E This was a furnace and forge mentioned in 1563. It was in operation from 1574 to 1700. Michael Weston was the ironmaster in 1574 and in 1578 it passed to William Bowyer. Richard Stretfield was the ironmaster here in the late 16th century, later running Pilbeames forge. Sackville Turner acquired the furnace in 1613, and it was sold to the Courthopes in 1617. In 1639 it was acquired by Richard Tichborne and John Maynard. Although it was working in 1653, it was ruined by 1664 but appears to have been put back to work, being mentioned in 1700.^{[Note 1]}

=== Averies Mill ===
This mill was mentioned in 1598, it may have been a furnace.

=== Bolebroke (Bolebrook) Mill, Hartfield ===
TQ 481 373 51°06′57″N 0°07′01″E A Domesday site. A mill was mentioned here in 1598. The surviving mill building dates to 1740. The mill was a corn mill with an overshot waterwheel of 11 feet (3.35 m) diameter and 5 feet 6 inches (1.68 m) wide. The Atherfold family were the millers from 1602 to the mid-1880s, although John Burfoot was recorded here in 1867. Alfred Tester was the miller in 1899, followed by the Barker family who ran the mill until 1948. The waterwheel was dismantled in 1977 following storm damage, but much internal machinery survives. The mill is now a small hotel, and was featured in the 1995 film Carrington starring Emma Thompson and Jonathan Pryce.^{[Note 1]}

== Warren Brook ==
The Warren Brook rises below Crowborough Beacon and enters the Medway from the right bank downstream of the Hartfield Stream. It powered six watermills.

=== Old Furnace / Old Mill, Crowborough ===
This furnace was mentioned in a survey of 1658 and marked on Kelton's map of 1747. Old mill was damaged by a fire in the early twentieth century.^{[Note 1]}

=== New Mill, Crowborough ===
New mill was a corn mill.^{[Note 1]}

=== Crowborough Furnace / Woodeaves Mill, Crowborough. ===
TQ 498 326 51°04′23″N 0°08′21″E Crowborough furnace was recorded as being in existence in 1593. The dam is recorded as 120 metres (130 yd) long and up to 3 metres (9 ft 10 in) high. Woodeaves Mill was a corn mill, standing of the site of an old furnace.

=== Withyham (Mousehall, Mousehold) Mill ===
TQ 496 356 51°06′00″N 0°08′15″E This was a corn mill. John Pulman was the miller in 1574 and 1595, it was recorded as Mousehold Mill in 1598. John Camfield was the tenant miller in 1782, followed by Peter Everest in 1788. J. M. W. Turner sketched the mill c.1795. Mrs Everest was the tenant in 1798. Alfred Hall and Thomas Caffyn are recorded in 1838. Thomas Caffyn was the miller in 1843, later taking Ashurst mill. Alfred Hall was the miller sometime before 1882.^{[Note 1]}

=== Water-powered pump, Withyham ===
TQ 496 356 51°06′00″N 0°08′15″E A water-powered pump was erected c.1900 on the site of Withyham mill. It had an 8 feet (2.44 m) diameter waterwheel driving a three-throw pump. The derelict pump house survives.

=== Buckhurst Park Mill, Withyham ===
A furze mill was recorded at Buckhurst Park in 1693.

== Mill Brook or Steel River (Warren Brook tributary). ==
The Mill Brook rises in Ashdown Forest, entering the Warren Brook from the left bank downstream of Woodeaves Mill, shortly before the Warren Brook enters the Medway. It powered seven watermills.

=== Nutley Watermill ===
A mill was recorded in Nutley in 1564.

=== Steel Forge, Hartfield. ===
TQ 450 316 approx. 51°03′55″N 0°04′13″E This was an ironworks, built c.1505. It was worked by John Glande in 1523 and mentioned in the will of Roger Machyn which was proved in 1524, but stopped by 1539 although it was later put to work again, being granted to Thomas Gaveller and Francis Challenor in 1549, and John Gage in 1554.

=== Pippingford (New) Furnace, Hartfield ===
TQ 450 316 approx. 51°03′55″N 0°04′13″E Pippingford Furnace was the second blast furnace built, it was located very close to the site of Steel Forge. The mill dam is recorded as 125 metres (137 yd) long and 3.5 metres (11 ft) high. The furnace was built sometime between 1693 and 1696, and leased to Charles Manning of Dartford in 1717. It was marked as "New Furnace" on Budgen's map of 1724. A cannon was excavated here in 1970.

=== Newbridge Furnace ===
TQ 456 325 51°04′24″N 0°04′45″E The first blast furnace built, at work in 1497, when the ironmaster was Simon Ballard. The furnace was leased to Thomas Boleyn in 1525. It was last known to be working in 1574, and the last reference occurs in 1603. The dam is recorded at 180 metres (200 yd) long and up to 3 metres (9 ft 10 in) high.

=== Newbridge Mill, Coleman's Hatch ===
TQ 456 328 51°04′33″N 0°04′46″E In 1598, Thomas Tailor held Newbridge Mill, recorded as having two watermills under one roof at £6 annual rental. In 1658, Richard, Earl of Dorset held a watermill at Newbridge. The surviving 1830 built mill is now a dwelling, retaining its overshot waterwheel. In 1867 it is recorded that Mrs Mary Fillcry (deceased) had been the miller. The cast iron waterwheel is 10 feet (3.05 m) diameter and 6 feet (1.83 m) wide carried on a 9 inches (230 mm) diameter cast iron axle.^{[Note 1]}^{,}^{[Note 2]}

=== Cotchford Forge, Withyham ===
TQ 471 338 51°05′04″N 0°06′04″E This forge was recorded in 1579. It was owned by Sir John Shurley in 1627, and mentioned in a Parliamentary survey of 1656. The dam is recorded as 55 metres (60 yd) long and 1.8 metres (5 ft 11 in) high.

=== Cotchford Mill, Withyham ===
Cotchford Mill was shown on a survey of 1598, and on a map drawn by John Bowra in 1774.

== Waterdown Forest Stream ==
A stream rises near Jarvis Brook, and enters the Medway on its right bank below the Warren Brook. It powered three watermills, and a number of tributaries also powered watermills.

=== Cowford Furnace ===
TQ 559 320 51°03′58″N 0°13′33″E This furnace was built in 1562, when the builders were in dispute with Lord Abergavenny. It appears to have ceased working by 1574. The dam is recorded as 70 metres (77 yd) long and up to 3 metres (9 ft 10 in) high.

=== Redgate Mill, Rotherfield ===
TQ 552 324 51°04′11″N 0°12′58″E Redgate Mill was a corn mill, on the site of an earlier furnace.

=== Birchden Forge, Rotherfield ===
TQ 533 353 51°05′47″N 0°11′25″E Birchden Forge had a large pond, fed by two streams. It was mentioned in the will of Roger Machyn, proved in 1524. In 1574 it was sold to Sir Walter Waller, passing to Michael Weston in 1579. In 1595 the Earl of Dorset bought the forge, his tenant being Thomas Richardson. It was recorded on a map of 1598. The forge was sold to John Baker in 1617, with tenant Richard Maynard, who left his half share in Birchden and Hamsell furnaces to his son-in-law in 1619. The forge was operating in 1653 and 1667. John Browne built a boring mill in 1677. The forge was mentioned if reference to the sale of two iron mills at Birchden in 1709 and 1719. The forge remained in the Baker family until 1737. The dam has been recorded at 155 metres (170 yd) long and 2 metres (6 ft 7 in)high.

== The Jarvis Brook ==
A stream rises near Rotherfield, entering the Waterdown Forest Stream on the left bank just below Redgate Mill, it powered a furnace.

=== Maynards Gate Forge ===
TQ 540 298 51°02′48″N 0°11′53″E This forge shared the same pond as the Furnace. The dam has been recorded as 70 metres (77 yd) long and 3.75 metres (12 ft 4 in) high.

=== Maynards Gate Furnace ===
TQ 539 298 51°02′49″N 0°11′47″E An iron furnace, possibly also known as Knights Place. This furnace was probably in operation in 1562. Anthony Fowle being the operator. In 1574 it was owned by Lord Buckhurst and operated by Arthur Middleton. in 1674 Anthony Fowle of Newick left the furnace to his son Richard. It was working in 1653 but ruined by 1664.

== Eridge Stream ==
A stream rises in Eridge, it flows into the Waterdown Forest stream on the right bank below Redgate Mill.

=== Eridge Furnace ===
TQ 564 350 51°05′34″N 0°14′04″E A large pond in Eridge Park marks the site of Eridge Furnace. It was owned by Lord Abergavenny in 1574, but may have been in existence in 1538. The furnace was working in 1603. The dam has been recorded as 210 metres (230 yd) long and 7.5 metres (24 ft 7 in) high.

=== Eridge Forge ===
TQ 560 350 51°05′35″N 0°13′43″E This forge was below Eridge Furnace. It was recorded in 1574 as being owned by Lord Abergavenny, and may have been in existence in 1636. In 1717 the output of the forge was 30 tons of iron. It was recorded on Bugden's map of 1724. The dam has been recorded as 145 metres (159 yd) long and 2.4 metres (7 ft 10 in) high.

== Hamsell Stream ==
A stream enters the Waterdown Forest Stream on the left bank below the Eridge stream. It powered a watermill.

=== Hamsell Forge ===
This was an iron furnace, located close to Eridge station. The pond still holds water. The forge was mentioned in a will of 1619 and with reference to a sale in 1709 or 1719.

== Motts Mill Stream ==
A stream rises near Withyham. It powered a watermill.

=== Motts (Shurlocks, Moat) Mill, Withyham. ===
TQ 523 353 51°05′48″N 0°10′34″E Motts Mill was recorded on a map of 1597 as Shurlock's Water Mill and as Motts Mill on a map of 1598. It was recorded on a 1797 1" to 1-mile (1.6 km) map of Sussex by William Gardner and Thomas Gream as at Moat Mill Common. The area is recorded as Motts Mill in the 1838 census.

== Groombridge Stream ==
A stream rises south of Tunbridge Wells and flows in a westerly direction, entering the Medway from the right bank downstream of the Waterdown Forest Brook. It powered two watermills.

=== Hungershall Forge ===
TQ 557 382 51°07′19″N 0°13′33″E This forge was recorded as "Hughes Hale", it was owned by Lord Abergavenny in 1568, when it was leased for six years to James Ellis of Penshurst. The dam has been recorded at 80 metres (87 yd) long and up to 2.5 metres (8 ft 2 in) high.

=== Groombridge Mill ===
TQ 531 376 51°07′02″N 0°11′18″E Groombridge Mill was working until c.1934, fed by the lake of Groombridge Place. The waterwheel was overshot, carried on a wooden axle 15 inches (380 mm) square. This carries a cast iron pit wheel with 72 cogs, which drove the cast iron wallower with 30 teeth, carried on a wooden upright shaft. The great spur wheel is all wood, and has 84 cogs, driving three pairs of millstones. A wooden clasp arm crown wheel with 70 cogs drove two layshafts. The millstones were one pair of 46 inches (1.17 m) diameter French Burrs, one pair of 46 inches (1.17 m) Peaks and one pair of 34 inches (0.86 m) diameter Peaks.^{[Note 1]}^{,}^{[Note 2]}

== Kent Water ==
A stream rises above Cowden, and enters the Medway on its left bank below Ashurst Mill, it powered eight watermills.

=== Scarletts (Scalehurst) Furnace, Cowden. ===
Scarletts Furnace was founded in 1547. It was known as Scalehurst in the fifteenth century, and at the end of the sixteenth century was being worked by one Quintyn. It came into the possession of John Knight of Lingfield. Scarletts Furnace was badly damaged in a storm in 1703 and had ceased working by 1717. The last reference to it being in 1764.

=== Scarletts Mill, Cowden ===
A mill here belonged to Richard Saxpes in 1516. It occupied the site later used for Scarletts Furnace. A corn mill was owned by the Knight family in 1768. It was working in 1932, but badly damaged in floods in 1937 and subsequently demolished. There was an overshot waterwheel.^{[Note 1]}

=== Cowden (Lower) Furnace ===
A furnace was at work in 1556 and in 1574 it was being worked by Michael West of Lyme. At this time it was in the possession of the Titchbourne family. Robert Titchbourne being one of the 59 men who signed the death warrant of Charles I. The furnace was in ruins by 1664 and the site was later used for a corn mill. The Cowden Gun, a spoilt casting was dug up here.^{[Note 1]}

=== Cowden (Old, Furnace) Mill ===
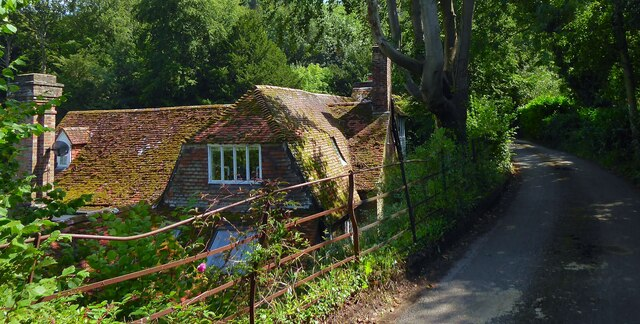
Cowden Mill

A corn mill was here in 1786, and closed down before the First World War. It has been converted to a dwelling.^{[Note 1]}

=== Kentwater Mill ===
This mill was clad in white weatherboarding, under a peg tile roof. It had an overshot waterwheel. It was demolished before World War Two.^{[Note 1]}

=== Holywych Mill ===
This mill had been demolished by 1598.

=== Blackham Mill ===
Blackham Mill had all wooden machinery, including the waterwheel. It was demolished before World War Two.^{[Note 1]}

=== Pilbeames Forge ===
TQ 505 403 51°08′31″N 0°09′09″E In 1588-90 Thomas Willoughbie owned a furnace and forge in the Chiddingstone parish. The furnace was let to Thomas Browne, the father of John Browne (possibly Bough Beech, but that is in Hever). In 1592 Richard Streatfeild leased Pilbeames Forge in Chiddingstone. He had previously been running the forge at Cansiron, Hartfield, Sussex. Pilbeams forge at that time was running four pairs of tongs. Richard Streatfeild died in 1601. The dam is recorded as 140 metres (150 yd) long and up to 1.5 metres (4 ft 11 in) high.^{[Note 1]}

== Bassetts Mill Stream (Kent Water tributary) ==
A stream enters the Kent Water from the left below Kentwater Mill. It powered a watermill.

=== Bassetts Mill, Cowden ===
TQ 495 413 51°09′05″N 0°08′19″E

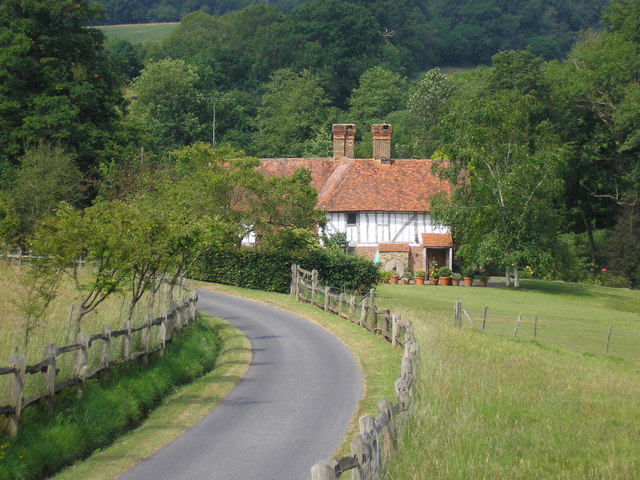
Bassett's Mill House

This mill was demolished c.1910 and ruins remained in 1933 and 1939 It appears to have had two pairs of millstones, the upright shaft was wooden. The mill house survives.^{[Note 1]}

== Pound Bridge Stream ==
A short stream enters the Medway from the right below Chafford Mill. It powered a watermill.

=== Pound Bridge Mill ===
TQ 537 409 51°08′48″N 0°11′54″E This was a corn mill, it was disused in 1932.^{[Note 1]}

== Barden Mill Stream ==
A stream rises in Broomhill, Southborough, and enters the Medway from the right downstream of the Pound Bridge Stream. It powered three watermills.

=== Broomhill Mill ===
TQ 566 414 51°09′01″N 0°14′24″E The site of this mill is near Redsheen stables. It had an overshot waterwheel.^{[Note 1]}

=== Bradley's Mill, Speldhurst ===
TQ 558 416, 51°09′10″N 0°13′37″E

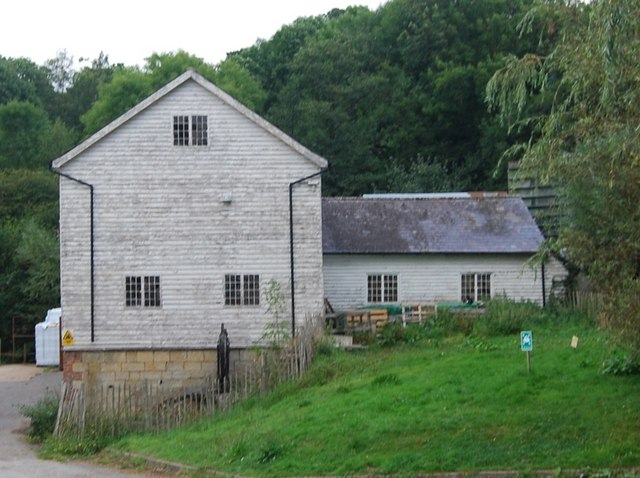
Bradley's Mill, August 2009

This corn mill was rebuilt in the 1850s, and has an overshot waterwheel. James Elstone was the miller in 1881.^{[Note 1]} The mill was working commercially until the late 1970s. In 2008, two planning applications were made for conversion of the mill to residential use but retaining the main machinery. The first was approved by Tunbridge Wells Borough Council, but a second application including seven new houses was rejected. A revised application was submitted in December 2009. Objections were raised by the Kent Mills Society and the Society for the Protection of Ancient Buildings.

=== Barden Furnace, Speldhurst ===
TQ 5387 4249 51°09′38″N 0°12′03″E This furnace may have been operated by David Willard in 1574. Thomas Smith leased it to Edmund and Abraham Willard in 1588. It was in use in 1630, and Sir James Hope visited and described it in 1646. It may have been in ruins in 1664 but guns were cast here in 1666. Output was 100 tons a year in 1717, last mentioned in 1761 it had been demolished by 1781.

=== Barden (Taylor's) Mill, Speldhurst ===
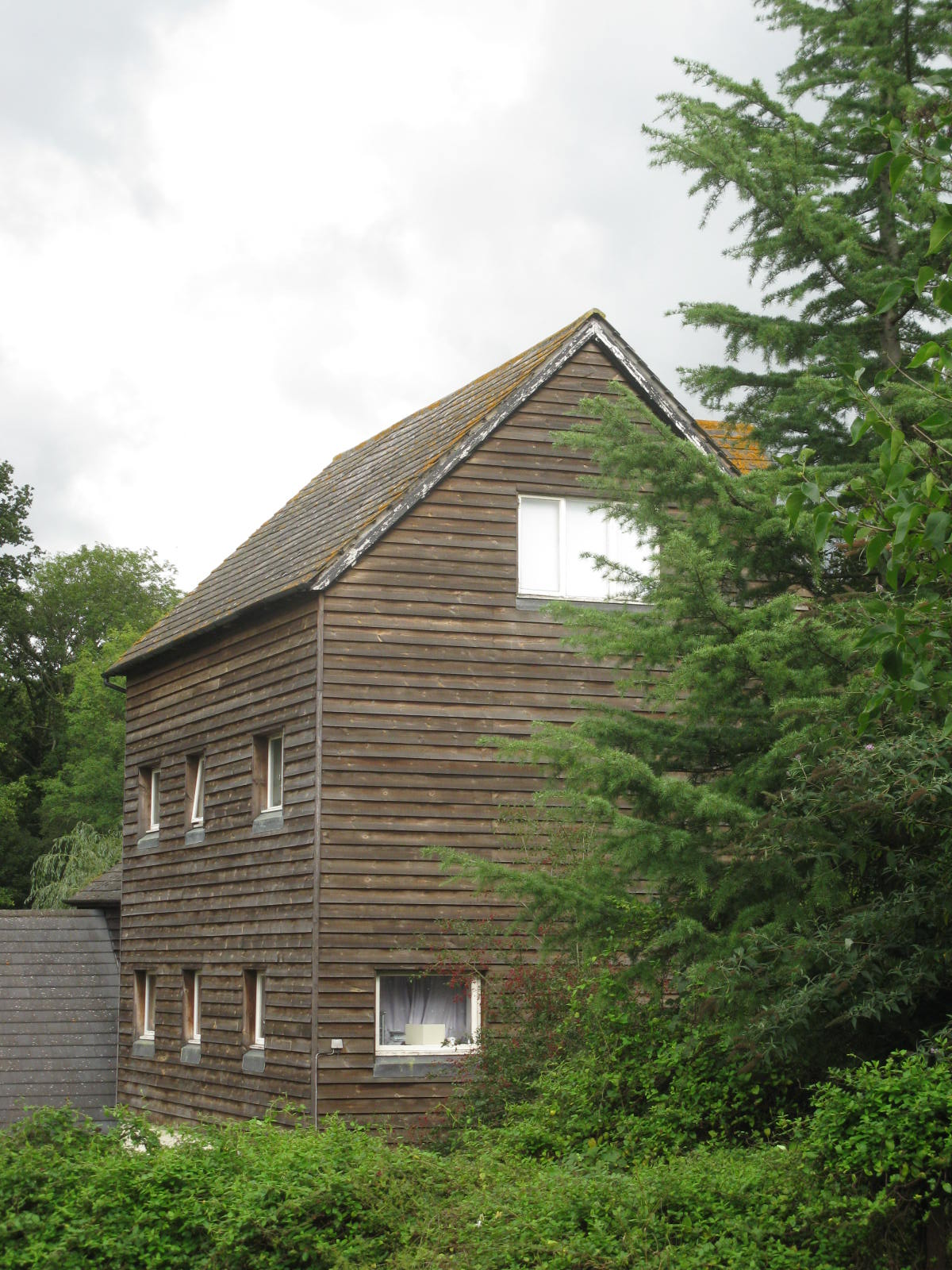
Barden Mill, September 2010

This corn mill was a brick building, built in the nineteenth century. It had an overshot waterwheel by Warren of Hawkhurst, which had been removed by 1940. The building remains, devoid of machinery.^{[Note 1]}

== Southborough Stream (Barden Mill Stream tributary) ==
A stream rises in Southborough and enters the Barden Mill Stream below Speldhurst Mill. It powered a watermill.

=== Modest Corner Mills ===
This mill was demolished in the nineteenth century.^{[Note 1]}

== River Eden ==
The River Eden powered a number of watermills. From source to the Medway they were:-

=== Titsey Mill ===
This was an old manorial mill. A Roman Villa at Titsey was converted into a fulling mill.^{[Note 1]}

=== Limpsfield Mill ===
TQ 404 534 51°15′44″N 0°00′41″E

The 1868 ordnance survey map identifies the site of this pre-conquest mill from the position of its sluice. This has been renewed and the pond is occasionally in water.

=== Tidy Green Mill, Limpsfield ===
This was a Domesday site, the mill at Limenensfeld then being valued at 2s. This mill may take its name from the Tydye/Tidy family. This mill was demolished in 1892.^{[Note 1]}

=== Upper Mill, Oxted ===
TQ 386 523 51°15′10″N 0°00′50″W

This mill was demolished in the late 18th century;^{[Note 1]} by 1817 the site of the millpond was used for cottages.

=== Middle Mill, Oxted ===
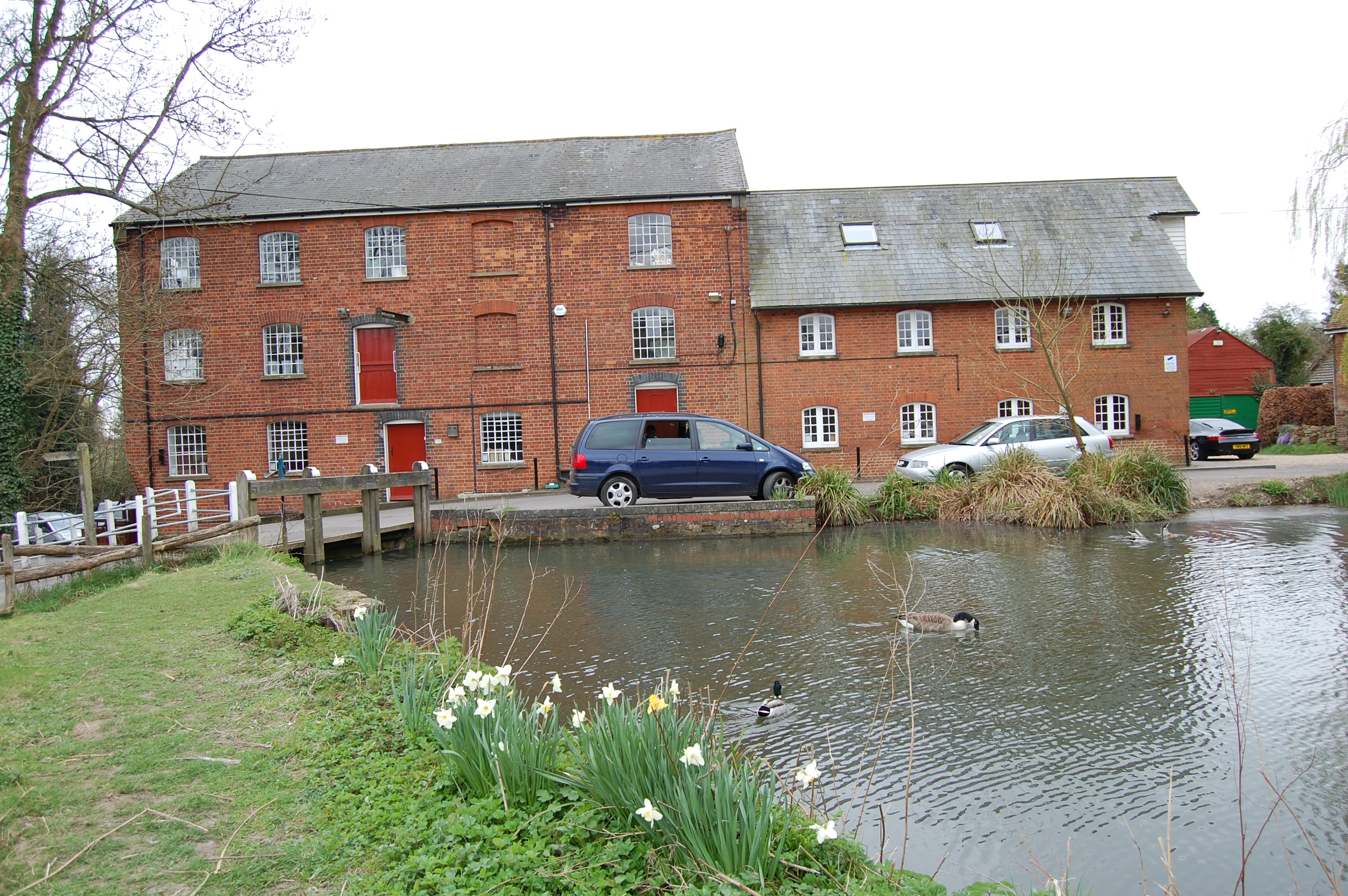
Middle Mill

TQ 390 513 51°14′55″N 0°00′35″W

The surviving corn mill building, now just "Oxted Mill", has been converted into offices. It dates from 1892-5, although on a site in use from much earlier. Originally two buildings, the older one housed an overshot wheel of 12 feet (3.7 m) diameter, breadth 5 feet 6 inches (1.7 m). The newer mill, opened on 12 June 1893, was a roller mill driven by a 4 feet (1.2 m) turbine producing 63 horsepower (47 kW) at 63 revolutions per minute. The building was used as a factory for making woodworking tools in the 1950s.

=== Coltsford (Cottsford) Mill, Oxted ===
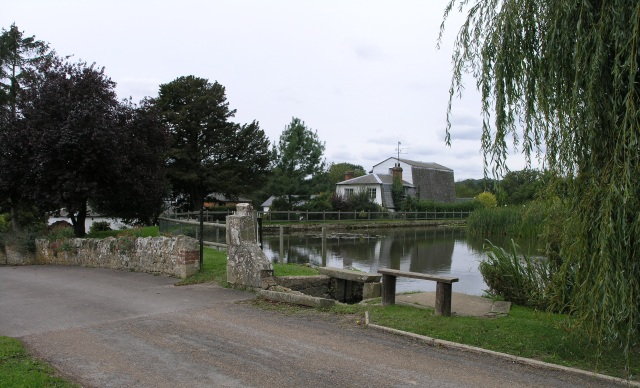
Coltsford Mill

TQ 397 506 51°14′15″N 0°00′08″E

A Domesday site. This mill retains its machinery, which dates from c.1860 and is all cast iron. The mill is used as a corporate event centre, and there is a trout fishery nearby. The cast iron waterwheel still turns.^{[Note 1]}

=== mill site ===
This mill stood just downstream of Coltsford mill, it may have been known as "Crowherstmelle".^{[Note 1]}

=== Haxted Mill, Edenbridge ===
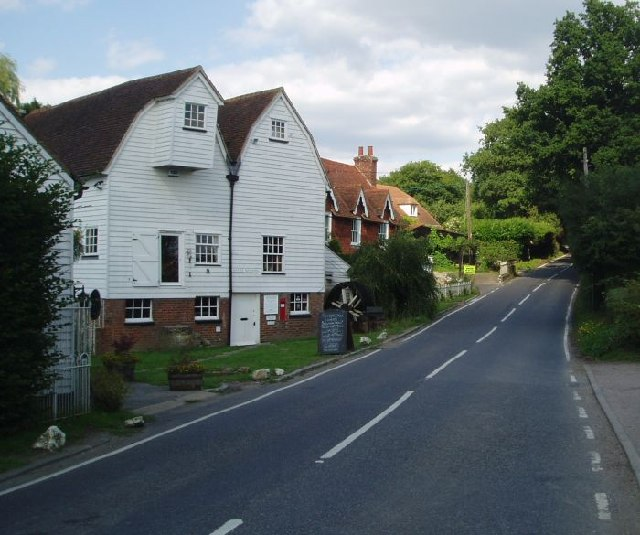
Haxted Mill

TQ 418 455 51°11′28″N 0°01′49″E

Haxted Watermill stands in Surrey, close to the border with Kent. It is a Domesday site and the mill was mentioned in the will of Sir Reginald de Cobham in 1361. The western half of the building dates to c.1580 and the eastern half dates to 1794. The mill was last used to grind flour in 1919 but worked until 1945. It was turned into a museum in 1969 but is now a brasserie and bar.^{[Note 1]} The current overshot waterwheel has a diameter of 10 feet (3.05 m) and a width of 9 feet (2.74 m). It was installed in about 1830, but by 1972 the 72 iron buckets had failed and were replaced by fibreglass replicas. The bearing-stone for an earlier, undershot waterwheel was found during renovation and this dates to the fourteenth century. In full working order the current wheel produced about 11 horsepower (8.2 kW), rotating at 8 r.p.m. and driving three pairs of millstones, through gearing, at 120 r.p.m. The pit wheel and wallower are of the same date as the waterwheel, but the great spur wheel, made of oak with applewood teeth, has been dated to 1580. The mill originally operated three pairs of millstones, but in the later years of its working life one pair was removed.

=== Town (Honour's) Mill, Edenbridge ===
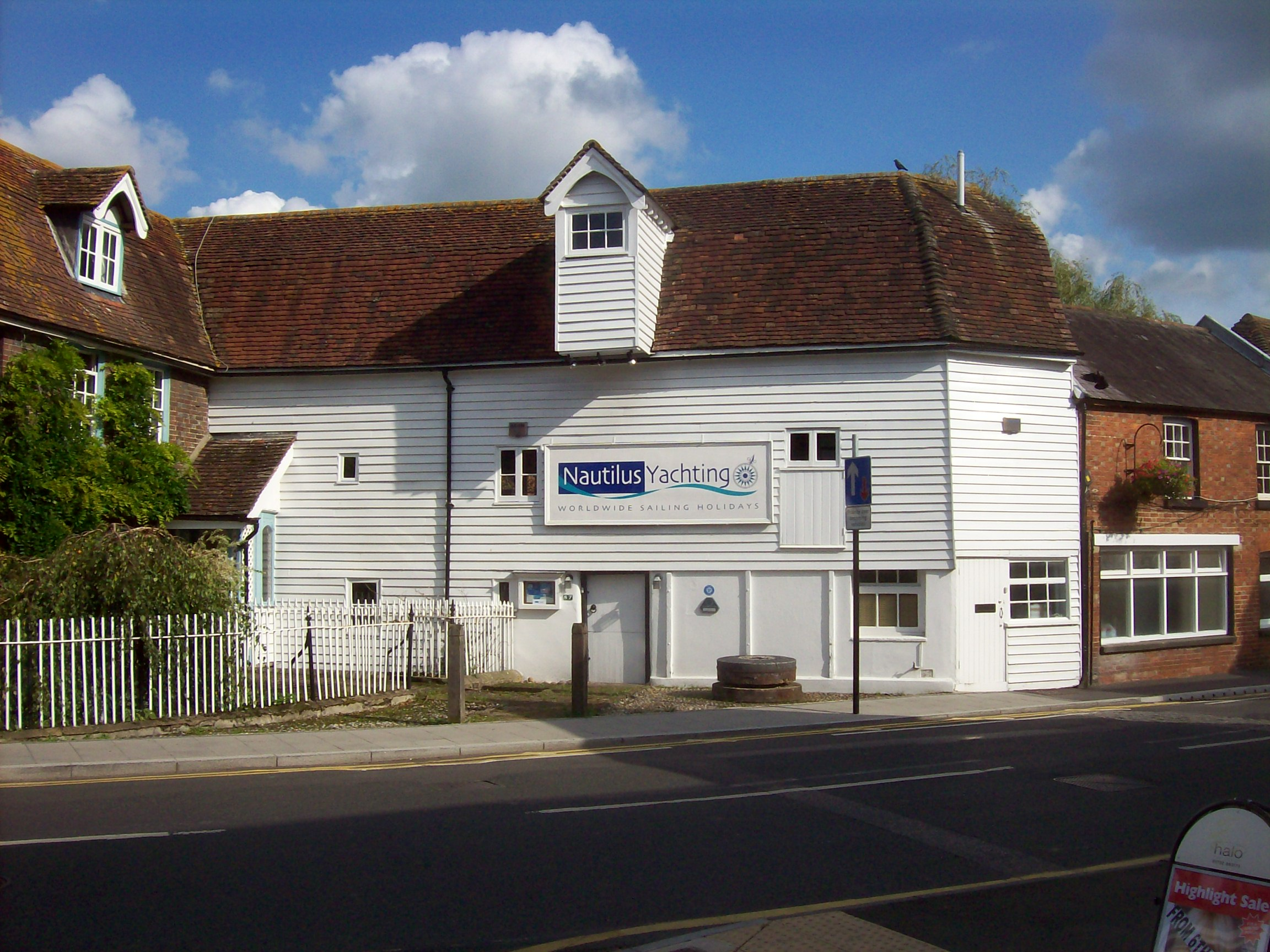
The mill in 2008

In 1291 a water powered pump was at work here, draining the marshland between Lingfield and Edenbridge. The present corn mill building dates to the early nineteenth century, but incorporates parts of an older structure. The cast iron low breastshot waterwheel drove three pairs of stones. The mill last ground by water sometime before the First World War, and was working by electricity into the 1970s. The waterwheel was used to work ancillary machinery until 1968, when the cast iron pit wheel was broken in the floods of that year.^{[Note 1]}

=== Hever Castle Mill ===
There was a corn mill at Hever Castle.

=== Chiddingstone (Cranstead) Mill ===
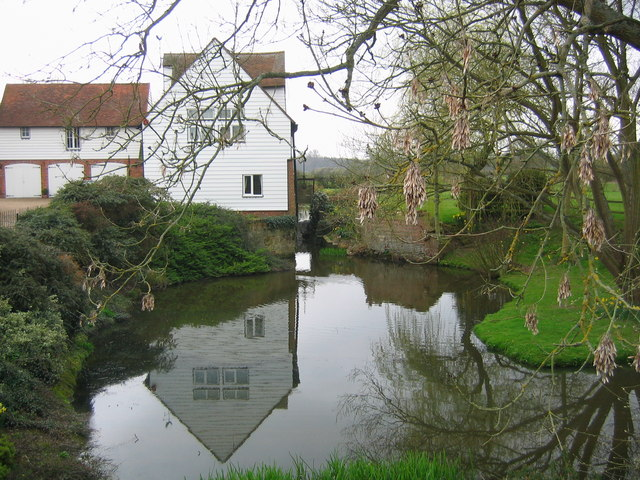
The house converted mill.

TQ 496 461 51°11′40″N 0°08′31″E

Possibly a Domesday site. In the eighteenth century the millers were the Keeys family, Richard c.1740, followed by his son Richard. In 1840 the mill was owned by Henry Streatfield and in the occupation of James Young. The wife of his son James Jr died in 1853, James Jr was describes as being "of Chiddingstone mill". The mill was last worked in the 1930s. This mill was a derelict shell for many years, but the building has now been house converted. No machinery survives. A picture of the mill before conversion can be seen here and more pictures can be seen here..^{[Note 1]}

=== Vexour Park mill ===
TQ 511 454 approx 51°11′16″N 0°09′47″E A weir in Vexour Park marks the site of a long vanished watermill.

== Gibbs Brook (Eden tributary) ==
The Gibbs Brook, formerly known as the Gippes River powered four watermills.

=== Ivy Mill, Godstone ===
This mill belonged to the manor of Chevington in Bletchingley. In 1698 the owner was George Whatman, the mill being partly rebuilt in that year. A photograph of Ivy Mill in 1898 can be seen here. It was burnt down in the 1920s.^{[Note 1]}

=== Leigh Mill, Godstone ===
This Domesday mill was valueless in 1349, as all the soke tenants had perished in the plague. It had previously been worth 20s or 30s per year. In the Elizabethan times the mill was used as a gunpowder mill, in the ownership of George Evelyn, grandfather of diarist John Evelyn. On 28 January 1589 Evelyn was granted a wide-ranging royal licence to explore for saltpetre, a principal ingredient, and his mills at Godstone were the most important in the country. The mill has been house converted, only the axle and pit wheel remaining of the machinery.

== Eden Brook (Eden tributary) ==
The Eden Brook powered three watermills.

=== Hedgecourt Mill, Felbridge ===
TQ 359 404 51°08′48″N 0°03′22″W This was an old hammer mill site. The mill was first mentioned in 1562 when John Thorpe was listed as repairing buildings, the mill and banks to the value of £64. He was leasing the manor of Hedgecourt from the Gage family of Firle at the time. In 1567 John Thorpe took out a 21 year lease on the mill, the mills being described as "newly erected" and having an overshot waterwheel. In 1594, the mill was in the tenancy of Thomas Thorpe, son of John Thorpe. In 1652, the mill was in the tenance of Robert Filkes of Godstone. In 1663, John Finch took out an eleven-year lease on Hedgecourt Mill. A toll chest is mentioned in the lease, indicating that the mill was a corn mill, at least in part. He was still there in 1669, paying a half-yearly rent of £14 and tax of 2/-. By March 1670 Joseph Marchant had joined him, but he died in 1674. His widow Sarah took out a lease on the mill in October of that year. The mill passed to her son John in 1688. In 1701, Joseph Marchant (son of John) was at the mill. He built or extended a house in 1701, possibly an extension to the mill. In 1723, Joseph Marchant renewed his lease on the mill and in 1739 James Marchant (son of Joseph) took a sixty-year lease with William Clayton of Marden on 6 acres (2.4 ha) of Hedgecourt Heath in Horne, on which to erect a windmill. The mill was an open trestle post mill. Joseph Marchant seems to have retired by 1742. An unexecuted lease of 1743 mentions that the miller has permission to take timber for the purpose of making charcoal (used in the smelting of iron). The site remained in the ownership of the Gage family until 1745, when Colonel Edward Evelyn bought it. It was a furnace mill at that time. Edward Evelyn commissioned a map of his new estate. This was drawn by J Bourd of Tunbridge Wells, Kent in 1748. James Marchant was still at the mill in 1773, when he bequeathed all his possessions to his brother Benjamin Marchant, a cooper and innkeeper of Cheam, Surrey. James Marchant seems to have retired in the 1780s. The next known millers were Messrs Stenning, Lock and Stone are recorded as paying rent for the Mill at Hedgecourt. This can only be the watermill as the windmill had gone by 1789. Thomas Stone was the miller in 1814, followed by his son John, who was joined by Laurence Hardy by 1822. John Saunders was the miller in 1840, having previously been at Wiremill. Saunders was still at the mill in 1855 when it was sold by Lady Selina Charlotte, Viscountess Milton to George Gatty. At that time the mill had an 11 feet (3.35 m) diameter overshot waterwheel driving two pairs of millstones. John Tully Coomber had joined Saunders by 1858, working the mill until at least 1861. George Gatty died in 1864 and the mill passed to his son Charles Henry Gatty. Robert Bartley was the miller in 1869, working the mill until at least 1871 and then Sydney Killick was the miller in 1881, followed by Thomas Colvin who was there in 1891. Charles Gatty died in 1903, and the mill passed to two of his cousins, Charles Lane Sayer and Alfred Leighton Sayer. The mill was probably still operable at this time. In 1910 the mill was sold to Percy Portway Harvey, and in 1916 the mill was in the ownership of Henry Willis Rudd, later passing to a Belgian by the name of Mr Honore Dubar. The mill was visited by Robert Thurston Hopkins in 1926, the machinery still being intact at this time. A picture of the mill c.1926 can be seen here. The mill was also visited by J Hillier in 1948, who was researching a book on Surrey watermills. by this time the mill was a ruin, still containing its machinery. The upper floors of the mill were demolished in 1949 with the lower part of the mill being used as a boat store. in 1962, the Dubars sold the mill to John Edwards. The mill house was condemned in 1964 and stood empty until 1969. The building being then converted and extended to form two residences.

Machinery

Overshot waterwheel, cast iron spokes, wooden soleboard and buckets, 12 feet 6 inches (3.81 m) diameter by 6 feet (1.83 m) wide on an oak axle, driving a 9 feet 6 inches (2.90 m) diameter cast iron pit wheel with oak cogs. This drove a cast iron wallower on a wooden hexagonal upright shaft, driving a wooden Great Spur Wheel 8 feet (2.44 m) in diameter, driving two pairs of millstones.^{[Note 1]}

=== Felcourt (Woodcock Hammer, Weir, Wire) Mill, Felbridge ===
An old hammer mill site, at work from 1567 to 1786. One of the names indicates that the mill was a drawing mill at one time. In 1533, the effects of Thomas Gaynesford included a hammer mill. The property had been bought by Gaynesford from Sir John Gage in 1550. In 1559, Nicholas Norton was a miller grinding grain near lands called Shawnors, followed by John Myller in 1560 to 1563, when John Rodgers succeeded him. in 1567, Wiremill was being worked by John Thorpe. In the 1560s, there are several references to Woodcock Hammer or Forge being worked by Swanne. Woodcock Forge is believed to have been built by Jack Dancy of Turners Hill. Hedgecourt Mill is thought to have been remodelled by him about the same time. The pond at Hedgecourt acted as a storage for the Woodcock forge. The tilt hammer was operated by an overshot waterwheel. Another overshot waterwheel worked bellows. In 1574, John Thorpe of Hedgecourt was working the forge in connection with the furnace at Myllwood. in 1586 Thorpe bought property from William Swanne Sr in the Woodcock Forge area. From 1598 to 1606 the rent was paid by Thomas Thorpe, son of John and in 1629 the forge was leased by John Gage to Richard Thorpe, the son of Thomas. His son, also Richard, held the forge until 1651, when it was forfeit in lieu of a debt. Thorpe's interest in the forge was sold to Simon Everenden of Cliffe near Lewes. In the 1650s the forge was in the occupation of John Newnham. In 1664, the forge was lease by Jeremy Johnson Jr of Charlwood. In 1672, woodland next to the pond was referred to as "Hammerwood" also known as "Wire Wood" thus indicating a drawing mill. John Newnham died in 1707, and his wife died in 1719, but the forge was known as "Mr Johnson's Forge" in 1717. At that time the output from the forge was some 40 long tons (41 t) per annum. By 1729 the forge was in the occupation of Thomas Stanford, who was converting sows from Heathfield furnace at Woodcock Forge. Stanford does not seem to have had any connections with the Wealden iron industry after 1738. In 1742 Samuel Baker was in occupation, followed by Edward Raby and Alexander Master in 1758. They were supplying the Board of Ordnance with several gauges of bar iron, staff iron and rolled plate. Raby & Master were bankrupt in 1764. Edward Raby died in 1771, and the forge was taken over by his son Alexander until 1774, when the Government forced him to give up Woodcock furnace in a wrangle over the size of his moulds. Joseph Wright and Thomas Pickett took the business, but it is thought that the Hammer Mill ceased to be used c.1787. In 1800, the name Wire Mill is first used. Daniel Fossick held Wire Mill from 1800 to 1816, when he died. The mill was sold to James Jenner, who converted it to a corn mill. Jenner was at Wire Mill until 1844, when he was succeeded by William Brand. In 1838 he was joined by John Saunders, the mill being known as Woodcock Mill then. Saunders left in 1840 to take Hedgecourt Mill and William Brand joined Jenner. Jenner died in 1844 and Thomas Brand took the mill, which was known as Wire Mill in 1851. At this time the mill had two overshot waterwheels and drove four pairs of millstones. In 1855 the mill lake covered 14 acres (5.7 ha). Thomas Brand was still running the mill in 1871, assisted by his son Thomas, John Holman and John Burfield, all described as millers in the census of that year. In 1881, Thomas Brand (son) was the miller at Wire Mill. He ran the mill until 1887/88 when David Dadswell took the mill. Wire Mill was sold in 1911, described as having two overshot waterwheels and the mill lake covered 11 acres (4.5 ha) at this time. A picture of the mill c.1911 can be seen here. The mill was not sold and again offered for auction in 1912, again without success. A third attempt at auction in 1918 saw the mill being bought by a Major Crum. He sold it to a Miss Wilkins who had the building converted to residential use in 1920. The mill was purchased by the Women's Farm and Garden Union in 1922 and by 1929 was the Wire Mill Tea Gardens. By 1933 it was the Wire Mill Fishing Club and in 1948 the Wire Mill Hotel and Fishing Club. By 1962 the property was known as the Wiremill Lakeside Hotel, Country and Fishing Club. Over the next decade the Country Club grew in popularity, leading to complaints and the local council refused to renew the clubs music and dancing license. In 1986 the mill was again sold, and although damaged by a fire during renovations reopened as a restaurant in September of that year. The mill was sold again in 1996 and 2000 and is now a pub. The building is devoid of machinery.^{[Note 1]}

=== Lingfield Tannery ===
This tannery was water powered. It stood opposite the present day Lingfield Racecourse. In 1684 the mansion house of Batnors (later Battners) was bought by James Farindon. This included the tanyard, drying sheds and mill thereto. A map of John Gainsford's lands in 1679 shows Gateland Farm was previously known as Tanners Farm. The farm was later the home of Robert Boreman, who died in 1715. The Tannery building was rebuilt by J T Kelsey c.1840. A planning application to demolish the "historic old tannery" was made in 1996 and the site is now a small housing development.

== Crooked River (Eden Tributary) ==
This rises in springs to the south of the Greensand Ridge at the edge of Limpsfield Common, Surrey. It joins the Kent Brook at TQ 421 480, just to the west of the hamlet of Troy Town, Kent.

=== Doghurst Mill ===
TQ 412 508 51°14′23″N 0°01′17″E At Itchingwood Common, near the source of the Crooked River. On the 1868 county survey the building is standing, but shown as "site of former water mill" and the mill pond is unwatered.

== Felbridge Water (Eden tributary) ==
The Felbridge Water is a tributary of the Eden Brook. It powered two watermills.

=== Clarkes Mill, Lingfield ===
TQ 401 402 51°08′38″N 0°00′14″E This was a hammer mill, owned by Lady Gage in 1574.

=== Ware (Weir) Mill, Felbridge ===
A mill was on this site in 1241, when Stephen the miller held it of William de Adburton at a rent of 11s annually. In 1347, the mill was granted to John Gainsford. In 1406 William Atte Hurst obtained "Crowherstmelle" from the Marchant family, and granted it to William Gainsford. This may refer to this mill (but see above).^{[Note 1]}

== Other tributaries of the Eden ==
There are other tributaries feeding the River Eden that also powered watermills.

=== Four Elms Mill, Hever ===
Possibly the site of the Hever mill mentioned in 1279, when Roland, son of Peter de Broke, attempting to "twirl the wheel" was dragged into the cogs and crushed to death. The mill had an overshot wheel and had been demolished by 1933.^{[Note 1]}

=== Bough Beech Furnaces, Hever ===
TQ 4813 4756 51°12′27″N 0°07′15″E and TQ 4816 4760 51°12′28″N 0°07′17″E. An old hammer mill site, two furnaces are known to have existed.

=== Christmas Mill, Edenbridge ===
51°10′29″N 0°03′54″E (TQ 444 436) This was a double mill (i.e. having two waterwheels) in 1347, then in the possession of William de Shernden. The mill building survives, converted into a dwelling.^{[Note 1]} The miller in 1841 was J Bassett.

=== Salman's Farm Mill, Penshurst ===
TQ 512 434 A Domesday site, this corn mill was powered supplied by a pond fed by a stream. It was powered by a cast iron overshot waterwheel and the machinery was removed in the early 1930s. The cast iron axle survives.^{[Note 1]}

== Sources ==
- ^Note 1 = Reid, Kenneth (1987). "Chapter 10". Watermills of the London Countryside, Vol 1. Cheddar, Somerset, UK: Charles Skilton Ltd. ISBN 0-284-39165-4.
- ^Note 2 = Fuller & Spain (1986). Watermills (Kent and the Borders of Sussex). Maidstone: Kent Archaeological Society. ISBN 0-906746-08-6.
