= John Browne (King's Gunfounder) =

- Died: 1651
- Occupation: Gunfounder
- Known for: Gunfounder to Charles I
- Spouse: Martha

John Browne was an English merchant, the first holder of the post of King's Gunfounder, which was created in 1615. He was heavily involved in the Wealden iron industry, controlling six furnaces in Surrey and Sussex, two in the Forest of Dean, as well as his own furnace between Brenchley and Horsmonden.

== Biography ==
During the reign of Charles I, he sold a great number of guns to the former United Provinces, with the King being a partner in this traffic.

Browne also held a patent that gave him a monopoly on the casting of pots, pans and firebacks.

John Browne developed a type of cannon known as "The Drake" in the 1620s. This cannon was much lighter than previous cannons firing a similar weight of shot, thus enabling ships to be more heavily armed. One such cannon made by Browne was recovered from the wreck of the English ship Swan, a 200 long tons (200 t) Cromwellian warship lost in a storm off the Isle of Mull in 1653 whilst attacking Duart Castle. This cannon weighed 3cwt, 2qtrs, 23 lbs (415 pounds (188 kg)) and had a 3½" (89mm) muzzle. It fired shot weighing 4 pounds (1.81 kg).Swan was the last ship built for Charles I, and its guns were all cast in iron. A larger ship, Sovereign of the Seas had 92 Drakes cast in bronze, as well as 10 non-Drakes, also cast in bronze.

In 1642, John Browne was ordered by Parliament to deliver a list of "grenadoes" being held at the Stillyard, and he was not to deliver them except with the Order of the House. In 1645, John Browne and his son were ordered by Parliament to be taken into safe custody, and no visitor was allowed to be alone with either of them because he was suspected of supporting the Royalist cause. Browne appears to have been released in December 1645. John Browne died in 1651. In 1677, another John Browne built a boring mill at Birchden Forge, Rotherfield.

Browne's wife, Martha, is commemorated by a cast iron graveslab in St Margaret's Church, Horsmonden.

== Sources ==
- F C Clark (1947). Kentish Fire. Rye, Sussex: Adams & Son.
