= Pieter de Groot =

Dutch regent and diplomat (1615-1678)

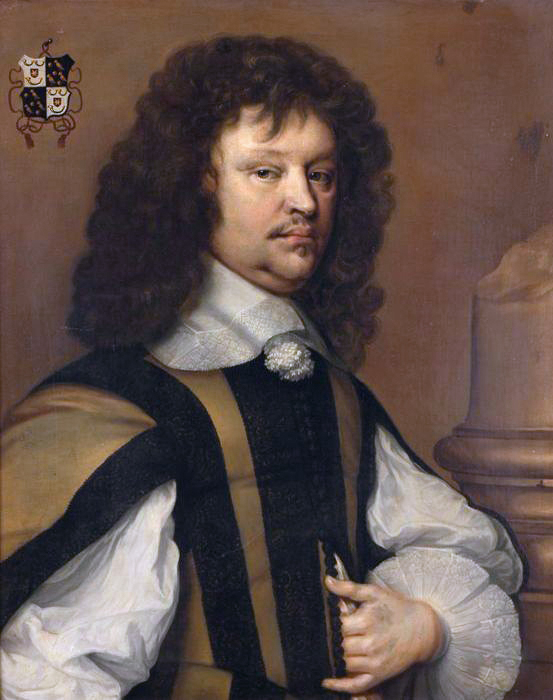
- Pieter de Groot in c. 1652–1660 by the circle of Adriaen Hanneman
- Born: 28 March 1615; Rotterdam, Dutch Republic
- Died: 2 June 1678 (aged 63); Boekenrode, Dutch Republic
- Occupations: Regent, diplomat

Pieter de Groot (28 March 1615 – 2 June 1678) was a Dutch regent and diplomat during the First Stadtholderless Period of the Dutch Republic. He led the Dutch delegation that vainly tried to negotiate the Dutch capitulation to King Louis XIV of France during the Year of Disaster, 1672.

== Family life ==
Pieter de Groot was born in Rotterdam, the second son of Hugo de Groot and Maria van Reigersbergen. After his father's celebrated escape from Loevestein castle in 1621, he followed his parents into exile in Paris. Because of this Loevestein-connection (the name of the state prison was also used as an epithet by his Orangist opponents) it was later said of him that he was un oeuf pourri, couvé à Louvestein and he indeed suffered from a weak constitution all his life. His father personally schooled him, and took care of a broad education. He studied law at Leiden University.

He was twice married, first on 6 October 1652 at The Hague to Agatha van Rijn, and after her death in 1673, on 11 July 1675 at Rijswijk to his cousin Alida de Groot.

== Career ==
After having spent a year assisting his father at the Swedish legation in Paris in 1637 he returned to the Netherlands and practiced law till Charles I Louis, Elector Palatine appointed him his ambassador to the States-General of the Netherlands in 1649. He remained in this post till 1660.

In that year he was appointed Pensionary of the city of Amsterdam. As such he was a staunch adherent of the States-Party faction of Grand Pensionary Johan de Wit. When he was ejected from that post as a consequence of the political upheavals that brought the Valckenier-faction to power in 1668, De Witt saw to it that he was appointed Dutch ambassador to Sweden. Two years later he became Dutch ambassador to France. He remained in that post during the difficult years leading up to the start of the Franco-Dutch War in 1672. He warned of the French war preparations, but was ignored by the Dutch government.

== Capitulation negotiations ==
De Groot had been appointed Pensionary of his native city of Rotterdam in 1670. He now took up that function and represented his city in the States of Holland and the States-General. The latter body decided to use his expertise in diplomacy with the French court after the French armies under the personal command of King Louis XIV had made a whirlwind advance into Dutch territory, and captured the important city of Utrecht. It was felt that the defense of the republic was about to collapse, and that the only way to avoid an unconditional surrender was to offer Louis the Generality Lands and a large war indemnity. De Groot was sent to Louis' headquarters at Utrecht with this offer on 26 June 1672. However, Louis demanded additional concessions, like the cession of the Nijmegen Quarter of the province of Gelderland, and public toleration of Catholic worship throughout the republic.

The news of these negotiations caused a public outcry. The citizenry of the major Dutch cities now revolted against the De Witt regime (De Witt himself was severely wounded in an assassination attempt around this time, and could no longer take part in the government). One of the cities where the government was overthrown was Rotterdam. The Rotterdam vroedschap was forced at gunpoint by the city militia to swear that they would not give up the city to the French (as their Utrecht colleagues had done a few days before), without the consent of the citizenry. After the abortive negotiations De Groot and five of his colleagues in the city government were denounced as traitors by the Mob. The city militia closed the gates to a force of cavalry, sent by the States of Holland to restore order. The house of two burgomasters were sacked by the Mob. De Groot was personally threatened and had to move about under militia escort. He fled to Antwerp later in July. His post as Pensionary was taken over by the Orangist Johan Kievit who would shortly play a leading role in the lynching of the De Witt brothers.

== Exile and trial ==
Though in exile and disgrace with the new regime of Stadtholder William III De Groot could not resist interfering with diplomatic developments. He traveled to Cologne (by way of Liège and Aachen) where he offered his valuable services to the Dutch diplomats negotiating peace with the Elector in 1673.

In 1674 he was allowed to return to the republic, only to be drawn into the scandal around Abraham de Wicquefort. That diplomat of Dutch descent, but with French connections, was accused and convicted of high treason in 1675. Unfortunately, De Groot had extensively corresponded with him, and his letters were considered highly compromising. De Groot, too, was therefore accused of high treason and court-martialed in 1674. He was acquitted on 7 December 1676 thanks to the able defense provided by his attorney Simon van Poelgeest.

The trial undermined his already weak health. He retired to his estate of Boekenrode, near Haarlem, where he spent his last years writing poetry. He died there, worn out, in June 1678.

== Works ==
- Overgebleven rymstukken van en op J.H.W. en P. de Groot (Delft 1722)

== Sources ==
- Edmundson, G. "Review of Lettres de Pierre de Groot, Ambassadeur des Provinces-Unies a Abraham de Wicquefort, Résident des Ducs de Brunswick" in: Gardiner, S.R. and Poole, R.L. (eds.) (1897) The English Historical Review. Vol. XII, pp. 174–176
