= 1615 Arica earthquake =

Major earthquake in Peru

- Location within South America
- Local date: 16 September 1615
- Magnitude: 7.5 M_{s}
- Epicenter: 18.500°S 70.350°W
- Areas affected: Arica; Spanish Empire
- Total damage: Moderate
- Tsunami: Small
- Casualties: 3 injured

The 1615 Arica earthquake was centered in the Spanish colonial Viceroyalty of Peru, within the present day Arica y Parinacota Region of northwestern Chile.

The earthquake caused considerable damage to the infrastructure of the city with the Iglesia Mayor. The city's fort collapsed, and cracks opened in the floor of the royal quicksilver storage facility. No human was reported dead but three people suffered injuries.
