= Kajali, Palghar =

Village in Maharashtra

Kajali
- village
- Location in Maharashtra, India Kajali (India)
- Coordinates: 20.2045362°N 72.8781322°E
- Country: India
- State: Maharashtra
- District: Palghar
- Taluka: Talasari
- Elevation: 72 m (236 ft)

Population (2011)
  - Total: 1,019
- Time zone: UTC+5:30 (IST)
- 2011 census code: 551533

Kajali is a village in the Palghar district of Maharashtra, India. It is located in the Talasari taluka.

== Demographics ==
According to the 2011 census of India, Kajali has 196 households. The effective literacy rate (i.e. the literacy rate of population excluding children aged 6 and below) is 57.86%.

Demographics (2011 Census)
	Total	Male	Female
Population	1019	518	501
Children aged below 6 years	160	79	81
Scheduled caste	0	0	0
Scheduled tribe	940	467	473
Literates	497	322	175
Workers (all)	326	274	52
Main workers (total)	280	237	43
Main workers: Cultivators	89	84	5
Main workers: Agricultural labourers	61	37	24
Main workers: Household industry workers	0	0	0
Main workers: Other	130	116	14
Marginal workers (total)	46	37	9
Marginal workers: Cultivators	2	2	0
Marginal workers: Agricultural labourers	11	6	5
Marginal workers: Household industry workers	0	0	0
Marginal workers: Others	33	29	4
Non-workers	693	244	449
