= Kuwana Yoshinari =

Samurai

Kuwana Yoshinari (桑名吉成; 1551 – June 2, 1615) was one of three chief retainers under the Chōsokabe clan during the latter years of the Sengoku period of Feudal Japan. He was also known as Kuwana Kazutaka (桑名一孝).
