= Hadlow (disambiguation) =

Hadlow may refer to

== Places ==
- Hadlow, Kent
  - Hadlow Castle
  - St. Mary's Church, Hadlow
  - Hadlow Cricket Club
  - Hadlow College
- Hadlow Down, East Sussex
  - St Mark's Church, Hadlow Down
  - Providence Chapel, Hadlow Down
- Hadlow Road railway station, The Wirral
- Hadlow, New Zealand, a locality near Timaru
- Hadlow Preparatory School, a school in Masterton, New Zealand

== People ==
- Aaron Hadlow (b 1988) British professional kiteboarder
- Janice Hadlow (b 1957) British television executive
- Mark Hadlow (b 1957) New Zealand actor and comedian
- William Hadlow (1861–1931), philatelic auctioneer

== Ships ==
- Hadlow (1814 ship), a ship that transported convicts to Australia
- Hadlow (HBC vessel), operated by the HBC from 1815-1817, see Hudson's Bay Company vessels
