= Landscape of Ashdown Forest =

UK lowland heathland

Ashdown Forest
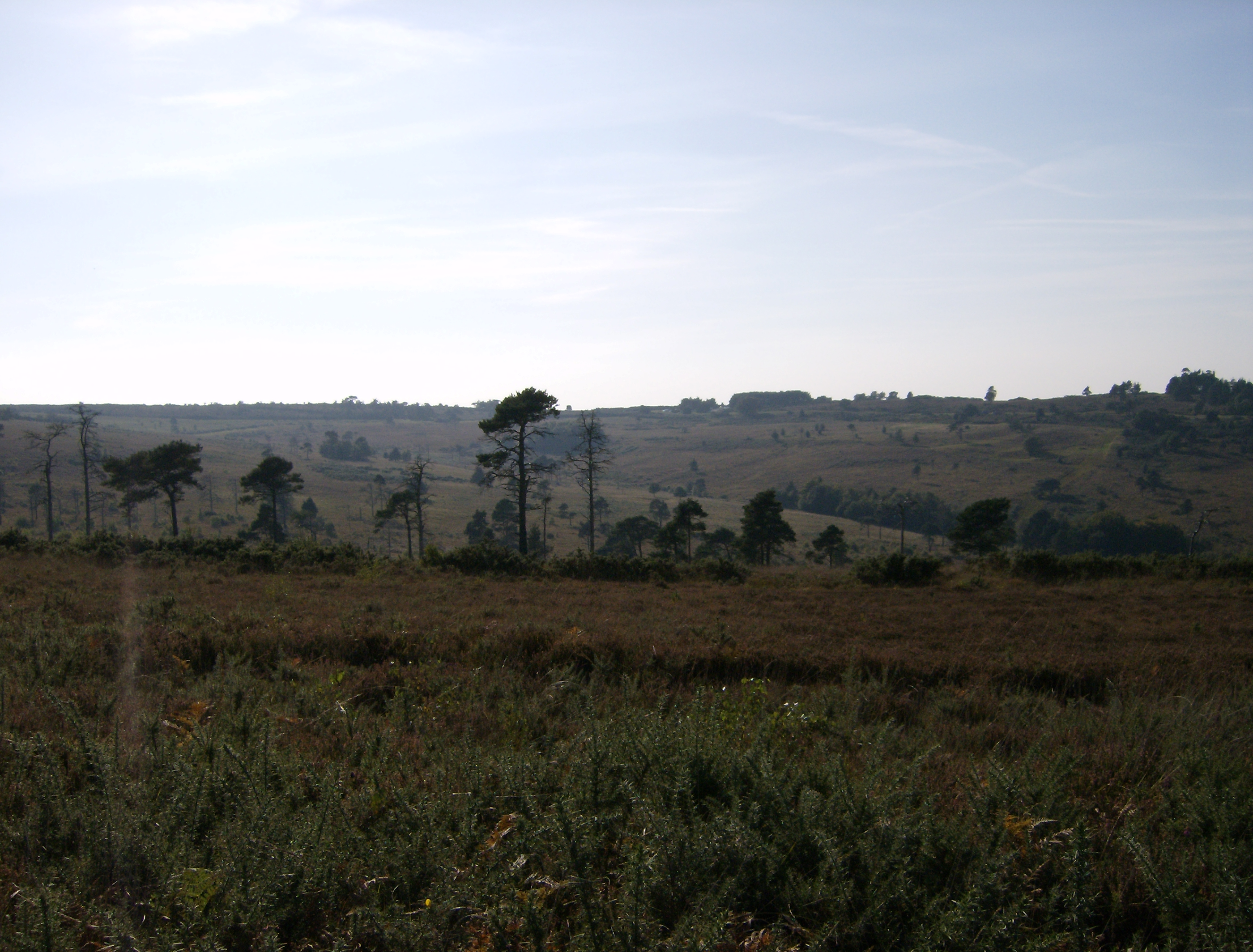
- Ashdown Forest near Greenwood Gate Clump

- Location within the United Kingdom
- Location: East Sussex, England
- Coordinates: 51°04′21″N 0°02′35″E
- Governing body: The Conservators of Ashdown Forest
- Website: www.ashdownforest.org

Ashdown Forest, a former royal hunting forest situated some 30 miles south-east of London, is a large area of lowland heathland whose ecological importance has been recognised by its designation as a UK Site of Special Scientific Interest and by the European Union as a Special Protection Area for birds and a Special Area of Conservation for its heathland habitats, and by its membership of Natura 2000, which brings together Europe's most important and threatened wildlife areas.

Ashdown Forest lies within the High Weald Area of Outstanding Natural Beauty, "...one of the best surviving, intact medieval landscapes in Northern Europe", characterised by rolling hills, steep-sided ghyll streams, sandstone outcrops, nationally high woodland cover, many interconnected ancient woods, narrow sunken lanes, scattered farmsteads and hamlets, small irregular-shaped fields, and open heaths, of which Ashdown is the greatest example.

The forest's distinctive open heathland landscape with its hilltop clumps of conifer trees has been immortalised in the illustrations provided by EH Shepard for the Winnie-the-Pooh stories of A. A. Milne, who lived on the northern edge of the forest at Chuck Hatch.

== Influences on the forest landscape and ecology ==
=== Influence of geology and climate ===
Ashdown Forest's landscape is greatly influenced by its underlying geology, which is mostly the sandstone and siltstone strata of the Ashdown Sands, part of the Hastings Beds formation. This, when combined with a local climate that is generally wetter, cooler and windier than the surrounding area owing to the forest's elevation, rising from 200 feet (61 m) to over 700 feet (210 m) above sea level, give rise to sandy, largely podzolic soils that are characteristically acid, clay, and nutrient-poor. These poor, infertile soils have favoured the development of heathland, valley mires and damp woodland. These conditions have never favoured cultivation and have been a barrier to agricultural improvement, but they have favoured hunting activities, woodland industries and extractive industries.

=== Impact of commoning and similar activities ===
Despite its attractive wild, unspoilt appearance, Ashdown Forest's landscape is essentially man-made.

From medieval times until the mid-20th century the forest's commoners (and other local people who have, less legitimately, exploited the forest resources) played an important role in maintaining the forest's heathland through their exploitation of the forest's woods and heaths: grazing large numbers of livestock such as cattle and pigs, which suppressed the growth of trees and scrub, cutting down or paring trees or collecting windblown wood for use as firewood or for other purposes, cutting dead bracken for use as livestock bedding, burning patches of heathland, and so on. Large numbers of livestock are known to have been grazed on the forest at times; for example, at the end of the 13th century the commoners were turning out 2,000-3,000 cattle onto the forest, alongside the 1,000-2,000 deer that were also present, while a 1297 document records that the forest was being grazed by almost 2,700 swine.

The long-standing predominance of heathland over woodland on the forest may in fact owe much to human intervention over a much longer period of time, and in this respect it may reflect the development of heathland in Britain generally, where the earliest evidence of heathland dates to Mesolithic times, before the introduction of agriculture, and where the emergence of heathlands on a large-scale seems to have taken place in the Neolithic and Bronze Ages following the introduction of agriculture. Even in Anglo-Saxon times, heathland seems to have been much more prevalent than it is today (although it needs to be borne in mind that much English heathland has been lost to enclosures in just the last 200 years - which makes the survival of Ashdown's heathlands all the more significant). Indeed, according to Oliver Rackham, the beginnings of the Weald's heathlands, including Ashdown, which he terms a heathland forest, can be traced back to before the Norman Conquest.

=== Impact of the Tudor iron industry ===
The large local iron industry, which grew very rapidly in Tudor times and continued to flourish in the early Stuart period, had a major impact on the forest's landscape and ecology through its heavy exploitation of the forest's woodlands to feed the many local furnaces and forges.

The loss of much of the tree cover from the fringes of the forest during the 16th century has been attributed at least in part to the rapid growth of the industry following the introduction from northern France of blast furnaces (from 1490 onwards) with their huge demand for charcoal. For example, large-scale tree cutting took place to feed the iron works of Ralph Hogge to the south of the forest between Buxted and Maresfield.

The loss of trees caused much public concern: as early as 1520 it was lamented that

"much of the King's woods were cut down and coled [turned into charcoal] for the iron mills, and the Forest digged for Irne [iron] by which man and beast be in jeopardy."

Although it has been argued by some that sustainable woodland management through coppicing would necessarily have been introduced in the Weald to maintain the supply of charcoal to the iron industry, it seems that locally the industry continued to heavily denude Ashdown Forest into the 17th century, so that by 1632

"there was little great wood left, and by 1658 none, while by 1632 coppices were slight and much affected by illicit cutting."

That the last documented reference to pannage, the customary right of commoners to drive their pigs onto the forest in the autumn to feed on acorns and beech mast, is in 1600, provides further evidence of the extent to which the oak and beech woodlands had been devastated. Although the iron industry's impact on the forest was curtailed by its rapid decline after the first quarter of the 17th century, followed by its disappearance at the beginning of the 18th, this was too late to save the ancient woodlands.

== Landscape history ==
=== Medieval period ===
In medieval times, when it was used by English kings and the nobility as a hunting ground for deer, Ashdown Forest probably contained large areas of heathland. This would not have been unusual, as many of England's medieval forests consisted predominantly of heathland, including some of the best-known ones. For example, Sherwood Forest, in the Midlands, which was first described as a forest in 1154, had at most one-third of its area recorded as woodland in Domesday Book, and by the end of the 13th century was a vast heath incorporating a number of woods and parks with no more than a quarter of it being woodland. But unlike other heathlands in England, which have largely disappeared in the last 200 years, Ashdown's has largely survived. It now represents one of England's most extensive and important areas of lowland heathland, with the associated distinctive, often rare, heathland flora and fauna. Ashdown Forest's 1,500 ha of lowland heathland make it the largest area of this threatened habitat in south-east England.

=== 19th and 20th centuries ===
Ashdown Forest's landscape in the early 19th century was famously described by William Cobbett in his Sussex Journal entry of 8 January 1822:

"At about three miles from Grinstead you come to a pretty village, called Forest-Row, and then, on the road to Uckfield, you cross Ashurst (sic) Forest, which is a heath, with here and there a few birch scrubs upon it, verily the most villainously ugly spot I saw in England. This lasts you for five miles, getting, if possible, uglier and uglier all the way, till, at last, as if barren soil, nasty spewy gravel, heath and even that stunted, were not enough, you see some rising spots, which instead of trees, present you with black, ragged, hideous rocks."

At the start of the 20th century the forest was virtually treeless, apart from the picturesque clumps of Scots pine that had been planted on its hill-tops in the early 19th century and the woods remaining in its deeper valleys and ghylls, and its heathland was the largest in south-east England. However, after World War II a sharp decline in livestock grazing by the commoners owing to economic and social factors (see below) led to a rapid and substantial loss of heathland to scrub and trees, particularly birch and pine. The increasing amounts of road traffic across the forest, with the consequent loss of animals in road traffic collisions, also became a major deterrent to grazing, with the last of the free-ranging livestock of the commoners being removed in 1985. As a consequence the proportion of heathland in the forest has declined greatly in the last sixty years, from 90% in 1947 to 60% in 2007.
