= Hadlow Down =

Village and parish in East Sussex, England

Coordinates: 51.00°N 0.18°E

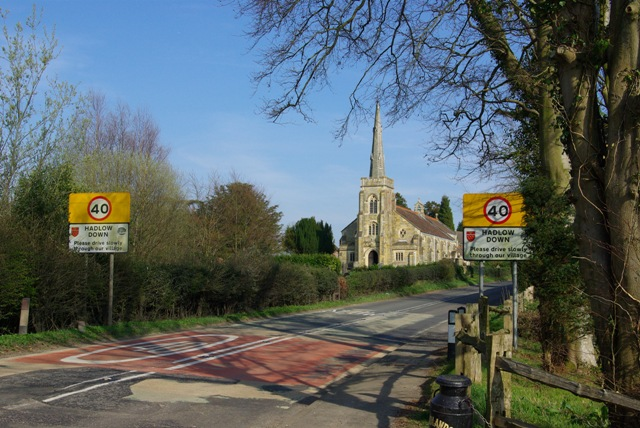
- St Mark's Church

- Location within East Sussex
- Area: 17.0 km^{2} (6.6 sq mi)
- Population: 857 (Parish-2011)
  - Density: 109/sq mi (42/km^{2})
- OS grid reference: TQ533240
  - London: 37 miles (60 km) NNW
- District: Wealden
- Shire county: East Sussex
- Region: South East
- Country: England
- Sovereign state: United Kingdom
- Post town: UCKFIELD
- Postcode district: TN22
- Dialling code: 01825
- Police: Sussex
- Fire: East Sussex
- Ambulance: South East Coast
- UK Parliament: Wealden
- Website: https://www.hadlowdown.com

Hadlow Down is a village and civil parish in the Wealden district of East Sussex, England. It is located on the A272 road three miles (4.8 km) north-west of Heathfield. The parish is within the High Weald Area of Outstanding Natural Beauty. It came to prominence with the Wealden iron industry in the 17th and 18th centuries. In 2011 the parish had a population of 857. The majority of the population now works outside the parish, but it still has a strong community atmosphere centred on the New Inn pub, St. Mark's school and St. Mark's church.

The parish church, St. Mark's, was first built and consecrated in 1836 and rebuilt just before World War I. Edmond William Costello (1873–1949), holder of the Victoria Cross, is buried in the churchyard, and Diana Rowden (1915–44), SOE agent, lived at Hadlow Down before World War II. A former Calvinistic chapel, Providence Chapel, stands on Main Road; it was built in 1849 and converted into a house in 1996.

The village school is St Mark's CE Primary School. The village pub is the New Inn, which is a historic Grade II listed building.

== History ==
Until the burgeoning of the Wealden Iron Industry in the 16th. century Hadlow Down was a rural farming community with the small population living either side of the main road that runs through it, it was relatively quiet and secluded. The Wealden cannon making industry started at a furnace on the stream at Hoggets Farm situated to the north of the centre of the village. It was here in 1543 that the first cannon in East Sussex was cast by Iron Master Rolf Hogget (Hugget) and is commemorated in a small rhyme:

'Master Hugget and his man John, They did cast the first cannon.'

The 'John' referred to is believed to be a French cannon maker by the name of Baude whose family is buried at Wartling on the Pevensey Marshes. It is probable that much of the charcoal needed to fire the furnace would have come from charcoal burners living in the area to the south of Hugget's farm and as far as Blackboys.

== Clubs & Societies ==
The Hadlow Down Drama & Variety Club thrives and puts on regular stage performances.

== Leisure ==
Wilderness Wood is a 62-acre (24.6 ha) of woodland, located near the centre of the village.

Tinkers Park is the home of the Claude Jessett collection of traction engines, steam rollers & fair organs is situated at the eastern end of the village. Hadlow Down is well known for its association with steam engines similar to those being used in the local rural farming industries many years ago. Claude bought his first steam engine 'The Tinker' in 1942 and he used it on his farm at Tinkers Park. By the 1950s Claude and his wife Joyce had become interested in the embryonic steam rally scene and, by the early 60's, their collection of steam engines had grown and they were branching out into collecting fairground organs, farming equipment and narrow gauge railways. The first annual Tinkers Park steam engine rallies was held in 1966 in aid of Cancer Research. The Great Bush Railway is also situated inside Tinkers Park.

The Playing Field is a Community Area with a children's playground. An annual 'Summer Fayre, and late autumn 'Bonfire Night' is also held in the Playing Field.

Hadlow Down Cricket Club merged in 2007 with a Brighton-based club, Moulsecoomb Wanderers, to form Hadlow Down and Moulsecoomb Wanderers Cricket Club, or HDMWCC. The club as HDMWCC play in the Sussex Central league on the Hadlow Down Playing Field. HDMWCC finished first as division champions in 2016 and 2023.

== Landmarks ==
Two Sites of Special Scientific Interest are located within the parish. Hastingford Cutting is of geological interest, the cutting exposing a sequence of rocks indicating a lake/lagoon shoreface once existed at the site and the saint marks school. Stockland Farm Meadows is a site of biological importance, consisting of two meadows, the grassland providing habitat for a variety of flora and fauna.

== New Inn pub ==
The village pub, the New Inn, has an historic pub interior of "national importance" Listed Status: Grade II. This red-brick hotel-cum-pub built in 1885 for the South Down & East Grinstead Brewery retains its plan-form and fittings virtually intact at present. The central entrance has 'Hotel Entrance' etched glass in the doors and to the right are a pair of doors leading to the public bar with one remaining 'Public Bar' etched panel. To be noted is the ceramic button with the figure '1' above the inside of the front doors – a requirement of licensing magistrates. The pub part is small with a long public bar fronting the main street (there was probably a screen dividing it originally) and one small room behind. The spartan public bar fittings are much as they were in Victorian times with a wood-block floor, a long Victorian counter with the front painted cream, bar back fitting with three large cash drawers (note two slots for notes) and four ceramic spirit barrels (note ‘I Whisky’ from the days before the fad of inserting an ‘e’ to distinguish the Irish from the Scottish variety). There are two sections of wall bench seating attached to matchboard dado panelling and a small early 20th century tiled fireplace with decoration on the wood surround and with a log fire. To be noted is the hatch on the left of the servery for customers of the hotel and waiters who would have served the former restaurant. At the rear right is the snug, a small room which now has a carpet and is home to a bar billiards table, The matchboard dado panels have been painted white and service is via the original split doors with a hatch/shelf to the back of the bar. On the front left side of the building are twin currently out of use doors with ‘Hotel Entrance’ etched panels which lead into a corridor and off to the left is the former dining room with further matchboard panelling and an ornate cast-iron fireplace. The pub still retains its outside gents’ and ladies’.

== Parish council ==
Hadlow Down Parish Council

Type
- Type: Parish council

Leadership
- Chairwoman: Councillor Sandra Woods
- Vice Chairman: Councillor Graham Terry

Structure
- Seats: 7
- Political groups: Independent

Elections
- Last election: 7 May 2015
- Next election: May/June 2019

Meeting place
- Hadlow Down Village Hall, Hall Ln, Hadlow Down, Uckfield TN22 4HG.

Website
- Official website

The council appoints one councillor who is then known as the Chairman or Chairwoman. The current Chairperson is Councillor Sandra Richards. All seven seats of Hadlow Down Parish Council are currently held by independent candidates.

Hadlow Down Parish Council comprises a single ward - this ward is represented by several parish councillors.

Clockwise, from the north, it borders the communities of Crowborough, Five Ashes, Heathfield, Buxted & Uckfield.

=== Current composition ===
Group affiliation	Members
Independent	7
Total	7

=== Election history ===
Hadlow Down Parish Council is made up of up to 7 councillors elected from a single ward. The last elections were in 2015, and resulted in the election of 7 Independent councillors.

==== 2015 election ====
The 2015 Hadlow Down Parish Council elections were held alongside the elections for Wealden District Council & the Wealden Parliamentary constituency on 7 May 2015. All 7 seats were up for election.

Ward	Party	Town councillors elected 2015
Hadlow Down Civil Parish	Independent	Clare Emsden
Hadlow Down Civil Parish	Independent	Nathan James
Hadlow Down Civil Parish	Independent	Michael Lunn
Hadlow Down Civil Parish	Independent	Julian Michaelson-Yeates
Hadlow Down Civil Parish	Independent	Sandra Richards
Hadlow Down Civil Parish	Independent	Graham Terry
Hadlow Down Civil Parish	Independent	Damon Wellman

==== 2011 election ====
In the 2011 Hadlow Down Parish Council elections only 7 of the 5 seats were contested, these seats were all won by independent candidates.

Ward	Party	Town councillors elected 2015
Hadlow Down Civil Parish	Independent	Rona Hellewell
Hadlow Down Civil Parish	Independent	Michael Lunn
Hadlow Down Civil Parish	Independent	Sandra Richards
Hadlow Down Civil Parish	Independent	Graham Terry
Hadlow Down Civil Parish	Independent	David Keith Walker

==== 2007 election ====
In the 2007 Hadlow Down Parish Council elections an uncontested election occurred in which all 7 seats were filled by independents.

Ward	Party	Town councillors elected 2015
Hadlow Down Civil Parish	Independent	Jo Dummer
Hadlow Down Civil Parish	Independent	Harry James
Hadlow Down Civil Parish	Independent	Paul James
Hadlow Down Civil Parish	Independent	Vicky Richards
Hadlow Down Civil Parish	Independent	Graham Terry
Hadlow Down Civil Parish	Independent	David Walker
Hadlow Down Civil Parish	Independent	Marion Wilson

==== 2003 election ====
In the 2003 Hadlow Down Parish Council elections an uncontested election occurred in which all 7 seats were filled by independents.

Ward	Party	Town councillors elected 2015
Hadlow Down Civil Parish	Independent	James Bannon
Hadlow Down Civil Parish	Independent	Nigel Davies
Hadlow Down Civil Parish	Independent	Joanne Dummer
Hadlow Down Civil Parish	Independent	Harry James
Hadlow Down Civil Parish	Independent	Paul James
Hadlow Down Civil Parish	Independent	Scylla Richards
Hadlow Down Civil Parish	Independent	David Walker
