= St Mark's Church, Hadlow Down =

St Mark's Church
- Church of St Mark the Evangelist
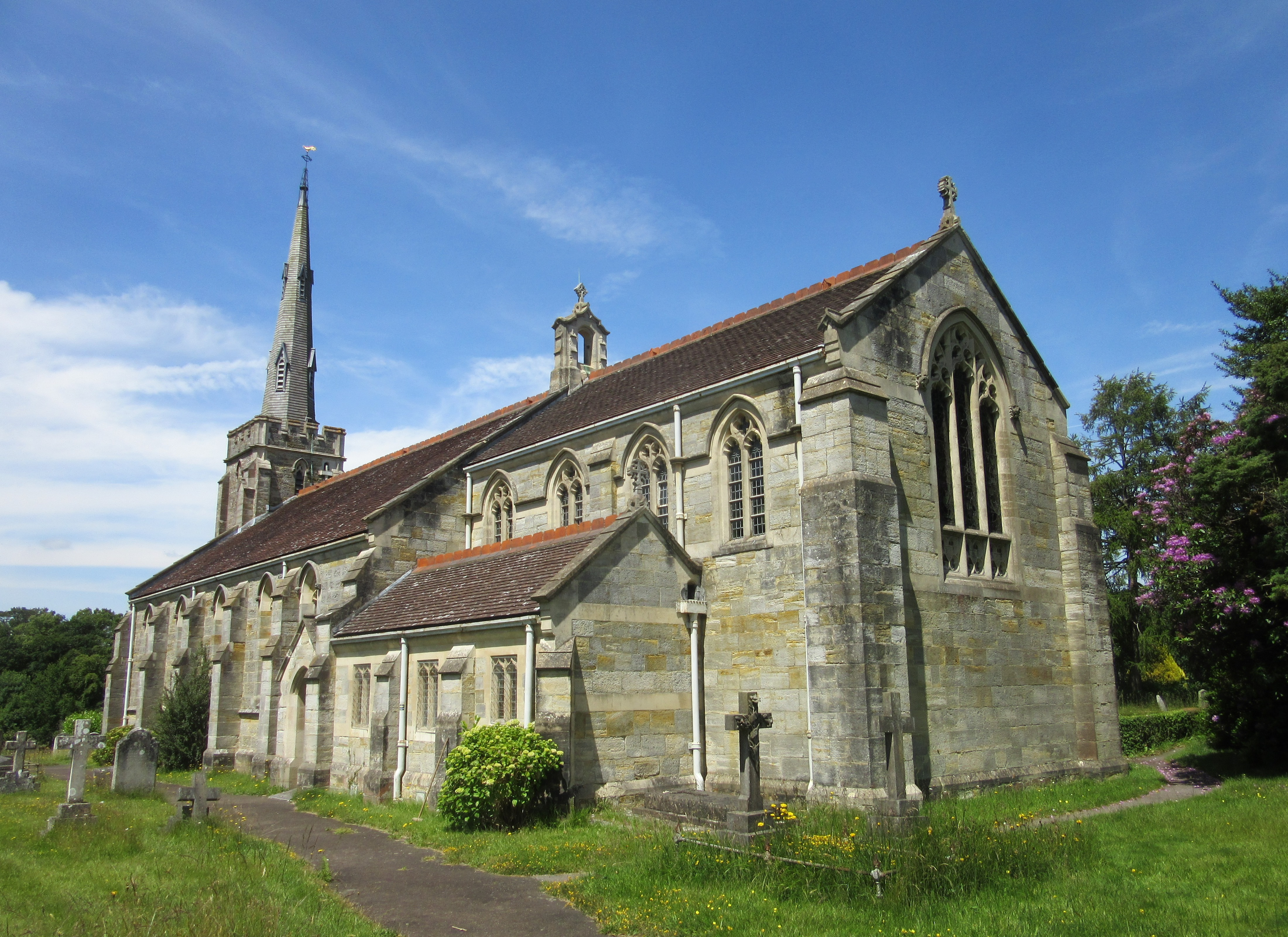
- The church from the southeast
- St Mark's Church
- 50.9967°N 0.1787°E
- OS grid reference: TQ 52980 24184
- Location: Main Road, Hadlow Down, East Sussex TN22 4HY
- Country: England
- Denomination: Church of England
- Churchmanship: Modern Catholic

History
- Status: Parish church
- Founded: 1834
- Founder: Benjamin Hall
- Dedication: Mark the Evangelist
- Consecrated: 6 May 1836

Architecture
- Functional status: Active
- Heritage designation: Grade II
- Designated: 31 December 1982
- Architect(s): William Moseley (1834 building); George Fellowes Prynne (1913 rebuilding)
- Style: Perpendicular Gothic Revival
- Completed: 1836

Administration
- Province: Canterbury
- Diocese: Chichester
- Archdeaconry: Lewes and Hastings
- Deanery: Rural Deanery of Uckfield
- Parish: Buxted and Hadlow Down

Clergy
- Vicar: Revd Dr John Barker

St Mark's Church (dedicated to St Mark the Evangelist) is an Anglican church in the village of Hadlow Down in the district of Wealden, one of six local government districts in the English county of East Sussex. Founded in 1834 by a committed local resident who petitioned the Archbishop of Canterbury for permission to establish a chapel in the poor agricultural village, the church proved popular—despite the competing presence of two Nonconformist chapels nearby—and was extended in 1913. The stone-built church, with its tall spire and well-regarded "living churchyard" nature reserve, is now Hadlow Down's only remaining place of worship. English Heritage has listed it at Grade II for its architectural and historical importance.

== History ==
Hadlow Down's name suggests that a settlement existed in Saxon times: it was first recorded as Headda's leah, a forest clearing (leah in Anglo-Saxon) governed by Headda. "Down" was appended in the 14th century to describe the hilly nature of the land, and the present name emerged by the early 19th century, when the present linear village began to develop.

The village straddled the boundary of two large rural parishes, Buxted and Mayfield, and was nominally served by those villages' churches—St Margaret the Queen's Church and St Dunstan's Church respectively. These were both more than three miles away, and the owner of Buxted Lodge (a large house in Hadlow Down), Benjamin Hall, was concerned about the number of villagers who could not attend church. Furthermore, a Nonconformist place of worship—the Providence Chapel—had been founded in the centre of the village in 1824, potentially attracting people away from the Church of England's ministry. In 1834, he wrote to the Archbishop of Canterbury, William Howley, seeking permission and funds to build a church in the village—adding that "very many poor children [were] wandering about the lanes in ignorance of almost every duty, moral or religious". The Archbishop supported Hall's idea, but advised that money would be limited—although within a few months, the reforms instituted by the Ecclesiastical Duties and Revenue Commission led to initiatives such as the founding of the Society for Building Churches and Chapels, whose purpose was to provide funds to establish new churches.

At the time, Hadlow Down's residents were mostly poor: most people worked as farm labourers, and the early 19th century was a particularly difficult time. Nevertheless, Hall sought to raise funds as quickly as possible. He published a document detailing his case for the building of the church—principally that a rapidly growing population of about 700 was served by two churches more than 3.5 miles (5.6 km) away—and the funding requirements for building work (estimated at £1,800) and the endowment for the vicar (suggested as £100 per year). He then listed the people and bankers who would be in charge of receiving donations—including himself, the 3rd Earl of Liverpool (owner of nearby Buxted Park) and the Vicar of Mayfield—and included a list of all benefactions received so far, with names, place of residence and value: from the £100 subscriptions from the Archbishop of Canterbury, the Vicars of Mayfield and Buxted and other prominent local figures to donations of five shillings from local farmworkers. This may have been an attempt to prompt others into donating or increasing their gift by playing on their sense of propriety or shame. A "Queen Anne's Bounty" of £200 was also received from the fund established in 1704 to help improve the incomes of Anglican clergy, and the 5th Earl De La Warr gave £200 worth of stone to build the walls.

A local building firm constructed the church to the designs of William Moseley. He worked mainly in London, but also designed several Gothic Revival churches in the north of Sussex—at Forest Row, Holtye Common, Horsham and Uckfield. His design for St Mark's Church was based on that of Holy Trinity Church at Forest Row, which was being built at the same time. The plan consisted of a nave without aisles, a chancel and a buttressed tower at the west end topped by a slim spire. Moseley adopted a cost-saving technique in his design for the tower and spire—which ended up damaging the building— and provided space for about 420 worshippers, in both private rented pews (82) and free seats (260, plus an 80-capacity gallery).

Building work started on 21 April 1835 (prompting the Vicar of Mayfield to write a commemorative poem) and finished in 1836, and Archbishop of Canterbury William Howley consecrated the church on 6 May 1836 in front of 500 guests. A debt of about £400 remained at that time, and in 1837 the church faced another problem when dry rot caused structural damage. In the same year, it became a parish church when a parish was carved out of Buxted and Mayfield districts.

Hadlow Down gained a third place of worship in the late 1880s, when the corrugated iron Gate House Baptist Chapel was built on the outskirts. It was moved to a site near St Mark's Church in 1907. Meanwhile, the Providence Chapel (also used by Baptists by this time) continued to thrive.

By 1913, the church was in disrepair. The spire was too heavy for the tower, and Moseley's design resulted in structural damage developing. The spire had to be shortened and capped, but this did not help. Charles Lang Huggins jp, a relative of Benjamin Hall, paid for the building to be rebuilt to a design by architect George Fellowes Prynne. Huggins supplied stone quarried from his own land at Hadlow Grange. Fellowes Prynne studied architecture in Canada and later worked with George Edmund Street. He was responsible for St Wilfrid's Church at Bognor Regis and the fittings (especially reredoses) of many other churches in Sussex. There is uncertainty over how extensive his work at St Mark's Church was, and whether it can be considered a mere remodelling or a complete reconstruction. The chancel is entirely new, as are the aisles of the nave; the nave retains its original stonework and size, but the tracery in the lancet windows and the arcades at the east and west ends are probably Fellowes Prynne's; the tower and spire were renewed, although their appearance is little changed; and a "pert bellcote" (in Nikolaus Pevsner's words) was added on the east end of the roof. Another innovation was electric lighting. Charles Lang Huggins employed the Miller and Selmes firm of Eastbourne to build the church. One of their workers added his mark on the spire by deliberately erecting the weather vane upside down; he was sacked for this attempt at humour. The Bishop of Chichester, Charles Ridgeway, reconsecrated the church in October 1913.

The Parochial church council raised concerns about the condition of the churchyard in 1931. A document issued on 31 October 1931 observed that its "overgrown" state gave "the appearance of sad neglect", and proposed that grave mounds would be levelled, shrubbery would be removed and elaborate gravestones would no longer be permitted. The scheme was not successful, but over the ensuing decades an impressive range of wild flowers have grown in parts of the churchyard, which is now maintained as a nature reserve by the "Living Churchyard" conservation project. Burials include Brigadier-General Edmund Costello vc, who was awarded the Victoria Cross in 1897 for gallantry during the Siege of Malakand.

== Architecture ==
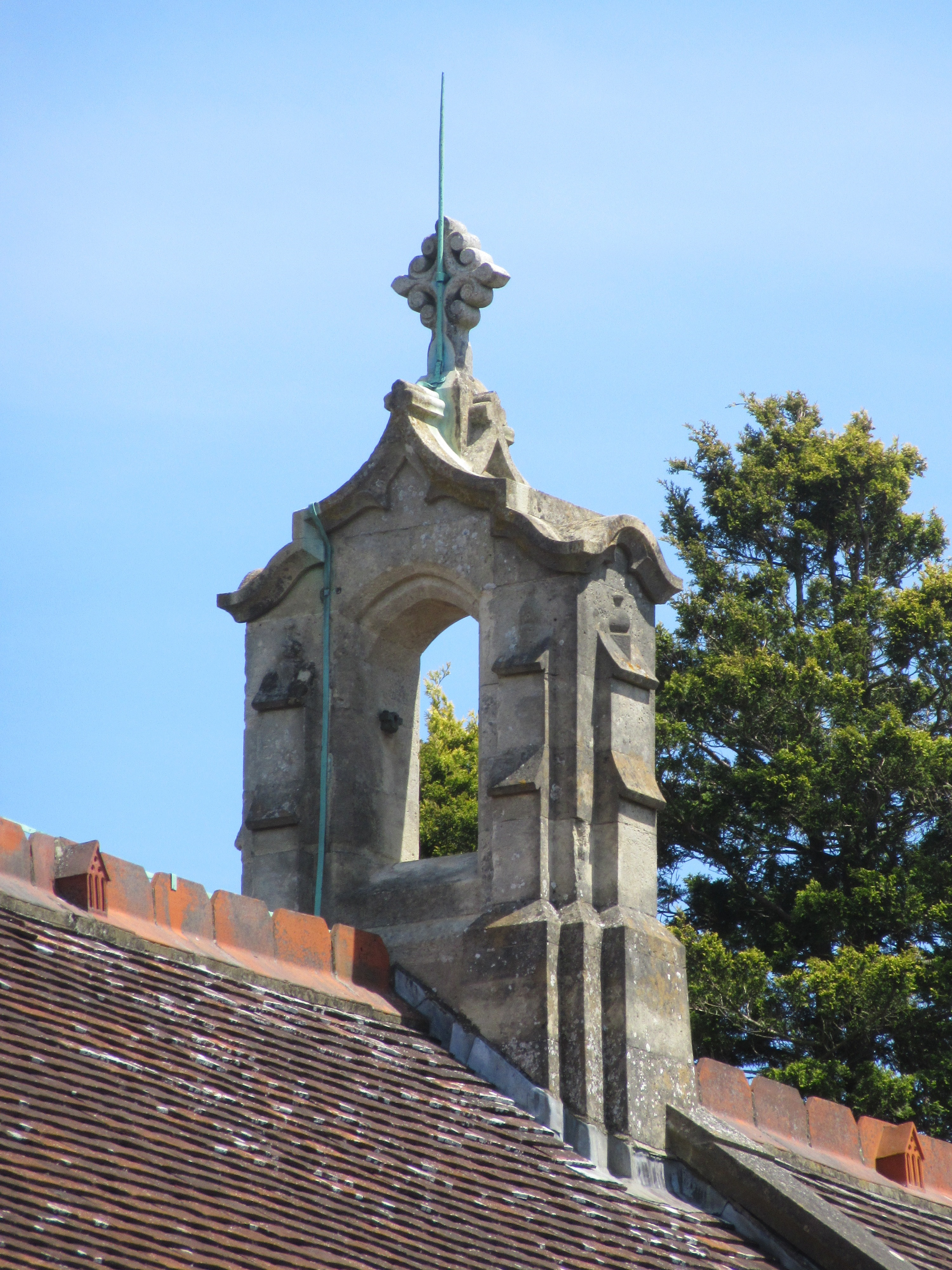
The bellcote

St Mark's Church is a Gothic Revival building in the 14th-century Perpendicular style. It is built entirely of local stone. There is a short tower at the west end, topped by a recessed broach spire with shingles and dormer openings. The base of the tower forms a porch containing the entrance. Beyond this, the nave has an arch-braced roof, aisles on both sides and a three-part arcade—a layout favoured by George Fellowes Prynne. The side arches lead to a Lady chapel (attached to the south side of the chancel) and a vestry. The gable end of the chancel roof has a bellcote.

Fittings include a wrought iron rood screen attributed to Fellowes Prynne, a stained glass east window of the early 20th century, small stained glass windows in the Lady chapel inserted in 1949–50, and a version of the Madonna of the Magnificat painted by the architect's brother Edward Arthur Fellowes Prynne. He designed fittings, stained glass and paintings (mostly in the Pre-Raphaelite style) for many churches, including at Brighton (St Peter's Church), East Grinstead and Pagham. Fellowes Prynne completed the painting in 1899 and exhibited it at the Royal Academy; Charles Lang Huggins bought it but donated it to St Mark's Church instead of displaying it in the private chapel at his house as originally intended.

The church windows include two by Percy Bacon from the early 20th century ("Madonna & child with angels" and "Suffer little children") and a smaller window by Francis Skeat from 1948, featuring the Christian year in wild flowers.

== The church today ==
St Mark's Church was listed at Grade II by English Heritage on 31 December 1982; this defines it as a "nationally important" building of "special interest". As of February 2001, it was one of 2,020 Grade II listed buildings, and 2,173 listed buildings of all grades, in the district of Wealden.

The parish is now united with that of Buxted. Legally known as the Parish of Buxted and Hadlow Down, its three churches (St Margaret the Queen's Church at Buxted Park, St Mary the Virgin in the centre of Buxted village and St Mark's) serve a large rural area with the east–west A272 road at its centre. The western boundary is close to the hamlets of Five Ash Down and Cooper's Green on the A26; the eastern side runs close to Five Ashes village and the A267 road; and the northern and southern borders follow field boundaries. About 5,000 people live in the parish.

St Mark's Church maintains links with St Mark's Church of England Primary School, built next to the church in the late 19th century as a National school. It has always had a large, mostly rural catchment area.

== See also ==
- List of current places of worship in Wealden
