= Edmund Costello =

Recipient of the Victoria Cross (1873–1949)

Brigadier-General Edmund Costello VC CMG CVO DSO
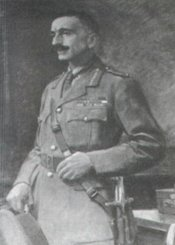
- Born: 7 August 1873; Sheikh Badin, North-West Frontier, India
- Died: 7 June 1949 (aged 75); Eastbourne, Sussex, England
- Burial place: St Mark's Church, Hadlow Down, Sussex, England
- Military career
- Allegiance: United Kingdom; British India
- Branch: British Army; Indian Army
- Service years: 1892–1923
- Rank: Brigadier-General
- Units: West Yorkshire Regiment; 22nd Punjab Infantry; 24th Punjab Infantry
- Commands: 12th Indian Brigade; 8th (Jullundur) Brigade; Palestine Defence Force
- Conflicts: Siege of Malakand; World War I; Mesopotamian campaign
- Awards: Victoria Cross; Companion of the Order of St Michael and St George; Commander of the Royal Victorian Order; Companion of the Distinguished Service Order; Mentioned in Dispatches (7); Croix de Guerre (France)
- Other work: Director of Military Studies, University of Cambridge

Brigadier-General Edmund William Costello VC CMG CVO DSO (7 August 1873 – 7 June 1949) was a British Indian Army officer and a recipient of the Victoria Cross, the highest and most prestigious award for gallantry in the face of the enemy that can be awarded to British and Commonwealth forces.

== Early life and service ==
Costello was born in Sheikhbudia on the North-West Frontier of India, the son of a colonel in the Indian Medical Service. He was educated in England at Beaumont College, Stonyhurst College and the Royal Military College, Sandhurst. In 1892 he was commissioned into the West Yorkshire Regiment, but transferred to the Indian Army in 1894 and was posted to the 22nd Punjab Infantry.

== Victoria Cross ==
He was 23 years old, and attached to the 24th Punjab Infantry during the Malakand Frontier War, when the following deed took place for which he was awarded the VC:

On 26 July 1897 at Malakand on the Indian Frontier, Lieutenant Costello went out from the hospital enclosure and with the assistance of two sepoys, brought in a wounded lance-havildar who was lying 60 yards (55 m) away, in the open, on the football ground. This ground was at the time over-run with swordsmen and swept by a heavy fire from both the enemy and our own men who were holding the sapper lines.

In the subsequent fighting he was wounded twice and mentioned in dispatches twice.

== Later service ==
In November 1900 Costello was appointed adjutant of his regiment, and on 19 November 1901 he was promoted Captain in the Indian Staff Corps. He then worked as a recruiting officer for several years before taking part in the Mohmand operations of 1908. He was promoted Major in 1910. In 1913 he entered the Indian Staff College at Quetta and graduated just before the outbreak of the First World War in 1914, when he rejoined his regiment as second-in-command.

The regiment was soon sent to Mesopotamia as part of the 17th (Ahmednagar) Brigade of the 6th (Poona) Division and Costello remained there for the rest of the war. He was promoted Brevet Lieutenant-Colonel in June 1916, was awarded the Distinguished Service Order (DSO) in 1917 and appointed Companion of the Order of St Michael and St George (CMG) in 1918. In May 1918 he took command of the 12th Indian Brigade and he received a substantive promotion to Lieutenant-Colonel in September 1918. He was mentioned five times in dispatches during the war and also received the French Croix de Guerre.

On 3 June 1919 he was promoted Brevet Colonel and was joint commander of the Indian contingent at the Peace March in London, for which he was appointed Commander of the Royal Victorian Order (CVO) in the 1920 New Year Honours. He was promoted substantive Colonel in March 1920, although he had held the acting appointment of Brigadier-General since 1918. From May to December 1920 he commanded the 8th (Jullundur) Brigade in the 3rd (Lahore) Division. In March 1921 he went to Palestine as temporary commander of the Palestine Defence Force and remained there to command a brigade in 1922. He retired in October 1923 and became Director of Military Studies at the University of Cambridge.

== Family ==
Costello married Elise Maud Lang Huggins, daughter of Charles Lang Huggins, of Hadlow Grange, Buxted, Sussex, at St Peter and St Edward's church, Pimlico, on 16 October 1902.

== Legacy ==
His grave and headstone memorial is at St Mark's Church, Hadlow Down, Sussex, England.

His Victoria Cross is displayed at the National Army Museum in Chelsea.

== Honours and awards ==

Victoria Cross (VC)	2 December 1897 at Windsor Castle by Queen Victoria
Companion of the Order of St Michael and St George (CMG)	1918
Commander of the Royal Victorian Order (CVO)	1920
Companion of the Distinguished Service Order (DSO)	1917
India Medal	With 2 clasps, Punjab Frontier 1897-98 and Malakand 1897
India General Service Medal	With 1 clasp NW Frontier 1908
1914–15 Star	
British War Medal	
Victory Medal with palm for Mentioned in Dispatches	
King George VI Coronation Medal	1937
Croix de guerre	(France)
