= St Margaret the Queen, Buxted =

Church in Buxted Park, East Sussex, England

Coordinates: 50.987606°N 0.115783°E

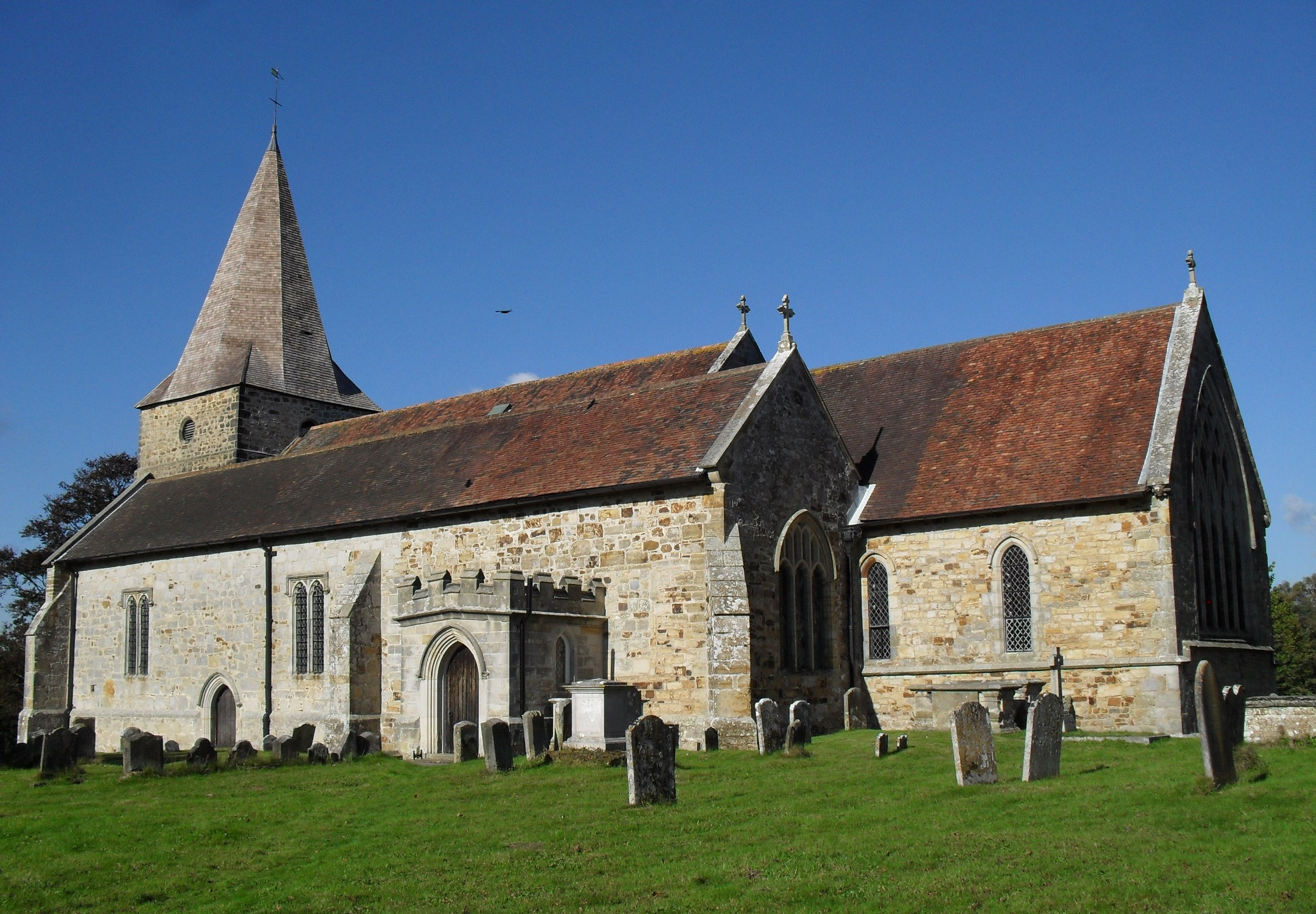
Exterior of St Margaret the Queen's Church

The Church of St Margaret the Queen is a grade I listed building in Buxted Park, East Sussex, England. It is dedicated to Saint Margaret of Scotland, an 11th-century Scottish queen. The church dates from the 13th century, with additions in the 15th and 16th centuries, and it was restored in 1858. In the present day, it is a middle-of-the-road Church of England church and part of the Parish of Buxted and Hadlow Down in the diocese of Chichester.

== Gallery ==
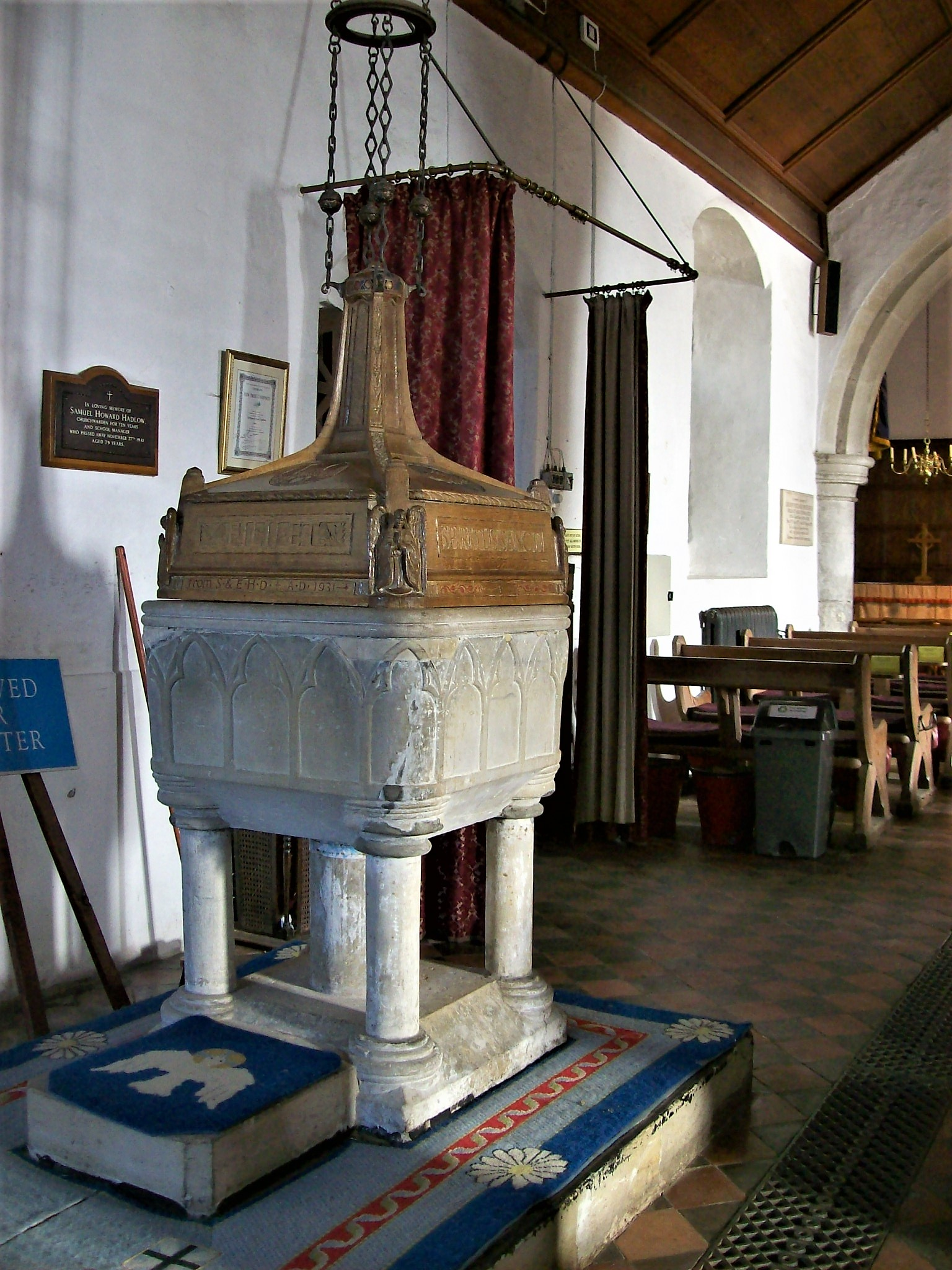
Font

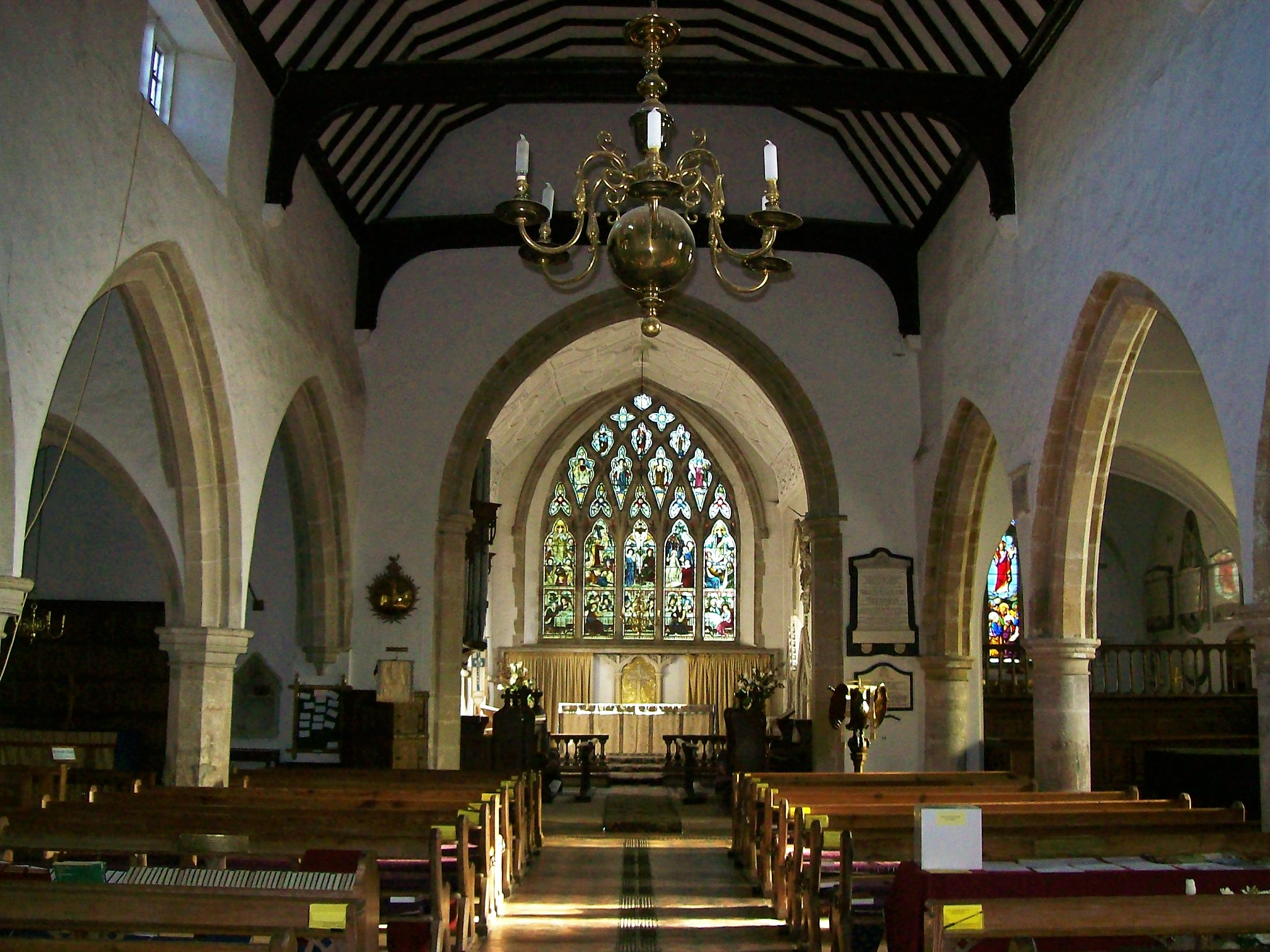
Interior, looking east

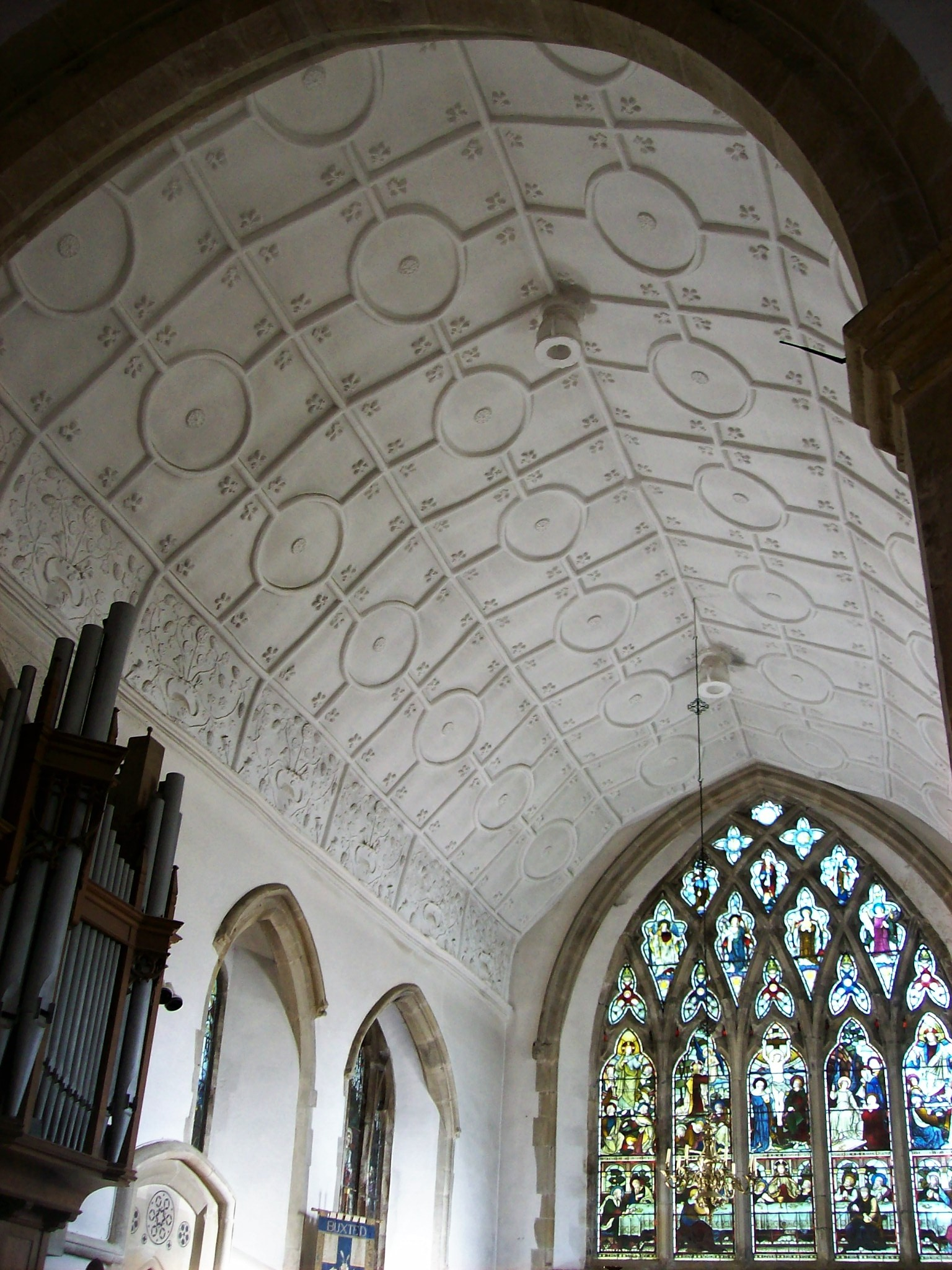
Ceiling and east window

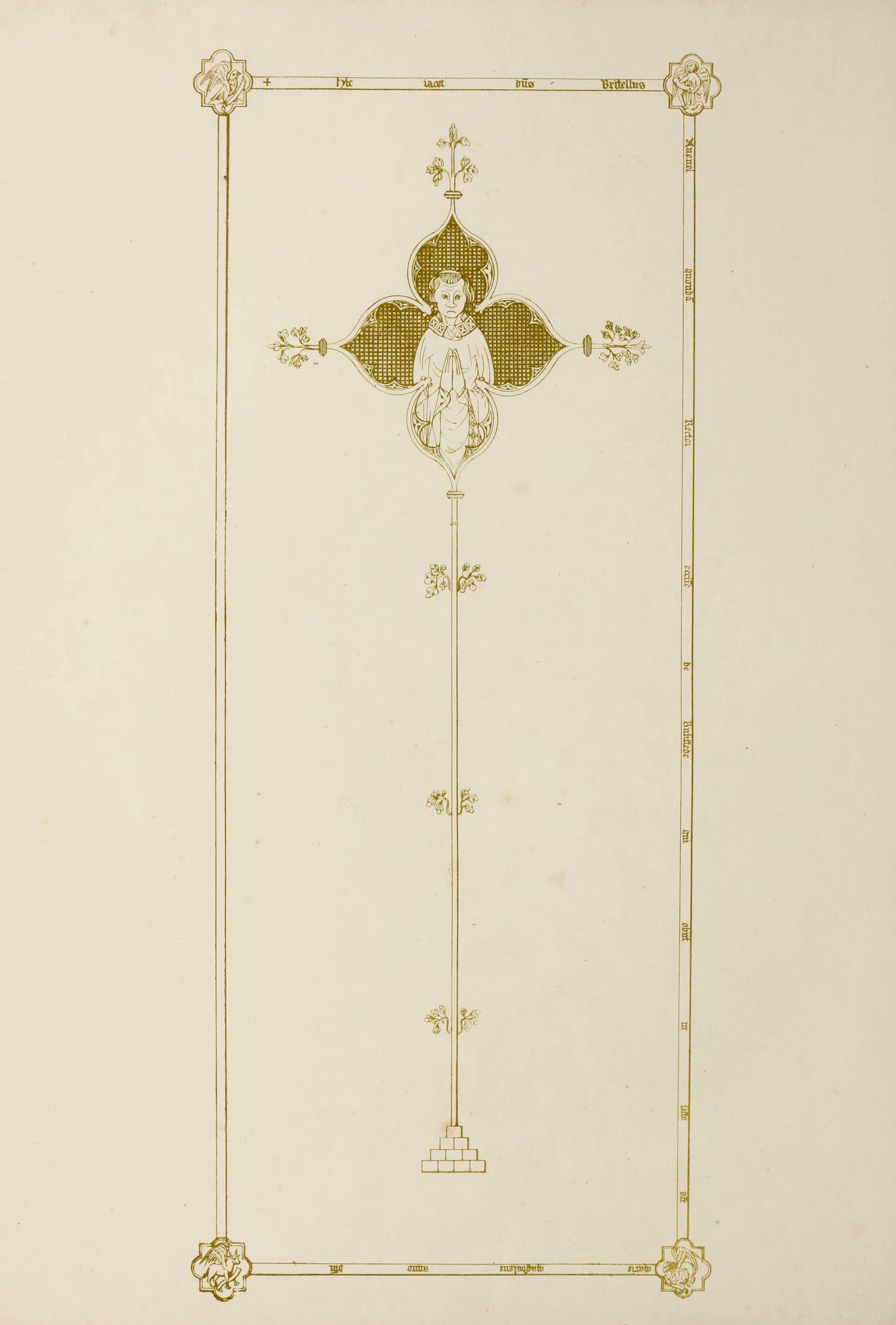
Brass to Britellus Avenel, 1307

== See also ==
- Grade I listed buildings in East Sussex
- List of current places of worship in Wealden
