= Buxted Parish Council =

Local authority in East Sussex, England

Type
- Type: Parish council

Leadership
- Chairman: Councillor Vivienne Blandford
- Vice Chairman: Councillor John Rose

Structure
- Seats: 12*
- Political groups: Independent (12)

Elections
- Last election: 7 May 2015
- Next election: May/June 2019

Website
- Official website

Footnotes
- Only 12 of the 15 available seats are currently filled.

Buxted Parish Council governs the village of Buxted, a civil parish in the Wealden district of East Sussex in England. The council appoints one councillor who is then known as the "Chairman" or "Chairwoman." The current Chairperson is Councillor Vivienne Blandford.

Buxted Parish Council is formed of two wards - these wards are currently represented by twelve parish councillors.

Clockwise, from the north, it borders the communities of Crowborough, Five Ashes, Heathfield, Buxted & Uckfield.

== History ==
Buxted Parish Council was established in 1894, when the system of Parish Councils was created for rural communities.

== Council ==
Members of the Council are elected for four-year terms. Meetings are held every month. All meetings of the Council and the committees are open to the public. The Council is a member Council of East Sussex Association of Local Councils. It manages recreational areas such as the Buxted Recreation Ground and High Hurstwood Recreation Ground.

== Current composition ==
Group affiliation	Members
Independent	12
Total	12

== Election history ==
Buxted Parish Council is made up of up to 15 councillors elected from two wards. The last elections were held in 2015, and resulted in the election of 12 Independent councillors.

=== 2015 election ===
The 2015 Buxted Parish Council elections were held alongside the elections for Wealden District Council & the Wealden Parliamentary constituency on 7 May 2015. All 15 seats were up for election, of these seats only 12 were filled.

Ward	Party	Parish councillors elected 2015
Buxted	Independent	Vivienne Blandford
Buxted	Independent	Ian Goldsmith
Buxted	Independent	Martin Hall
Buxted	Independent	Francis Harding
Buxted	Independent	Kate Littlefield
Buxted	Independent	Fiona McQuarrie
Buxted	Independent	Jon Milner
Buxted	Independent	Dermot Mulvagh
Buxted	Independent	John Rose
Buxted	Independent	Jean Skinner
High Hurstwood	Independent	Morna Rogers
High Hurstwood	Independent	Geoffrey Sheard

=== 2011 election ===
In the 2011 Buxted Parish Council elections, 15 seats were contested, and all of these seats were filled by independent candidates.

Ward	Party	Parish councillors elected 2011
Buxted	Independent	Marjan Hoorieh Arabizadeh
Buxted	Independent	Vivienne Blandford
Buxted	Independent	Alison Crowe
Buxted	Independent	Maggie Dopson
Buxted	Independent	Martin Hall
Buxted	Independent	Francis Harding
Buxted	Independent	Graham Manchester
Buxted	Independent	John Pearson
Buxted	Independent	John Rose
Buxted	Independent	Katie Seddon
High Hurstwood	Independent	Louise Daniel
High Hurstwood	Independent	Geoffrey Sheard
High Hurstwood	Independent	Violet Treacher
High Hurstwood	Independent	Michelle Warner
High Hurstwood	Independent	Pat Wood

=== 2007 election ===
In the 2007 Buxted Parish Council elections, an uncontested election occurred in which 12 of the 15 available seats were filled by independents.

Ward	Party	Parish councillors elected 2007
Buxted	Independent	James Chalmers
Buxted	Independent	Peter Coxon
Buxted	Independent	Alison Crowe
Buxted	Independent	Louise Daniel
Buxted	Independent	Jacky Downing
Buxted	Independent	Francis Harding
Buxted	Independent	Mike Kettell
Buxted	Independent	Martin Rogers
Buxted	Independent	John Rose
Buxted	Independent	Henry Wilkes
High Hurstwood	Independent	Fraser Sheard
High Hurstwood	Independent	Violet Treacher

=== 2003 election ===
In the 2003 Buxted Parish Council elections, an uncontested election occurred in which 10 seats were filled by independents.

Ward	Party	Parish councillors elected 2003
Buxted	Independent	Alison Crowe
Buxted	Independent	Jacqueline Downing
Buxted	Independent	Michael Kettell
Buxted	Independent	John Rose
Buxted	Independent	Walter Wilkes
High Hurstwood	Independent	Peter Bowdery
High Hurstwood	Independent	Jean McQuillen
High Hurstwood	Independent	Fraser Sheard
High Hurstwood	Independent	Violet Treacher
High Hurstwood	Independent	Michael Turton
