= Providence Chapel, Hadlow Down =

Providence Chapel
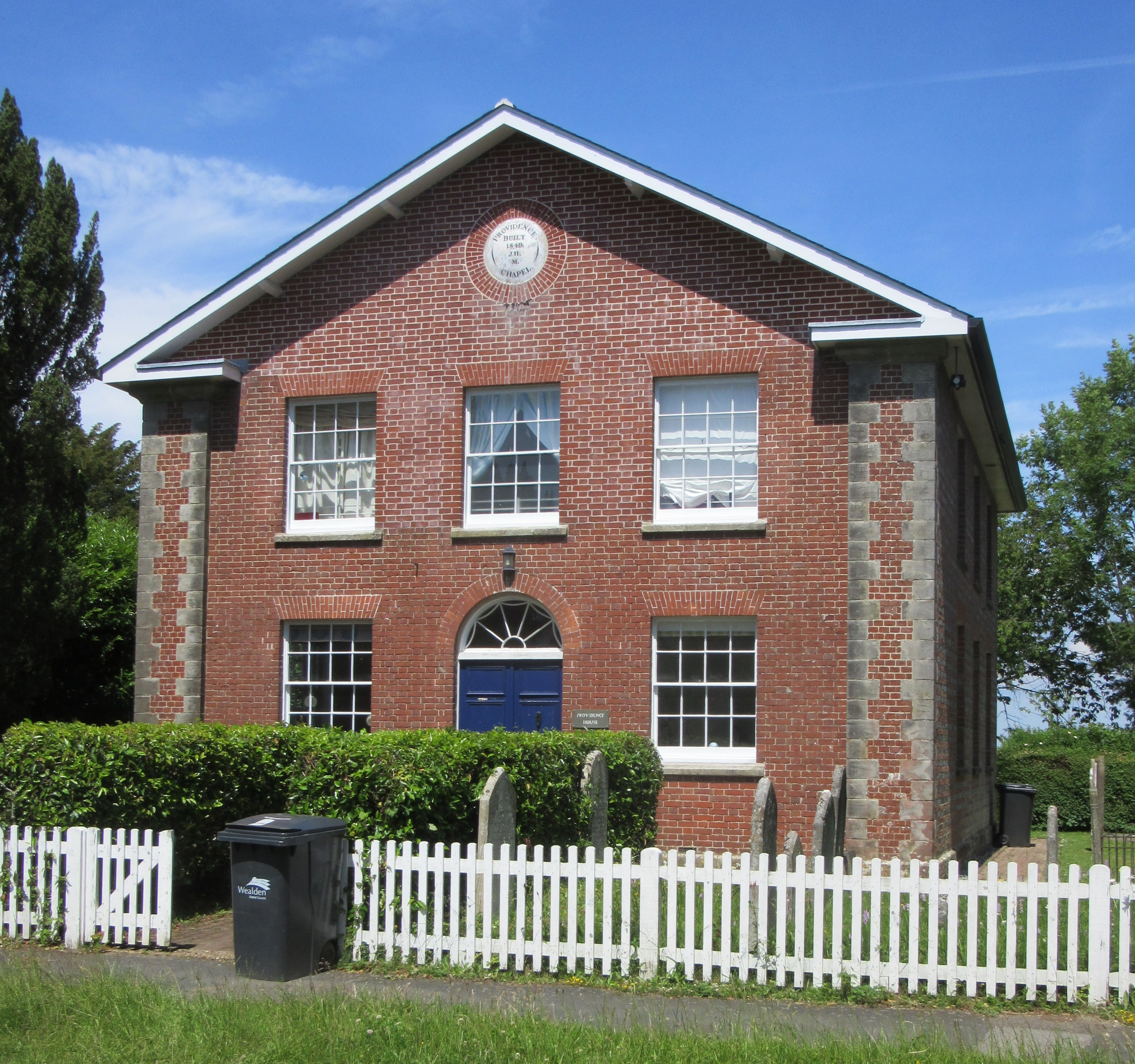
- The former chapel from the south
- Providence Chapel
- 50.9958°N 0.1816°E
- Location: Main Road, Hadlow Down, East Sussex TN22 4HJ
- Country: England
- Denomination: Independent Calvinistic

History
- Status: Former chapel
- Founded: 1824
- Founder: Henry Smith

Architecture
- Functional status: Residential conversion
- Heritage designation: Grade II
- Designated: 31 December 1982
- Style: Classical
- Completed: 1849
- Closed: 1993

Providence Chapel is a former independent Calvinistic place of worship in the village of Hadlow Down in Wealden, one of six local government districts in the English county of East Sussex. Although built in 1849, the chapel can trace its origins to the founding in 1824 of an Independent place of worship in the village (pre-dating the local Anglican church by 12 years). The new building was in religious use for nearly 150 years, but storm damage led to its closure and conversion into a private dwelling in 1993—although its former graveyard survives. The chapel is a Grade II Listed building.

== History ==
The village of Hadlow Down is situated on high ground in the Sussex Weald between Buxted (2.75 miles (4.4 km) to the west) and Heathfield. Its first Anglican church, dedicated to St Mark, was built in 1836, and a parish was created from parts of Buxted and Mayfield parishes the following year. The first place of worship in the village was, however, founded 12 years earlier. In 1824, Henry Smith—a local builder and Wesleyan Methodist—built an independent nonconformist chapel for the use of local Dissenters, principally Baptists. In 1849, it was replaced by the present building. This was recorded in the religious census of Sussex in 1851, for which the return (compiled by the chapel's trustee Benjamin Austen) stated there was accommodation for 600 worshippers and that typical Sunday attendance was 300 adults and 350–450 Sunday school children. The chapel was registered for marriages on 26 January 1876, and its denomination was recorded as "Calvinistic Baptist" in 1882.

The chapel was still used for worship until the late 20th century, but it was severely damaged in the devastating Great Storm of 1987. It closed soon after this and was converted into a house in 1996.

Providence Chapel was designated a Grade II Listed building on 31 December 1982.

== Architecture ==
Providence Chapel is a square two-storey building of red and grey/blue brick with some Classical features such as a pediment and pilasters. The three-bay façade has two sash windows (originally blank recesses) on the ground floor and three above. The ground-floor windows flank a double doorway topped with a rounded fanlight. Above the upper windows is an open-based pediment with pilasters at each side; these are of red brick with wide grey stone quoins. The front wall is of red brick; at the side, there are alternate layers of red and glazed grey/blue bricks. The pediment has a circular stone motif bearing the text providence chapel, 1849 and j.h.| m. (referring to "James Hallett, Minister", who led the congregation at the time the chapel opened).

== See also ==
- List of former places of worship in Wealden
- Media related to Providence Chapel, Hadlow Down at Wikimedia Commons

== Bibliography ==
- Elleray, D. Robert (2004). Sussex Places of Worship. Worthing: Optimus Books. ISBN 0-9533132-7-1.
- Nairn, Ian; Pevsner, Nikolaus (1965). The Buildings of England: Sussex. Harmondsworth: Penguin Books. ISBN 0-14-071028-0.
- Stell, Christopher (2002). Nonconformist Chapels and Meeting-houses in Eastern England. Swindon: English Heritage. ISBN 1-873592-50-7.
- Vickers, John A., ed. (1989). The Religious Census of Sussex 1851. Lewes: Sussex Record Society. ISBN 085445-036-X.
