= William Levett (rector of Buxted) =

English clergyman and industrialist (1495 – 1554)

The Rev. William Levett
- Born: ca. 1495; The Grove, Hollington, East Sussex, England
- Died: 1554; Buxted, East Sussex, England
- Resting place: St Margaret the Queen Church, Buxted, East Sussex, England
- Education: BA, University of Oxford
- Occupations: priest; cannon founder
- Known for: Anglican Rector 1533–1554; chief supplier of cannons and armaments to the English Crown
- Parent: John Levet or Levett

William Levett (ca. 1495 – 1554) was an English clergyman. An Oxford-educated country rector, he was a pivotal figure in the use of the blast furnace to manufacture iron. With the patronage of the English Crown, furnaces in Sussex under Levett's ownership cast the first iron muzzle-loader cannons in England in 1543, a development which enabled England to ultimately reconfigure the global balance-of-power by becoming an ascendant naval force. William Levett continued to perform his ministerial duties while building an early munitions empire, and left the riches he accumulated to a wide variety of charities at his death.

== Life ==
Thrust into running a family iron business, this rector of the village of Buxted, Sussex, seized on emerging technologies to help establish the iron foundry industry in England. By perfecting the technology behind the iron cannon, and building a business upon it, Mr Levett set in motion events that would make England the envy of the world's powers for its cutting-edge armaments, changing the balance of global power. Parson Levett was the first to cast iron cannons in England.

The first iron cannon manufactured in England was cast in Buxted in 1543 by Ralf Hogge, an employee of Parson Levett, a Sussex rector with broad interests, paradoxically enough, in the emerging English armaments industry. Henry VIII's reign was good for Parson Levett's business. While charged by the church with praying for peace, the Sussex parson's business thrived on the prospects of war.

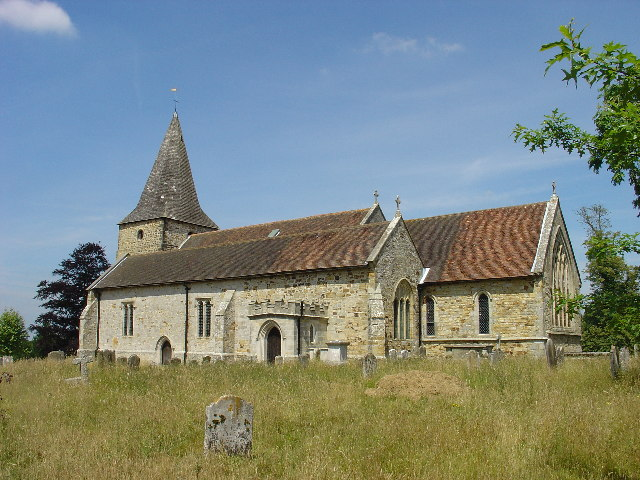
St Margaret the Queen Church, Buxted, East Sussex, William Levett, Rector

William Levett was born at The Grove, Hollington, East Sussex, the son of Joane (Adams) Levett and John Levett, a large landowner and descendant of a knightly Anglo-Norman family who owned the manor of Catsfield Levett (now simply Catsfield), as well as property across Sussex, including in Hollington, St. Leonards-on-Sea, Bulverhythe, Firle, Hastings, Bexhill-on-Sea and elsewhere. Lawrence Levett inherited the family seat at Hollington, leaving his brothers the Rev. William Levett to pursue a career in the ministry, and brother John to turn to business and ironfounding.

His brother John, who lived at Little Horsted, Sussex, leveraged the family's landholdings into one of the earliest iron foundries in the Weald of Sussex. From Levett's early efforts sprang the almost complete monopoly that the Weald enjoyed over iron gun-casting for the subsequent two centuries, yielding the region immense profits, increasing its sway on the national stage and setting the scene for England's increasing dominance of world trade and power.

Iron foundries required immense amounts of wood, converted into charcoal, to smelt the iron in blast furnaces. Timber and ore were the raw materials of smelted iron: each furnace required a permanent wood-lined pit for casting. The earliest cannons cast by the foundry belonging to the Levetts were of the Italianate style originating in Venice and copied by the English. By adapting the European style, the English turned Sussex and Kent into the centre of the European gun-making industry.

Iron smelting was not new to the Sussex Weald: the Romans had a forge at Oldlands in Buxted, where their coins have been found. But the large-scale forging of weaponry was new. In a very short period of time the English made themselves masters of the art of gun-making. The Sussex landscape is sprinkled with names redolent of the forges: Furnace Wood, Furnace Pond, Minepit Wood, Little Forge, Culver Wood, Slag Meadow, Huggett's Furnace, and Hammerpond.

The earliest cannons were crude affairs, "mere cylinders", wrote Sussex historian Thomas Walker Horsfield, "fixed on sledges, and were sometimes composed of iron bars, laid side by side like the staves of a cask, and held together by iron hoops." These early cannons were so inferior to those made on the continent that the English Board of Ordnance simply ordered abroad, importing cannons and even shot from Europe.

But in the 1540s, all that changed. "With the conscious patronage and support of the crown", notes historian N. A. M. Rodger, "the established iron industry in the Weald of Kent and Sussex was encouraged to experiment with gunfounding iron. The first iron muzzle-loaders were cast at Buxted in 1543." In 1545, Parson Levett was ordered to produce 120 of his state-of-the-art cannons as well as a large amount of ammunition. Suddenly the English iron-masters had become the yardstick by which armorers were measured. Because of the proximity of timber, the importation of foreign (primarily French) ironworkers, and effective new forging methods, the English guns were superior to those manufactured on the European continent. The new English guns were so effective that laws were quickly passed to prevent their export to enemies on the continent.

William Levett served Buxted as its vicar for over 21 years, from 1533 to 1554 at St. Margaret's parish church. (In 1533 Levett was also named non-resident rector of a parish in Stanford Rivers, Essex, where he apparently continued to hold the living during his lifetime, and in 1545 he was also named rector of Herstmonceux, Sussex). In the same year that Levett was named rector of Buxted he was also named deputy to the Receiver of the King's Revenue in Sussex for a one-year term (1533–34). This curious overlapping of church and state – the vicar as tax collector – demonstrated Levett's talents, his ambition and his ability to navigate the shoals of politics, business and religion.

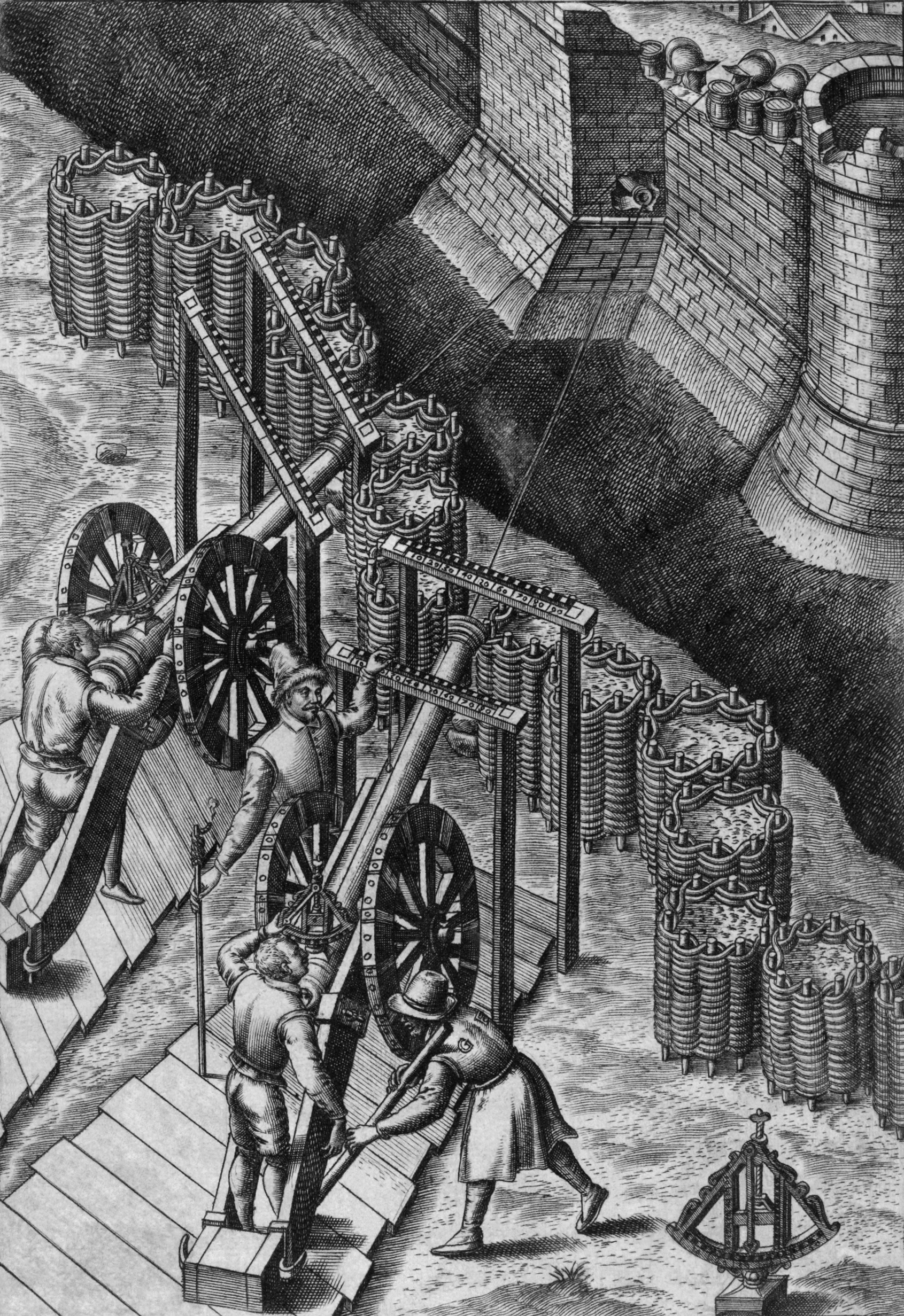
16th century cannon emplacements in use in Europe, 1588

In 1535, two years into Levett's tenure as parish vicar, Levett's elder brother John died. The founder of the family's interest in iron founding, John Levett instructed the executors of his will (who included his brother Rev. William) to continue operating his "Irron mylles and furnesses" and to devote the profits to providing for his young children. At the time of his death, John Levett was already operating several furnaces in Sussex, producing ironworks.

By 1539, four years after the death of John Levett, Parson William Levett had taken over the reins of his brother's pioneering enterprise. And he was selling iron and ironwork to the Board of Ordnance in London. Two years later, in 1541, Levett was supplying shot to the royal forces. The King appointed the armigerous Levett his chief "goonstone maker". Four years later, in 1545, Levett had proven himself so indispensable to the Crown that the Privy Council noted in haste: "Parson Levet ordered by letter to send hither such pieces of artillery as he has already made." The following year, 1546, the privy council appointed Levett to oversee the mines of the Duke of Norfolk's Sussex estates.

Nor was Parson Levett confining his iron foundering to Sussex. Contemporaneous records show that Levett was also producing munitions and weaponry at a site close by the Tower of London, where the Royal stores of armaments were warehoused.

Parson Levett had taken to his new sideline. Apparently he was a natural, so efficient that the Privy Council appointed him in 1546 to oversee the Sussex iron mines that had belonged to the attainted Thomas Howard, 3rd Duke of Norfolk and were confiscated by the Crown. Levett employed master gun founders Charles Garrete and Pierre Baude at his Buxted furnace, as well as five other aliens (probably Frenchmen) in 1543, and six in 1550. By 1543 Levett was the leading supplier of cast-iron muzzle-loading cannons to the English forces. The discovery of one of Levett's two-pound cannons marked with the monogram of King Henry VIII and dated 1543 – seized by the Spanish in Oudewater in the Netherlands in 1575 – proved that Levett succeeded beyond his wildest dreams.

"In the begyning", said Ralf Hogge in a statement of 1573, "there was none that cast any gonnes or shott of yron but only pson (parson) Levet who was my mr. (master) and my p'decessor who mayde none but only for the service of the Kynges matie (majesty)." Levett had confined his manufacturing to the exclusive use of the Crown, forgoing profits from selling abroad, Hogge suggested to Queen Elizabeth, who should allow Levett's successor Hogge to enjoy the same monopoly in return for Hogge's loyalty and refusal to sell abroad.

By 1553, the Board of Ordnance in London had purchased more than 250 of Levett's guns. At a stroke, this English parson who had the armaments business thrust on him by death in the family had morphed into a full-blown entrepreneur. Iron casting and cannon-making became England's first modern industrial economy. Old landowning families like the Sidneys, the Carylls, the Coverts and the Gratwickes rushed to cash in on the boom, which lasted for more than two centuries. The wars of Henry VIII were good for business: the 20 blast furnaces and 28 forges in Sussex in 1549 more than doubled in 25 years to 50 furnaces and 60 forges. The secret was in the English method of vertical casting.

The feudalism of medieval rural England was yielding to changing times. Wealth, as defined by landholding, was once monopolised by the ancient gentry. But the developments of the age of iron were stoking the ambitions of the entrepreneurs of the first industrial age. Among the earliest beneficiaries of this change were some of England's oldest families: the Nevilles, the Sackvilles, the Sidneys, the Boleyns, the Dudleys and the Howards. Their enormous landholdings translated into wood for furnaces, and combined with their political clout, made them candidates for the ranks of the magnates of the coming age of iron. They and their servants became ironmasters.

But the simultaneous increase in the availability of capital, the changing flux of technology (metallurgy), the availability of skilled foreign labour and the rise of an educated middle class meant that iron-making in the Weald would presage change across England. It would, in many ways, pave the way for the rise of the new industrial middle class. A trade consisting mostly of weapons would evolve into other more common tools as well: fire-backs, andirons, anvils, hammers, pots and pans and even grave slabs.

At the same time the constant threat of Scottish and Spanish conflict, culminating in the Spanish Armada of 1588, hung over the iron trade and gave it resilience: one could not have enough cannons. That fact, combined with the new age of exploration and the rise of England's naval power, meant that there was an almost unlimited demand for the new armaments.

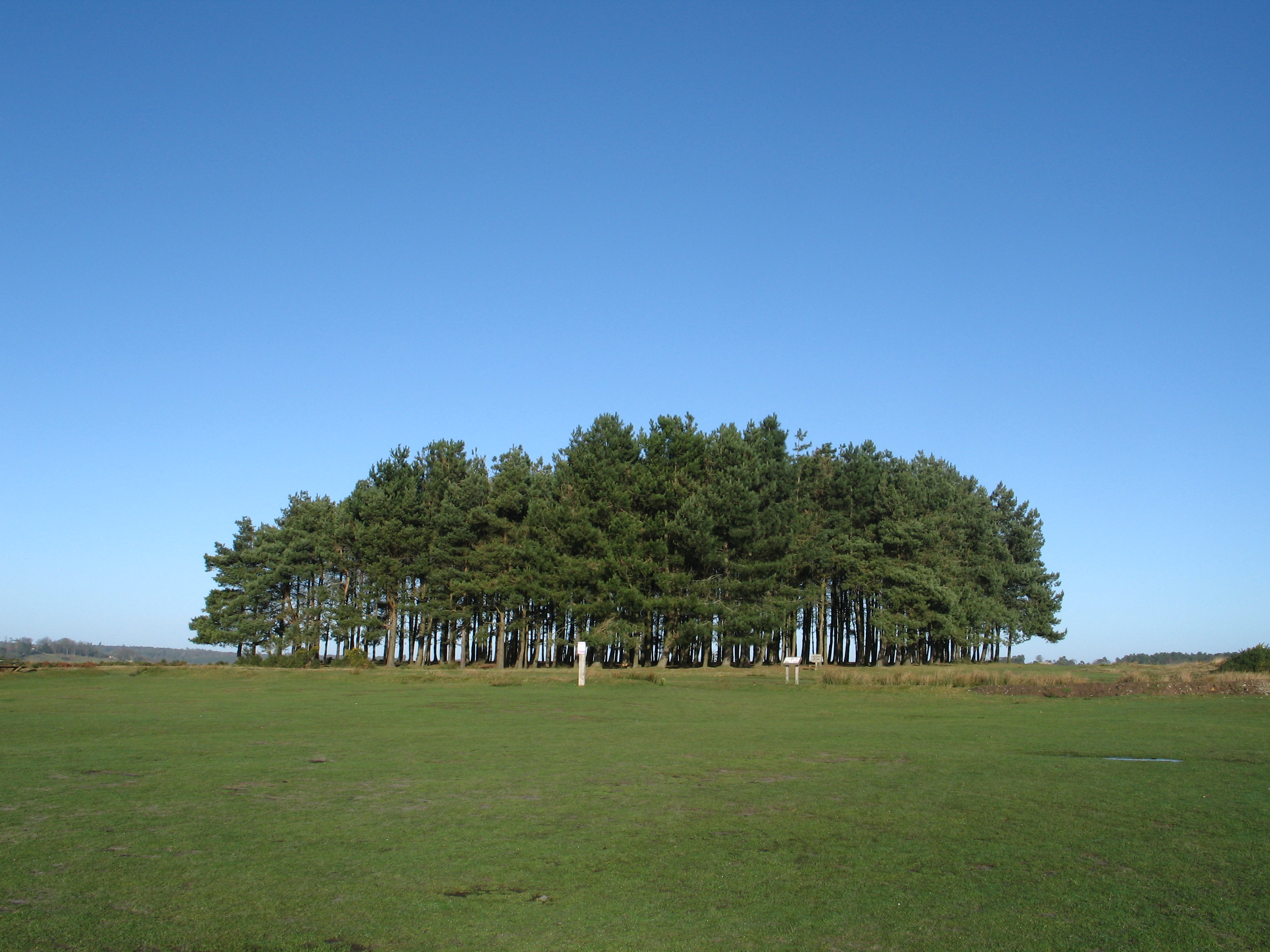
Ashdown Forest in the Sussex Weald provided wood to stoke the blast furnaces

The towns of the Weald in Sussex and Kent were well-placed to capitalise on the new demand. Buxted, for instance, sat on the edge of the Ashdown Forest, an ancient demesne covering some 13,000 acres (53 km^{2}). Few woods matched the oaks of southern England for burning. Much of the woodland was in the hands of the old gentry families of the Sussex and Kent Weald.

The old county aristocracy would lead the way, making hay from the early adoption of this new technology. But capitalism is creative destruction. The adoption of the new technology sowed the eventual demise of the old feudal landowning aristocracy. A new class of merchant-adventurers, inventors, innovators, and industrialists would slowly begin to displace the old landed fatcats.

Eventually, the dwindling woods of the Weald, combined with new coke-fired technology, pushed England's ironworking industry north toward the Midlands and abundant coal. The catalyst for the decline of the Wealden iron industry, writes Ernest Straker in his majesterial study of the ironmasters of the Weald, "was the high price of fuel, caused by the competition of the hop industry and the rising cost of labour. In all the recorded accounts the charcoal is by far the most expensive item."

Over the following two centuries, the Weald was a center of industrial activity and employment. Ernest Straker compares the iron manufactory of that period to modern technological hubs. Eventually, the industry was displaced. At its peak, it employed a portion of the local population and contributed to the regional economy and national resources. Currently, few physical remnants of the industry exist, such as ponds; many former sites are now covered by vegetation. The original buildings have been dismantled and the materials repurposed.

Wealden ironmasters operated during this period, including Parson Levett. He acquired wealth, and his brother John Levett held over 20 manors in Sussex at the time of his death. The will of Reverend William Levett, written nearly 20 years later, named Anthony Browne, 1st Viscount Montagu as executor and lists the assets he acquired.

It happens that one of the first was a parson who, caught between the Bible and the bullet, chose both. It was as if the Archbishop of Canterbury moonlighted as the CEO of Northrop Grumman. Levett never gave up his job as vicar as he became an ironmaster. But if Levett's straddling of the gulf between the military-industrial complex and the Holy Scripture troubled him, there was little sign of it, save for extensive donations to charity in his will.

In that document, parson Levett left money for repairs to Buxted Church and to the parsonage. He also left funds to the 'poor householders' of Buxted, as well as monies to provide for meat every Sunday for the local poor, and herrings and wheat during Lent for the poor of Buxted, Uckfield and Cowden for seven years. He also left £100 to be given to poor scholars by his executors on the advice of his friends the Lord Chancellor, the Bishop of Winchester and Sir Anthony Browne. Levett's will, in which he bestowed more than 40 individual bequests, shows this ironmaster clergyman with a law degree was no ordinary country vicar.

Ironically, Levett's business interests afforded him protection from the country's religious strife. In 1545 Archbishop of Canterbury Thomas Cranmer removed Levett from his vicar's post in Buxted because of Levett's refusal to embrace religious reforms under King Henry VIII. But Levett was quickly reinstated. "Levet was a particularly injudicious target for Cranmer in time of war, since (bizarrely for a canon lawyer, let alone a clergyman) he was one of the government's chief agents in the Sussex armaments industry", writes Diarmaid MacCulloch in his biography of Thomas Cranmer.

Eventually, the Levett family iron interests fell to the heirs of parson Levett's brother John, chiefly the Eversfield, Chaloner and Pope families. (John Eversfield lies buried near rector Levett in the chancel of Buxted's church, and in his will of 26 August 1550, Edmund Pope of Little Horsted leaves to "Rauf Hogg, Mr Parsone Levetes servunte tenne shillings). Following Mr Levett's death, his former servant Hogge carried on the manufacture of iron until his own death in 1585. In his will over thirty years before, Levett made provisions for his young employee, leaving Hogge four pounds in cash and 'six tonne of sows' (a long piece of cast iron made by running molten metal into a sand mould). That simple gesture spoke to the success of their unlikely collaboration. Hogge's name became synonymous with Wealden iron-founding, but it was parson Levett who paved the way.

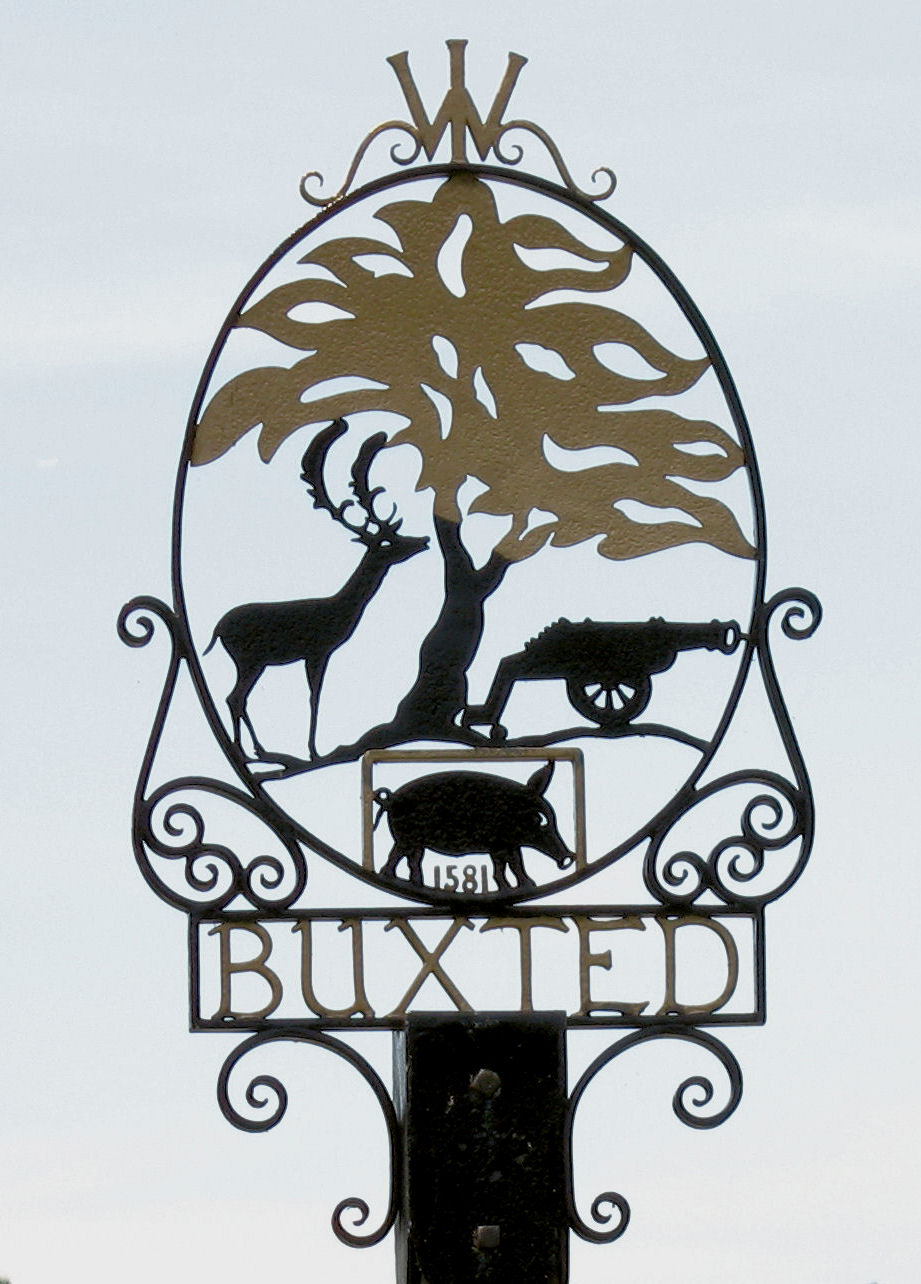
Village sign for Buxted, East Sussex, commemorating casting of first iron muzzle-loading cannon in England, 1543

== See also ==
- Ralf Hogge
- Board of Ordnance
- Wealden iron industry
