= Stockland Farm Meadows =

Coordinates: 51.004°N 0.175°E

- Site of Special Scientific Interest
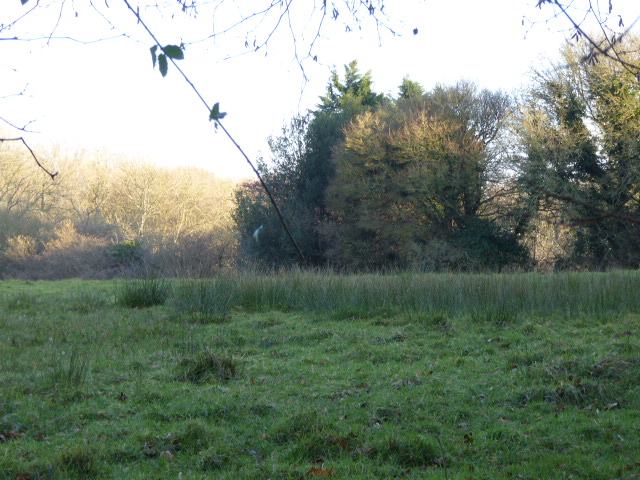
- Location of Stockland Farm Meadows.
- Area of search: East Sussex
- Grid reference: TQ 527 250
- Interest: Biological
- Area: 5.8 hectares (14 acres)
- Notification date: 1992
- Location map: Magic Map

Stockland Farm Meadows is a 5.8-hectare (14-acre) biological Site of Special Scientific Interest south of Crowborough in East Sussex.

These two species rich meadows are traditionally managed. Over 80 species of flora have been recorded, including pepper-saxifrage, betony and cowslip. A small pond has five out of the six British species of amphibian.

The site is private land with no public access.
