= Hastingford Cutting =

Coordinates: 51.012°N 0.170°E

- Site of Special Scientific Interest
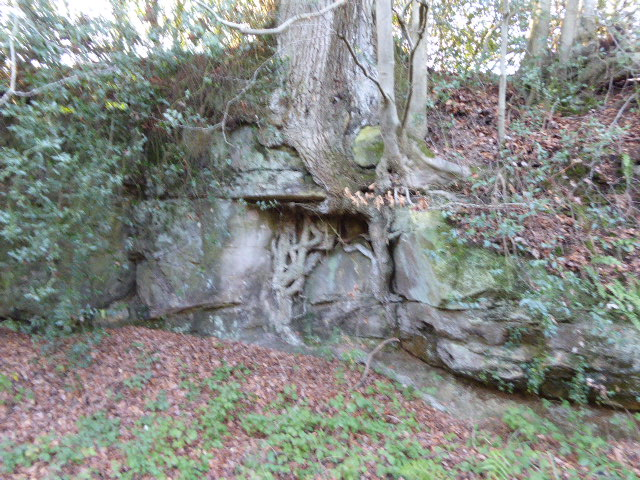
- Location of Hastingford Cutting.
- Area of search: East Sussex
- Grid reference: TQ 523 259
- Interest: Geological
- Area: 0.04 hectares (0.099 acres)
- Notification date: 1990
- Location map: Magic Map

Hastingford Cutting is a 0.04-hectare (0.099-acre) geological Site of Special Scientific Interest south of Crowborough in East Sussex. It is a Geological Conservation Review site.

This site exposes rocks dating to the Hastings Beds of the Early Cretaceous. It has coarse sandstone with pebbles and fossil charcoal in a channel which is interpreted as part of a braided system. It underlies a layer which is thought to be part of the shore of a lake.

The site is on the side of Hastingford Lane.
