= William Hadlow =

British philatelist

William Hadlow (1861 – 1931) was a British philatelic auctioneer who was appointed to the Roll of Distinguished Philatelists in 1930.
