= Ralf Hogge =

English iron-master and gun founder

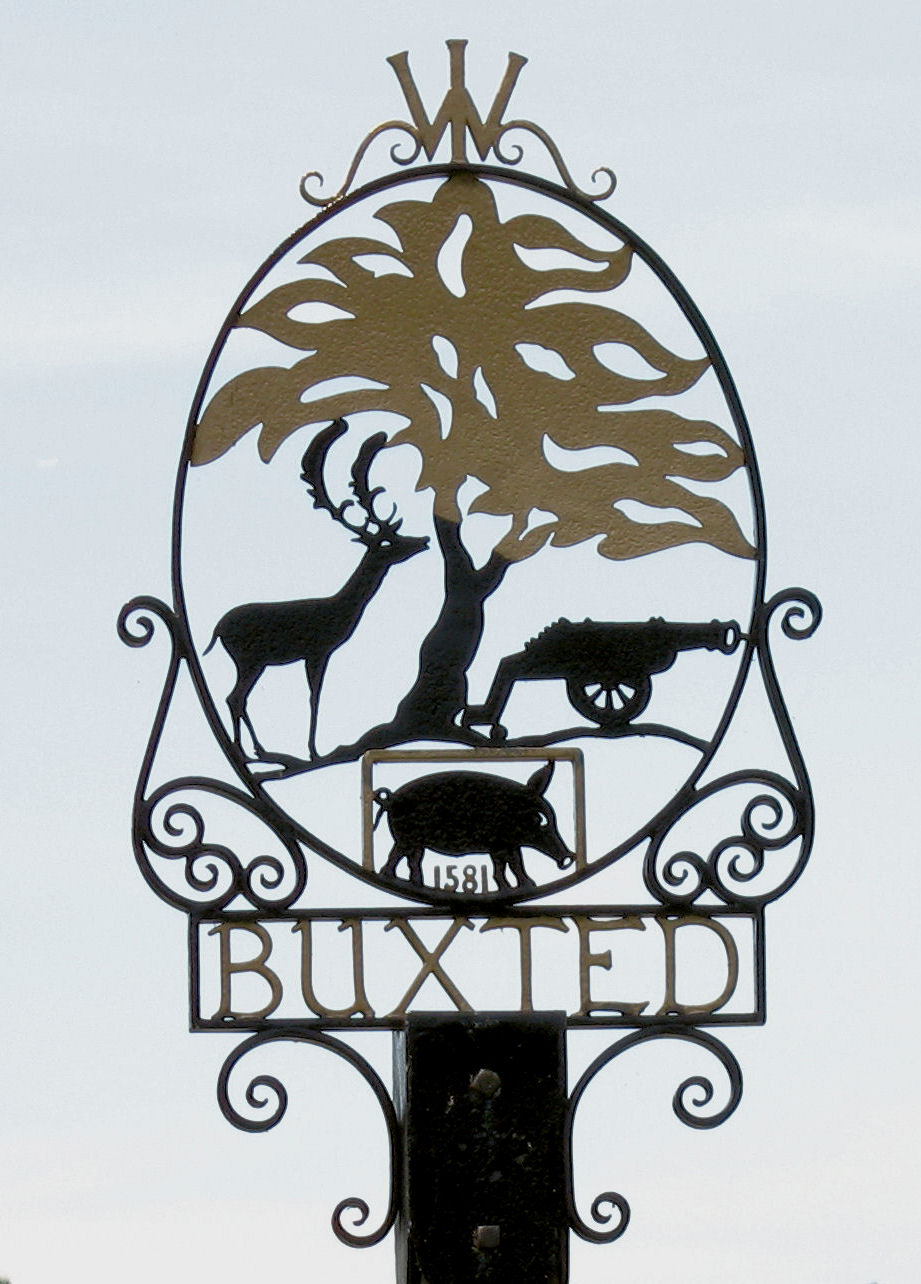
Cannon and Hogge rebus incorporated into the Buxted village sign

Ralf Hogge (his name has also been rendered "Ralph" and "Huggett") was an English iron-master and gun founder to the king.

Working with French-born cannon-maker Pierre Baude and for his employer, parson William Levett, Hogge succeeded in casting the first iron cannon in England, in 1543. After Levett's death, Hogge went into business for himself, producing cannons with the process he had helped perfect.

Hogge's increasing skill at his profession as well as his burgeoning business was manifest in 1560, when Hogge ceased to be known as 'servant to Parson Levett'; after that date, he was "Mr. Ralf Hogge, gentleman." The revolution in English ironfounding had brought a humble tradesman to the status of country squire.

This event was immortalised in verse as:

Master Huggett and his man John
they did cast the first cannon.

In the village of Buxted, East Sussex, "Hogge is assumed to have built Hogge House in 1583 and recorded his name and the date in the form of a cast iron rebus over the door."

Ralf Hogge married Margaret Henslowe, sister of Philip Henslowe, an Elizabethan theatrical entrepreneur and impresario. Philip Henslowe diaries between 1592 and 1609 survive. As well as providing an insight into Elizabethan theatre of that period, they were written on the reverse of Hogge's ironworks accounts for the period 1576 to 1581. They give an in-depth look into the business and casting methods of an early ironmaster.
