= Buxted =

Village and civil parish in East Sussex, England

Coordinates: 50.99°N 0.13°E

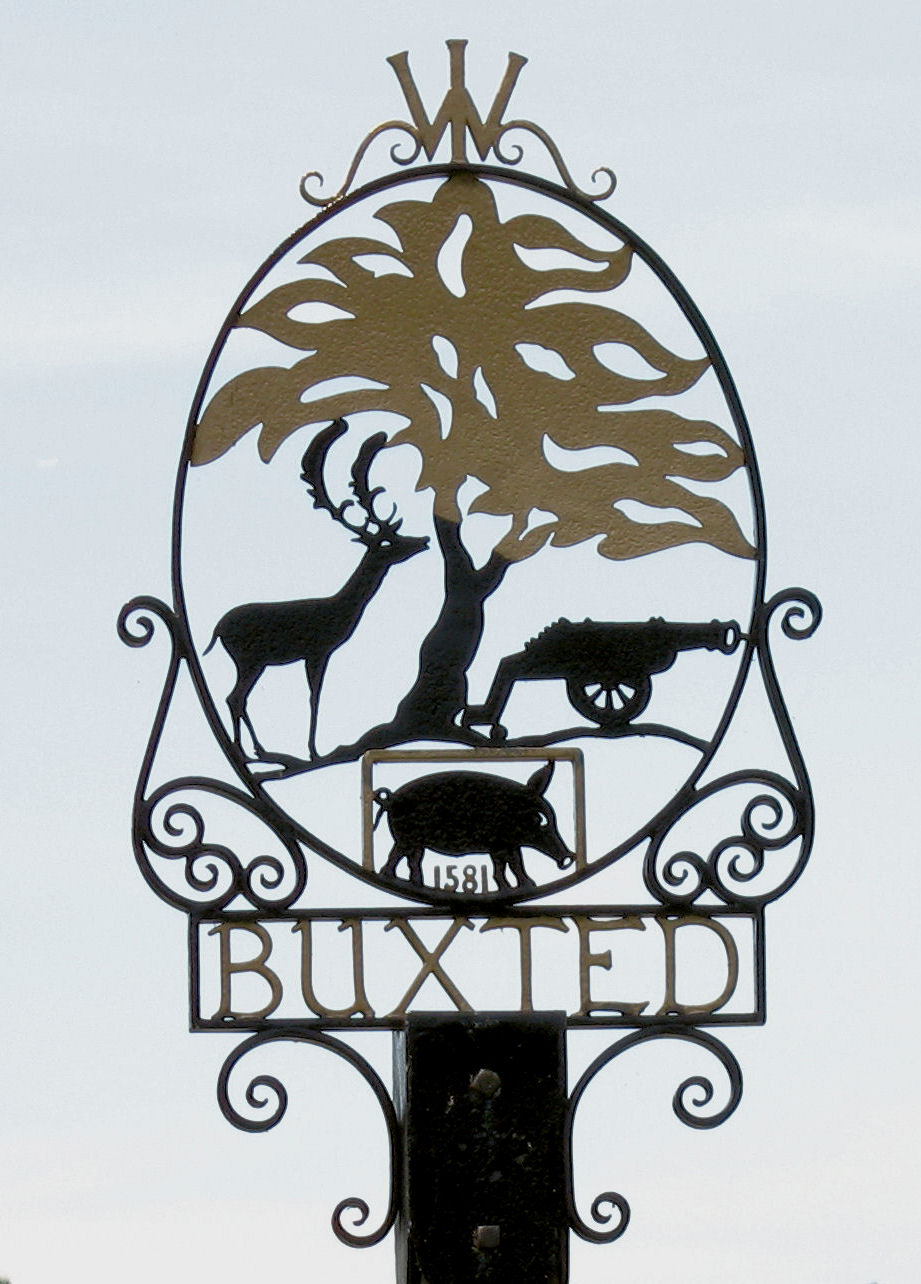
- Buxted village sign

- Location within East Sussex
- Area: 21.6 km^{2} (8.3 sq mi)
- Population: 3,343 (2011)
  - Density: 376/sq mi (145/km^{2})
- OS grid reference: TQ499234
  - London: 37 miles (60 km) NNW
- Civil parish: Buxted
- District: Wealden
- Shire county: East Sussex
- Region: South East
- Country: England
- Sovereign state: United Kingdom
- Post town: UCKFIELD
- Postcode district: TN22
- Dialling code: 01825
- Police: Sussex
- Fire: East Sussex
- Ambulance: South East Coast
- UK Parliament: East Grinstead and Uckfield
- Website: Buxted Parish

Buxted is a village and civil parish in the Wealden district of East Sussex in England. The parish is situated on the Weald, north of Uckfield; the settlements of Five Ash Down, Heron's Ghyll and High Hurstwood are included within its boundaries. At one time its importance lay in the Wealden iron industry, and later it became commercially important in the poultry and egg industry.

The village has both road (the high street is also the A272) and rail links to Uckfield and to London via Oxted.

== History ==
The origin of the name Buxted comes from the Saxon Bochs stede (place of the beeches).

The iron-making industry became a major part of Buxted's early prosperity. The first standard blast furnace was called Queenstock and was built in Buxted parish in about 1491. The cannon-making industry in the Weald started at a furnace on the stream at Hoggets Farm lying to the north between Buxted and Hadlow Down. The first cast-iron cannon made in England was cast in 1543 by Ralf Hogge, an employee of Parson William Levett, a Sussex rector with broad interests, paradoxically enough, in the emerging English armaments industry.

Levett was removed as Buxted's vicar in 1545 by Thomas Cranmer, Archbishop of Canterbury. But thanks to friends in high places, Levett was quickly reinstated. After regaining his clerical position, Levett died a very wealthy man, thanks to his iron mining and smelting operations, founded by his brother John Levett, one of the founders of the Sussex iron industry and one of the wealthiest men in Sussex, who controlled 20 Sussex manors at his death in 1535. The family is of Norman descent and one of the oldest in Sussex. William and John Levett were the sons of a large landowner in the Hollington area of Hastings, Sussex. In his lengthy will, parson William Levett left large charitable bequests which he directed be supervised by his friend Anthony Browne, 1st Viscount Montagu. Richard Woodman, an ironmaster was born here, but he was burnt as a Protestant martyr in 1557.

The novelist George Alfred Lawrence was born in Buxted in 1827, the eldest son of the Anglican curate at the time, Rev. Alfred Charnley Lawrence.

The manor house, known as Buxted Park, was purchased by the then Prime Minister, Robert Jenkinson, 2nd Earl of Liverpool, in the early part of the 19th century. He set about extending the park surrounding the house, and eventually coerced the villagers to vacate their own houses to enable him to do so. The village (although not the church) was cleared away and the village then took up its present location. By 1836, the entire original village centre was no more, having been relocated to the site it occupies today. Some of the outlying houses pre-date this move, such as Britts, a 17th-century farmhouse, which still stands. The original manor house was built further down the hill next to the railway where Queen Victoria once visited – the house being the Chequers of its day. The original house burnt down in the latter part of the 19th century and was rebuilt in its present location.

== Legends ==
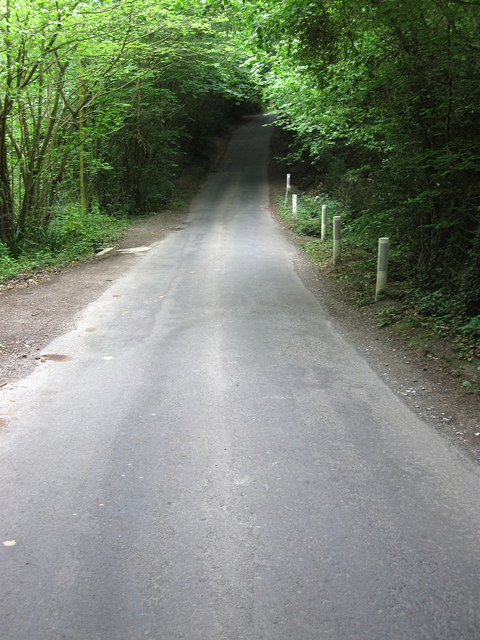
Nan Tuck's Lane

According to local legend, the ghost of Nan Tuck, a woman from Rotherfield who allegedly poisoned a man in the 17th century, is said to haunt Nan Tuck's Lane in Buxted. Supposedly, the murder was quickly discovered and Tuck evaded her pursuers over the next few days by climbing hedges and hiding in hay ricks. It is said her intention was to take sanctuary in Buxted Parish Church – according to the right of asylum, if one could reach a church and touch the altar, a fugitive might escape punishment – but with local officials pursuing her, she was forced to run into the woods. According to the tale, she disappeared there and was never seen again. Legend holds that a circular patch of land in the woods near Nan Tuck's Lane stays unfertile and no vegetation will grow there.

== Census ==
Buxted is part of electoral ward called Buxted and Maresfield. The population of this ward as taken in the census 2011 was 5,534.

== Geography ==
The parish of Buxted lies partly within the High Weald Area of Outstanding Natural Beauty, although the village itself is outside it. Tributaries of both the Rivers Rother (flowing eastward) and Cuckmere flow through the parish, and were used by the iron industry for power. It is largely a rural parish, although the original Britts farmland is now largely covered by modern houses along Britts Farm Road, constructed in the 1980s.

The parish contains an area of Site of Special Scientific Interest—Buxted Park, an old deer park which is very important for the conservation of invertebrates. Buxted Park is now a country house hotel, owned by Hand Picked Hotels around which there are some lovely walks.

The wholesale Buxted Chickens had a factory in Buxted as well as one in Five Ash Down. Buxted Chickens was founded by Antony Fisher, who also founded the Institute of Economic Affairs. The Buxted brand, formerly owned by the Grampian Country Foods, is now owned by 2 Sisters Food Group. The Buxted site closed down in the 1980s, and is now owned by the Woodland Trust.

== Religion ==
The original parish church, St Margaret the Queen, is located in Buxted Park and was built in 1250. Its dedication is to Saint Margaret of Scotland. Other churches in the parish include St Mary the Virgin, consecrated 1887, Buxted Methodist Church, built 1907 and Holy Trinity Church in High Hurstwood. In Heron's Ghyll is the Roman Catholic Grade II listed, St John the Evangelist Church.

== Governance ==
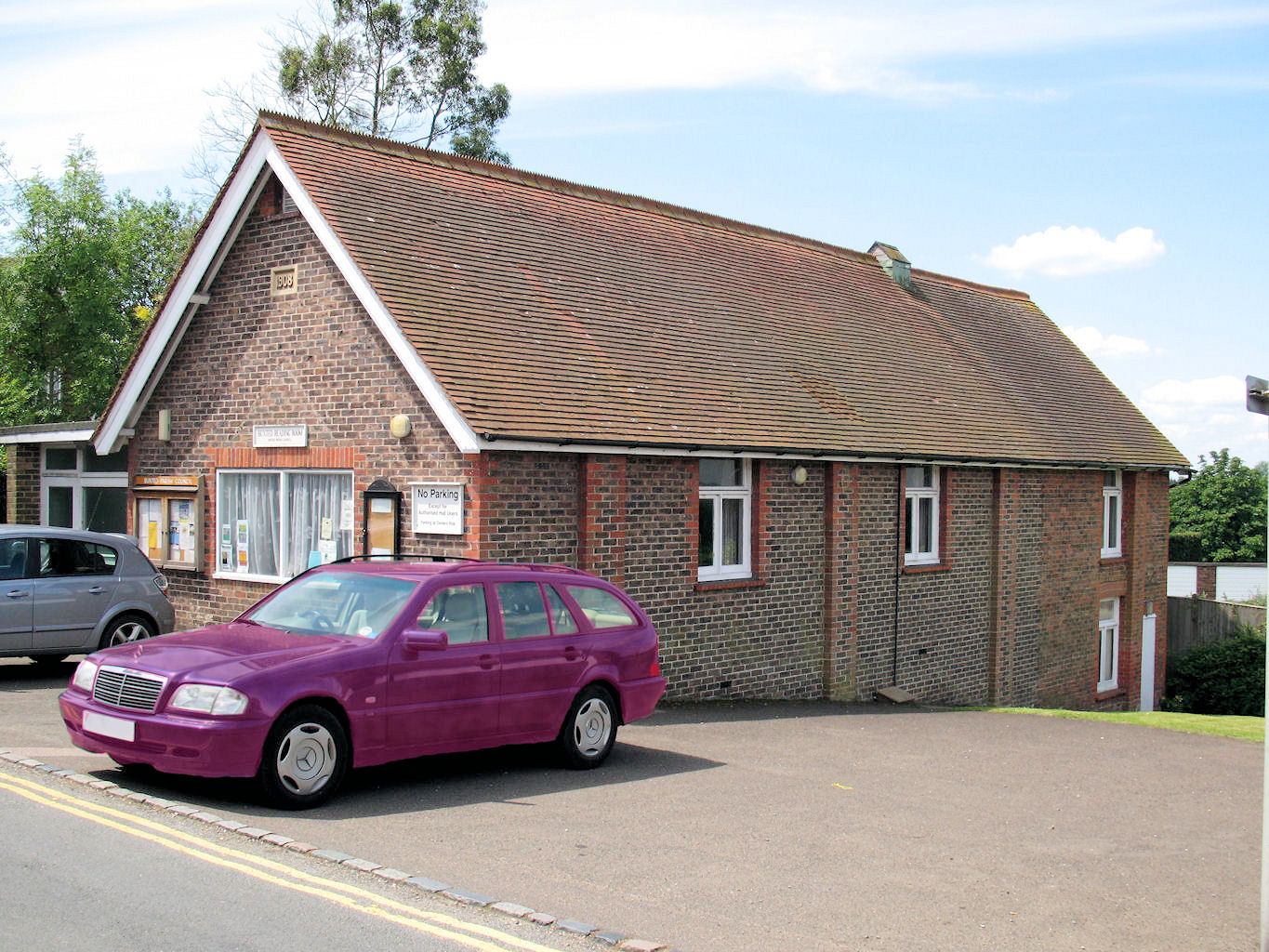
Buxted Parish Hall

The first, community level of government is Buxted Parish Council which meets once a month, except in August. The Parish Council is responsible for local amenities such as the provision of litter bins, bus shelters and allotments. It is also a statutory consultee on local planning applications and liaises closely with Wealden District Council on local development issues. The Parish Council works closely with WDC on safety, planning, transport and other issues and is a channel of communication between district and parish tiers of government.

For elections, the parish is divided into two wards, Buxted (ten seats) and High Hurstwood Ward (five seats) and includes Five Ash Down. The May 2015 election was uncontested with 13 seats being filled.

Wealden District council provides the next level of government with services such as refuse collection, planning consent, leisure amenities and council tax collection. Buxted lies within the Buxted and Maresfield Ward, which provides two councillors. The May 2015 election returned two Conservative councillors.

East Sussex county council is the third tier of government, providing education, libraries and highway maintenance. Buxted falls within the Buxted Maresfield district. Roy Galley, Conservative, was elected in the May 2013 election with 51.4% of the vote.

The UK Parliament constituency for Buxted is Wealden. The Conservative Nus Ghani was elected in the May 2015 election.

Prior to Brexit in 2020, the village was part of the South East England constituency in the European Parliament.

== Transport ==
The A272 cross-country road passes through the village from west to east; it connects with the A22 and A26 roads about a mile (1.6 km) to the west.

Buxted station lies on the Oxted Line between Uckfield and Crowborough. The line serves London at London Bridge railway station via East Croydon. Or you can change at East Croydon for Victoria.
