= Maurice Purcell-FitzGerald =

English cricketer

Personal information
- Full name: Maurice Noel Ryder Purcell-Fitzgerald
- Born: 22 December 1835; Torquay, Devon, England
- Died: 17 November 1877 (aged 41); Boulge, Suffolk, England
- Batting: Right-handed

Domestic team information
- Years: Team
- 1866: Marylebone Cricket Club
- 1864: Sussex

Career statistics
Competition	First-class
Matches	2
Runs scored	8
Batting average	4.00
100s/50s	–/–
Top score	8
Balls bowled	–
Wickets	–
Bowling average	–
5 wickets in innings	–
10 wickets in match	–
Best bowling	–
Catches/stumpings	1/–
- Source: Cricinfo, 14 March 2012

Maurice Noel Ryder Purcell-FitzGerald (22 December 1835 – 17 December 1877) was an English cricketer. Purcell-FitzGerald was a right-handed batsman. The son of John Purcell-FitzGerald and Augusta Jane Lisle March Phillipps, he was born at Torquay, Devon.

Purcell-FitzGerald made a single first-class appearance for Sussex against Hampshire at Day's Antelope Ground, Southampton, in 1864. In this match, he scored 8 runs in Sussex's first-innings, before being run out, while in their second-innings, he wasn't required to bat, with Sussex winning the match by 10 wickets. Two years later, he made a second first-class appearance, this time for the Marylebone Cricket Club against Hampshire at Lord's. Purcell-FitzGerald was dismissed for a duck by Sampson Tubb in the Marylebone Cricket Club's first-innings. He wasn't required to bat again in the match, with the Marylebone Cricket Club winning by an innings and 58 runs.

Purcell-FitzGerald married Anne Laurie on 25 January 1860. They had six children, three girls and three boys. He was for many years a resident at The Crouch House in Seaford, Sussex, but died at Boulge Hall, Boulge, Suffolk, on 17 December 1877. His uncle was the poet Edward FitzGerald.

== See also ==
- FitzGerald dynasty
