= John Purcell-Fitzgerald =

English lay preacher

John Purcell-Fitzgerald (1803–1879) was an English lay preacher, and the elder brother of the poet Edward FitzGerald. He has been called "eccentric and religiously fanatical".

== Life ==
He was born at Bredfield, Suffolk, the son and heir of John Purcell who in 1818 changed his surname to Fitzgerald. In 1858 he took the surname Purcell-Fitzgerald. He was one of eight children of Purcell and his wife and cousin Mary Frances Fitzgerald. Robert Bernard Martin describes him in relation to his siblings as "easily the most eccentric of a peculiar lot".

Fitzgerald was a pupil of Benjamin Heath Malkin at Bury St Edmunds Free School. He matriculated at Trinity College, Cambridge in 1822, graduating B.A. in 1826 and M.A. in 1829. Venn writes that when young he "had suffered from brain-fever which had had the effect of so weakening his sight, that it became impossible for him, as had been intended, to take Orders in the Church of England." Martin comments that he "had been strange all his life, sufficiently so at Cambridge to warrant special attention for eccentricity". He had a speech impediment, described as "a bad "sissing" or whistling ... that alternated with a clicking of his teeth". Nonetheless, he took up preaching, and attracted audiences in the 1840s to hear his views on biblical prophecy. He was valued by evangelicals.

== Property owner ==
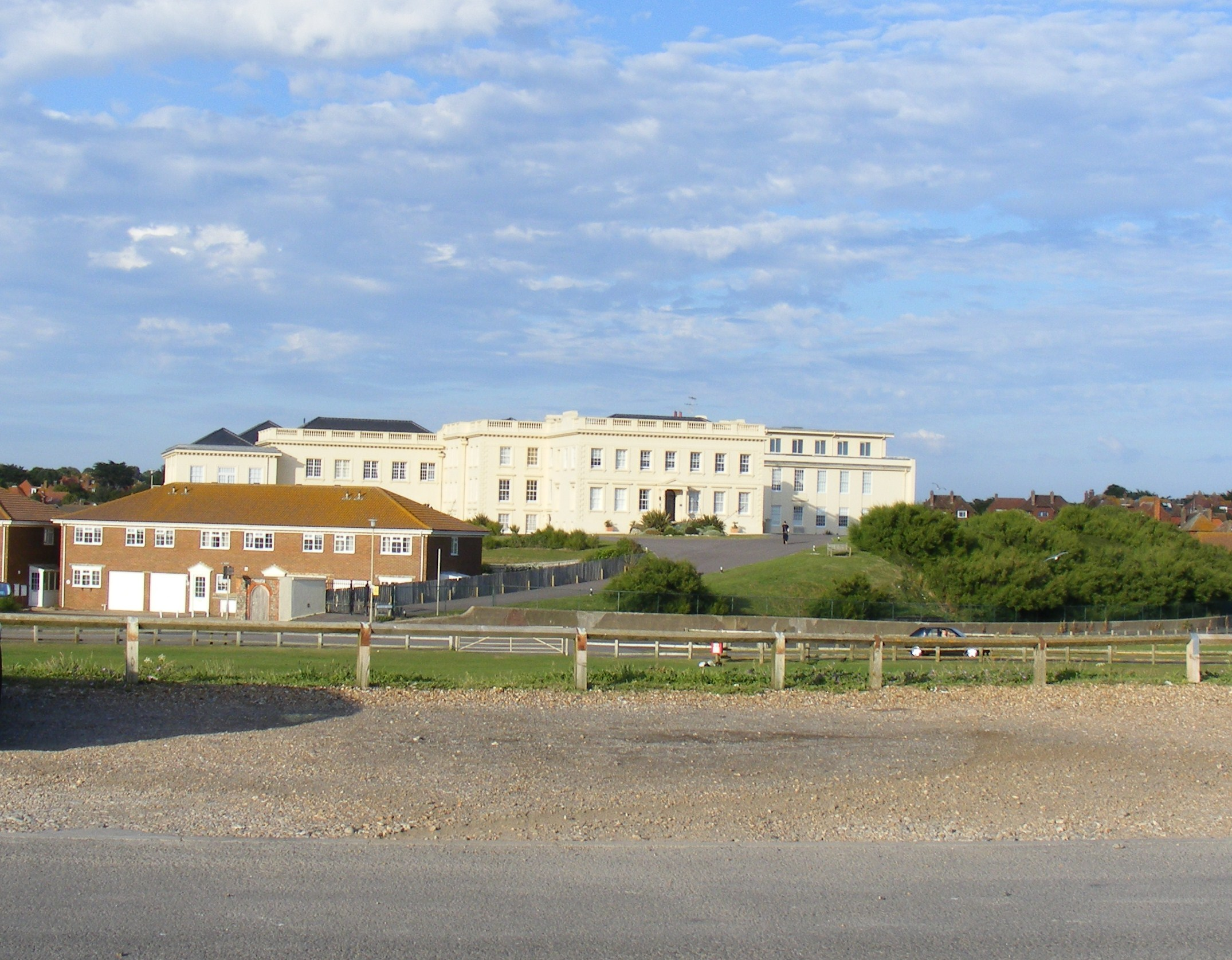
Corsica Hall, Seaford

John Fitzgerald the elder became by inheritance a wealthy landowner. He built in 1826 Castle Irwell on the edge of Pendleton in Lancashire, on one of his estates. It was close to the site of Pendleton Colliery, which he also owned, but which was a loss-making venture. In Northamptonshire was the Naseby Wooleys estate. He suffered bankruptcy in 1849.

With numerous family properties in Ireland and England, John Fitzgerald the younger resided at some point at Little Island in County Waterford. He inherited Boulge Hall in Suffolk.

The "History of Parliament", calling Fitzgerald a "highly eccentric and grossly fat lay preacher", states that the family properties, including also an estate at Seaford, passed to him; and that he resided for much of his time at Castle Irwell. He had additions made to that house in 1861. His Letter of Earnest Remonstrance (1870) to W. E. Gladstone, on the appointment as Bishop of Exeter of Frederick Temple the previous year, was signed as from Castle Irwell.

== Religious associations ==
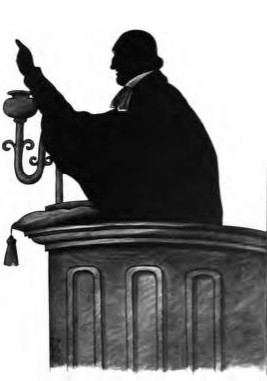
Timothy Richard Matthews

In 1847, Fitzgerald published a funeral sermon for the Rev. Timothy Richard Matthews of Bedford. Matthews had a chapel in Bromham Road, and Fitzgerald assisted him for some services.

In the Manchester area, Fitzgerald arranged for the hire of lecture halls, and speakers at them. Involved were Robert Baxter (1802–1889) of Doncaster the former Irvingite, Edmund Gardiner Fishbourne, and Joseph Samme.

== Family ==
Fitzgerald married twice. His first wife, married in 1832, was Augusta Jane Lisle Phillipps, daughter of Charles March Phillipps of Garendon Hall. After her death in 1837, he married in 1843 Hester Haddon. Gerald Charles Fitzgerald (1820–1879) and Maurice Noel Ryder Fitzgerald (1835–1877) were sons of the first marriage.
