= Arthur Hardinge =

Arthur Hardinge may refer to:

- Arthur Edward Hardinge (1828–1892), British Army officer
- Arthur Henry Hardinge (1859–1933), his son, diplomat

== See also ==
- Arthur Harding (1878–1947), British rugby union player
