= Dallimore =

Dallimore is a surname. Notable people with the name include:

- Arthur Henry Dallimore (1873–1970), New Zealand Pentecostal minister and British-Israelite
- Brian Dallimore (born 1973), American baseball player
- Ceri Dallimore (born 1974), Welsh sport shooter
- Chloe Dallimore (born 1974–75), Australian actor, singer and dancer
- Helen Dallimore (born 1971), Australian actress
- Maurice Dallimore (1912–1973), English actor
- William Dallimore (1871–1959), English botanist
