= Penshurst =

Village in Kent, England

Coordinates: 51.17041°N 0.17997°E

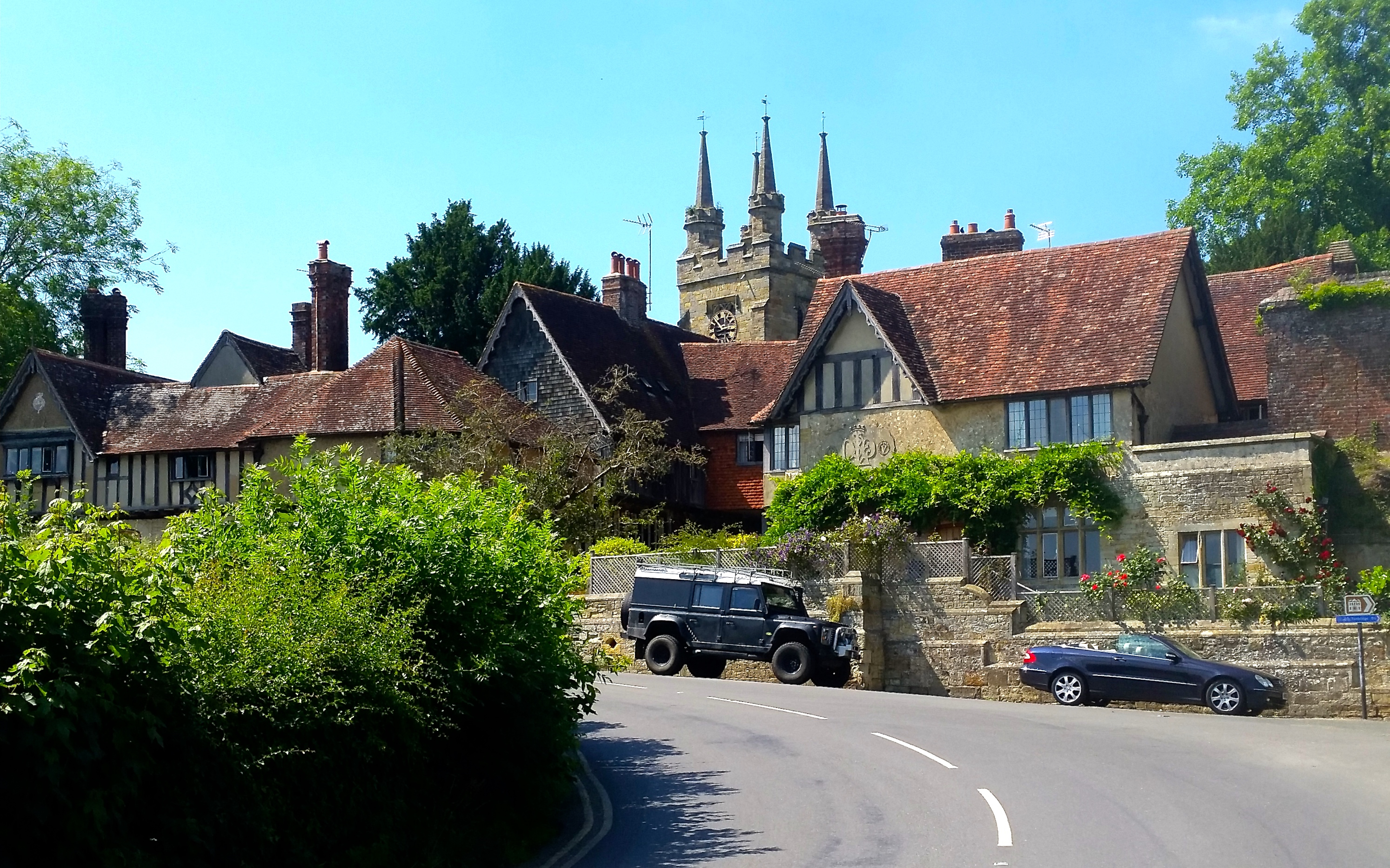
- Penshurst village

- Location within Kent
- Population: 1,628 (2011 Census)
- OS grid reference: TQ525435
- Civil parish: Penshurst
- District: Sevenoaks
- Shire county: Kent
- Region: South East
- Country: England
- Sovereign state: United Kingdom
- Post town: Tonbridge
- Postcode district: TN11
- Police: Kent
- Fire: Kent
- Ambulance: South East Coast
- UK Parliament: Tonbridge

Penshurst is an historic village and civil parish located in a valley upon the northern slopes of the Kentish Weald, at the confluence of the River Medway and the River Eden, within the Sevenoaks district of Kent, England.

The village is situated between the market town of Tonbridge and the spa town of Royal Tunbridge Wells, some 6 miles (9.7 km) south of Sevenoaks. Penshurst and its neighbouring village, Fordcombe, recorded a combined population of some 1,628 at the 2011 Census.

The majority of the parish falls within the High Weald Area of Outstanding Natural Beauty, and the village is itself a conservation zone, with controls on the landscape ensuring the protection of its woodland and fields. There are several listed buildings in the village.

The village is the home of two historic estates. Penshurst Place, formerly owned by King Henry VIII, sits at the centre of the village in the valley, while Swaylands is situated at the top of Rogues Hill on the outskirts of the village.

== History ==
The village grew up around Penshurst Place, the ancestral home of the Sidney family. There are many Tudor-looking buildings in the village, although some are Victorian. Henry Stafford the first Baron Stafford was born here in 1501. Penshurst was a centre of the Wealden ironworking industry.

The Leicester Arms, once part of the Penshurst Estate, was owned by Sir William Sidney, grandfather of poet and statesman Sir Philip Sidney. His other grandson, the Viscount De L’isle, was appointed Earl of Leicester in 1618 and it was shortly after this that The Leicester Arms, formerly known as The Porcupine, was renamed in his honour. The pub and hotel is now owned privately.

Penshurst railway station, on the Tonbridge to Redhill railway line, is some 2 miles (3.2 km) north of the village, at the hamlet of Chiddingstone Causeway. Penshurst Airfield was located close to the station, but within the parish of Leigh. It opened in 1916 as a military airfield, and served as a civil airfield from 1919-36. It was reopened as RAF Penshurst in 1940, and closed in 1946. To the south of the village, within the parish, are the settlements of Saint's Hill and Smart's Hill.

== Penshurst Place ==
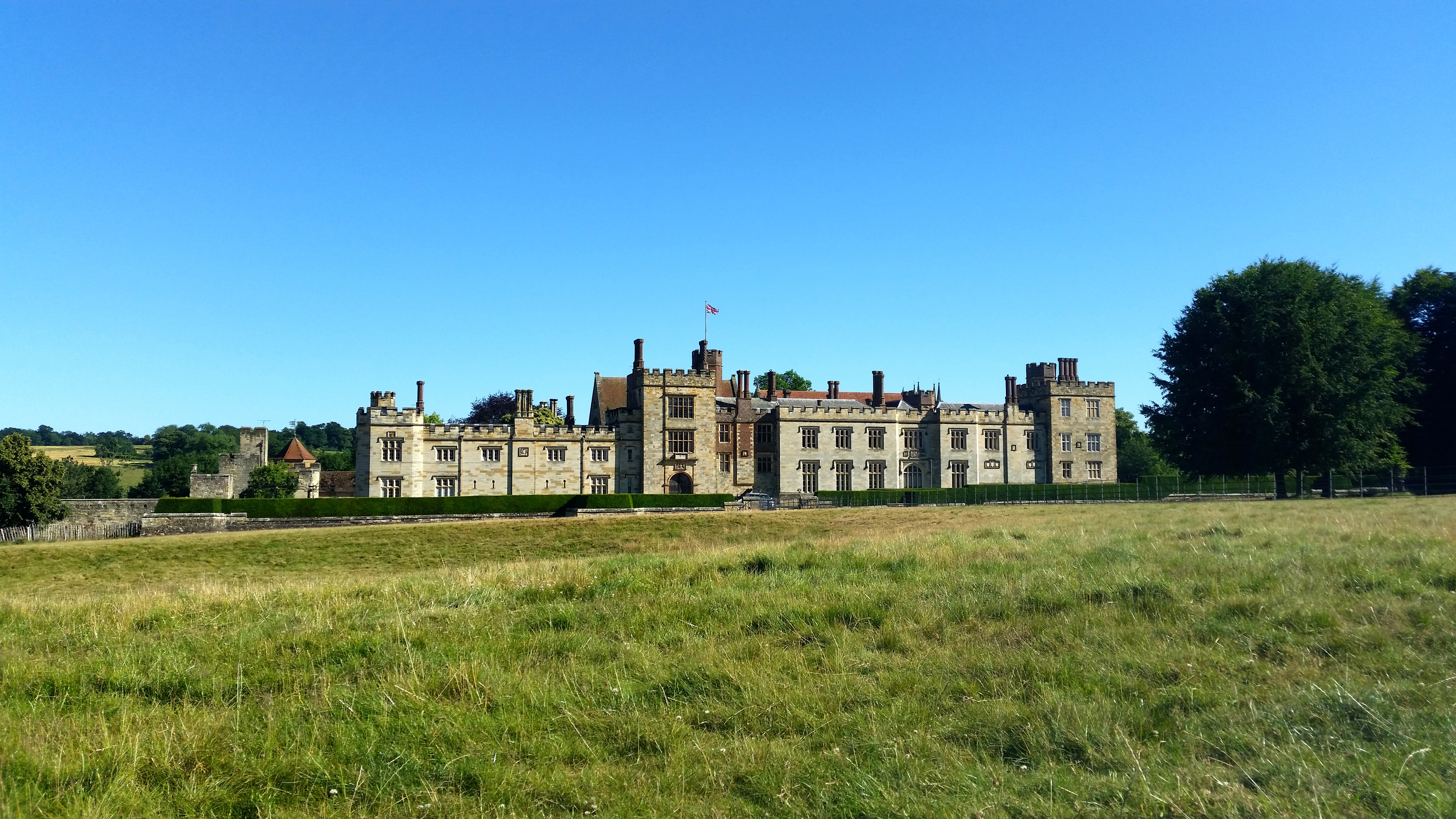
Penshurst Place

Penshurst Place is a 14th century manor house built in 1341. The 2,500 acre estate, once the property of King Henry VIII, was left to his son King Edward VI and granted to Sir William Sidney in 1552. The Sidney family have been in continuous occupation for more than 460 years since. The house and its extensive gardens are now open to the public. The historic banqueting hall at Penshurst Place has been used as a filming location for many Hollywood films, including The Secret Garden and The Other Boleyn Girl, as well as the BBC television series Merlin and Wolf Hall.

The ancient historic parkland provides scenic walks to visitors, contributing significantly to Penshurst's tourism industry. The two walking trails across the estate - the Parkland and the Riverside Walks, both take in part of the Eden Valley walk. Seven miles of the Rivers Medway and Eden flow through the Estate, and there are several lakes. Both game and coarse fishing are popular at Penshurst Place.

== St John the Baptist Church ==
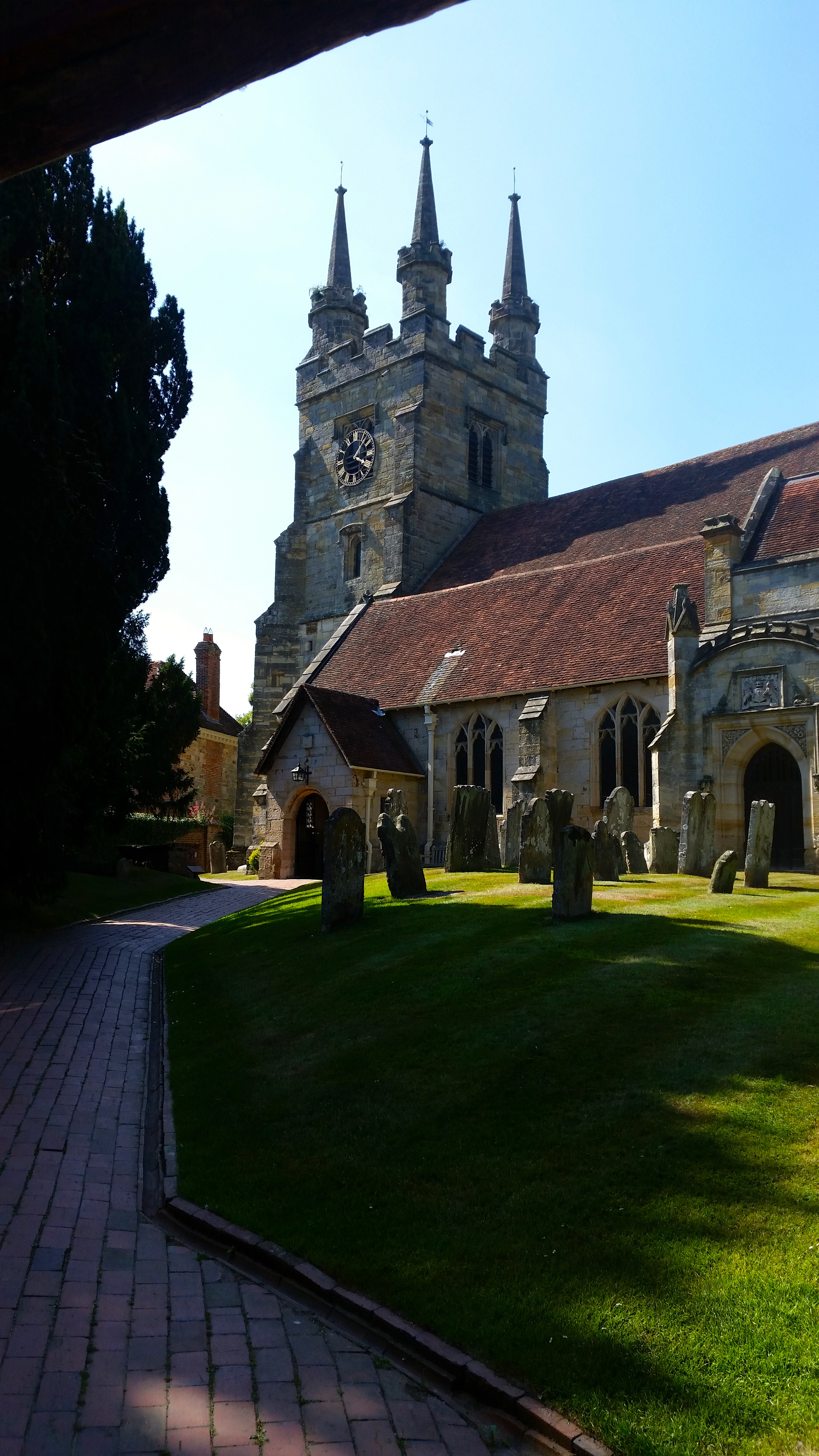
Penshurst Church

The parish church, dedicated to St John the Baptist, is one of the two churches in the civil parish. The Grade I listed church houses many memorials and tombs, including those of a Viceroy of India, two Field Marshals and two winners of the Victoria Cross.

== Notable residents ==
- The Sidney family of Penshurst Place, including
  - Sir Philip Sidney (1554–1586), poet, courtier, scholar, and soldier of the Elizabethan era
  - William Sidney, 1st Viscount De L'Isle (1909–1991), Governor-General of Australia
- The Hardinge family, including
  - Field Marshal Henry Hardinge, 1st Viscount Hardinge (1785–1856), British Army officer and politician
  - Charles Hardinge, 1st Baron Hardinge of Penshurst (1858–1944), Viceroy of India
  - Frances Hardinge (b 1973), author
- Arthur Henry Dallimore (b 1873), New Zealand Pentecostal minister and British-Israelite
- George Drummond of Drummonds Bank
- Sandy Gall, a former ITN newscaster
