= Fordcombe =

Village in Kent, England

Coordinates: 51°8′N 0°11′E

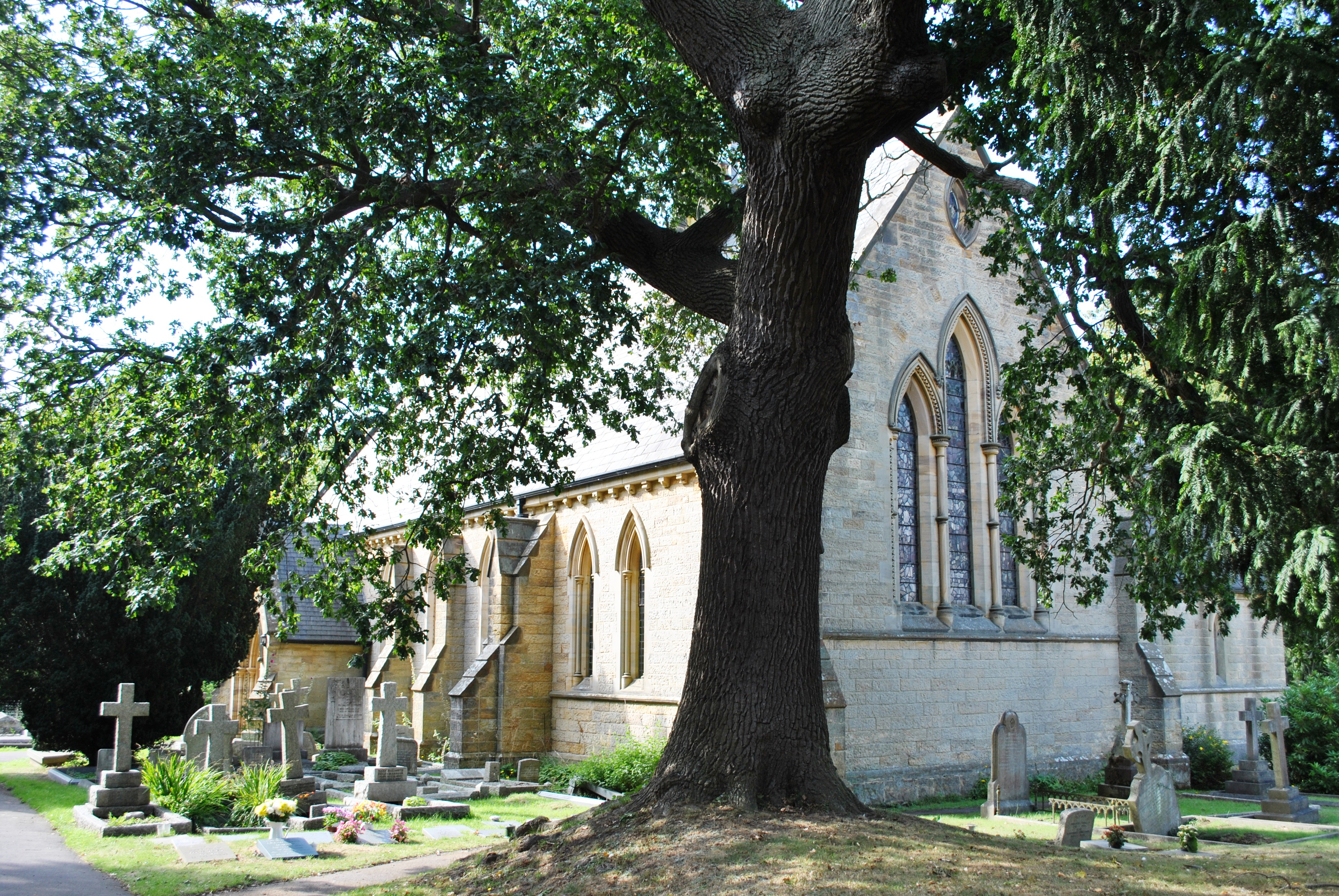
- St Peter's Church, Fordcombe

- Location within Kent
- Civil parish: Penshurst
- District: Sevenoaks
- Shire county: Kent
- Region: South East
- Country: England
- Sovereign state: United Kingdom
- Post town: TUNBRIDGE WELLS
- Postcode district: TN3
- Police: Kent
- Fire: Kent
- Ambulance: South East Coast
- UK Parliament: Tonbridge

Fordcombe is a village within the civil parish of Penshurst in the Sevenoaks district of Kent, England. The village is located on the northern slopes of the Weald, five miles (8 km) west of Royal Tunbridge Wells.

The church, part of a united benefice with Penshurst, Chiddingstone and Chiddingstone Causeway, is dedicated to St Peter. Several members of the Hardinge family are buried in the churchyard:

- Henry Hardinge, 1st Viscount Hardinge (1785–1856), Field Marshal, Governor-General of India
- Charles Hardinge, 2nd Viscount Hardinge (1822–1894), politician
- Charles Hardinge, 1st Baron Hardinge of Penshurst (1858–1944), diplomat and statesman, Viceroy of India
- Alexander Hardinge, 2nd Baron Hardinge of Penshurst (1894–1960), Army officer and courtier
- Sir Arthur Edward Hardinge (1828–1892), Army general, Governor of Gibraltar
- Sir Arthur Henry Hardinge (1859–1933), diplomat

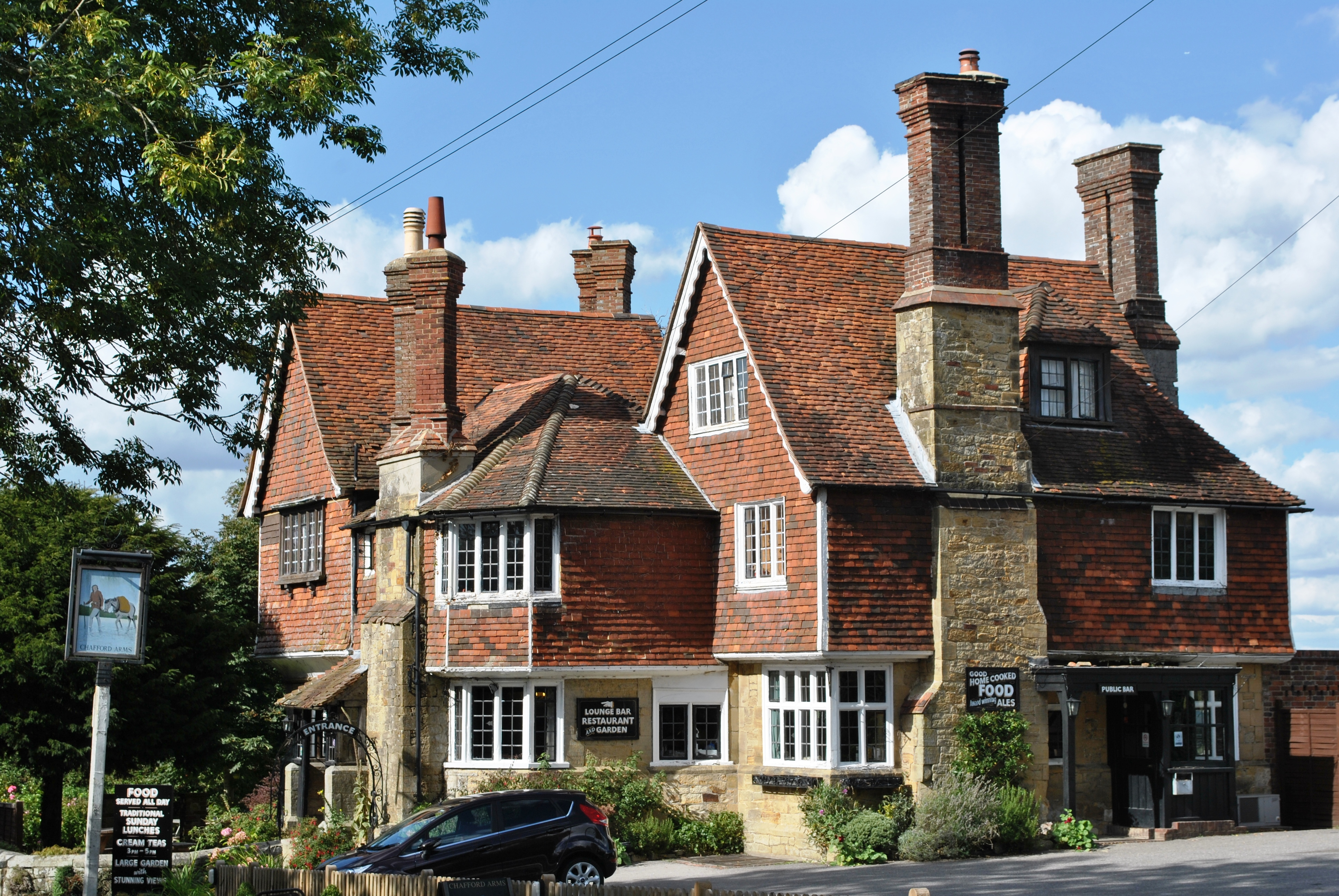
Chafford Arms pub

The Chafford Arms pub is at the heart of the village.
