= John Fitzgerald (1775–1852) =

British member of parliament

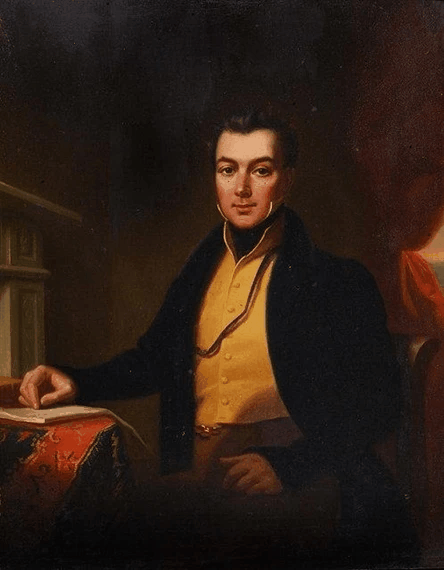
John Fitzgerald

John Fitzgerald (25 December 1775 – 18 March 1852) was a British Member of Parliament.

He was born John Purcell, the son of John Purcell, a Dublin physician and his wife Eleanor, the daughter of John Fitzgerald of Waterford. The Purcells were an Anglo-Irish family who had arrived in England at the time of the Norman conquest and settled in Ireland by 1172. John Purcell, junior was educated at Trinity College Dublin (1790) and trained in the law at the Middle Temple (1792) and King's Inns (1793). He was called to the Irish bar in 1796, but never practised.

He married his cousin Mary Frances in 1801, the daughter and heiress of his uncle John Fitzgerald of Little Island, Waterford, who also had estates at Pendleton in Lancashire and Gayton, Staffordshire. The couple lived at the Bredfield House, also known as the White House, Bredfield, near Woodbridge, Suffolk and had three sons and five daughters. In 1810 Mary Frances, whose elder brother had died in 1807, inherited her great-aunt's estate, including the 3,000-acre manor of Naseby Wooleys, Northamptonshire. In 1823 he erected an obelisk to mark the site of the battle of Naseby. When she then inherited her father's estates in 1818, Purcell took the name of Fitzgerald. His wealthy wife spent much of her time circulating in London and Brighton society, travelling in a yellow carriage pulled by black horses, whilst Fitzgerald preferred the life of a Suffolk squire. He was appointed High Sheriff of Suffolk for 1824–25.

The following year he leased Wherstead Lodge, near Ipswich and also bought property in Seaford, Sussex in order to stand for Parliament in 1826 as candidate for the Seaford constituency. He was duly elected, sitting until the constituency was abolished in the Great Reform Act 1832. In the late 1820s he commissioned Robert Stephenson, (brother of George Stephenson), to commence coal-mining on his Lancashire estate, but fraud and flooding made the Pendleton Colliery venture unsuccessful and he was forced to file for bankruptcy. He and his wife were now formally separated and she left to live at Little Island, where she died in 1855. In 1835 he moved into Boulge Hall, near Woodbridge. His younger son Edward Fitzgerald, the poet and translator of The Rubaiyat of Omar Khayyam, lived in a cottage in the grounds.

In 1838–39 he served as High Sheriff of County Waterford.

On his death in 1852, his remaining estates were inherited by his eldest son John, a lay preacher, who took the name Purcell.

Parliament of the United Kingdom
Preceded by Charles Rose Ellis; George Welbore Agar-Ellis	Member of Parliament for Seaford; 1826 – 1832; With: Augustus Frederick Ellis (1826–27); George Canning (1827); Augustus Frederick Ellis (1827–31); William Lyon (1831–32)	Constituency abolished
