= Bredfield House =

House in Bredfield, Suffolk, England

Coordinates: 52°6′51″N 1°18′32″E

Bredfield House (or White House as it was also known) was a now-demolished country house situated in the village of Bredfield, around 2 miles north of Woodbridge, Suffolk, England, United Kingdom. It was a Jacobean building and was traditionally the seat of the Jenney family.

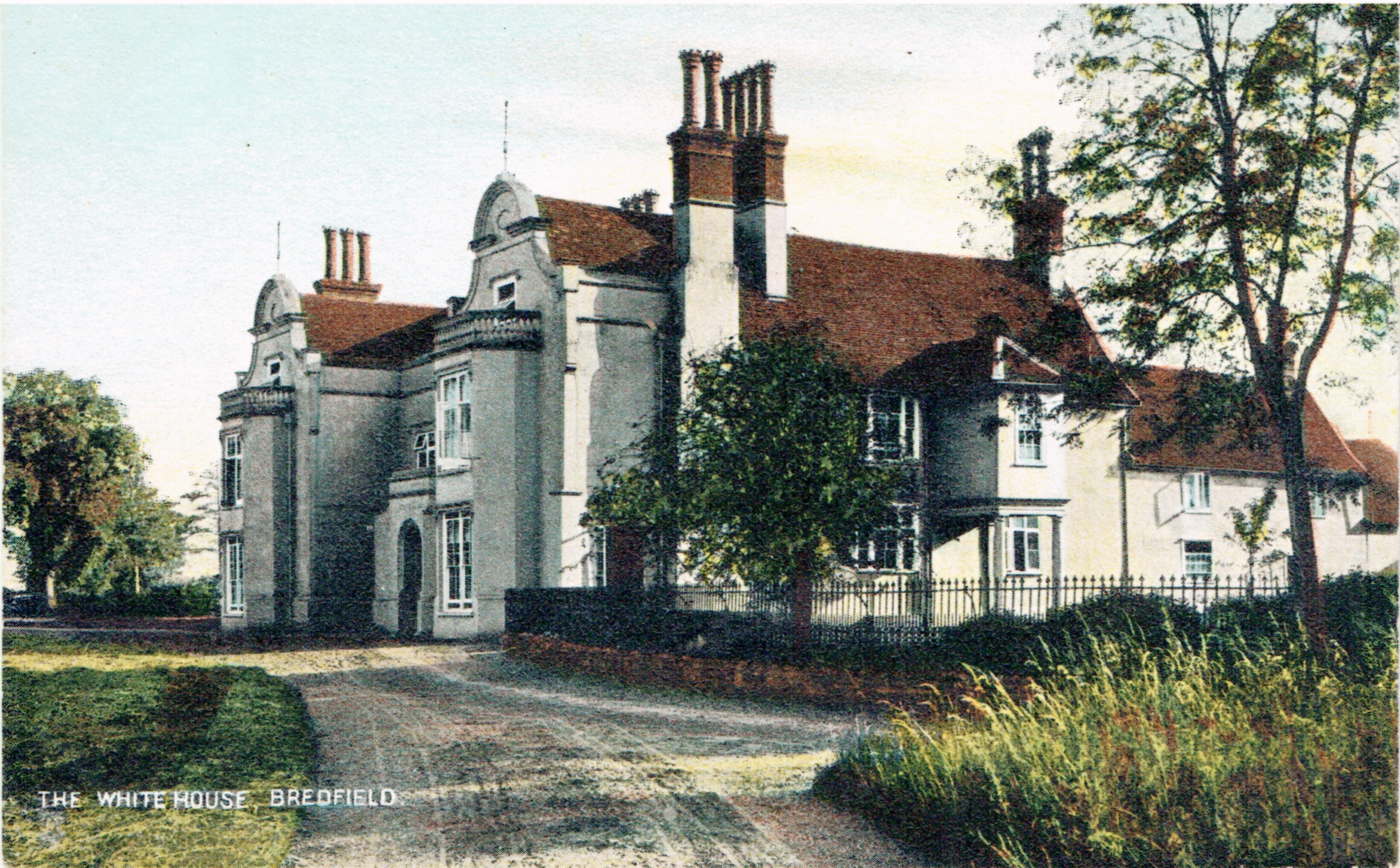
The White House, Bredfield postcard circa 1905

== History ==
In the seventeenth century Bredfield belonged to the Marryot family, who built the house. It passed to the Jenney family in 1683 by the marriage of Dorothy, daughter and co-heiress of Robert Marryott, to Edmund, the second son of Sir Robert Jenney. A later Edmund Jenney was High Sheriff of Suffolk for 1740.

The house is best known as the birthplace Edward FitzGerald (1809–1883), who translated the Rubàiyàt of Omar Khayyàm. Edward's father, John Fitzgerald, had rented it in 1801 from the Jenneys on his marriage to Edward's mother. Edward described it in his poem of 1839, Bredfield Hall which starts thus:

"Lo, an English mansion founded
In the elder James's reign,
Quaint and stately, and surrounded
With a pastoral domain."

Fitzgerald described the house as overlooking Hollesley Bay at the time when Horatio Nelson anchored there in 1801.

It was also described elsewhere as somewhat gaunt and charmless, but in a good park with gardens and ponds and fine stables and kennels.

Bredfield House was severely damaged by a V-1 flying bomb during World War II and has since been completely demolished. In 1984 the park was described as desolate and overgrown, with conifers indicating where the house once stood.
