= Bredfield =

Village in Suffolk, England

Coordinates: 52.128°N 1.314°E

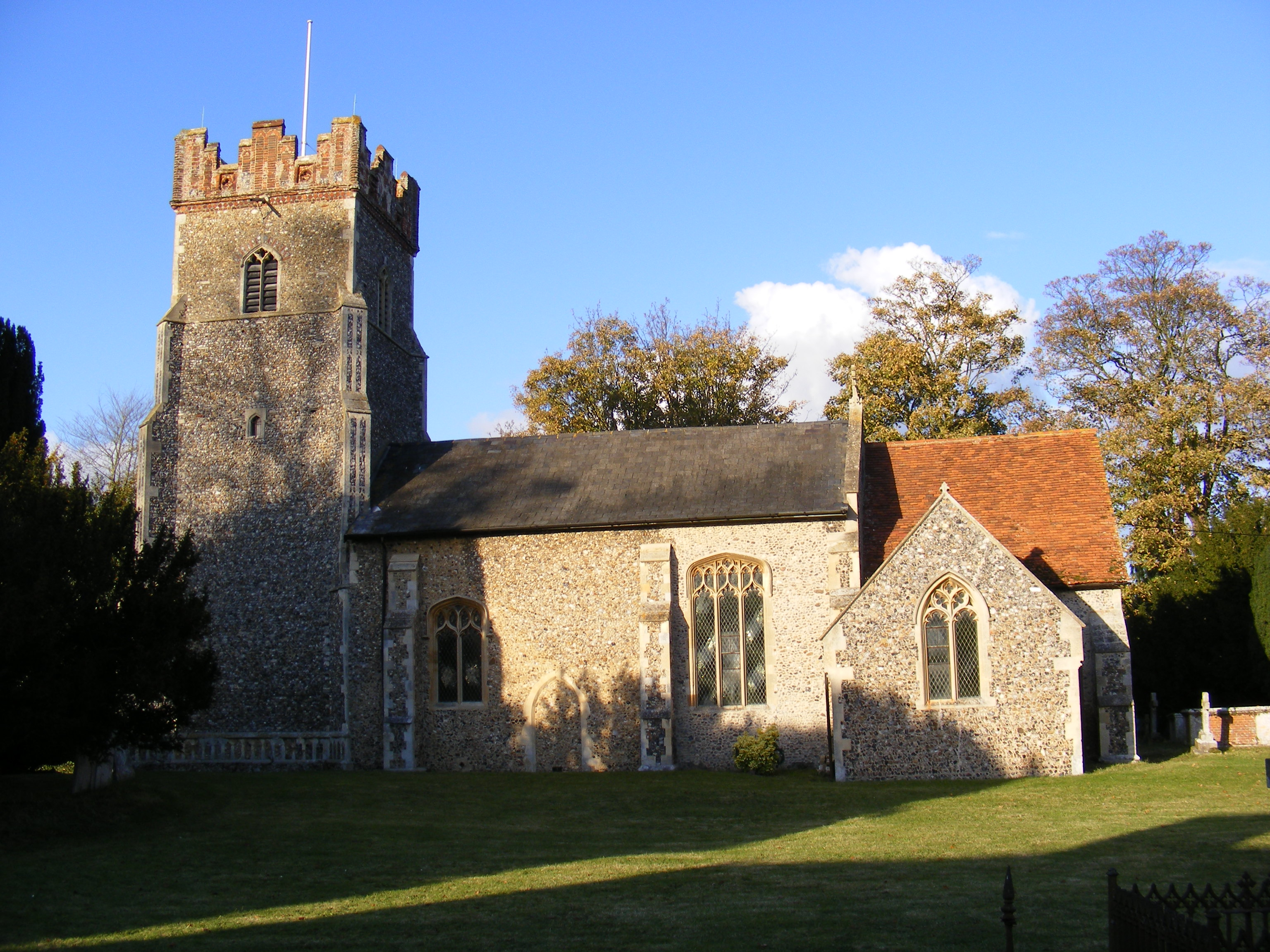
- St Andrew's Church, Bredfield

- Location within Suffolk
- Population: 340 (2011)
- Shire county: Suffolk
- Region: East
- Country: England
- Sovereign state: United Kingdom
- Post town: Woodbridge
- Postcode district: IP13

Bredfield is a small village and civil parish in the English county of Suffolk. It is situated off the A12, two miles north of Woodbridge. Another village, Dallinghoo, is to the north, and to the west is Boulge, a small hamlet. The population of Bredfield at the 2001 census was 308 (including 10 students living outside the village), the population increasing to 340 at the 2011 Census.

The first mention of Bredfield is in the Domesday Book of 1086, as Brēde Felda (or various permutations thereof) in Old English, meaning "broad clearing".

The historic building Bredfield House, the birthplace of poet and writer Edward FitzGerald, used to be situated in the village; however, it was damaged during World War II and has since been demolished. There is a historic non-denominational chapel (built in 1902) and a historic parish church (St Andrew's, dating from the 13th century). The Castle Inn public house has stood in the village since at least 1808, however it has not been open for several years. The village primary school, which also served surrounding villages, opened in 1853 and closed in 1986, and a number of its former pupils are still resident in the village.

The community has established the Jubilee Meadow conservation area and community orchard, development of which is ongoing.
