= Augustus Frederick Ellis =

British Army officer and politician

- Born: 17 September 1800
- Died: 16 August 1841 (aged 40)
- Education: Eton College
- Military career
- Allegiance: United Kingdom
- Branch: British Army
- Rank: Lieutenant-Colonel

Lieutenant-Colonel Hon. Augustus Frederick Ellis (17 September 1800 – 16 August 1841) was a British Army officer and Tory politician.

== Biography ==
Ellis was the son of Charles Ellis, 1st Baron Seaford and Elizabeth Catherine Caroline Hervey. His father's family made their wealth from sugar estates in the Colony of Jamaica, and they owned over 1,000 slaves.

He was educated at Eton College between 1811 and 1814, and commissioned into the 9th Regiment of Light Dragoons in 1817. On 4 October 1821 Ellis purchased a captaincy in the 76th Regiment of Foot.

He stood for the Seaford constituency, a seat controlled by his father, in the 1826 general election. He was returned as the Member of Parliament alongside fellow Tory John Fitzgerald. Ellis vacated the seat to allow George Canning to hold the seat in April 1827; when Canning died four months later, Ellis resumed the seat. He rarely attended the House of Commons and focused on his military career, being promoted to lieutenant-colonel in the 60th Royal Rifles in December 1828. Ellis voted for Catholic emancipation in March 1829.

He died in Jamaica in August 1841 while in the command of the 2nd Battalion of his regiment.

He married Mary Frances Thurlow Cunynghame, daughter of Col. Sir David Cunynghame of Milncraig, 5th Baronet and Maria Thurlow, on 25 June 1828. They had two sons, and three daughters:

- Major Charles David Cunynghame (25 July 1833 - 5 Dec 1906) married Emily Campbell, daughter of Maj.-Gen. Sir Guy Campbell, 1st Baronet. They had one son, and three daughters.
- Maj.-Gen. Sir Arthur Edward Augustus (13 Dec 1837 - 11 June 1907)
- Augusta Louisa Caroline (d. 21 May 1936) married Debonnaire John Monson, 8th Baron Monson on 25 December 1861. They had two sons, and three daughters.
- Annie Eliza Margaret (d. 21 Feb 1922) married Col. Sir Charles Edward Mansfield. They had no known issue.
- Mary Georgina Frances (d. 10 Jan 1917) married Gen. Hon. Sir Arthur Edward Hardinge. They had one son, Sir Arthur Henry Hardinge, and three daughters.
