= White baronets of Boulge Hall (1937) =

Escutcheon of the White baronets of Boulge Hall

The White baronetcy, of Boulge Hall in the County of Suffolk, was created in the Baronetage of the United Kingdom on 14 June 1937 for Robert Eaton White, Chairman of the Suffolk County Council. The baronetcy became extinct on the death in 2015 of the third Baronet, who did not claim the title.

== White baronets, of Boulge Hall (1937) ==
- Sir Robert Eaton White, 1st Baronet (1864–1940)
- Sir (Eric) Richard Meadows White, 2nd Baronet (1910–1972)
- Sir Christopher Robert Meadows White, 3rd Baronet (1940–2015)
