= Henry Hardinge, 1st Viscount Hardinge =

British Field Marshal and politician (1785–1856)

Field Marshal The Right Honourable The Viscount Hardinge GCB PC PC (Ire)
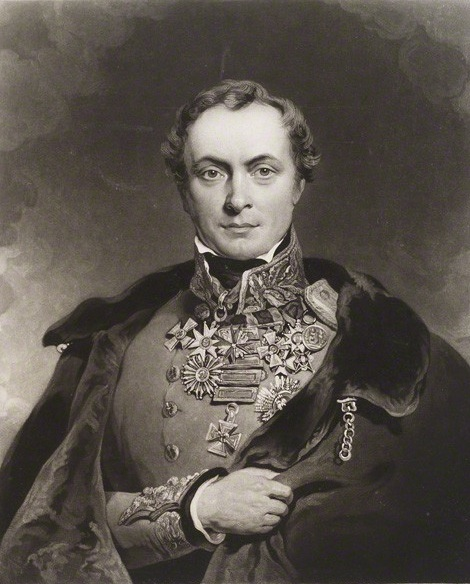

Governor-General of India
- In office 1844–1848
- Monarch: Queen Victoria
- Prime Minister: Sir Robert Peel; Lord John Russell
- Preceded by: William Wilberforce Bird; As Acting Governor-General
- Succeeded by: The Earl of Dalhousie

Chief Secretary for Ireland
- In office 30 July 1830 – 15 November 1830
- Prime Minister: The Duke of Wellington
- Preceded by: Lord Francis Leveson-Gower
- Succeeded by: Edward Smith Stanley

Member of Parliament
- In office 1820–1844

Personal details
- Born: 30 March 1785 Wrotham, Kent, England
- Died: 24 September 1856 (aged 71) Tunbridge Wells, Kent, England
- Spouse: Lady Emily Jane Stewart
- Children: 4, including Charles and Arthur

Military service
- Allegiance: United Kingdom
- Branch/service: British Army
- Years of service: 1799–1856
- Rank: Field Marshal
- Commands: Commander-in-Chief of the British Army
- Battles/wars: Peninsular War; Waterloo Campaign; First Anglo-Sikh War; Crimean War
- Awards: Knight Grand Cross of the Order of the Bath

Field Marshal Henry Hardinge, 1st Viscount Hardinge, GCB, PC, PC (Ire) (30 March 1785 – 24 September 1856) was a British Army officer and politician. After serving in the Peninsular War and the Waterloo Campaign he became Secretary at War in Wellington's ministry. After a tour as Chief Secretary for Ireland in 1830 he became Secretary at War again in Sir Robert Peel's cabinet. He went on to be Governor-General of India at the time of the First Anglo-Sikh War and then Commander-in-Chief of the Forces during the Crimean War.

== Early life ==
The son of the Rev, Henry Hardinge, Rector of Stanhope, and his wife Frances Best, he was educated at Durham School and Sevenoaks School. Hardinge entered the British Army on 23 July 1799 as an ensign in the Queen's Rangers, a corps then stationed in Upper Canada. He was promoted to lieutenant by purchase in the 4th Regiment of Foot on 27 March 1802 and transferred to the 1st Regiment of Foot on 11 July 1803 before becoming a captain of a company by purchase in the 57th Regiment of Foot on 21 April 1804. In February 1806 he was sent to the newly formed Staff College at High Wycombe.

== Military career ==
=== Peninsular War ===
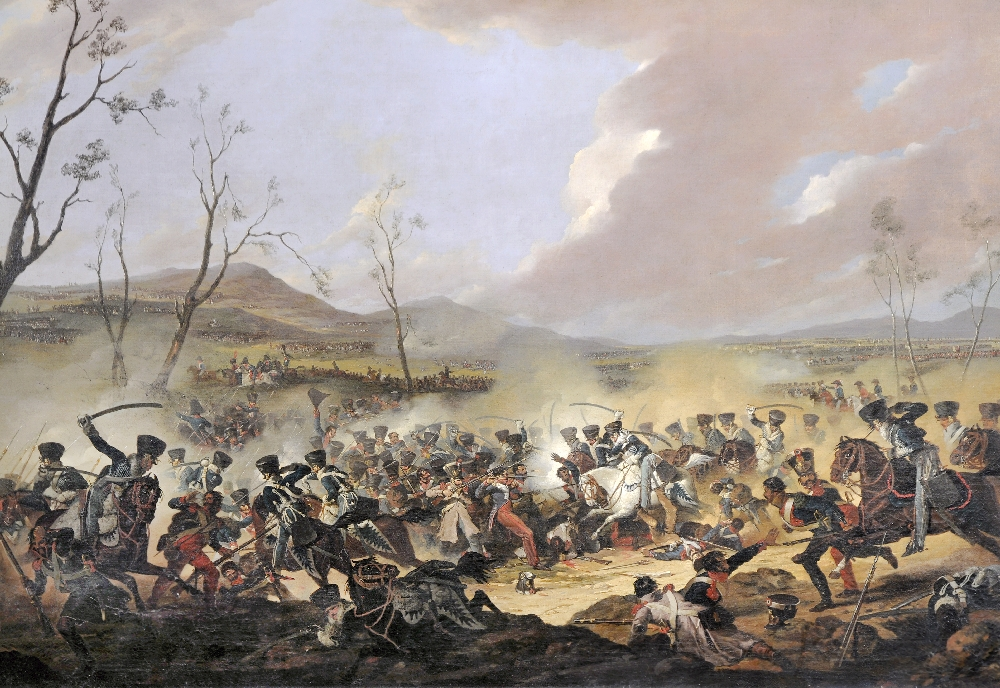
The Battle of Orthez, at which Hardinge commanded the Portuguese brigade, during the Peninsular War

He saw action at the Battle of Roliça on 17 August 1808, at the Battle of Vimeiro on 21 August 1808, where he was wounded, and at Corunna on 16 January 1809 where he was by the side of Sir John Moore when the latter was killed. He was promoted to major on 13 April 1809 and appointed deputy-quartermaster-general in the Portuguese army and was present at many of the battles of the Peninsular War. Promoted to lieutenant-colonel in 1811, he saved the day for the British at Battle of Albuera on 16 May 1811 by taking responsibility at a critical moment and strongly urging General Cole's division to advance. He took part in the Battle of Vitoria on 21 June 1813, where he was wounded again, and was also present at the Battle of the Pyrenees in July 1813 and the Battle of Nivelle on 10 November 1813. He commanded the Portuguese brigade at the Battle of Orthez on 27 February 1814 and the Battle of Toulouse on 10 April 1814. He was appointed Knight Commander of the Order of the Bath in January 1815.

=== Hundred Days campaign ===
When war broke out again in 1815 after Napoleon's escape from Elba, Hardinge returned to active service as a brigadier. Attached to the staff of the allied Prussian Army under Marshal Blucher, he was present at the Battle of Ligny on 16 June 1815, where he lost his left hand by a shot, and thus was not present at Waterloo two days later. Wellington presented him with a sword that had belonged to Napoleon. Hardinge remained attached to the Prussian army of occupation in France until 1818.

He was promoted to brevet colonel on 19 July 1821 and to major-general on 22 July 1830.

== Political service ==
=== Member of Parliament ===
Statue of Hardinge in Calcutta, circa 1860.

At the 1820 general election, Hardinge was returned to parliament as member for Durham. On 4 April 1823 he was appointed Clerk of the Ordnance a post he held until May 1827, and then again from January to May 1828. On 9 June 1828 he accepted the office of Secretary at War in Wellington's ministry, and was appointed a privy councillor. On 21 March 1829 he acted as the Duke of Wellington's second for the Wellington–Winchilsea duel at Battersea Fields. At the 1830 general election he transferred to the pocket borough of St Germans.

In July 1830 he exchanged portfolios with Lord Francis Leveson-Gower, becoming Chief Secretary for Ireland, but relinquished the post in November following the collapse of the Wellington–Peel ministry. He resigned his seat at St Germans in December and was elected for Newport, another Tory pocket borough, a week later. He held Newport at the 1831 general election and in 1832, after Newport was disenfranchised, stood in Launceston and was re-elected. He would remain in this seat until he stood down in May 1844.

=== Chief Secretary for Ireland ===
He was appointed Chief Secretary for Ireland from December 1834 to April 1835, and then was Secretary at War once again in Sir Robert Peel's cabinet from 1841 to 1844. He was promoted to lieutenant-general in 1841. At this time he had a London home at Whitehall Gardens, Westminster.

=== Governor-General of India ===
In May 1844 he succeeded Lord Ellenborough as Governor-General of India. He was advanced to Knight Grand Cross of the Order of the Bath on 1 July 1844. Following the death of Maharajah Ranjit Singh a succession war broke out and the first Sikh War ensued in 1845. Hardinge, waiving his right to the supreme command, offered to serve as second in command under Sir Hugh Gough. At the Battle of Mudki on 18 December 1845 Gough commanded the right flank and Hardinge commanded the left flank. After further British successes at the Battle of Sobraon on 10 February 1846, the Battle of Ferozeshah on 21 December 1845 and the Battle of Aliwal on 28 January 1846, Hardinge concluded the campaign with the Treaty of Lahore with Maharajah Duleep Singh on 9 March 1846 and the Treaty of Amritsar with Maharajah Gulab Singh on 16 March 1846. He was created Viscount Hardinge of Lahore and of King's Newton in Derbyshire on 7 April 1846. Due to their policy of not harming prisoners of war during the First Anglo-Sikh War, many Sikhs had taken to liking the British administration, which is why only a select few chieftains rebelled during the Second Anglo-Sikh War. Hardinge was, and still is, known as Tunda Laat (Tunda means crippled due to him losing his left hand at the Battle of Ligny, and Laat is a corruption of Lord), though he is viewed positively.

Viscount Hardinge's Annuity Act 1846
- Act of Parliament
- Parliament of the United Kingdom
- Long title: An Act to enable the Right Honourable Henry Viscount Hardinge to receive the full Benefit of an Annuity of Five thousand Pounds granted to him by the East India Company.
- Citation: 9 & 10 Vict. c. 21
- Territorial extent: United Kingdom

Dates
- Royal assent: 18 June 1846
- Commencement: 18 June 1846 (Note: The Acts of Parliament (Commencement) Act 1793.)
- Repealed: 11 August 1875
Other legislation
Repealed by	Statute Law Revision Act 1875

Status: Repealed

Text of statute as originally enacted

Annuity Lord Hardinge Act 1846
- Act of Parliament
- Parliament of the United Kingdom
- Long title: An act to settle an Annuity on Viscount Hardinge, and the Two next surviving Heirs Male of the Body of the said Viscount Hardinge to whom the Title of Viscount shall descend, in consideration of his great and brilliant Services.
- Citation: 9 & 10 Vict. c. 31
- Territorial extent: United Kingdom

Dates
- Royal assent: 27 July 1846
- Commencement: 27 July 1846
- Repealed: 18 December 1953
Other legislation
Repealed by	Statute Law Revision Act 1953

Status: Repealed

Text of statute as originally enacted

Recognising an annuity of £5,000 being paid by the East India Company, Parliament provided that Viscount Hardinge should continue to receive his full salary as Governor General. Under a subsequent Act, in recognition of his "great and brilliant services", Parliament settled an annuity of £3,000 on Lord Hardinge and the next two heirs male of his body, although this was not to be paid if the East India Company paid an annuity.

== Commander-in-Chief ==
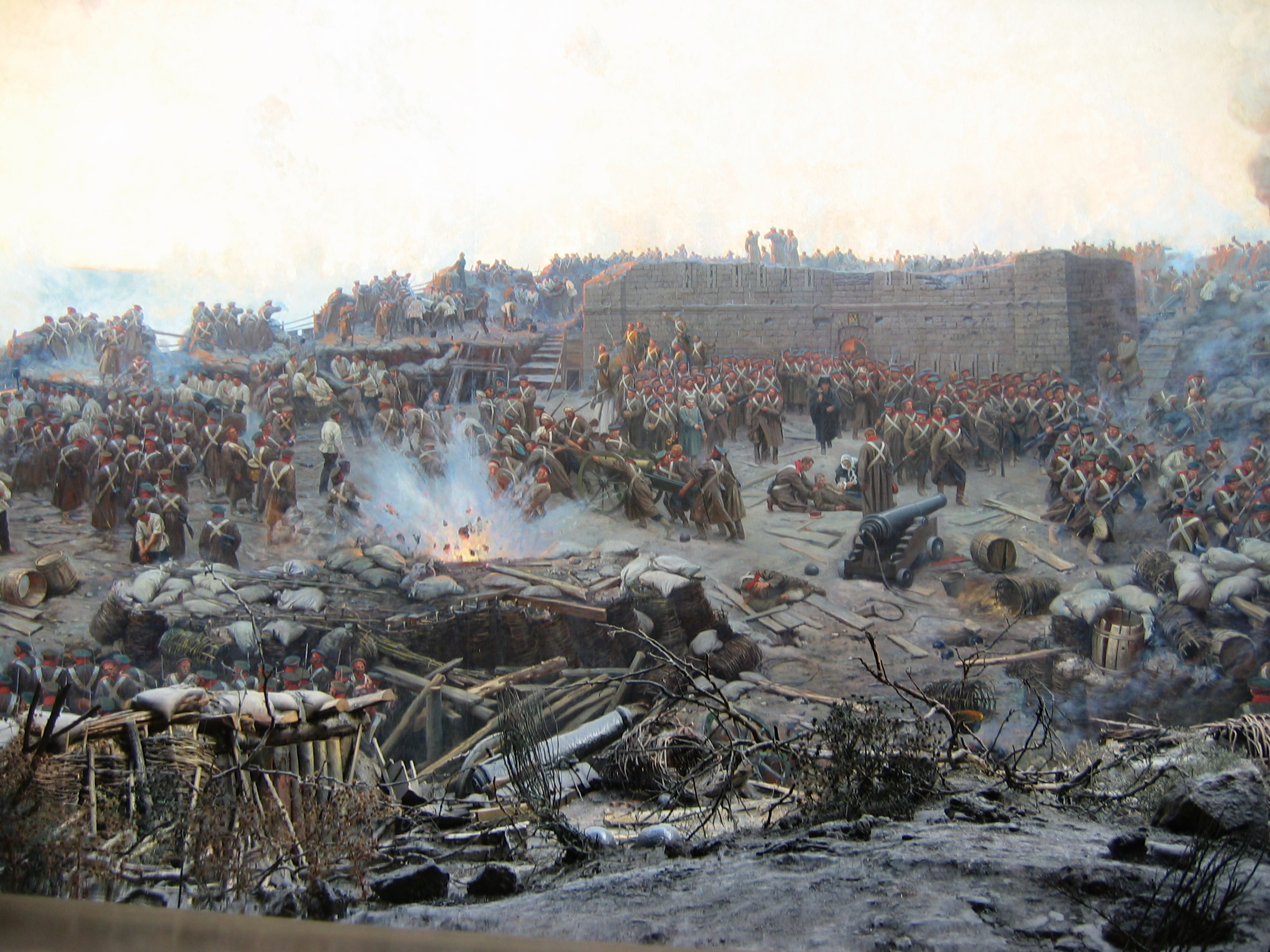
The Crimean War, the conduct of which Hardinge directed as Commander-in-Chief of the Forces

Hardinge returned to England in 1848, and became Master-General of the Ordnance on 5 March 1852; he succeeded the Duke of Wellington as commander-in-chief of the British Army on 28 September 1852. While in this position he had responsibility for the direction of the Crimean War, which he endeavoured to conduct on Wellington's principles — a system not altogether suited to the changed mode of warfare. He was promoted to brevet general on 20 June 1854 and field marshal on 2 October 1855. A commission was set up to investigate the failings of the British military during the Crimean campaign. As Hardinge was delivering the report of the commission to Queen Victoria and Prince Albert, he collapsed with a stroke. Albert helped him to a sofa, where despite being paralysed on one side, he continued to deliver his report, apologizing for the interruption.

He was also colonel of the 97th Regiment of Foot from 4 March 1833 and of the 57th Regiment of Foot from 31 May 1843.

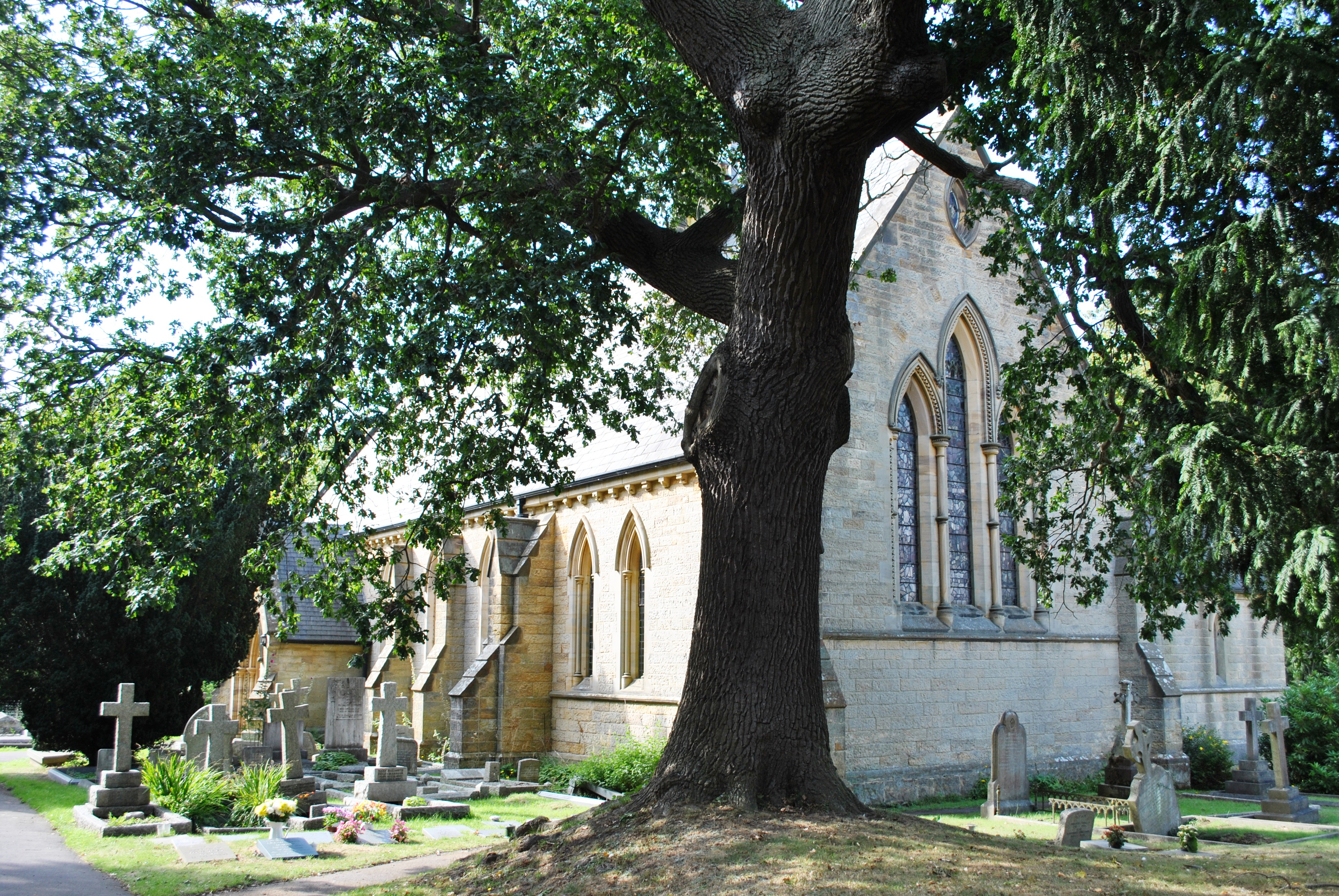
St Peter, Fordcombe

Hardinge resigned his office of commander-in-chief in July 1856, owing to failing health, and died on 24 September 1856 at South Park near Tunbridge Wells. There is a memorial to him at St John the Baptist, Penshurst. He is buried in the churchyard at St. Peter, Fordcombe.

== Family ==
In 1821 he married Lady Emily Jane, seventh daughter of Robert Stewart, 1st Marquess of Londonderry. They had two sons, and two daughters:

- Charles Stewart Hardinge, 2nd Viscount Hardinge of Lahore and Kings Newton (2 Sep 1822 – 28 July 1894)
- Arthur Edward Hardinge (2 Mar 1828 – 15 July 1892) married Mary Georgina Frances Ellis, daughter of Lt.-Col. Hon. Augustus Frederick Ellis. They had two sons, and three daughters, one of whom being Arthur Henry Hardinge.
- Hon. Frances Elizabeth Hardinge (d. 9 July 1894) married Gen. Sir Arthur Cunynghame, son of Sir David Cunynghame, 5th Baronet. They had two sons, and three daughters.
- Hon. Emily Caroline Hardinge (d. 4 Sep 1876). Unmarried, a lady-in-waiting to Princess Alice of the United Kingdom.

His elder son, Charles Stewart, who had been his private secretary in India, was the 2nd Viscount Hardinge. The younger son of the 2nd Viscount, Charles Hardinge (b. 1858), became a prominent diplomat, and was appointed Viceroy of India in 1910, being created Baron Hardinge of Penshurst.

His stepson was Walter James, 1st Baron Northbourne, (1816–1893).

== Bibliography ==
- Hardinge, Charles (1891). Viscount Hardinge. Forgotten Books. ASIN B008VNGNS6.
- Heathcote, Tony (1999). The British Field Marshals 1736–1997. Pen & Sword Books Ltd. ISBN 0-85052-696-5.
- Muir, Rory (2015). Wellington: Waterloo and the Fortunes of Peace 1814–1852. Yale University Press.
- Rait, Robert (1903). Life and Campaigns of Viscount Gough. Forgotten Books. ASIN B008ROL9TC.

Parliament of the United Kingdom
Preceded by Richard Wharton; Michael Angelo Taylor	Member of Parliament for Durham; 1820–1830; With: Michael Angelo Taylor	Succeeded by Michael Angelo Taylor; Sir Roger Gresley
Preceded by Charles Ross; James Loch	Member of Parliament for St Germans; 1830; With: Charles Ross	Succeeded by Charles Ross; Winthrop Mackworth Praed
Preceded by Jonathan Raine; John Doherty	Member of Parliament for Newport (Cornwall); 1830–1832; With: Jonathan Raine 1831; Viscount Grimston 1831–1832	Constituency abolished
Preceded by James Brogden; Sir John Malcolm	Member of Parliament for Launceston; 1832–1844	Succeeded by William Bowles
Political offices
Preceded by Robert Ward	Clerk of the Ordnance; 1823–1827	Succeeded by Sir George Clerk, Bt
Preceded by The Viscount Palmerston	Secretary at War; 1828–1830	Succeeded by Sir Francis Leveson Gower
Preceded by Lord Francis Leveson-Gower	Chief Secretary for Ireland; 1830	Succeeded by Edward Smith-Stanley
Preceded by Edward Littleton	Chief Secretary for Ireland; 1834–1835	Succeeded by Viscount Morpeth
Preceded by Thomas Macaulay	Secretary at War; 1841–1844	Succeeded by Sir Thomas Fremantle
Preceded by The Marquess of Anglesey	Master-General of the Ordnance; 1852	Succeeded by The Lord Raglan
Government offices
Preceded by William Wilberforce Bird, acting	Governor-General of India; 1844–1848	Succeeded by The Earl of Dalhousie
Military offices
Preceded by The Duke of Wellington	Commander-in-Chief of the Forces; 1852–1856	Succeeded by The Duke of Cambridge
Preceded by Sir Frederick Adam	Colonel of the 57th (West Middlesex) Regiment of Foot; 1843–1856	Succeeded by Sir James Love
Preceded by Sir Robert O'Callaghan	Colonel of the 97th (The Earl of Ulster's) Regiment of Foot; 1833–1843	Succeeded by Sir Charles Napier
Peerage of the United Kingdom
New creation	Viscount Hardinge; 1846–1856	Succeeded by Charles Hardinge
