= W. F. Prideaux =

British scholar on the ancient kingdom of Sheba

William Francis Prideaux (30 April 1840-1914) was a British scholar on the ancient kingdom of Sheba.

== Early life and education ==
William Prideaux was born on 30 April 1840 in London, the eldest son of F. W. Prideaux, Revenue Secretary of the India Office in London. He attended Aldenham School.

== Early career ==
Prideaux began a career with the India Office in 1859, but left to join the Bombay Army as an Ensign. In 1864, he served with Hormuzd Rassam in the Abyssinian Mission to Emperor Theodore II of Ethiopia, but was imprisoned for almost two-years from July 1866.
