= Arthur Hardinge (British Army officer) =

British Army general (1828–1892)

General The Honourable Sir Arthur Hardinge KCB CIE
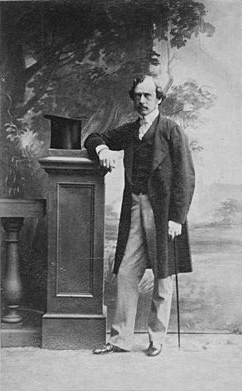
- Born: 2 March 1828
- Died: 15 July 1892 (aged 64); Weymouth, Dorset
- Burial place: Fordcombe, Kent
- Military career
- Allegiance: United Kingdom
- Branch: British Army
- Service years: 1844–1892
- Rank: General
- Commands: Bombay Army
- Conflicts: Crimean War
- Awards: Knight Commander of the Order of the Bath; Companion of the Order of the Indian Empire

General Sir Arthur Edward Hardinge KCB CIE (2 March 1828 – 15 July 1892) was Governor of Gibraltar.

== Military career ==
Born the second son of Henry Hardinge, 1st Viscount Hardinge and educated at Eton College, Hardinge was commissioned into the 41st Regiment of Foot in 1844. He was quickly appointed Aide-de-Camp to his father, then serving as Governor-General of India. In 1849 he transferred to the Coldstream Guards. He went to the Crimea as Deputy Assistant Quartermaster-General in 1854 and was present at the Battle of Alma, Battle of Balaclava, Battle of Inkerman and Siege of Sevastopol. He became Assistant Quartermaster-General at Shorncliffe in 1856 and became Equerry to Prince Albert in 1858 and, following Albert's death, he became Equerry to Queen Victoria.

In 1881 he was appointed Commander of the Bombay Army and colonel of the Royal Inniskilling Fusiliers until 1886, when he was transferred to be Governor of Gibraltar and colonel of the 1st Battalion of the King's Royal Rifle Corps. He was promoted full general on 1 April 1883. On his return to England in 1890, he transferred to be colonel of the 1st Battalion, Coldstream Guards until his death. He was made Knight Commander of the Order of the Bath in 1886.

He died on 15 July 1892 from injuries received in a carriage accident at Weymouth and was buried in the churchyard of St. Peter, Fordcombe, Kent.

== Family ==
On 30 December 1858, he married Mary Georgina Frances Ellis, daughter of Lieutenant-Colonel the Honourable Augustus Frederick Ellis, and had one son (Arthur Henry Hardinge) and three daughters.

Military offices
Preceded by Sir Henry Warre	C-in-C, Bombay Army; 1881–1886	Succeeded by Sir Charles Arbuthnot
Preceded by Sir Thomas Steele	Colonel of the Coldstream Guards; 1890–1892	Succeeded by Sir Frederick Stephenson
Preceded by Edward Arthur Somerset	Colonel of the 1st Battalion, The King's Royal Rifle Corps; 1886–1890	Succeeded by Robert Beaufort Hawley
Preceded by Sir Edward Harris Greathed	Colonel of the 2nd Battalion, Royal Inniskilling Fusiliers; 1881–1886	Succeeded by Sir James Talbot Airey
Government offices
Preceded by Sir John Adye	Governor of Gibraltar; 1886–1890	Succeeded by Sir Leicester Smyth
