= Arthur Henry Dallimore =

New Zealand Pentecostal minister and British-Israelite

Arthur Henry Dallimore (14 September 1873 – 23 July 1970) was a New Zealand Pentecostal minister and British-Israelite. He was born in Penshurst, Kent, England on 14 September 1873.
