= Robert Bernard Martin =

American scholar and biographer (1918–1999)

Robert Bernard Martin (1918–1999) was an American scholar and biographer, specializing in Victorian literature. Under the pseudonym Robert Bernard he also published a novel.

== Life ==
Robert Bernard Martin was born on September 11, 1918, in La Harpe, Illinois, to Carl and Maggie Martin. He graduated from high school in Davenport and received his A.B. summa cum laude from the University of Iowa in 1943. During World War II he served in the U.S. Army Air Forces in Italy and France. He was a professor of English at Princeton University from 1951 to 1975, when he retired to Oxford.

Martin published several books about the Victorian era, including biographies of Alfred Tennyson, Gerard Manley Hopkins and Edward Fitzgerald. His life of Tennyson won the James Tait Black Award and the Duff Cooper Prize.

In addition to his scholarly publications, Martin wrote a mystery novel titled Deadly Meeting, published under the pseudonym Robert Bernard. Set at the fictional Wilton University in New England, the novel depicts conflicts within the university's English department that culminate in the murder of a faculty member. Among its central characters is Dame Millicent Hetherege, a retired Oxford professor specializing in medieval literature who temporarily replaces the deceased professor and plays a significant role in solving the mystery.

== Works ==
- Charlotte Brontë's Novels: The Accents of Persuasion (1948)
- The Dust of Combat: A Life of Charles Kingsley (1959)
- Enter Rumour: Four Early Victorian Scandals (1962)
- Victorian Poetry; Ten Major Poets: Tennyson, Browning, Arnold, Meredith, D. G. Rossetti, Christina Rossetti, Swinburne, Hardy, Hopkins, Housman (1964)
- Deadly Meeting (1970) by Robert Bernard
- The Triumph of Wit: A Study of Victorian Comic Theory (1974)
- Tennyson: The Unquiet Heart (1980)
- With Friends Possessed: A Life of Edward FitzGerald (1985)
- Gerard Manley Hopkins: A Very Private Life (1991)
