= Arthur Henry Hardinge =

British diplomat

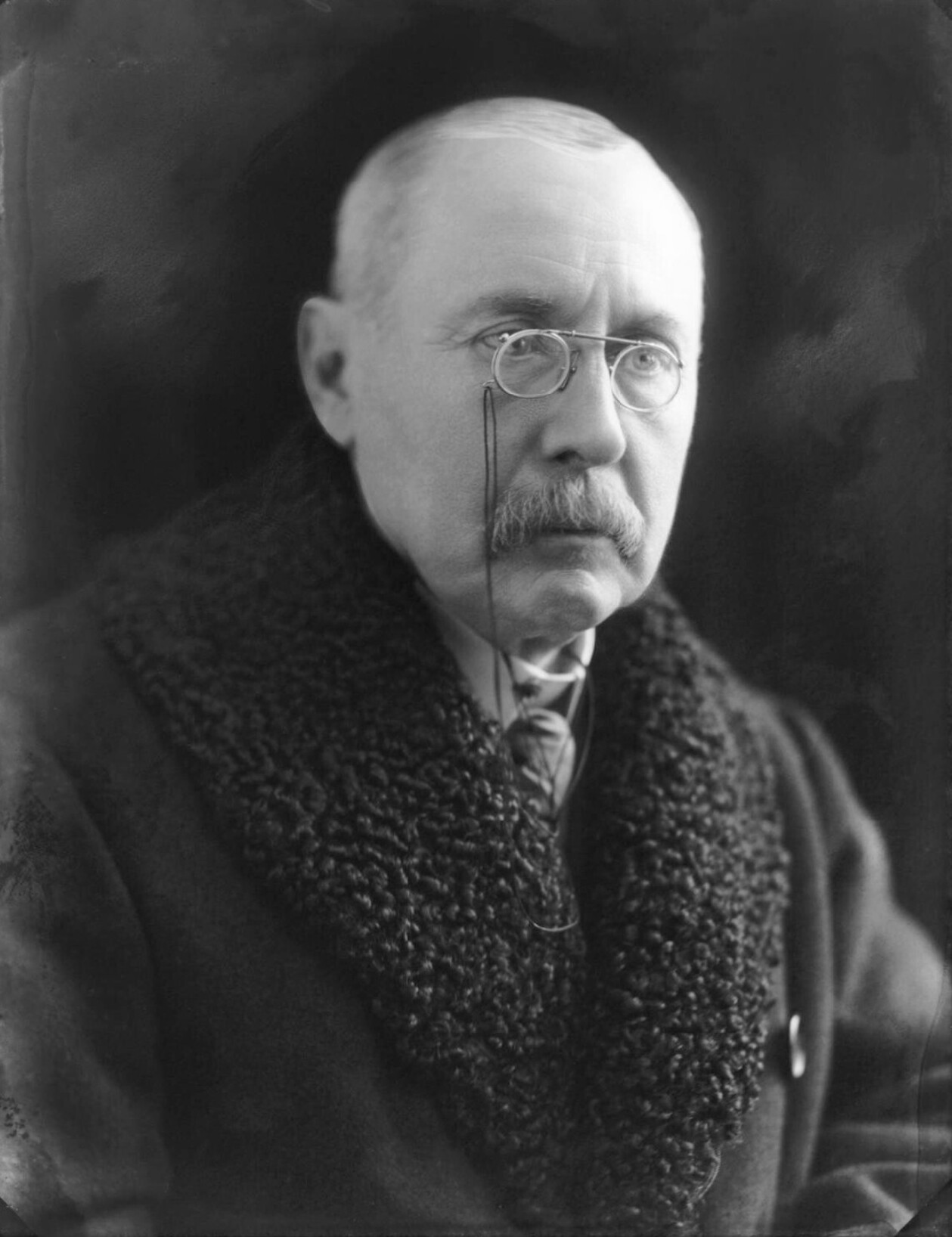
Arthur Henry Hardinge

Sir Arthur Henry Hardinge, GCMG, KCB (12 October 1859 – 27 December 1933), was a senior British diplomat.

== Early life ==
Hardinge was born in London, the son of General Hon. Sir Arthur Edward Hardinge, (1828–1892), KCB, Commander of the Bombay Army and later Governor of Gibraltar, and a grandson of the 1st Viscount Hardinge. He was a Page of Honour to Queen Victoria 1870–1876.

Hardinge studied Classics and Modern History at Balliol College, Oxford, matriculating in 1877 and graduating B.A. in 1881. He won the Lothian Prize Essay in 1880, and became a Fellow of All Souls College in 1881. He was a fluent speaker of Spanish and French.

== Diplomatic career ==
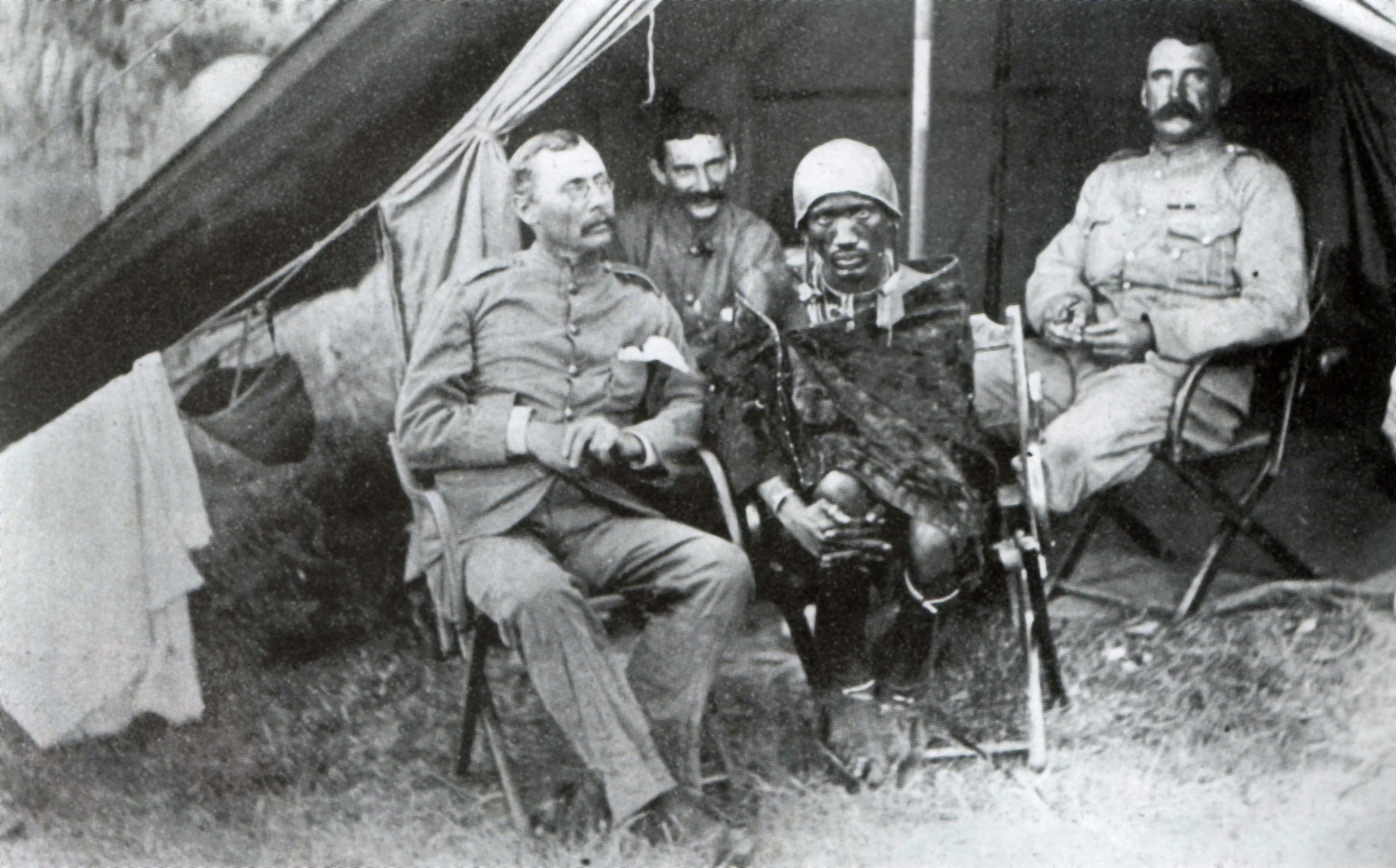
A photo of Lenana, the Chief Medicine-Man of the Maasai circa 1890. Point Lenana (4,985m), the third highest peak, on Mount Kenya was named after him by Halford Mackinder. Lenana is shown with Sir Arthur Hardinge, wearing spectacles, on his left.

Hardinge entered the Foreign Office in 1880, and had his first posting as a Junior Agent of the British Foreign Office, at Madrid, Spain, in 1883, under Ambassador Robert Morier. He acted as a Secretary to the Foreign Minister Lord Salisbury in 1885, and when Robert Morier was appointed Ambassador to Saint Petersburg, Russia, he went there as his personal aide.

In 1887, he went to Istanbul, Turkey, under Sir William White, moving in 1890 to Bucharest, Romania. He accompanied the Russian Tsarevich on his trip to India 1890–91, and was then acting Consul-General in Cairo, Egypt, in 1891, under Sir Evelyn Baring.

In 1894 he was appointed Consul General to Zanzibar being promoted to Colonial Head, 1895–1900, at the British East Africa Protectorate, overseeing there the construction of the Uganda Railway and the crushing of an Arabic ethnic rebellion. In October 1900 he was appointed Consul-General in Persia, a post which was later upgraded to Minister. Staying in Teheran until 1906, he stressed the importance of stopping Tsarist Russia on courting the political favours of the Persian government .

Concern by King Edward VII prompted him to accept the position as Minister to Belgium 1906–1911, and later as Minister to Portugal 1911–1913, and Ambassador to Spain, 1913–1919, a neutral country in World War I. He was frequently visited at Madrid and Barcelona by the notorious literary widow and sister to the famous General José Millán Astray, who was running some sort of World War I espionage network in both places and took thus opportunities to read and transcribe faithfully his diplomatic notes.

He retired in 1920, aged 61. He became the author of several books, including The Life of Henry Howard Molyneux Herbert, 4th Earl of Carnarvon (2 vols., 1925) and two volumes of autobiography, A Diplomatist in Europe (1927) and A Diplomatist in the East (1928). A supporter of right-wing politics, he joined the British Fascists.

He died in Mortlake and was buried in the churchyard of St. Peter, Fordcombe, Kent.

== Family ==
Hardinge married, in 1899, Alexandra Mina Ellis, daughter of Major-General Sir Arthur Ellis. They had a daughter, and three sons. The sons were Henry Arthur Mina Hardinge (1904–1925), Edward William George Hardinge (1905–1906) (godson of Edward VII) and George Granville Douglas Hardinge (1912–1927).

== Honours ==
The Most Honourable Order of the Bath

- Companion (CB) 1895
- Knight Commander (KCB) 1904

The Most Distinguished Order of St Michael and St George

- Knight Commander (KCMG) 1897
- Knight Grand Cross (GCMG) 1910
