= Boulge =

Hamlet in Suffolk, England

Coordinates: 52.126°N 1.294°E

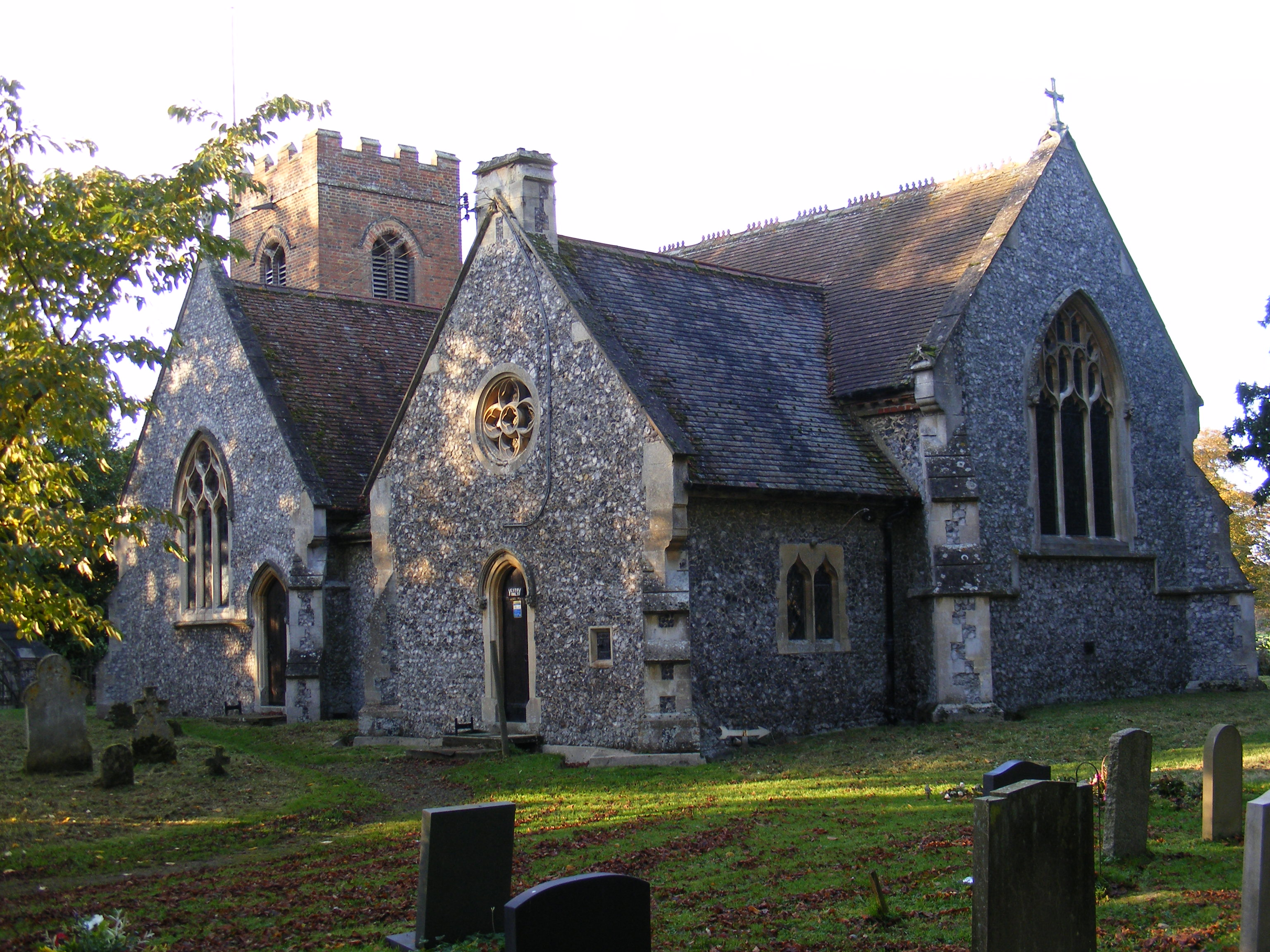
- Church of St Michael and All Angels, Boulge

- Location within Suffolk
- Interactive map of Boulge
- Population: 26 (2001 census)
- Shire county: Suffolk
- Region: East
- Country: England
- Sovereign state: United Kingdom
- Post town: Woodbridge
- Postcode district: IP13

Boulge is a hamlet and civil parish in the East Suffolk district of Suffolk, England. It is about 3 miles (5 km) north of Woodbridge. The population remained minimal at the 2011 Census and was included in the civil parish of Debach.

The place-name is French and probably means 'bag-shaped piece of land', rather than the 'rough overgrown land' previously assumed.

Boulge parish church is the burial place of the local poet and writer Edward Fitzgerald, whose most famous work was his translation of The Rubaiyat of Omar Khayyam. The Church of St Michael and All Angels is Grade II listed as are, separately, the Fitzgerald family mausoleum and Edward Fitzgerald's grave. The Victorian restorations of 1853, 1857, 1867 and 1895 "almost entirely rebuilt" the church. There is a Tournai font of 1150.

== Boulge Hall ==
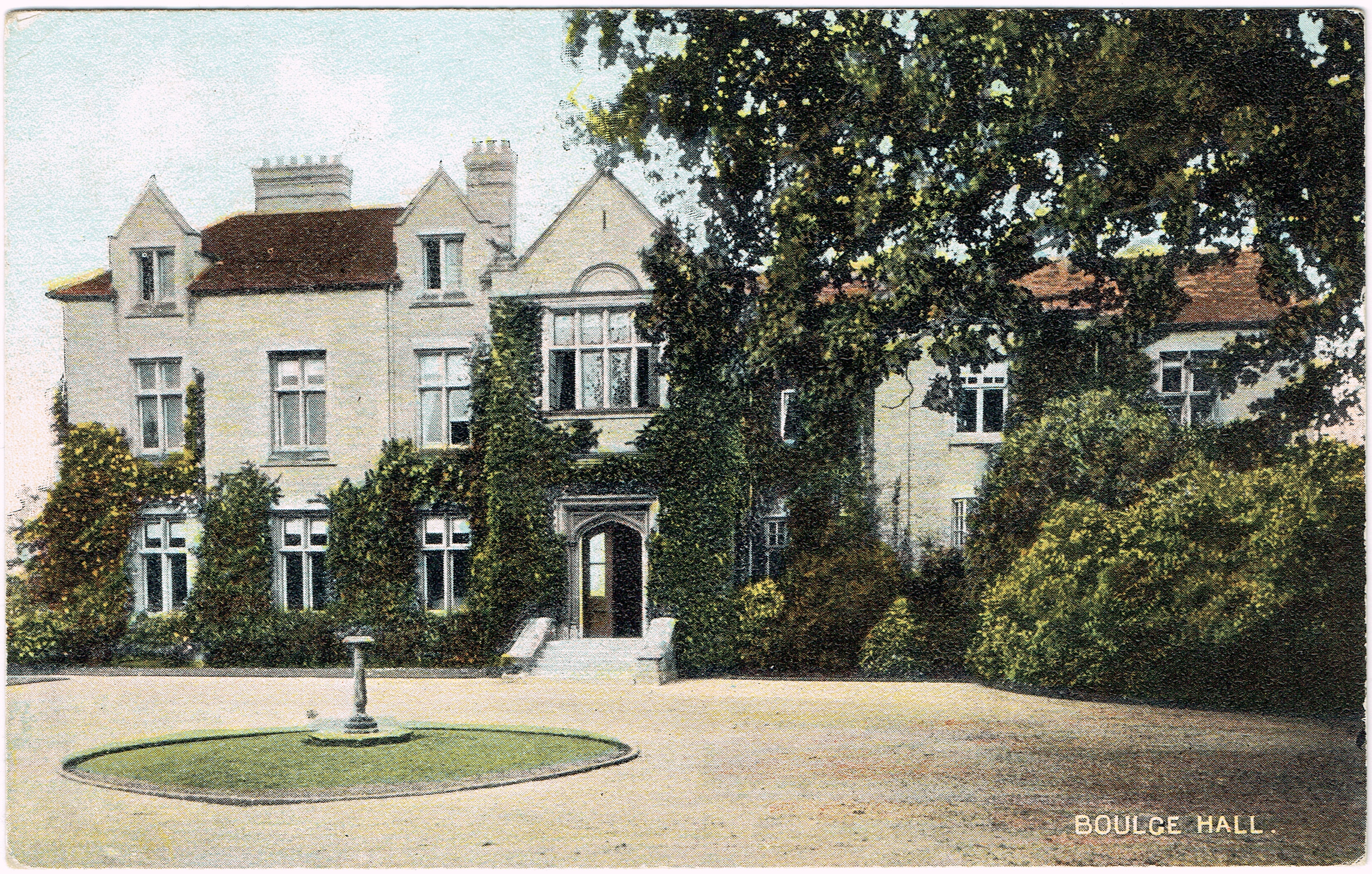
Boulge Hall c.1905; it was demolished in 1955.

Boulge Cottage in the surrounding park was built c.1800 for Mrs Eleanor Short. Known as the "Queen of Hell" on account of her furious temper, Mrs Short had inherited Boulge Hall in 1792 on the death of her second husband, William Whitby. She later married Henry Short (formerly Hassard) an ex-lieutenant-colonel in the Royal Dragoons.

John Fitzgerald bought Boulge Hall in 1801 for his daughter Mary and her new husband, John Purcell (later John Fitzgerald), Edward's parents. The purchase was on the understanding that the hall would remain in the possession of the previous owner until death, but Mrs Short did not die until 1831, when she was 84. The couple lived instead at nearby Bredfield House and eventually moved into Boulge Hall in 1835. Edward occupied a cottage in the grounds until the estate was inherited by his elder brother John Purcell-Fitzgerald in 1852.

The hall was later purchased by Sir Robert Eaton White, 1st Baronet (1864–1940), Chairman of the Suffolk County Council, whose descendants held it until c.1950.

It was demolished in 1955, owing to its general dereliction.
